= 1816 United States presidential election in New Hampshire =

- November 4, 1816
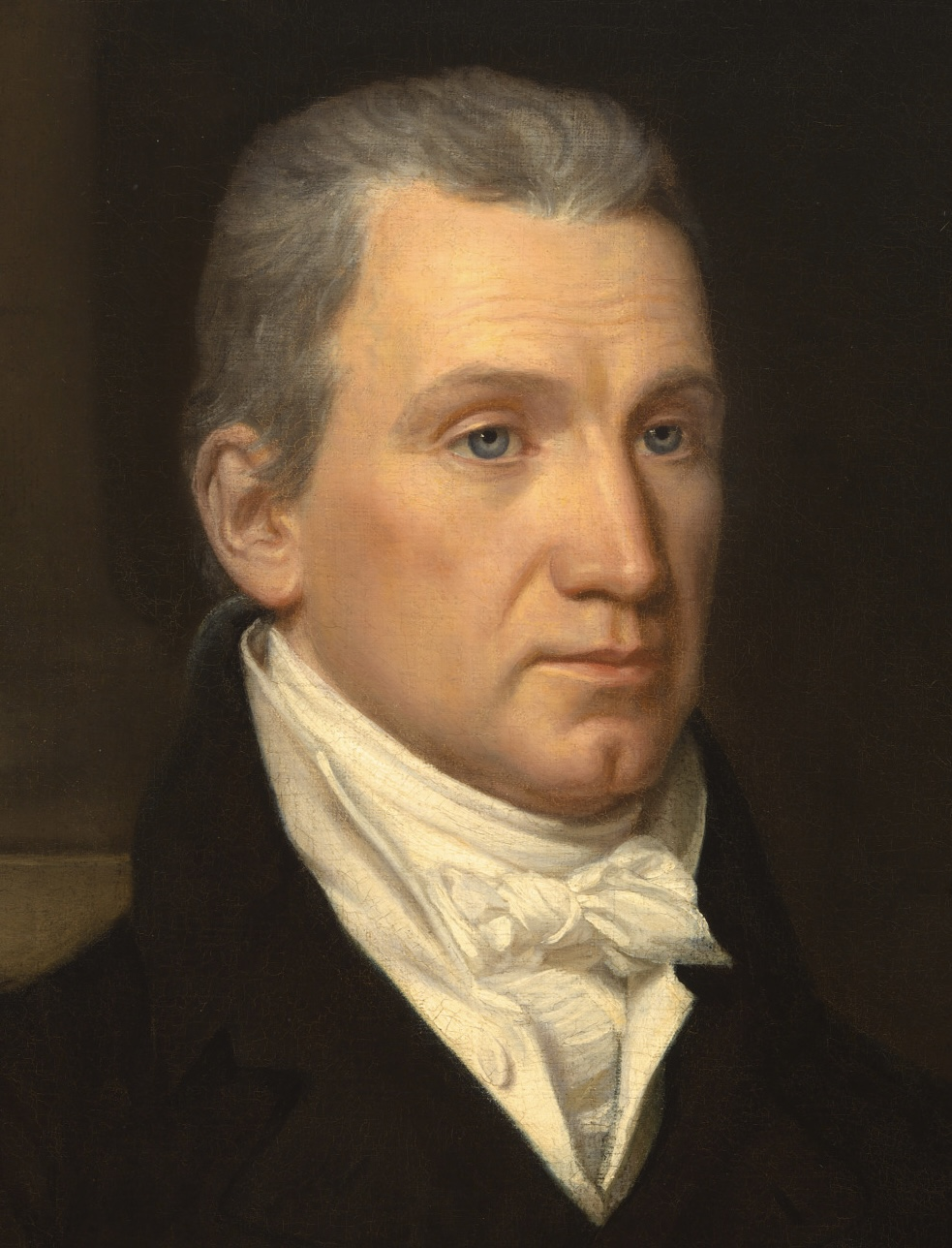

Nominee	James Monroe	Unpledged electors
Party	Democratic-Republican	Federalist
Home state	Virginia	N/A
Running mate	Daniel D. Tompkins	N/A (Note: No candidate formally nominated)
Electoral vote	8	0
Popular vote	15,225	13,338
Percentage	53.3%	46.7%
County results
Monroe
50–60%
60–70%
Federalist electors
50–60%
President before election
James Madison
Democratic-Republican
Elected President
James Monroe
Democratic-Republican

A presidential election was held in New Hampshire on November 4, 1816, as part of the 1816 United States presidential election. The Democratic-Republican ticket of U.S. Secretary of State James Monroe and Governor of New York Daniel D. Tompkins defeated the Federalist ticket. Whereas nationally the Federalist Party failed to nominate a candidate, and most state parties effectively conceded the election, in New Hampshire a serious effort was mounted to defeat the Democratic-Republican ticket. Victory in New Hampshire presaged the national Democratic-Republican landslide; with 183 electoral votes, Monroe easily defeated the senior U.S. senator from New York Rufus King, who received 34 votes from unpledged electors despite not being a candidate.

== General election ==
=== Summary ===
New Hampshire chose eight electors on a statewide general ticket. Nineteenth-century election laws required voters to vote directly for members of the Electoral College rather than for president. This sometimes resulted in small differences in the number of votes cast for electors pledged to the same presidential candidate, if some voters did not vote for all the electors nominated by a party. This table compares the votes for the most popular elector pledged to each ticket, to give an approximate sense of the statewide result.

1816 United States presidential election in New Hampshire
Party	Candidate	Votes	%
Democratic-Republican	James Monroe Daniel D. Tompkins	15,225	53.30
Federalist	Unpledged electors	13,338	47.70
Total votes		28,563	100.00

=== Results ===
1816 United States presidential election in New Hampshire
Party	Candidate	Votes
Democratic-Republican	William Badger	15,225
Democratic-Republican	Amos Cogswell	15,225
Democratic-Republican	Richard H. Ayer	15,218
Democratic-Republican	Jacob Tuttle	15,213
Democratic-Republican	Thomas C. Drew	15,207
Democratic-Republican	Thomas Manning	15,199
Democratic-Republican	Benjamin Butler	15,140
Democratic-Republican	Dan Young	15,133
Federalist	Samuel Hale	13,338
Federalist	Nathaniel A. Haven	13,321
Federalist	George B. Upham	13,316
Federalist	Thomas Bellows	13,315
Federalist	John T. Gilman	13,313
Federalist	Robert Means	13,311
Federalist	William Webster	13,297
Federalist	Benjamin J. Gilbert	13,119
None	John Durken	74
None	William Plumer	28
None	John Langdon	21
None	William Hale	16
None	Samuel Wates Hale	14
None	Arthur Livermore	14
None	John F. Parrott	13
Federalist	Jeremiah Smith	13
None	Josiah Butler	12
Federalist	Bradbury Cilley	12
None	Clifton Clagett	12
None	Parker Noyes	12
None	Nathaniel Upham	12
Federalist	Roger Vose	12
None	Jeduthun Wilcox	12
None	Salma Hale	11
Federalist	Oliver Peabody	4
None	Thomas Cogswell	2
None	Caleb Keith	2
Federalist	James Sheafe	2
None	Samuel Sparhawk	2
None	Joseph Tuttle	2
None	Uriah Wilcox	2
None	Josiah Bartlett Jr.	1
None	Levi Bartlett	1
None	John Bellows	1
None	Jacob Billey	1
None	John J. Cutts	1
None	Richard Dame	1
None	Samuel B. Dana	1
None	Richard C. Drew	1
Federalist	Timothy Farrar	1
None	Samuel Gilchrist	1
None	Nathaniel Gilman	1
None	John Harris	1
None	Daniel Hawkins	1
None	Joseph Healy	1
None	Samuel Hotkinson	1
None	Samuel Holmes	1
None	Elisha Huntley	1
None	Jonas C. Marsh	1
None	Thomas Means	1
None	Richard Odell	1
None	Mills Olcott	1
None	Nahum Parker	1
None	Moses P. Payson	1
None	Benjamin Pierce	1
None	Samuel Quarles	1
None	Nathan Taylor	1
None	Timothy Walker	1
None	Benjamin West	1
Total		≥28,563

=== Results by county ===
This table compares the result for the most popular Democratic-Republican and Federalist electors in each county. The totals presented thus differ slightly from the statewide results summary, which compares the results for the most popular elector pledged to each ticket statewide.

County	James Monroe Democratic-Republican		Unpledged electors Federalist		Margin		Total
County	Votes	Percent	Votes	Percent	Votes	Percent	Total
Cheshire	2,724	43.51	3,536	56.48	-812	-12.97	6,260
Coös	254	62.56	152	37.44	102	25.12	406
Grafton	1,541	43.68	1,987	56.32	-446	-12.64	3,528
Hillsborough	4,382	64.32	2,431	35.68	1,951	28.64	6,813
Rockingham	3,585	53.19	3,155	46.81	430	6.38	6,740
Strafford	2,740	56.79	2,085	43.21	655	13.58	4,825
TOTAL	15,226	53.29	13,346	46.71	1,862	6.58	28,572

=== Electoral college ===
1816 United States Electoral College vote in New Hampshire
For president				For vice president			
Candidate	Party	Home state	Electoral vote	Candidate	Party	Home state	Electoral vote
James Monroe	Democratic-Republican	Virginia	8	Daniel D. Tompkins	Democratic-Republican	New York	8
Total			8	Total			8

== See also ==
- United States presidential elections in New Hampshire
