= 1816 United States presidential election =

Election of James Monroe

- November 1 – December 3, 1816

217 members of the Electoral College 109 electoral votes needed to win
- Turnout: 16.9% (▼23.5 pp)
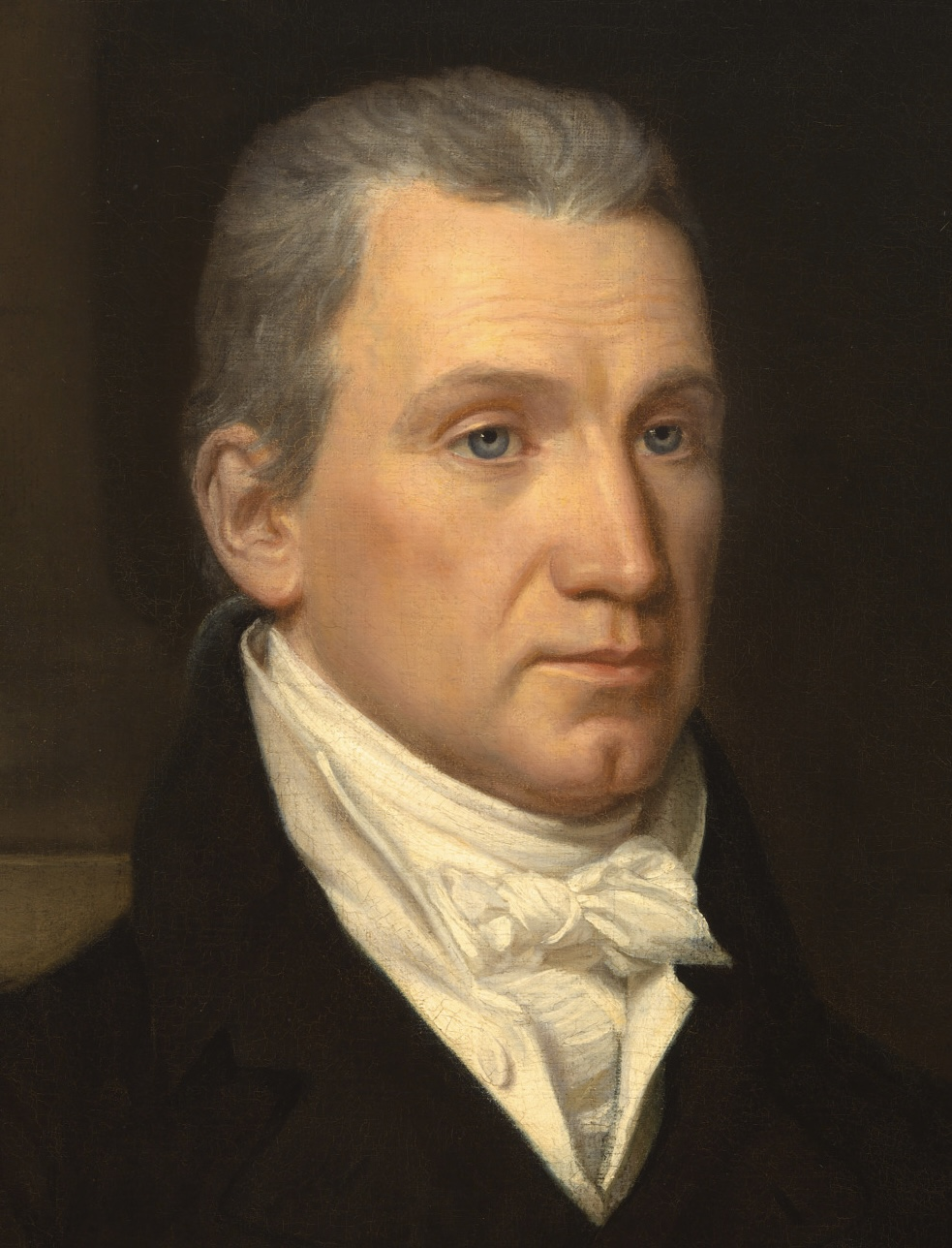

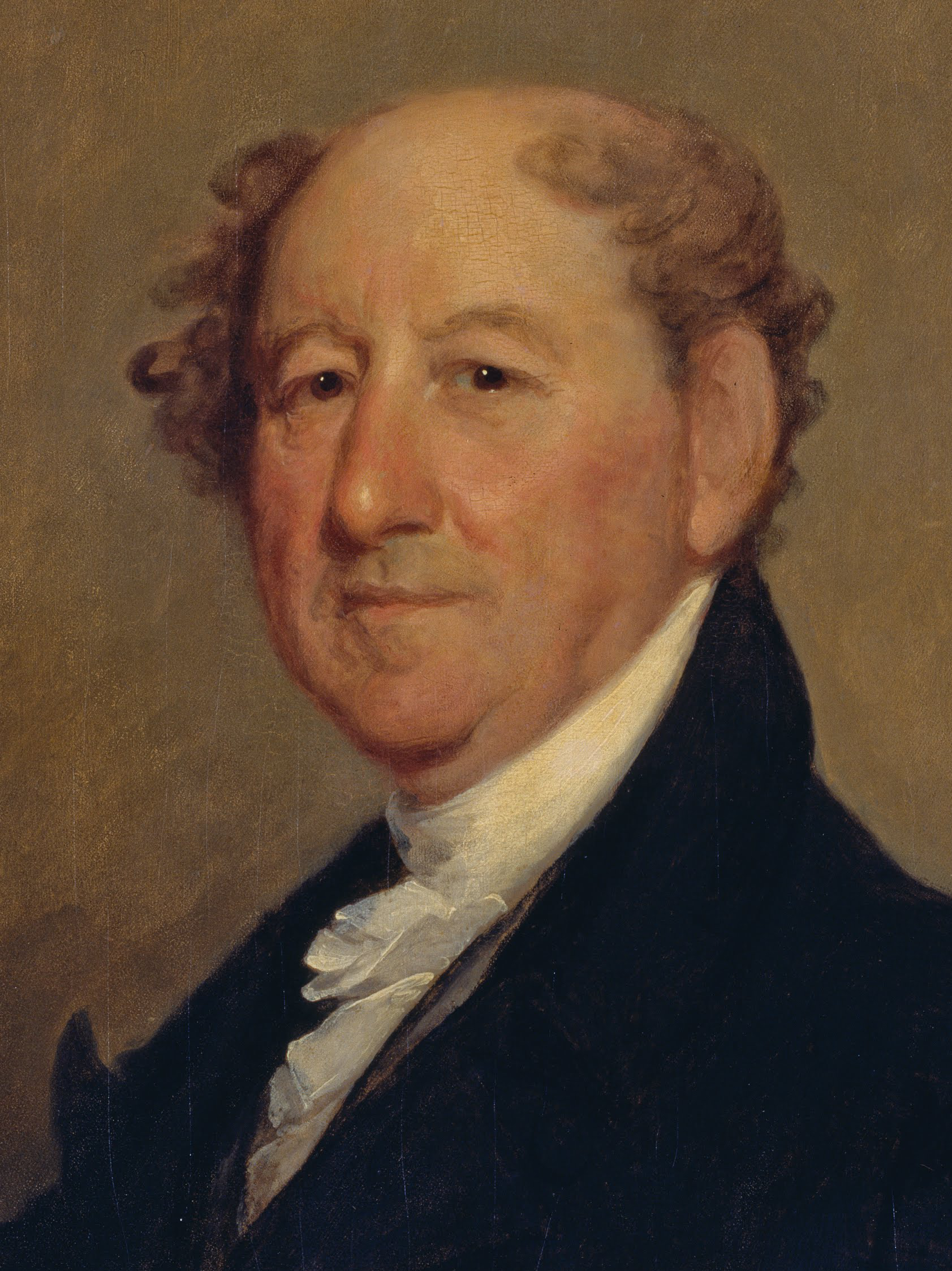
Nominee	James Monroe	Rufus King
Party	Democratic-Republican	Federalist
Home state	Virginia	New York
Running mate	Daniel D. Tompkins	N/A (Note: No candidate was formally nominated. John Eager Howard received 22 votes for vice president, James Ross received 5, John Marshall received 4, and Robert Goodloe Harper received 3.)
Electoral vote	183 (Note: Including 3 electoral votes from Indiana. The United States Congress recognized Indiana statehood on December 11, 1816, after the election but before the electoral votes were counted. During the joint session of the United States Congress, the electoral count was read with Indiana's votes included.)	34
States carried	16	3
Popular vote	76,762	17,300 (Note: Votes cast for Federalist unpledged electors)
Percentage	68.7%	15.5%
- Presidential election results map. Green denotes states won by Monroe/Tompkins and Salmon denotes states won by King. One elector from Delaware and three from Maryland did not vote. Numbers indicate the number of electoral votes cast by each state.
President before election
James Madison
Democratic-Republican
Elected President
James Monroe
Democratic-Republican

A presidential election was held in the United States from November 1 to December 4, 1816. The Democratic-Republican ticket of secretary of state James Monroe and the governor of New York Daniel D. Tompkins defeated the de facto Federalist candidate, the senior U.S. senator from New York Rufus King. Although not formally nominated, King became the last Federalist presidential candidate upon receiving 34 votes from Federalist unpledged electors. In the next election, the Federalists carried three states but did not field their own candidate, instead supporting the incumbent Monroe, before disappearing by the end of the 1820s.

The outgoing president James Madison did not seek re-election to a third consecutive term. Monroe emerged as the Democratic-Republican frontrunner and secured the party's nomination at its congressional nominating caucus in March, narrowly defeating the secretary of war William H. Crawford. The caucus nominated Tompkins for vice president over the governor of Pennsylvania Simon Snyder. The Federalists were disorganized following the end of the War of 1812 and did not hold a caucus or formally select a candidate. King himself remained aloof from the campaign and did nothing to promote his candidacy. No consensus on a vice presidential candidate emerged among the Federalist electors, who scattered their votes between four candidates.

Monroe benefited from the popularity of the outgoing Madison administration and resurgent nationalism following the end of the war. Madison's 1816 message to Congress endorsed an ambitious economic program that robbed the Federalists of much of their platform, most notably chartering the Second Bank of the United States. In spite of significant discontent with the caucus system and the incumbent Virginia dynasty, the Democratic-Republicans were able to avoid a major factional schism in contrast to the previous election. The Federalists meanwhile were demoralized, dogged by accusations of treason, and ill-prepared to mount a national campaign. Most took Monroe's election for granted and did not attempt to prevent it. In three states where electors were chosen by the legislature, Federalists controlled the selection process and appointed unpledged electors who voted for King. Monroe carried the 16 remaining states, including every state where electors were chosen by popular vote, amidst widespread voter apathy and anemic turnout.

== Nominations ==
=== Democratic-Republican Party ===
==== Caucus ====
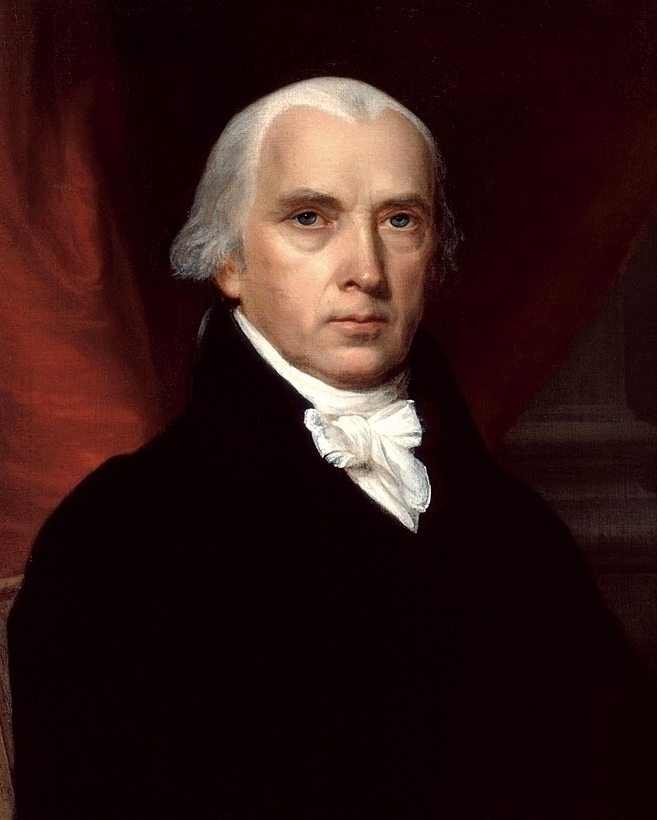
James Madison, the incumbent president in 1816, whose second term expired on March 4, 1817

Monroe followed an uncertain path to the nomination in 1816. He had feuded with Madison for most of the preceding three decades, running against him for a seat in the United States House of Representatives in 1789 and for the presidency in 1808. Monroe mended relations with Madison during the War of 1812, serving as secretary of state and secretary of war in the latter's administration, and by 1816 was positioning himself as the president's natural successor. Monroe was not personally popular, and his candidacy encountered resistance from northern Democratic-Republicans and others opposed to the extension of the Virginia dynasty. During the winter of 1815–16, New York governor Daniel D. Tompkins and Monroe's successor as secretary of war William H. Crawford emerged as rivals for the presidency.

Popular in his home state, Tompkins could count on the loyal support of the Anti-Clintonian faction of the New York Democratic-Republican Party, but his candidacy struggled to attract a national following. While the New York General Assembly formally nominated him for president on February 14, his lack of name recognition, youth, and volatility were seen as serious disadvantages. By March, Tompkins had seemingly given up all hope of his nomination and instead focused his efforts on the vice presidency.

Although Crawford publicly denied interest in the presidency, his candidacy quickly gathered significant support from editors and politicians ahead of the party's congressional nominating caucus, and by February had amassed enough strength to present a serious challenge to Monroe. Despite this, Crawford remained hesitant to openly seek the nomination. Having personally assured the secretary of state that he would not be a candidate in 1816, he was reluctant to damage his standing in the party with a fight for the nomination. The continued enthusiasm for his candidacy following his public refusal in February left the war secretary unsure of how to proceed.

Substantial public opinion opposed the caucus system as corrupt, undemocratic, and potentially unconstitutional. While Monroe preferred to retain the caucus system, Crawford's popularity among Democratic-Republicans in Congress made calling a caucus immediately disadvantageous to Monroe's chances of gaining the nomination. When finally an anonymous notice announced the date of the caucus as March 12, the meeting was attended by only 58 members, principally supporters of Crawford. The gathering was judged too small to command public credibility, and on the motion of Jeremiah Morrow of Ohio, the caucus adjourned until March 16. During the recess, Crawford instructed the U.S. senators from Georgia Charles Tait and William W. Bibb to withdraw his candidacy, having decided to postpone his ambitions until 1824. When the caucus met again on the 16th, all but 22 Democratic-Republican members were in attendance. Henry Clay and John W. Taylor again moved that it was "inexpedient" to nominate a presidential candidate, but were voted down; the caucus then nominated Monroe by a vote of 65 to 54.

Monroe owed his majority over Crawford to the 11 Virginians in attendance, who supplied the margin of victory. Crawford received the votes of the New York, New Jersey, Georgia, and Kentucky delegations, notwithstanding their candidate's withdrawal. Of the 22 Democratic-Republican members who did not attend the caucus, the majority were Crawfordites who absented themselves at Crawford's request to allow Monroe's nomination. The narrow margin between the candidates and the presumed sympathies of the 22 absent members encouraged the belief that "Crawford would certainly have been nominated had he made even the slighted effort on his behalf."

In the event of his defeat, Crawford had instructed Tait and Bibb to issue a statement that he had been drafted without his consent; this the senators neglected to do. Crawford would subsequently attribute Monroe's lack of support for his candidacy in 1824 to this embarrassment.

Presidential nomination
Candidate	1st
James Monroe	65
William H. Crawford	54

==== Nominees ====
Democratic-Republican Party 1816 Democratic-Republican Party Ticket
James Monroe	Daniel D. Tompkins
for President	for Vice President
7th U.S. Secretary of State (1811–17)	4th Governor of New York (1807–17)

==== Other candidates ====
Candidates in this section are sorted by vote count in the caucus
William H. Crawford	Daniel D. Tompkins
U.S. secretary of War (1815–16)	4th governor of New York (1807–17)
LN: March 16, 1816; 54 votes	W: March 13, 1816; 0 votes

==== Vice presidential nomination ====
Maneuvering for the vice presidency began in the weeks preceding the caucus, when the identity of the presidential candidate was still an open question. Sensing his presidential chances lagging, Tompkins advertised his willingness to accept the vice presidency under either Monroe or Crawford. Several others were considered available candidates, including the governor of Pennsylvania Simon Snyder and the speaker of the U.S. House of Representatives Henry Clay of Kentucky. Snyder's hopes were dashed when he failed to secure the formal endorsement of the Pennsylvania congressional delegation. It was widely assumed that Crawford and Tompkins each sought to recruit the other for the second place on the ticket. The New York delegation floated a Tompkins–Crawford ticket that could unite all foes of the Virginia dynasty; when this failed, they approached Clay, to no avail. Tompkins emerged as the overwhelming favorite when the caucus met on March 16 and was nominated by a large majority, while Snyder finished a distant second. Passed over for the presidency, the New Yorker substantially exceeded Monroe's margin over Crawford, winning the votes of nearly three quarters of the members in attendance.

Vice Presidential nomination
Candidate	1st
Daniel D. Tompkins	85
Simon Snyder	30

=== Federalist Party ===
==== Failure to nominate a ticket ====
The Federalist Party entered the election in disarray. Following peace with Britain in 1815, "the strength that the Federalists had shown in the middle states during the war years melted away." Disconnected state parties lacked a unifying national organization capable of fielding candidates or mounting a national campaign. Where Federalists were more than a negligible presence, charges of disloyalty hounded the party in the wake of the Hartford Convention. This enfeebled party apparatus proved incapable of even selecting a candidate to oppose Monroe: although different names were mentioned in hearsay reports and private correspondence, no caucus was ever held, no consensus among state parties or the Federalist press emerged, and as late as December it remained unclear for whom (if anyone) the Federalist electors from Connecticut, Delaware, Maryland, and Massachusetts would vote.

If the Federalists were to choose a candidate, King appeared by far the likeliest possibility. A respected senator and former delegate to the Constitutional Convention who had twice been the party's vice presidential candidate in 1804 and 1808, by 1816 King was the only individual capable of uniting the party's remaining supporters. In February, the New York Evening Post predicted that King and former speaker of the U.S. House of Representatives Langdon Cheves would be the nominees of the Federalist caucus for president and vice president. However, in the interim, the New York Federalist Party nominated King for governor in the April 1816 election after the party's original candidate, William W. Van Ness, withdrew. King lost the election to Tompkins, and although the Democratic-Republican majority was not overwhelming, the defeat ended any hope of King's nomination for president. While some Federalists suggested the former U.S. senator from Maryland John Eager Howard or even Crawford as possible candidates, no serious movement to nominate either man ever materialized. The Federalists thus entered the fall campaign without a ticket, and with most party leaders resigned to an inevitable Democratic-Republican victory.

==== Candidates ====
Candidates in this section are sorted by number of electoral votes for president and then alphabetically by last name
Rufus King	William H. Crawford	John E. Howard
U.S. senator from New York (1813–25)	U.S. secretary of War (1815–17)	U.S. senator from Maryland (1796–1803)
NN	W: March 16, 1816	DNR

== Campaign issues ==
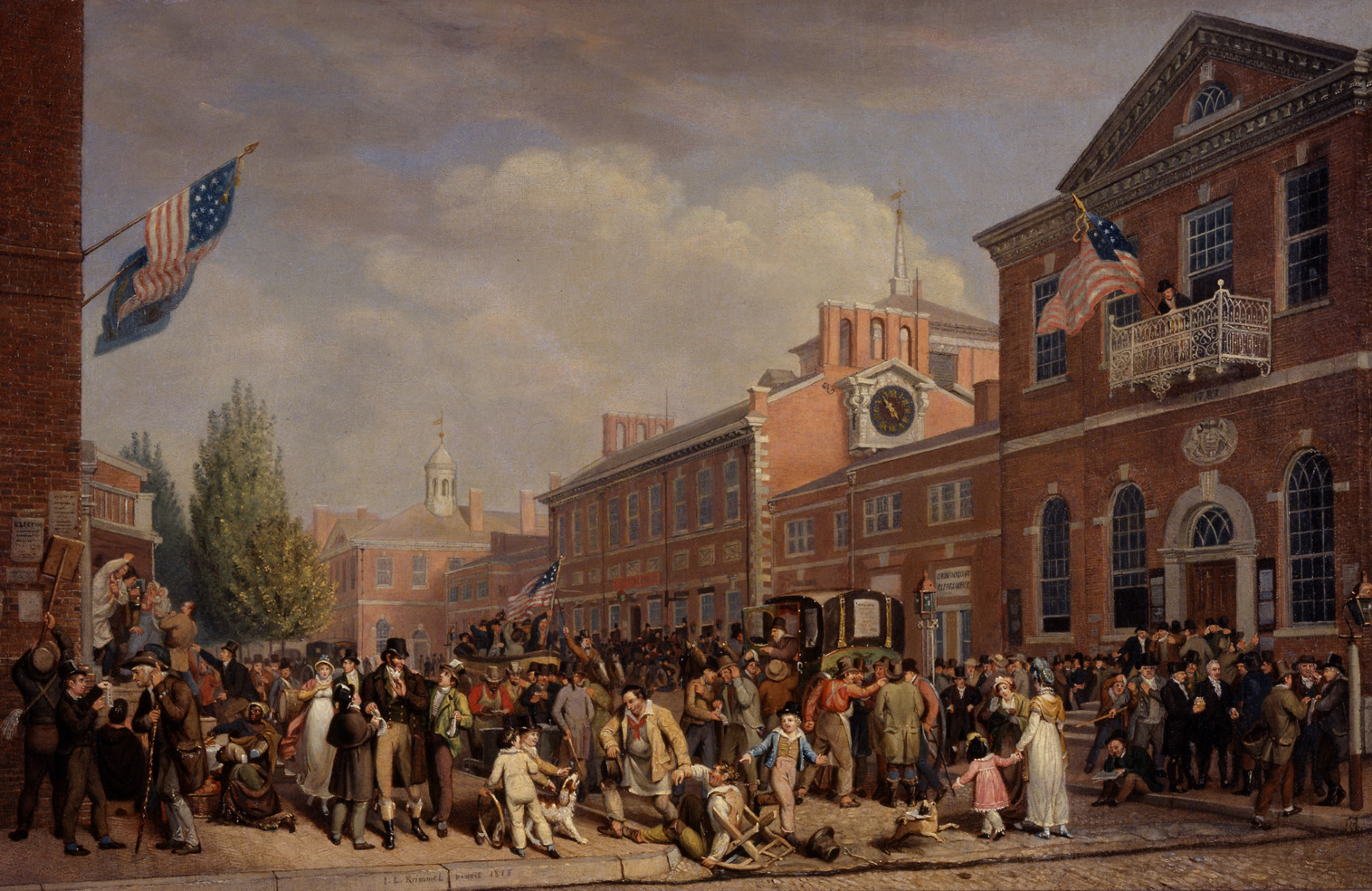
Election Day in Philadelphia by John Lewis Krimmel (1815)

=== Uncontested election ===
The failure of the Federalist Party to nominate a ticket effectively conceded the election to Monroe. In New Jersey, Ohio, Rhode Island, Vermont, and in every state south of the Potomac River, the Federalists did not seriously contest the election. Federalist unpledged electors ran in several states, and in Pennsylvania, Monroe's opponents fielded an Independent ticket supported by disaffected Democratic-Republicans and Federalists. Lacking a candidate, the opposition all but ignored the presidential race and instead reserved their energies for state and local elections in which the remnants of regional Federalist strength might still be salvaged. In New York and New Hampshire, where a real effort was made to defeat the Democratic-Republican ticket, the Federalist campaign was distracted and uncoordinated. So great was the sense of inevitability surrounding Monroe's election that most public speculation focused on the composition of his incoming cabinet.

Rufus King shared the view of nearly all observers who considered Monroe's election a foregone conclusion. He took no part in the campaign and said nothing to indicate that he considered himself a candidate. Following his gubernatorial defeat, King encouraged his colleagues to accept Monroe's election and suggested the Federalist Party should disband. Nothing in King's private correspondence mentions his candidacy for president; in a letter to Christopher Gore dated November 5, he referred to Monroe as running unopposed. The partisan press did not consider King a candidate. The Democratic-Republican Vermont Gazette laughed that Connecticut's Federalist electors "probably do not know for whom they shall vote themselves!" As late as December 3, the Federalist Boston Daily Advertiser admitted it did not know for whom the state's Federalist electors would vote. King would not learn of his selection by 34 Federalist electors until after the electoral colleges had already met.

=== Caucus system ===
The caucus system was a major issue in the campaign. A gathering of members of Congress had selected the Democratic-Republican national ticket in every consecutive election since 1796. Electoral candidates and candidates for state office were commonly chosen by similar gatherings of state legislators. By design, the caucus system gave elected lawmakers substantial influence over the choice of party nominees for state and national office. This feature attracted criticism from Federalists and anti-caucus Democratic-Republicans who argued that the practice of caucus nominations undermined democratic elections, gave undue influence to career officeholders, and potentially violated the constitutional separation of powers. With no organized opposition to Monroe, they noted that the election effectively had been decided by members of Congress and alleged that the constitutional election process had been subverted. The perception that the caucus had forced its choice upon the nation irrespective of the opinions of most voters was particularly salient. "A president is to be made thinks I," went one editorial, "but what shall we call the process? Not an election! for the people have nothing to do with it and the electors have nothing to do with it. One half of the republicans and all the federalists are against the man; but the caucus have said 'it shall be so,' and it must be so." The Federalist press made a significant effort to capitalize on opposition to the caucus. The Portland Gazette suggested that voters should boycott the election in protest against "this manifest violation of one the most important provisions of the national Charter." Anti-caucus feeling, which smoldered all through the campaign, would continue to mount over the course of the next decade, and became a major issue in the election of 1824.

=== Virginia dynasty ===
Opposition to the Virginia dynasty was a significant theme in the contest for the Democratic-Republican nomination that carried over into the general election. Three of the four previous presidents had been Virginians; the only president from New England, John Adams, served a single term from 1797 to 1801. Northern Democratic-Republicans hoped the party's caucus would nominate a candidate from their section and fixed their hopes on Tompkins, who ultimately received the vice presidency; the implied inference that a New Yorker was fit only to play second fiddle to a Virginian was a source of resentment in the North. In the aftermath of the caucus, the Federalist press attempted to keep the issue alive. In June, the Charlestown Courier reprinted an anonymous pamphlet, the Exposition of the Motives for Opposing the Nomination of Mr. Monroe for the Office of President of the United States, purportedly the work of the "fifty-four Democrats" who had voted to nominate Crawford in the caucus. Probably written by John Armstrong Jr., the piece alleged that party leaders had ruthlessly blocked the advancement of Monroe's rivals in order to continue the line of Virginian presidents, irrespective of Monroe's evident unfitness for office. Several Federalist editors suggested adopting Crawford as the party's candidate for president, but party leaders ultimately failed to agree upon this strategy.

== Results ==
Election Day by state: November 1–3, 1816: November 1, 1816; November 4–10, 1816: November 4, 1816; November 5–6, 1816; November 7, 1816; November 8, 1816; November 11–17, 1816: November 11, 1816; November 12, 1816; November 14, 1816; November 18–24, 1816: November 20, 1816; November 25–December 2, 1816: November 25, 1816; December 3–5, 1816: December 3, 1816

=== Statistics ===
Monroe won the election decisively, carrying 33 of the 39 constituencies representing 183 electoral votes. He received a majority of the electoral votes from 16 states, including every state where electors were chosen by popular vote. Three states where electors were chosen by the legislature—Connecticut, Delaware, and Massachusetts—and three popular election districts in Maryland chose unpledged Federalist electors, representing 38 electoral votes. Four Federalist electors (the three Maryland Federalists and one elector from Delaware) did not vote; the remaining 34 voted for Rufus King.

There was no agreement among the Federalists as to a vice presidential candidate. Twenty-two electors voted for Howard, all from Massachusetts; Connecticut's electors split their votes between the former U.S. senator from Pennsylvania James Ross (5) and the chief justice of the United States John Marshall (4), while three Delaware electors voted for the U.S. senator from Maryland Robert Goodloe Harper. Tompkins received the votes of all 183 Democratic-Republican electors.

=== Indiana's electoral votes ===
Indiana entered the Union as the nineteenth state on December 11, 1816. When Congress met to count the electoral votes on February 22, 1817, John W. Taylor, the member from New York's 11th congressional district, objected to counting Indiana's electoral votes on the grounds that it had not been a state at the time of the meeting of the electoral colleges. Daniel Cady, representing New York's 14th congressional district, and William Hendricks, the newly elected member from Indiana, countered that Indiana's representatives to Congress had been seated with the acceptance of the state's constitution, and that it was therefore entitled to participate in the election. Opinion in the House was overwhelmingly in favor of counting Indiana's votes. On the motion of Samuel D. Ingham, the question of the legality of Indiana's votes was postponed indefinitely, and the final electoral count was read with Indiana's votes included.

=== Electoral results ===
Electoral results
Presidential candidate	Party	Home state	Popular vote^{(a)}^{(b)}		Electoral vote^{(c)}	Running mate		
Presidential candidate	Party	Home state	Count	Percentage	Electoral vote^{(c)}	Vice-presidential candidate	Home state	Electoral vote^{(c)}
James Monroe	Democratic-Republican	Virginia	76,752	68.68%	183	Daniel D. Tompkins	New York	183
Rufus King	Federalist	New York	^{(d)}	^{(d)}	34	John E. Howard	Maryland	22
Rufus King	Federalist	New York	^{(d)}	^{(d)}	34	James Ross	Pennsylvania	5
Rufus King	Federalist	New York	^{(d)}	^{(d)}	34	John Marshall	Virginia	4
Rufus King	Federalist	New York	^{(d)}	^{(d)}	34	Robert Goodloe Harper	Maryland	3
Unpledged electors	Democratic-Republican	(n/a)	17,597	15.74%	—	(n/a)	(n/a)	—
Unpledged electors	Federalist	(n/a)	17,300	15.48%	—^{(e)}	(n/a)	(n/a)	—^{(e)}
Other			99	0.09%	—	Other		—
Total			111,748	100%	217			217
Needed to win					109			109

Source (Popular Vote): A New Nation Votes: American Election Returns 1787-1825

- a. In nine states, electors were chosen by the legislature rather than by popular vote. The ten states where electors were chosen via popular vote had widely varying restrictions on suffrage.
- b. Popular vote figures from Kentucky and Tennessee are incomplete.
- c. One elector from Delaware and three electors from Maryland did not vote.
- d. King was not formally nominated by the Federalist Party and did not campaign; his electoral votes came from unpledged electors from three states where electors were chosen by the legislature.
- e. Federalist unpledged electors carried three Maryland districts. All three electors subsequently abstained.

Popular vote
Monroe	68.7%
Unpledged electors (DR)	15.7%
Unpledged electors (F)	15.4%
Others	0.1%

Electoral vote (presidential)
Monroe	84.3%
King	15.7%

Electoral vote (vice presidential)
Tompkins	84.3%
Howard	10.1%
Ross	2.3%
Marshall	1.8%
Harper	1.4%

=== Results by state ===
Nineteenth century election laws required voters to vote directly for members of the Electoral College rather than for president. This sometimes resulted in small differences in the number of votes cast for electors pledged to the same presidential candidate if some voters did not vote for all the electors nominated by a party, or if one or several electors ran on multiple tickets. In most cases, this table compares the results for the most popular elector pledged to each ticket. For the single-member electoral districts in Maryland, all votes for electors pledged to one party or nominee are counted in cases where multiple electors were pledged to the same presidential candidate. In Pennsylvania, four electors ran on both the Democratic-Republican and the Independent ticket and were elected without opposition; this table counts the result for the most popular elector to run exclusively on the Democratic-Republican ticket (William Gilliland) for Monroe, and the result for the most popular elector to run exclusively on the Independent ticket (Andrew Gregg) for the Others. Returns from Tennessee and one Kentucky district appear to have been lost.

State or district	Electoral votes	James Monroe Democratic-Republican			Unpledged electors (Note: Except as noted, the Federalist electors voted for Rufus King.) Federalist			Others			Margin		Total	Citation
State or district	Electoral votes	No.	%	Electoral votes	No.	%	Electoral votes	No.	%	Electoral votes	No.	%	Total	Citation
Connecticut	9	*		—	*		9	*		—	*		—	
Delaware	4	*		—	*		4 (Note: One elector did not vote; the three remaining electors voted for Rufus King.)	*		—	*		—	
Georgia	8	*		8	*		—	*		—	*		—	
Indiana	3	*		3	*		—	*		—	*		—	
Kentucky–1 (Note: Returns from this district appear to have been lost.)	4	**		4	**		—	**		—	**		**	
Kentucky–2	4	1,508	100.0	4	—		—	—		—	1,508	100.0	1,508	
Kentucky–3	4	356	100.0	4	—		—	—		—	356	100.0	356	
Louisiana	3	*		3	*		—	*		—	*		—	
Maryland–1	1	2	0.74	—	270	99.26	1 (Note: Did not vote)	—		—	268	98.52	272	
Maryland–2	1	523	73.7	1	184	25.9	—	3	0.4	—	339	47.8	710	
Maryland–3	2	1,440	99.0	2	13	0.9	—	2	0.1	—	1,427	98.1	1,455	
Maryland–4	2	1,855	95.6	2	—		—	85	4.4	—	1,722	91.4	1,938	
Maryland–5	1	693	100.0	1	—		—	—		—	693	100.0	693	
Maryland–6	1	938	67.9	1	435	31.5	—	9	0.6	—	503	36.4	1,382	
Maryland–7	1	750	100.0	1	—		—	—		—	750	100.0	750	
Maryland–8	1	1,272	48.9	—	1,338	51.1	1	—		—	-56	-2.2	2,610	
Maryland–9	1	30	3.3	—	886	96.7	1	—		—	-856	-93.4	916	
Massachusetts	22	*		—	*		22	*		—	*		—	
New Hampshire	8	15,225	53.3	8	13,338	46.7	—	—		—	1,887	6.6	28,563	
New Jersey	8	5,441	99.0	8	54	1.0	—	—		—	5,387	98.0	5,495	
New York	29	*		29	*		—	*		—	*		—	
North Carolina	15	9,549	98.4	15	158	1.6	—	—		—	9,391	96.7	9,707	
Ohio	8	3,326	84.9	8	593	15.1	—	—		—	2,733	69.7	3,919	
Pennsylvania	25	25,749	59.4	25	27	0.1	—	17,597	40.6	—	8,152	18.8	43,346	
Rhode Island	4	1,236	100.0	4	—		—	—		—	1,236	100.0	1,236	
South Carolina	11	*		11	*		—	*		—	*		—	
Tennessee–1	1	**		1	**		—	**		—	**		**	
Tennessee–2	1	**		1	**		—	**		—	**		**	
Tennessee–3	1	**		1	**		—	**		—	**		**	
Tennessee–4	1	**		1	**		—	**		—	**		**	
Tennessee–5	1	**		1	**		—	**		—	**		**	
Tennessee–6	1	**		1	**		—	**		—	**		**	
Tennessee–7	1	**		1	**		—	**		—	**		**	
Tennessee–8	1	**		1	**		—	**		—	**		**	
Vermont	8	*		8	*		—	*		—	*		—	
Virginia	25	6,859	99.9	25	4	0.1	—	—		—	6,855	99.8	—	
TOTALS	221	76,752	68.7	183	17,300	15.5	38	17,696	15.8	0	59,489	53.2	111,748	

==== States and districts that flipped from Federalist to Democratic-Republican ====
- Maryland's 2nd electoral district
- Maryland's 4th electoral district
- New York
- New Jersey
- New Hampshire
- Rhode Island

==== Districts that flipped from Democratic-Republican to Federalist ====
- Maryland's 8th electoral district

==== Close states and districts ====
Districts where the margin of victory was less than 5 percentage points:

1. Maryland's 8th electoral district, 2.2% (56 votes)

States where the margin of victory was less than 10 percentage points:

1. New Hampshire, 6.3% (1,813 votes)

=== Electoral votes by state ===
State	Electoral votes	For President			For Vice President					
State	Electoral votes	JM	RK	B	DT	JH	JR	JM	RH	B
Connecticut	9	—	9	—	—	—	5	4	—	—
Delaware	4	—	3	1	—	—	—	—	3	1
Georgia	8	8	—	—	8	—	—	—	—	—
Indiana	3	3	—	—	3	—	—	—	—	—
Kentucky	12	12	—	—	12	—	—	—	—	—
Louisiana	3	3	—	—	3	—	—	—	—	—
Maryland	11	8	—	3	8	—	—	—	—	3
Massachusetts	22	—	22	—	—	22	—	—	—	—
New Hampshire	8	8	—	—	8	—	—	—	—	—
New Jersey	8	8	—	—	8	—	—	—	—	—
New York	29	29	—	—	29	—	—	—	—	—
North Carolina	15	15	—	—	15	—	—	—	—	—
Ohio	8	8	—	—	8	—	—	—	—	—
Pennsylvania	25	25	—	—	25	—	—	—	—	—
Rhode Island	4	4	—	—	4	—	—	—	—	—
South Carolina	11	11	—	—	11	—	—	—	—	—
Tennessee	8	8	—	—	8	—	—	—	—	—
Vermont	8	8	—	—	8	—	—	—	—	—
Virginia	25	25	—	—	25	—	—	—	—	—
TOTAL	221	183	34	4	183	22	5	4	3	4
TO WIN	109				109					

=== Maps ===
Electoral College map (president)

Electoral College map (vice president)

Popular vote by state

Map of presidential election results by county, shaded according to the vote share of the highest result for an elector of any given candidate

Map of presidential election results by electoral district, shaded according to the vote share of the highest result for an elector of any given candidate. Electoral boundaries for Maryland and most of Tennessee could not be found

== Electoral college selection ==
Method of choosing electors	State(s)
Electors were chosen by the state legislature	Connecticut; Delaware; Georgia; Indiana; Louisiana; Massachusetts; New York; South Carolina; Vermont
Electors were chosen by voters in a statewide election	New Hampshire; New Jersey; North Carolina; Ohio; Pennsylvania; Rhode Island; Virginia
Electors were chosen by voters from single- or multi-member districts	Kentucky; Maryland; Tennessee

== See also ==
- First inauguration of James Monroe
- History of the United States (1789-1849)
- 1816–17 United States House of Representatives elections
- 1816–17 United States Senate elections

== Bibliography ==
- "1816 Electoral College Results". National Archives.
- Dubin, Michael J. (2002). United States Presidential Elections, 1788–1860: The Official Results by County and State. Jefferson, NC: McFarland & Co.
- Howe, Daniel (2007). What Hath God Wrought: The Transformation of America, 1815–1848. Oxford University Press. ISBN 978-0-19-507894-7.
- Lampi, Philip J. (n.d.). "Electoral College". A New Nation Votes. American Antiquarian Society.
- Morgan, William G. (October 1972). "The Congressional Nominating Caucus of 1816: The Struggle against the Virginia Dynasty". Virginia Magazine of History and Biography. 80 (4): 461–75.
- Ratcliffe, Donald J. (Spring 2014). "Popular Preferences in the Presidential Election of 1824". Journal of the Early Republic. 34 (1): 45–77. JSTOR 24486931.
- Remini, Robert V. (July 1950). "New York and the Presidential Election of 1816". New York History. 31 (3): 308–24.
- Skeen, Carl Edward (2003). 1816: America Rising. Lexington: University Press of Kentucky.
- Turner, Lynn W. (2002). "Elections of 1816 and 1820". In Schlesinger, Arthur M. Jr.; Israel, Fred L. (eds.). History of American Presidential Elections, 1789–2001. Vol. 1. Philadelphia: Chelsea House Publishers. pp. 298–345.
