= 1816 United States presidential election in Tennessee =

- November 7, 1816
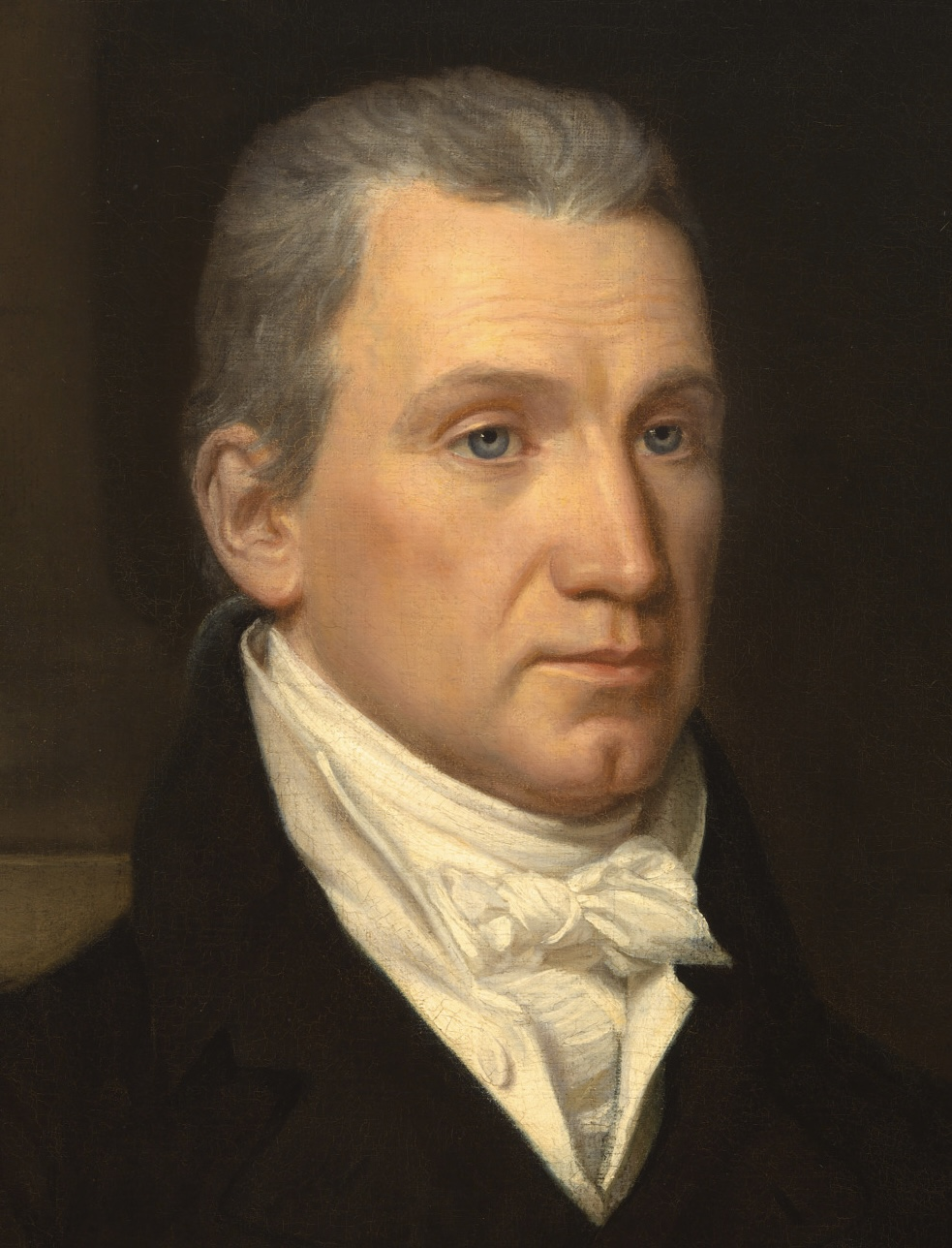
Nominee	James Monroe
Party	Democratic-Republican
Home state	Virginia
Running mate	Daniel D. Tompkins
Electoral vote	8
Electoral district results
Monroe
Unknown/no vote
President before election
James Madison
Democratic-Republican
Elected President
James Monroe
Democratic-Republican

A presidential election was held in Tennessee on November 7, 1816 as part of the 1816 United States presidential election. The Democratic-Republican ticket of the U.S. secretary of state James Monroe and the governor of New York Daniel D. Tompkins was elected unopposed. The Federalist Party failed to nominate a candidate. In the national election, Monroe easily defeated the senior U.S. senator from New York Rufus King, who received 34 votes from unpledged electors despite not being a candidate.

== General election ==
=== Summary ===
Tennessee chose eight electors from as many single-member electoral districts. Returns from the election have been lost. In several districts, multiple candidates ran pledged to Monroe and Tompkins.

1816 United States presidential election in Tennessee
Party	Candidate	Votes	%
Democratic-Republican	James Monroe Daniel D. Tompkins	**	**
Total votes		**	100.00

=== Results by district ===
Robert Allen, James Baxter, Samuel Buchanan, David Campbell, Alfred M. Carter, Joseph Hamilton, Adam Huntsman, and Alexander MacClanahan (Note: Possibly called Matthew M'Clanahan or Martin McClanahan.) were elected and voted for Monroe and Tompkins. Returns from the district elections have been lost. Carter was elected from the 1st district, apparently without opposition; Huntsman defeated John W. Simpson in the 4th district race; while MacClanahan defeated Edward Ward in the 6th district. It is not known from which districts the five remaining electors were elected. The district boundaries are taken from Michael J. Dubin's United States Presidential Elections, 1788–1860.

District	Electoral votes	James Monroe Democratic-Republican			Total
District	Electoral votes	Votes	Percent	Electoral votes	Total
Tennessee–1	1	**		1	**
Tennessee–2	1	**		1	**
Tennessee–3	1	**		1	**
Tennessee–4	1	**		1	**
Tennessee–5	1	**		1	**
Tennessee–6	1	**		1	**
Tennessee–7	1	**		1	**
Tennessee–8	1	**		1	**
TOTAL	8	**	**	8	**

==== District 1 ====
Carter — Greene — Hawkins — Sullivan — Washington

1816 United States presidential election in Tennessee's 1st electoral district (Note: No surviving returns)
Party	Candidate	Votes	%
Democratic-Republican	Alfred M. Carter	**	**
Total votes		**	100.00

==== District 2 ====
Claiborne — Cocke — Grainger — Jefferson — Sevier

==== District 3 ====
Anderson — Blount — Campbell — Knox — Roane

==== District 4 ====
Bledsoe — Franklin — Jackson — Overton — Rhea — Warren — White

1816 United States presidential election in Tennessee's 4th electoral district
Party	Candidate	Votes	%
Democratic-Republican	Adam Huntsman	**	**
Democratic-Republican	John W. Simpson	**	**
Total votes		**	100.00

==== District 5 ====
Smith — Sumner — Wilson

==== District 6 ====
Bedford — Davidson — Lincoln — Rutherford

1816 United States presidential election in Tennessee's 6th electoral district
Party	Candidate	Votes	%
Democratic-Republican	Alexander MacClanahan	**	**
Democratic-Republican	Edward Ward	**	**
Total votes		**	100.00

==== District 7 ====
Giles — Maury — Williamson

==== District 8 ====
Dickson — Hickman — Humphreys — Montgomery — Robertson — Stewart

=== Electoral college ===
1816 United States Electoral College vote in Tennessee
For President				For Vice President			
Candidate	Party	Home state	Electoral vote	Candidate	Party	Home state	Electoral vote
James Monroe	Democratic-Republican	Virginia	8	Daniel D. Tompkins	Democratic-Republican	New York	8
Total			8	Total			8

== See also ==
- United States presidential elections in Tennessee

== Bibliography ==
- Dubin, Michael J. (2002). United States Presidential Elections, 1788–1860: The Official Results by County and State. Jefferson, NC: McFarland & Co.
- Lampi, Philip J. (January 11, 2012a). "Tennessee 1816 Electoral College, Carter, Greene, Hawkins, Sullivan and Washington Counties". A New Nation Votes. American Antiquarian Society.
- Lampi, Philip J. (January 11, 2012b). "Tennessee 1816 Electoral College, Bledsoe, Franklin, Jackson, Overton, Rhea, Warren and White Counties". A New Nation Votes. American Antiquarian Society.
- Lampi, Philip J. (January 11, 2012c). "Tennessee 1816 Electoral College, Bedford, Davidson and Rutherford Counties". A New Nation Votes. American Antiquarian Society.
- Lampi, Philip J. (January 11, 2012d). "1816 President of the United States, Electoral College". A New Nation Votes. American Antiquarian Society.
- National Archives and Records Administration (n.d.). "1816 Electoral College Results". National Archives.
- Speer, Ed (Summer 2001). "Tennessee's Presidential Electors, 1796-1836". Tennessee Historical Quarterly. 60 (2): 120–26.
- State of Tennessee (1815). Acts Passed at the First Session of the Eleventh General Assembly of the State of Tennessee [...]. Nashville.
- Turner, Lynn W. (2002). "Elections of 1816 and 1820". In Schlesinger, Arthur M. Jr.; Israel, Fred L. (eds.). History of American Presidential Elections, 1789–2001. Vol. 1. Philadelphia: Chelsea House Publishers. pp. 298–345.
