= 1816 United States presidential election in Connecticut =

- November 1, 1816
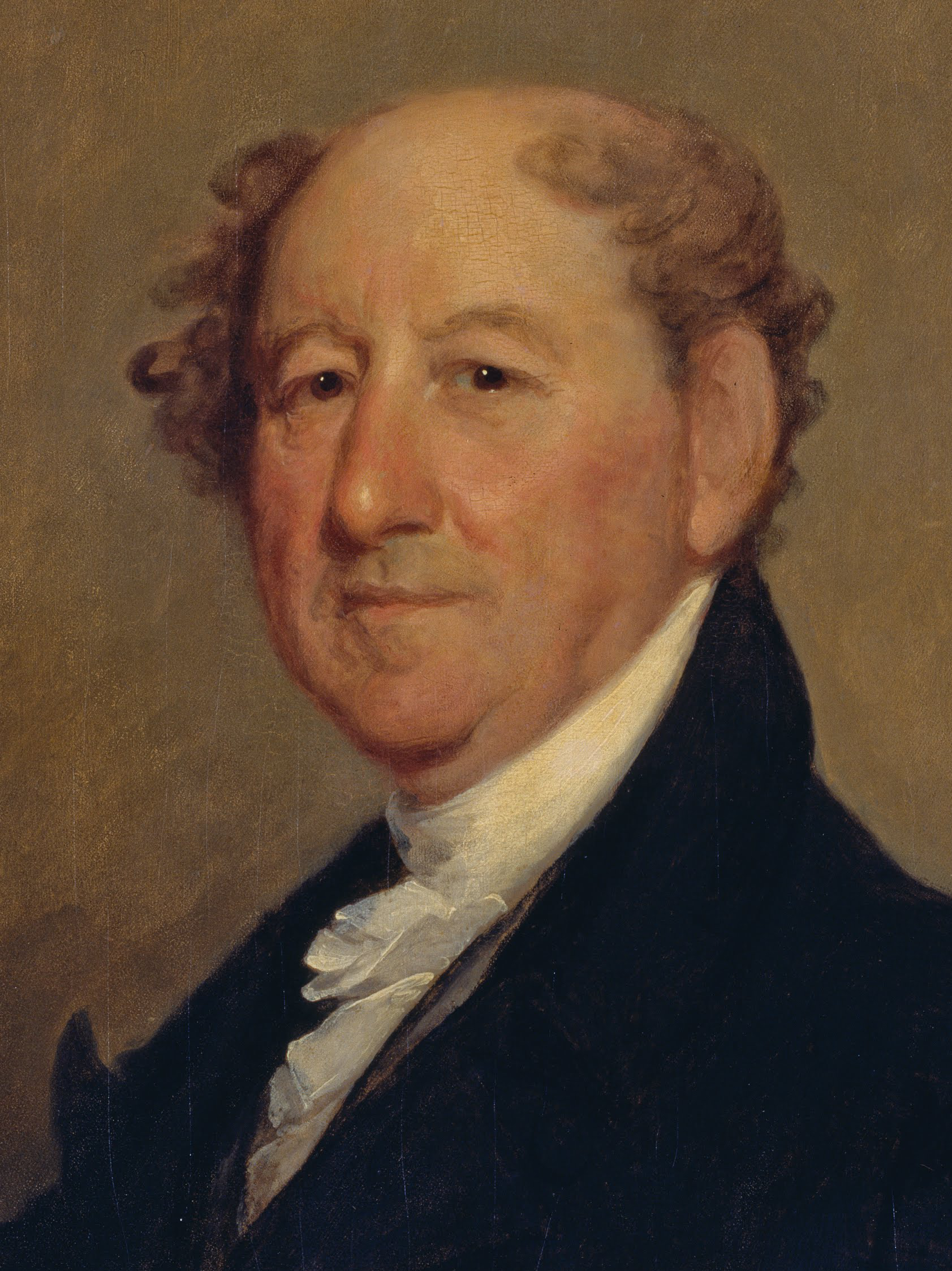

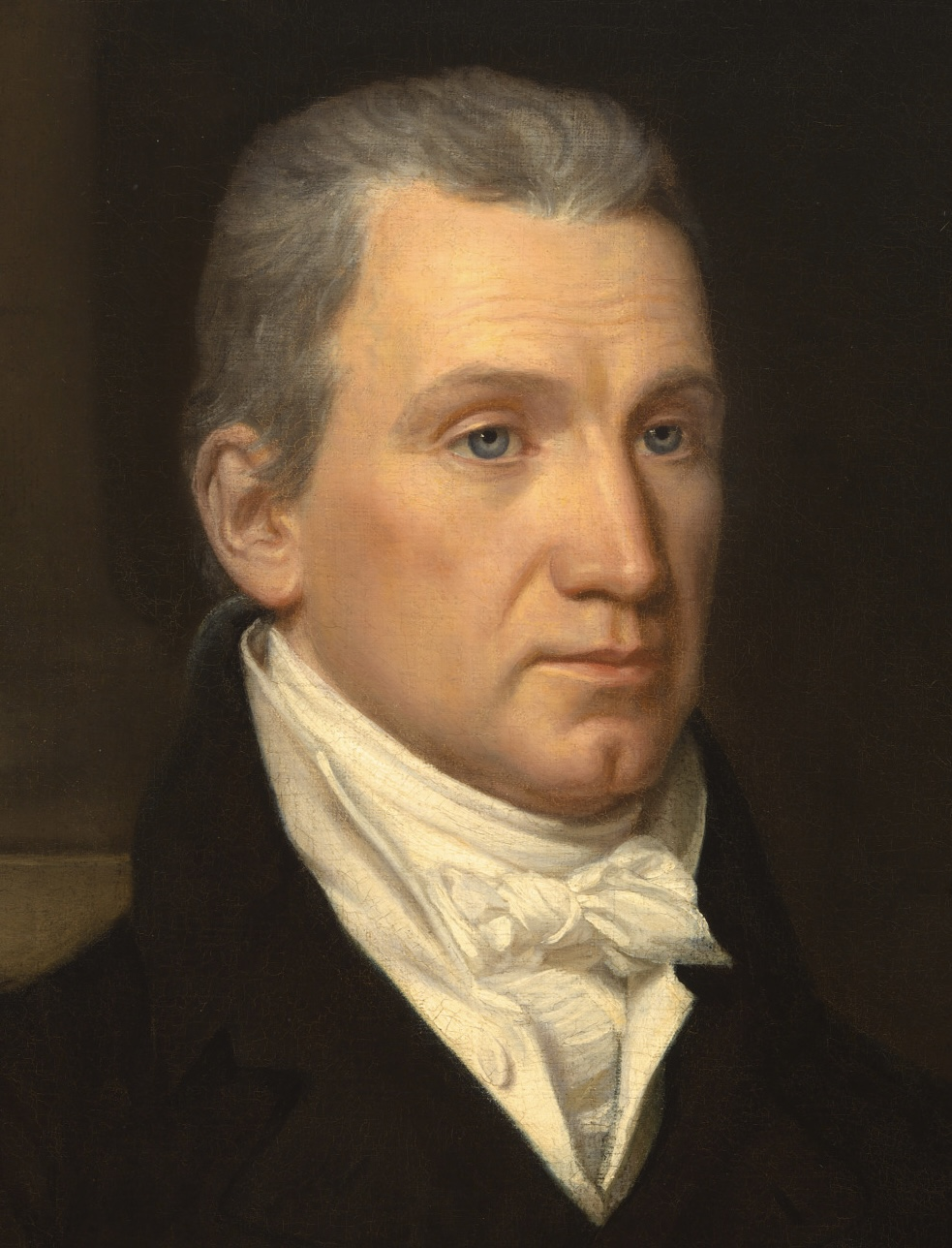
Nominee	Rufus King	James Monroe
Party	Federalist	Democratic-Republican
Home state	New York	Virginia
Running mate	N/A (Note: No candidate formally nominated. Connecticut electors cast 5 votes for James Ross and 4 votes for John Marshall.)	Daniel D. Tompkins
Electoral vote	9	0
Legislative vote	**	88
President before election
James Madison
Democratic-Republican
Elected President
James Monroe
Democratic-Republican

A presidential election was held in Connecticut on November 1, 1816 as part of the 1816 United States presidential election. The senior U.S. senator from New York Rufus King, the de facto candidate of the Federalist Party, received nine votes from electors chosen by the Connecticut General Assembly. Although commonly remembered as the last Federalist presidential candidate, King was not formally selected as the party's nominee and had no designated running mate; the Connecticut electors split their vice presidential votes between the former U.S. senator from Pennsylvania James Ross and the chief justice of the United States John Marshall. This was the last election in which Connecticut's electoral votes were awarded by the state legislature.

== General election ==
=== Results ===
1816 United States presidential election in Connecticut (Note: Results of balloting in the Connecticut General Assembly. The number of votes cast for the successful Federalist candidates is unknown.)
Party	Elector	Votes
Federalist	Elijah Hubbard	**
Federalist	Jonathan Ingersoll	**
Federalist	Jirah Isham	**
Federalist	Samuel W. Johnson	**
Federalist	William Perkins	**
Federalist	Seth P. Staples	**
Federalist	Elisha Sterling	**
Federalist	Nathaniel Terry	**
Federalist	Asa Willey	**
Democratic-Republican	Oliver Wolcott Jr.	88
Total		>88

=== Electoral college ===
1816 United States Electoral College vote in Connecticut
For President				For Vice President			
Candidate	Party	Home state	Electoral vote	Candidate	Party	Home state	Electoral vote
Rufus King	Federalist	New York	9	James Ross	Federalist	Pennsylvania	5
Rufus King	Federalist	New York	9	John Marshall	Federalist	Virginia	4
Total			9	Total			9

== See also ==
- United States presidential elections in Connecticut
