= 1816 United States presidential election in Maryland =

- November 11, 1816
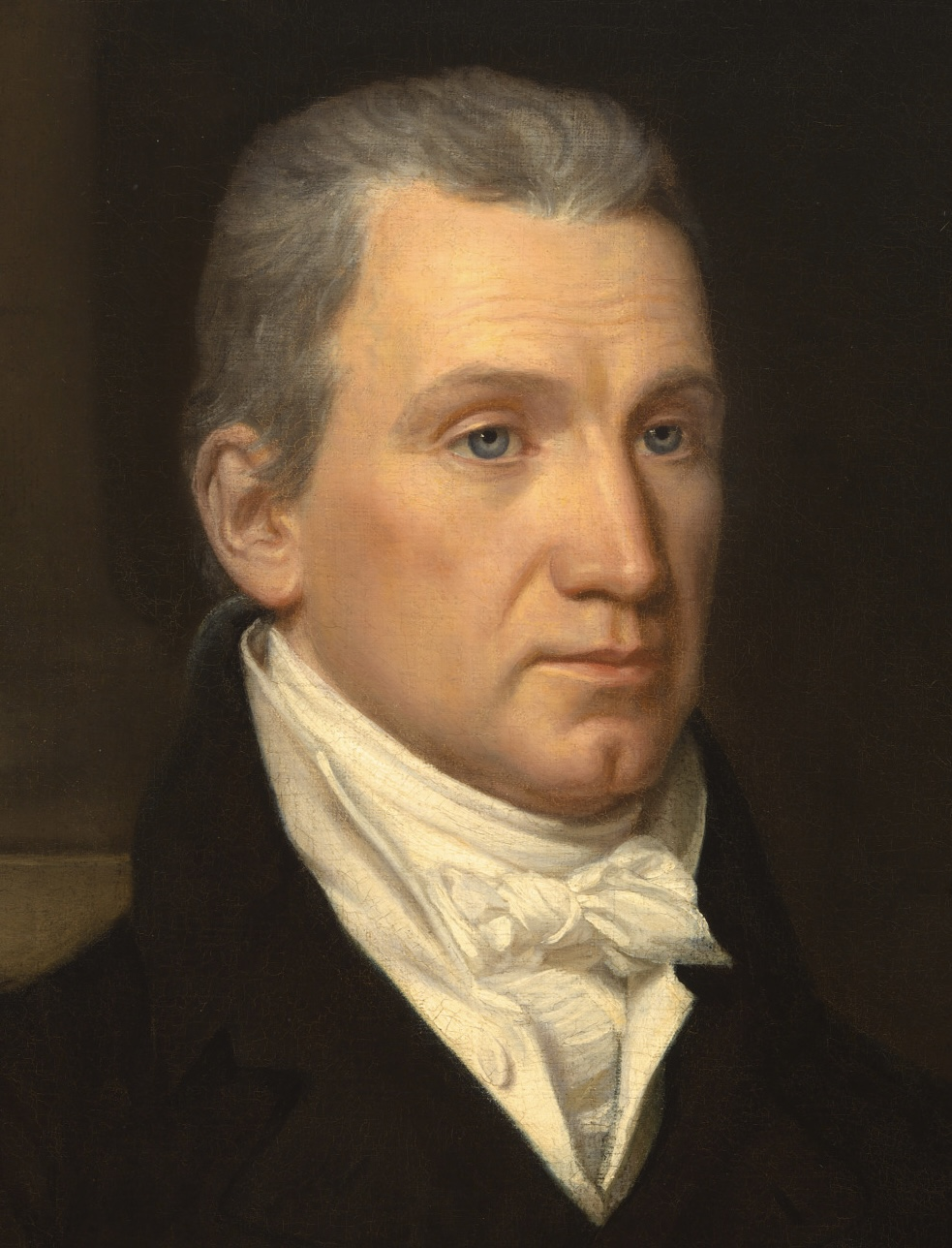

Nominee	James Monroe	Unpledged electors
Party	Democratic-Republican	Federalist
Home state	Virginia	N/A
Running mate	Daniel D. Tompkins	N/A (Note: No candidate was formally nominated.)
Electoral vote	8	0 (Note: Three Federalists were elected but did not vote.)
Popular vote	7,513	3,126
Percentage	69.97%	29.11%
County results
Monroe
50–60%
60–70%
70–80%
80–90%
90–100%
Federalist electors
50–60%
90–100%
President before election
James Madison
Democratic-Republican
Elected President
James Monroe
Democratic-Republican

A presidential election was held in Maryland on November 11, 1816, as part of the 1816 United States presidential election. The Democratic-Republican ticket of the U.S. secretary of state James Monroe and the governor of New York Daniel D. Tompkins defeated the Federalist ticket. Although the Federalists failed to nominate a presidential candidate, Federalist unpledged electors carried three single-member districts; the electors chosen from these districts subsequently abstained from the Electoral College vote. Monroe carried the remaining six districts, including two multi-member districts, worth a combined eight electoral votes. Monroe won the national election handily, defeating the senior U.S. senator from New York Rufus King, who received 34 votes from unpledged electors despite not being a candidate.

== General election ==
=== Summary ===
Maryland chose 11 electors from nine electoral districts—seven single-member districts and two districts represented by two members apiece. Nineteenth century election laws required voters to vote directly for members of the Electoral College rather than for president. This sometimes resulted in small differences in the number of votes cast for electors pledged to the same presidential candidate if some voters did not vote for all the electors nominated by a party, or if multiple tickets pledged to the same candidate appeared. This table counts all votes for Democratic-Republican electors in single-member districts as votes for Monroe and all votes for Federalist electors as votes for unpledged electors; for the two multi-member districts, the most popular elector from each ticket is counted. Electors whose allegiance could not be determined are counted separately.

1816 United States presidential election in Maryland
Party	Candidate	Votes	%
Democratic-Republican	James Monroe Daniel D. Tompkins	7,513	69.97
Federalist	Unpledged electors	3,126	29.11
Write-in		99	0.92
Total votes		10,736	100.00

=== Results by district ===
District	Electoral votes	James Monroe Democratic-Republican			Unpledged electors Federalist			Others			Margin		Total
District	Electoral votes	No.	%	Electoral votes	No.	%	Electoral votes	No.	%	Electoral votes	No.	%	Total
Maryland–1	1	2	0.74	—	270	99.26	1 (Note: Did not vote)	—		—	268	98.52	272
Maryland–2	1	523	73.66	1	184	25.92	—	3	0.42	—	339	47.74	710
Maryland–3	2	1,440	98.97	2	13	0.89	—	2	0.14	—	1,427	98.08	1,455
Maryland–4	2	1,855	95.62	2	—		—	85	4.43	—	1,720	91.19	1,940
Maryland–5	1	693	100.00	1	—		—	—		—	693	100.00	693
Maryland–6	1	938	67.87	1	435	31.48	—	9	0.65	—	503	36.39	1,382
Maryland–7	1	750	100.0	1	—		—	—		—	750	100.0	750
Maryland–8	1	1,282	48.74	—	1,338	51.26	1	—		—	-56	-2.52	2,610
Maryland–9	1	30	3.28	—	886	96.72	1	—		—	-856	-93.44	916
Totals	11	7,513	69.97	8	3,126	29.11	3	99	0.92	0	4,387	40.86	10,738

==== District 1 ====
1816 United States presidential election in Maryland's 1st electoral district
Party	Candidate	Votes	%
Federalist	William D. Beall	270	99.26
Democratic-Republican	James Fenwick	1	0.37
Democratic-Republican	Thomas Latimer	1	0.37
Total votes		272	100.00

==== District 2 ====
1816 United States presidential election in Maryland's 2nd electoral district
Party	Candidate	Votes	%
Democratic-Republican	Joseph Kent	520	73.24
Federalist	James Somerville	111	15.63
Federalist	Edward Calvert	43	6.06
Federalist	Thomas Somerville	30	4.22
Democratic-Republican	Levin Lawrence	3	0.42
None	John Galloway	1	0.14
None	William Bayford	1	0.14
None	Alexander Somer	1	0.14
Total votes		710	100.00

==== District 3 ====
1816 United States presidential election in Maryland's 3rd electoral district
Party	Candidate	Votes	%
Democratic-Republican	Edward Johnson John Stephen (Note: Received 1,429 votes)	1,440	98.97
Federalist	Owen Dorsey Thomas Davis	8	0.55
Federalist	Bruce J. Worthington Thomas Hood	5	0.34
None	Matthais Hammond; Robert Strickler	1	0.07
None	Benjamin Luceill; Jonas Green	1	0.07
Total votes		1,455	100.00

==== District 4 ====
1816 United States presidential election in Maryland's 4th electoral district
Party	Candidate	Votes	%
Democratic-Republican	John Buchanan Lawrence Brengle	1,855	95.36
None	Philip Marguam; Dennis A. Howard	22	1.13
None	George M. Lavingen; Robert Little	20	1.03
None	John Thomas; Joseph Johnson	13	0.67
None	Joseph Shoemaker; Burger Magruder	5	0.31
None	John Rohiback; John Gicks	3	0.15
None	Peter Wissinger	2	0.10
None	John Bell	1	0.05
None	William Bernard	1	0.05
None	Henry Bideman	1	0.05
None	Jacob Bohn; Patrick Quinn	1	0.05
None	Nathan Burris	1	0.05
None	Benjamin Corrington	1	0.05
None	William Corrington	1	0.05
None	Samuel Cassel	1	0.05
None	Henry Cronice	1	0.05
None	John Doogan; William Ferguson	1	0.05
None	Samuel Egilberner	1	0.05
None	James Henderson	1	0.05
None	Enoch Kintzel	1	0.05
None	Seth Lane	1	0.05
None	Jacob Lantz	1	0.05
None	Michael M. Lavingen	1	0.05
None	Zebulon Kuhn; Michael Wattman	1	0.05
None	John Rohiback; Daniel Gicks	1	0.05
None	Otho Holland Williams	1	0.05
None	Andrew Willis	1	0.05
Total votes		1,940	100.00

==== District 5 ====
1816 United States presidential election in Maryland's 5th electoral district
Party	Candidate	Votes	%
Democratic-Republican	George Warner	693	100.00
Total votes		693	100.00

==== District 6 ====
1816 United States presidential election in Maryland's 6th electoral district
Party	Candidate	Votes	%
Democratic-Republican	William C. Miller	938	67.87
Federalist	Reuben Stamp	435	31.48
None	Ebenezer N. Allen	2	0.14
None	William Billingslea	2	0.14
None	William Allen	1	0.07
None	Isaac Hollingsworth	1	0.07
None	Thomas W. Bond	1	0.07
None	Walden G. Middleton	1	0.07
None	Francis Wheeler	1	0.07
Total votes		1,382	100.00

==== District 7 ====
1816 United States presidential election in Maryland's 7th electoral district
Party	Candidate	Votes	%
Democratic-Republican	Benjamin Massey	680	90.67
Democratic-Republican	Vachol Keene	39	5.2
Democratic-Republican	John L. Blake	23	3.07
Democratic-Republican	Samuel Ringgold	6	0.80
Democratic-Republican	Kensey Harrison	2	0.27
Total votes		750	100.00

==== District 8 ====
1816 United States presidential election in Maryland's 8th electoral district
Party	Candidate	Votes	%
Federalist	Thomas Ennalls	1,338	51.26
Democratic-Republican	John Bennett	1,272	48.74
Total votes		2,610	100.00

==== District 9 ====
1816 United States presidential election in Maryland's 9th electoral district
Party	Candidate	Votes	%
Federalist	Littleton Dennis Jr.	886	96.72
Democratic-Republican	Lemuel Purnel	27	2.95
Democratic-Republican	Samuel LeCompte	1	0.11
Democratic-Republican	William LeCompte	1	0.11
Democratic-Republican	Peter Dasheill	1	0.11
Total votes		916	100.00

=== Results by county ===
County	D	James Monroe Democratic-Republican		Unpledged electors Federalist		Others		Margin		Total
County	D	Votes	Percent	Votes	Percent	Votes	Percent	Votes	Percent	Total
Allegany	4	217	87.15	—		32	12.85	185	74.30	249
Anne Arundel	3	475	98.55	5	1.04	2	0.41	470	97.51	482
Baltimore	5	693	100.00	—		—		693	100.00	693
City of Baltimore	3	944	100.00	—		—		944	100.00	944
Calvert	2	141	75.40	43	22.99	3	1.60	98	52.41	187
Caroline	8	446	43.18	587	56.82	—		-141	-13.64	1,033
Cecil	6	448	52.09	412	47.91	—		436	4.18	860
Charles	1	2	1.68	117	98.32	—		-115	-96.64	119
Dorchester	8	265	72.40	101	27.60	—		164	44.80	366
Dorchester	9	2	0.82	242	99.18	—		-240	-98.36	244
Dorchester	Tot.	267	43.77	343	56.23	—		-76	-12.46	610
Frederick	4	922	95.74	—		41	4.26	881	91.48	963
Harford	6	490	93.87	23	4.41	9	1.72	467	89.46	522
Kent	7	308	100.00	—		—		308	100.00	308
Montgomery	2	74	100.00	—		—		74	100.00	74
Montgomery	3	21	72.41	8	27.59	—		11	44.82	29
Montgomery	Tot.	95	92.23	8	7.77	—		87	84.46	103
Prince George's	1	—		54	100.00	—		-54	-100.00	54
Prince George's	2	308	68.60	141	31.40	—		167	37.20	449
Prince George's	Tot.	308	61.23	195	38.77	—		113	22.46	503
Queen Anne's	7	442	100.0	—		—		442	100.0	442
Somerset	9	13	3.93	318	96.07	—		-305	-92.14	331
St. Mary's	1	—		99	100.00	—		-99	-100.00	99
Talbot	8	561	46.32	650	53.67	—		-89	-7.35	1,211
Washington	4	717	98.35	—		12	1.65	705	96.71	729
Worcester	9	15	4.40	326	95.60	—		-311	-91.20	341
Total		7,513	69.97	3,126	29.11	99	0.92	4,387	40.86	10,738

==== Counties that flipped from Federalist to Democratic-Republican ====
- Allegany
- Cecil
- Frederick
- Kent
- Montgomery
- Prince George's

=== Electoral college ===
1816 United States Electoral College vote in Maryland
For president				For vice president			
Candidate	Party	Home state	Electoral vote	Candidate	Party	Home state	Electoral vote
James Monroe	Democratic-Republican	Virginia	8	Daniel D. Tompkins	Democratic-Republican	New York	8
Not cast			3	Not cast			3
Total			11	Total			11

== See also ==
- United States presidential elections in Maryland
- 1816 United States presidential election
- 1816 United States elections
