= 1816 United States presidential election in Louisiana =

- November 25, 1816
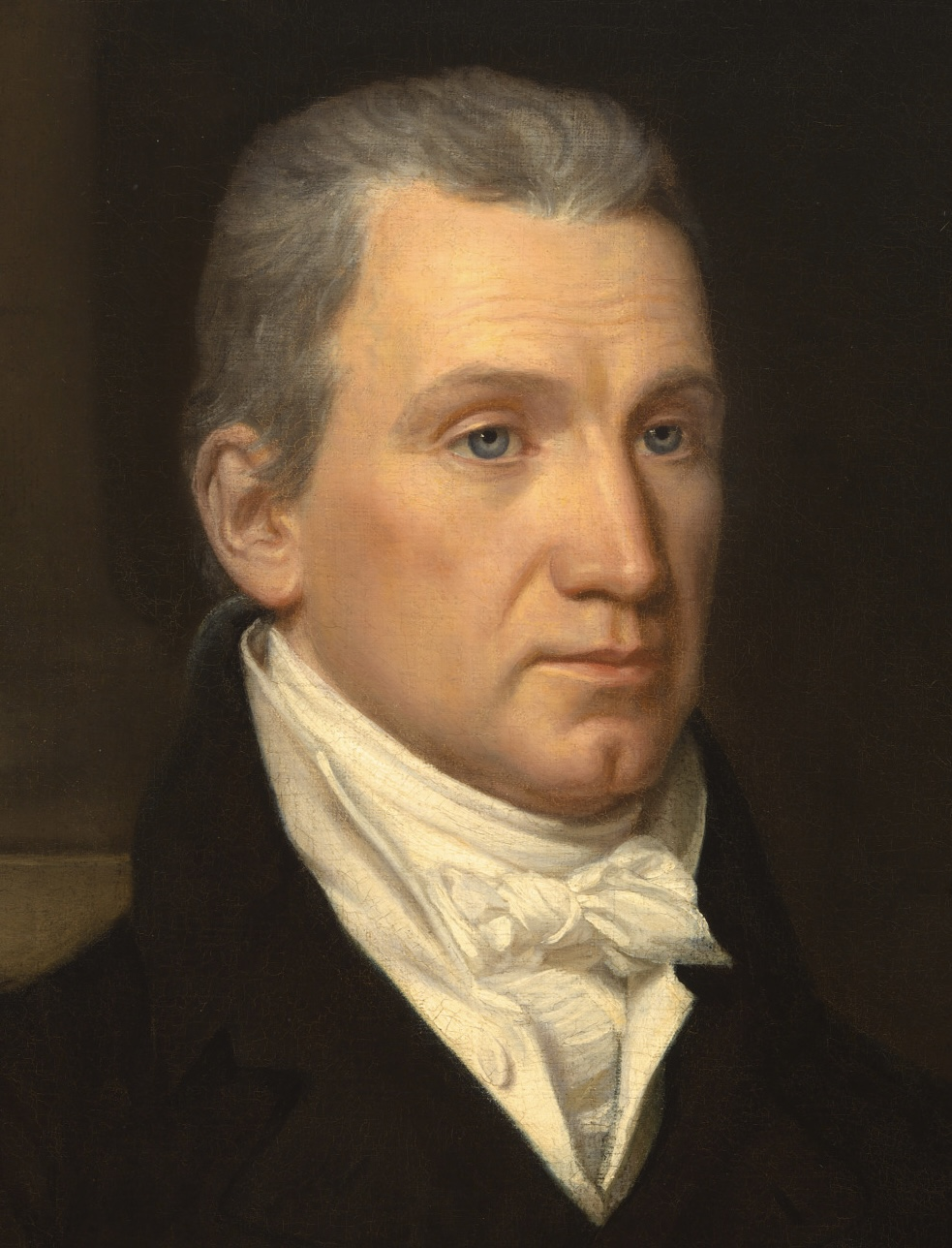
Nominee	James Monroe
Party	Democratic-Republican
Home state	Virginia
Running mate	Daniel D. Tompkins
Electoral vote	3
Legislative vote	31
Percentage	67.4%
President before election
James Madison
Democratic-Republican
Elected President
James Monroe
Democratic-Republican

A presidential election was held in Louisiana on November 25, 1816 as part of the 1816 United States presidential election. The Democratic-Republican ticket of the U.S. secretary of state James Monroe and the governor of New York Daniel D. Tompkins received three votes from electors chosen by the Louisiana State Legislature. The Federalist Party failed to nominate a candidate. Monroe won the national election handily, defeating the senior U.S. senator from New York Rufus King, who received 34 votes from unpledged electors despite not being a candidate.

== General election ==
=== Results ===
1816 United States presidential election in Louisiana (Note: Results of balloting in the Louisiana State Legislature.)
Party	Candidate	Legislative election			
Party	Candidate	1st	2nd	3rd	4th
Democratic-Republican	Garrigues Flaugeac	31	Elected		
Democratic-Republican	John R. Grymes	29	Elected		
Democratic-Republican	Squire Lea	18	21	22	24
None	Julien Poydras	17	14	16	21
None	Fielding L. Turner	17	5	—	—
None	Elijah Clark	14	4	1	1
None	Henry Bry	9	1	—	—
None	Bartlet Collins	4	—	8	—
None	Macroudon	1	—	—	—
None	Flood	1	—	—	—
Total		46	45	47	46

=== Electoral college ===
1816 United States Electoral College vote in Louisiana
For President				For Vice President			
Candidate	Party	Home state	Electoral vote	Candidate	Party	Home state	Electoral vote
James Monroe	Democratic-Republican	Virginia	3	Daniel D. Tompkins	Democratic-Republican	New York	3
Total			3	Total			3

== See also ==
- United States presidential elections in Louisiana
