= 1816 United States presidential election in Rhode Island =

- November 20, 1816
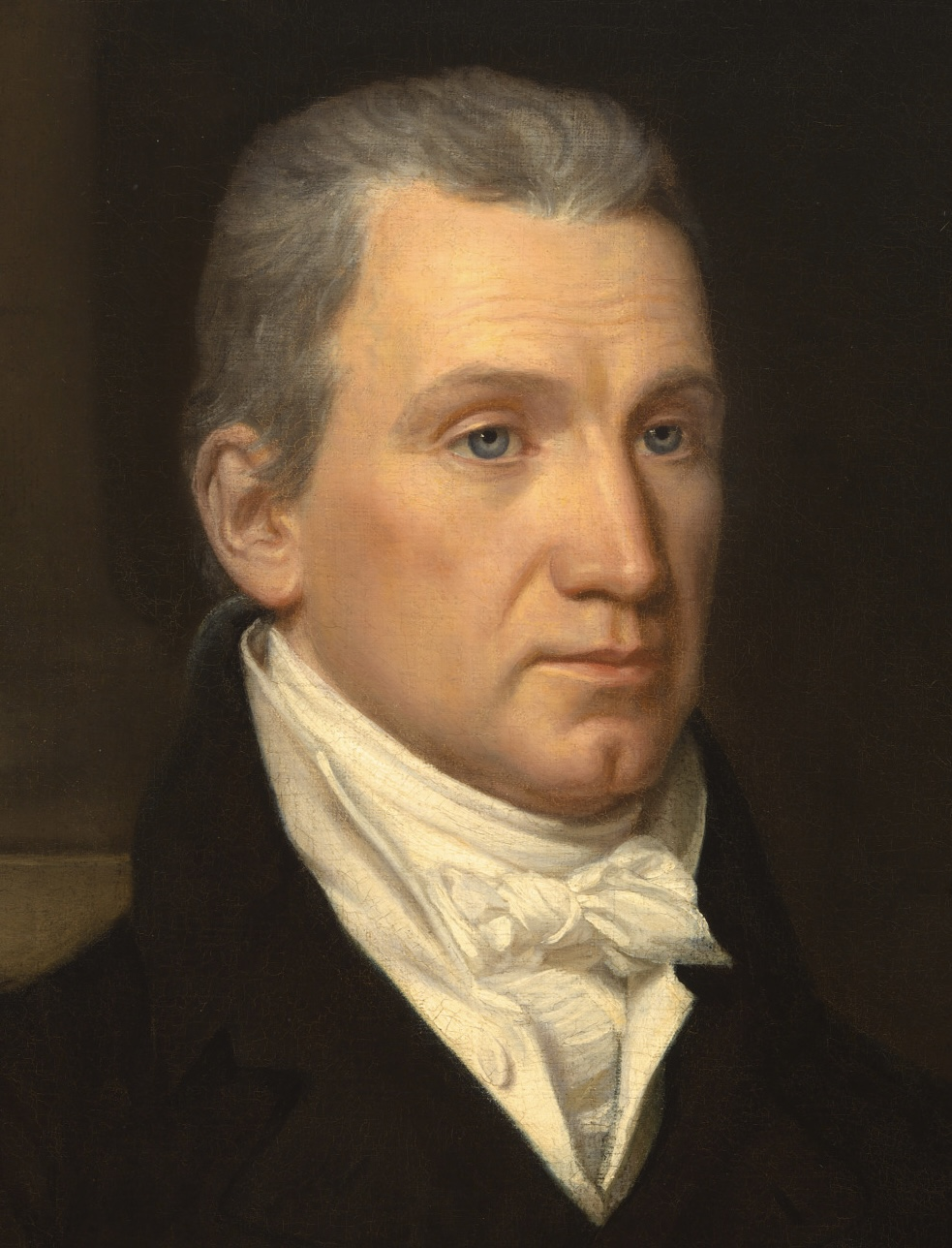
Nominee	James Monroe
Party	Democratic-Republican
Home state	Virginia
Running mate	Daniel D. Tompkins
Electoral vote	4
Popular vote	1,236
Percentage	100.0%

Monroe
>90%
No data
President before election
James Madison
Democratic-Republican
Elected President
James Monroe
Democratic-Republican

A presidential election was held in Rhode Island on November 20, 1816 as part of the 1816 United States presidential election. The Democratic-Republican ticket of U.S. Secretary of State James Monroe and Governor of New York Daniel D. Tompkins was elected unopposed. The Federalist Party failed to nominate a candidate. In the national election, Monroe easily defeated the senior U.S. senator from New York, Rufus King, who received 34 votes from unpledged electors despite not being a candidate.

== General election ==
=== Summary ===
Rhode Island chose four electors on a statewide general ticket. Nineteenth-century election laws required voters to vote directly for members of the Electoral College rather than for president. This sometimes resulted in small differences in the number of votes cast for electors pledged to the same presidential candidate if some voters did not vote for all the electors nominated by a party. This table shows the votes for the most popular elector pledged to the Democratic-Republican ticket to give an approximate sense of the statewide result.

1816 United States presidential election in Rhode Island
Party	Candidate	Votes	%
Democratic-Republican	James Monroe Daniel D. Tompkins	1,236	100.00
Total votes		1,236	100.00

=== Results ===
1816 United States presidential election in Rhode Island
Party	Candidate	Votes
Democratic-Republican	James Fenner	**
Democratic-Republican	Thomas G. Pitman	**
Democratic-Republican	Edward Wilcox	**
Democratic-Republican	Dutee Arnold	**
Total		≈1,236

=== Results by county ===
This table records the result for the most popular Democratic-Republican elector in each county with surviving returns. The totals presented thus differ slightly from the statewide results summary, which records the result for the most popular elector statewide.

County	James Monroe Democratic-Republican		Total
County	Votes	Percent	Total
Bristol	**		**
Kent	**		**
Newport	162	100.00	162
Providence	**		**
Washington	**		**
TOTAL	162	100.00	162

=== Electoral college ===
1816 United States Electoral College vote in Rhode Island
For president				For vice president			
Candidate	Party	Home state	Electoral vote	Candidate	Party	Home state	Electoral vote
James Monroe	Democratic-Republican	Virginia	4	Daniel D. Tompkins	Democratic-Republican	New York	4
Total			4	Total			4

== See also ==
- United States presidential elections in Rhode Island
