= 1816 United States presidential election in New Jersey =

- November 5–6, 1816
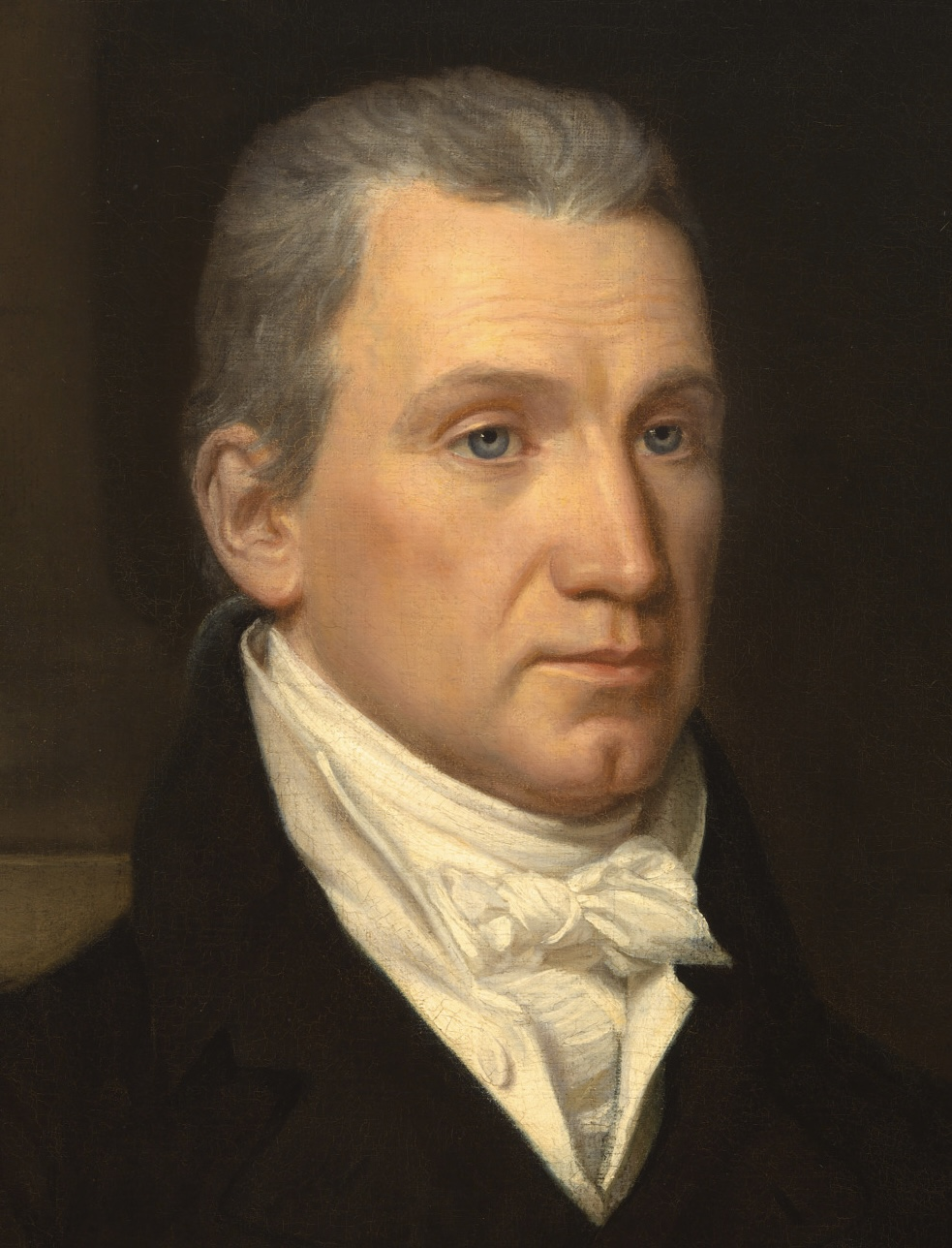

Nominee	James Monroe	Unpledged electors
Party	Democratic-Republican	Federalist
Home state	Virginia	N/A
Running mate	Daniel D. Tompkins	N/A (Note: No candidate formally nominated)
Electoral vote	8	0
Popular vote	5,441	54
Percentage	99.0%	1.0%
County results
Monroe
>90%
No data
President before election
James Madison
Democratic-Republican
Elected President
James Monroe
Democratic-Republican

A presidential election was held in New Jersey on November 5 and 6, 1816 as part of the 1816 United States presidential election. The Democratic-Republican ticket of the U.S. secretary of state James Monroe and the governor of New York Daniel D. Tompkins defeated the Federalist ticket. The Federalist Party failed to nominate a candidate. In the national election, Monroe easily defeated the senior U.S. senator from New York Rufus King, who received 34 votes from unpledged electors despite not being a candidate.

== General election ==
=== Summary ===
New Jersey chose eight electors on a statewide general ticket. Nineteenth century election laws required voters to vote directly for members of the Electoral College rather than for president. This sometimes resulted in small differences in the number of votes cast for electors pledged to the same presidential candidate if some voters did not vote for all the electors nominated by a party. This table compares the votes for the most popular elector pledged to each ticket to give an approximate sense of the statewide result.

1816 United States presidential election in New Hampshire
Party	Candidate	Votes	%
Democratic-Republican	James Monroe Daniel D. Tompkins	5,441	99.02
Federalist	Unpledged electors	54	0.98
Total votes		5,495	100.00

=== Results ===
1816 United States presidential election in New Jersey
Party	Candidate	Votes
Democratic-Republican	Charles Ogden	5,441
Democratic-Republican	John Crowell	5,433
Democratic-Republican	David Welch	5,432
Democratic-Republican	Lewis Moore	5,409
Democratic-Republican	Daniel Garrison	5,408
Democratic-Republican	Aaron Vansycle	5,388
Democratic-Republican	Aaron Kitchell	5,352
Democratic-Republican	William Rossell	5,310
None	Benjamin Ludlow	142
None	John Beatty	64
None	Samuel More	55
None	William Irick	54
Federalist	Frederick Frelinghuysen	54
None	Charles Ewing	50
Federalist	Samuel Bayard	49
None	Ebenezer Elmer	39
None	John N. Simpson	32
None	William W. Harrison	31
None	Charles Kinsey	17
None	Robert Colfax	15
None	John Outwater	13
None	Jonathan Ogden	8
None	Alexander Kirkpatrick	8
None	Anthony Taylor	7
None	Mahlon Ford	7
None	Sylvester D. Russell	6
None	John Buck	1
None	Joseph Cooper	1
None	Morris Hancock	1
None	Andrew Hancock	1
None	Sheppard Kollack	1
None	William Sanford Pennington	1
None	David Thompson	1
Total		≥5,495

=== Results by county ===
This table compares the result for the most popular Democratic-Republican and Federalist electors in each county with surviving returns. The totals presented thus differ slightly from the statewide results summary, which compares the results for the most popular elector pledged to each ticket statewide.

County	James Monroe Democratic-Republican		Unpledged electors Federalist		Margin		Total
County	Votes	Percent	Votes	Percent	Votes	Percent	Total
Bergen	**		**		**		**
Burlington	**		**		**		**
Cape May	**		**		**		**
Cumberland	291	99.66	1	0.34	290	99.32	292
Essex	**		**		**		**
Gloucester	203	92.27	17	7.73	186	84.54	220
Hunterdon	591	95.02	31	4.98	560	90.04	622
Middlesex	**		**		**		**
Monmouth	460	100.00	—		460	100.00	460
Morris	**		**		**		**
Salem	**		**		**		**
Somerset	**		**		**		**
Sussex	773	99.23	6	0.77	767	98.46	779
TOTAL	2,318	97.68	55	2.32	2,263	95.36	2,373

=== Electoral college ===
1816 United States Electoral College vote in New Jersey
For President				For Vice President			
Candidate	Party	Home state	Electoral vote	Candidate	Party	Home state	Electoral vote
James Monroe	Democratic-Republican	Virginia	8	Daniel D. Tompkins	Democratic-Republican	New York	8
Total			8	Total			8

== See also ==
- United States presidential elections in New Jersey
