= 1816 United States presidential election in Massachusetts =

- November 12, 1816
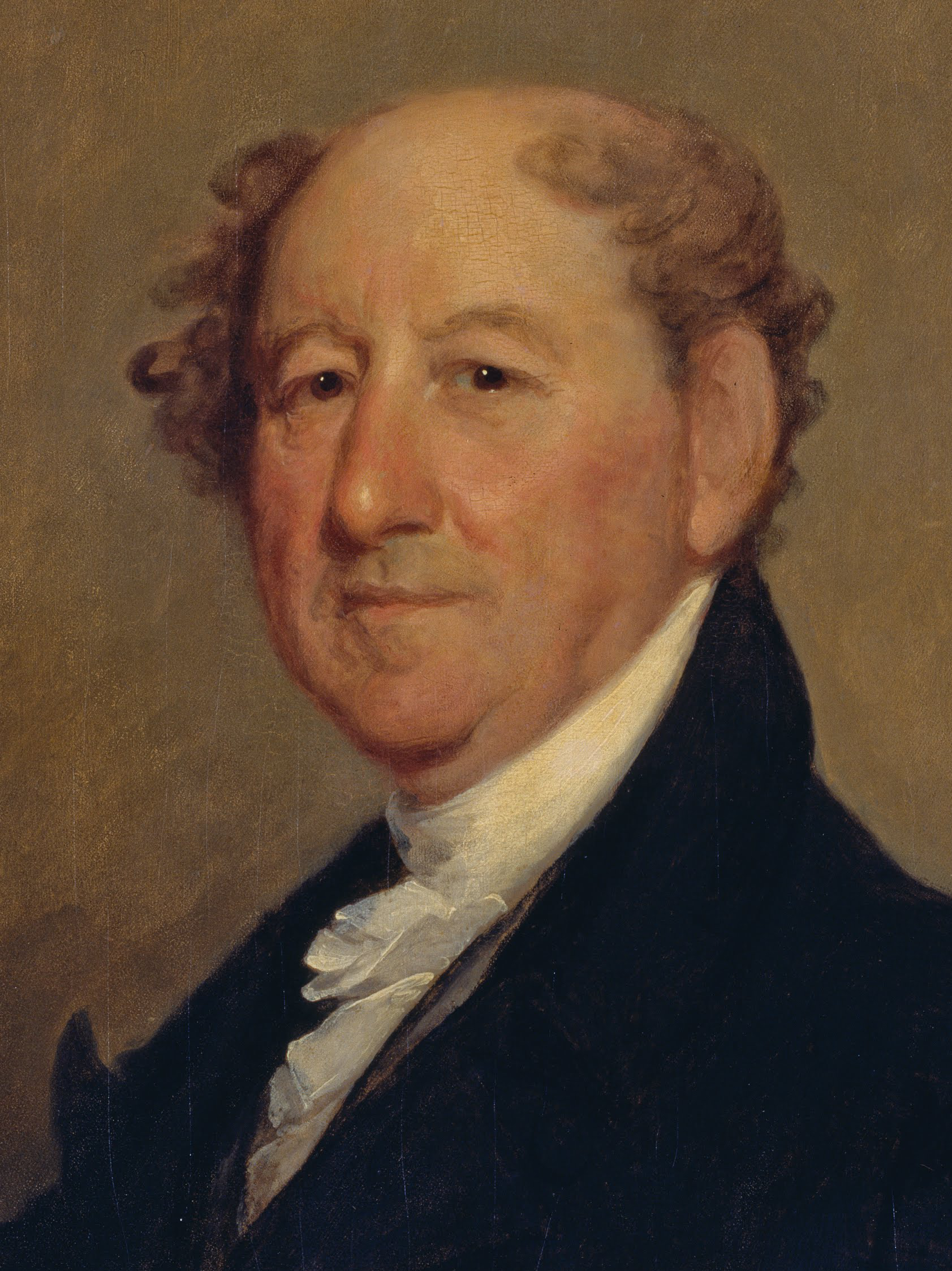
Nominee	Rufus King
Party	Federalist
Home state	New York
Running mate	John E. Howard
Electoral vote	22
Legislative vote	198
Percentage	100.0%
President before election
James Madison
Democratic-Republican
Elected President
James Monroe
Democratic-Republican

A presidential election was held in Massachusetts on November 12, 1816 as part of the 1816 United States presidential election. The senior U.S. senator from New York Rufus King, the de facto candidate of the Federalist Party, received 22 votes from electors chosen by the Massachusetts General Court. Although commonly remembered as the last Federalist presidential candidate, King was not formally selected as the party's nominee and had no designated running mate; the Massachusetts electors voted for the former U.S. senator from Maryland John Eager Howard for vice president. This was the last election in which the District of Maine participated as part of Massachusetts.

== General election ==
=== Results ===
1816 United States presidential election in Massachusetts (Note: Results of balloting in the Massachusetts General Court.)
Party	Candidate	Votes
Federalist	William Abbott	198
Federalist	Peter Bryant	198
Federalist	Luther Carey	198
Federalist	Wendell Davis	198
Federalist	Thomas Dwight	198
Federalist	Christopher Gore	198
Federalist	Joshua Head	198
Federalist	Daniel Howard	198
Federalist	Jonas Kendall	198
Federalist	Joseph Locke	198
Federalist	Stephen Longfellow	198
Federalist	Prentiss Mellen	198
Federalist	Benjamin Pickman Jr.	198
Federalist	Edward Robbins	198
Federalist	Bazaleel Taft Sr.	198
Federalist	Israel Thorndike	198
Federalist	Seth Washburn	198
Federalist	Daniel A. White	198
Federalist	Joseph Woodbridge	198
Federalist	Timothy Boutelle	197
Federalist	John Low	197
Federalist	Samuel Wilde	160
Federalist	Daniel Cony	36
None	Samuel Cony	2
None	William Boutelle	1
Not cast		46
Total		244

=== Electoral college ===
1816 United States Electoral College vote in Massachusetts
For President				For Vice President			
Candidate	Party	Home state	Electoral vote	Candidate	Party	Home state	Electoral vote
Rufus King	Federalist	New York	22	John E. Howard	Federalist	Maryland	22
Total			22	Total			22

== See also ==
- United States presidential elections in Massachusetts
