= 1816 United States presidential election in Ohio =

- November 1, 1816
- Turnout: 5.3% ▼14.4 pp
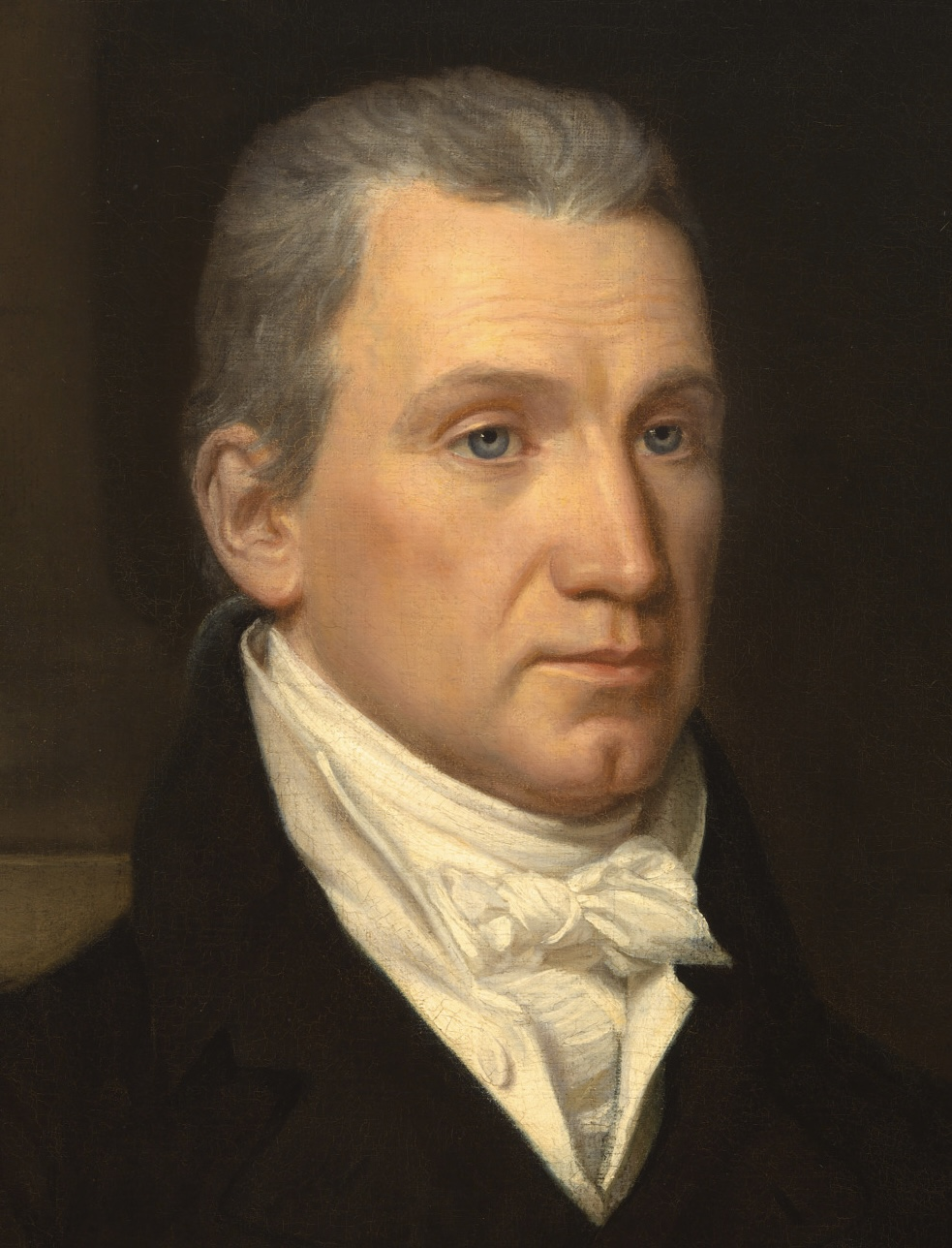

Nominee	James Monroe	Unpledged electors
Party	Democratic-Republican	Federalist
Home state	Virginia	N/A
Running mate	Daniel D. Tompkins	N/A (Note: No candidate formally nominated)
Electoral vote	8	0
Popular vote	3,326	593
Percentage	84.87%	15.13%
President before election
James Madison
Democratic-Republican
Elected President
James Monroe
Democratic-Republican

A presidential election was held in Ohio on November 1, 1816 as part of the 1816 United States presidential election. The Democratic-Republican ticket of the U.S. secretary of state James Monroe and the governor of New York Daniel D. Tompkins defeated the Federalist ticket. The Federalist Party failed to nominate a candidate. In the national election, Monroe easily defeated the senior U.S. senator from New York Rufus King, who received 34 votes from unpledged electors despite not being a candidate.

== General election ==
=== Summary ===
Ohio chose eight electors on a statewide general ticket. Original returns for the election have been lost. Contemporary newspapers state the Democratic-Republican candidates ran unopposed without providing exact figures. Beginning in 1891, the Ohio secretary of state included a table of past election returns in his Annual Report that records 3,326 votes for Monroe and 563 votes for King; these figures have been republished in subsequent editions of Ohio Election Statistics down to the present day. Although the Annual Report is notably imprecise, lacks county data, and omits the names and votes received by electors pledged to each ticket, it remains the most important source for the statewide popular vote in Ohio in 1816. Michael J. Dubin reprints the figures from the Annual Report for 1816 in his comprehensive study of the popular vote in presidential elections prior to 1860. Phil Lampi's A New Nation Votes project locates partial returns from two counties, but no statewide figures. This table follows the scholarly consensus to defer to the figures in Ohio Election Statistics, as corrected in the 1985–86 edition.

1816 United States presidential election in Ohio
Party	Candidate	Votes	%
Democratic-Republican	James Monroe Daniel D. Tompkins	3,326	84.87
Federalist	Unpledged electors	593	15.13
Total votes		3,919	100.00

=== Results ===
1816 United States presidential election in Ohio (Note: Incomplete results based on partial returns from Coshocton, Trumbull, and Warren counties)
Party	Candidate	Votes
Democratic-Republican	Benjamin Hough	53
Democratic-Republican	John Patterson	53
Democratic-Republican	Abraham Shepherd	53
Democratic-Republican	John G. Young	53
Democratic-Republican	Aaron Wheeler	52
Democratic-Republican	William Skinner	50
Democratic-Republican	Othniel Looker	49
Democratic-Republican	Joseph Vance	33
Democratic-Republican	James Curry	20
None	John H. Patch	12
None	Reason Bell	6
None	Jesup N. Couch	6
None	Calvin Pease	6
None	Benjamin Tappan	6
None	Abraham Skinner	5
None	Philemon Beecher	4
None	Bezaleel Wells	4
None	Francis Freeman	3
None	Ethan Allen Brown	1
None	William Patterson	1
None	Thomas Worthington	1
Total		≥53

=== Results by county ===
County	James Monroe Democratic-Republican		Others		Margin		Total	Cit.
County	Votes	Percent	Votes	Percent	Votes	Percent	Total	Cit.
Adams	**		**		**		**	
Ashtabula	**		**		**		**	
Athens	**		**		**		**	
Belmont	**		**		**		**	
Butler	**		**		**		**	
Champaign	**		**		**		**	
Clermont	**		**		**		**	
Clinton	**		**		**		**	
Columbiana	**		**		**		**	
Coshocton	8	100.00	—		8	100.00	8	
Cuyahoga	**		**		**		**	
Delaware	**		**		**		**	
Fairfield	**		**		**		**	
Fayette	**		**		**		**	
Franklin	**		**		**		**	
Gallia	**		**		**		**	
Geauga	**		**		**		**	
Greene	**		**		**		**	
Guernsey	**		**		**		**	
Hamilton	**		**		**		**	
Harrison	**		**		**		**	
Highland	**		**		**		**	
Huron	**		**		**		**	
Jackson	**		**		**		**	
Jefferson	**		**		**		**	
Knox	**		**		**		**	
Licking	**		**		**		**	
Madison	**		**		**		**	
Miami	**		**		**		**	
Monroe	**		**		**		**	
Montgomery	**		**		**		**	
Muskingum	**		**		**		**	
Pickaway	**		**		**		**	
Pike	**		**		**		**	
Portage	**		**		**		**	
Preble	**		**		**		**	
Richland	**		**		**		**	
Ross	**		**		**		**	
Scioto	**		**		**		**	
Stark	**		**		**		**	
Trumbull	12	66.67	6	33.33	6	33.34	18	
Tuscarawas	**		**		**		**	
Warren	33	100.00	—		33	100.00	33	
Washington	**		**		**		**	
Wayne	**		**		**		**	
TOTAL	53	89.83	6	10.17	47	79.66	59	

=== Electoral college ===
1816 United States Electoral College vote in Ohio
For President				For Vice President			
Candidate	Party	Home state	Electoral vote	Candidate	Party	Home state	Electoral vote
James Monroe	Democratic-Republican	Virginia	8	Daniel D. Tompkins	Democratic-Republican	New York	8
Total			8	Total			8

== See also ==
- United States presidential elections in Ohio

== Bibliography ==
- Ratcliffe, Donald J. (Autumn 1987). "Voter Turnout in Early Ohio". Journal of the Early Republic. 7 (3): 223–51. JSTOR 3123782.
