= 1816 United States presidential election in Vermont =

- November 1, 1816
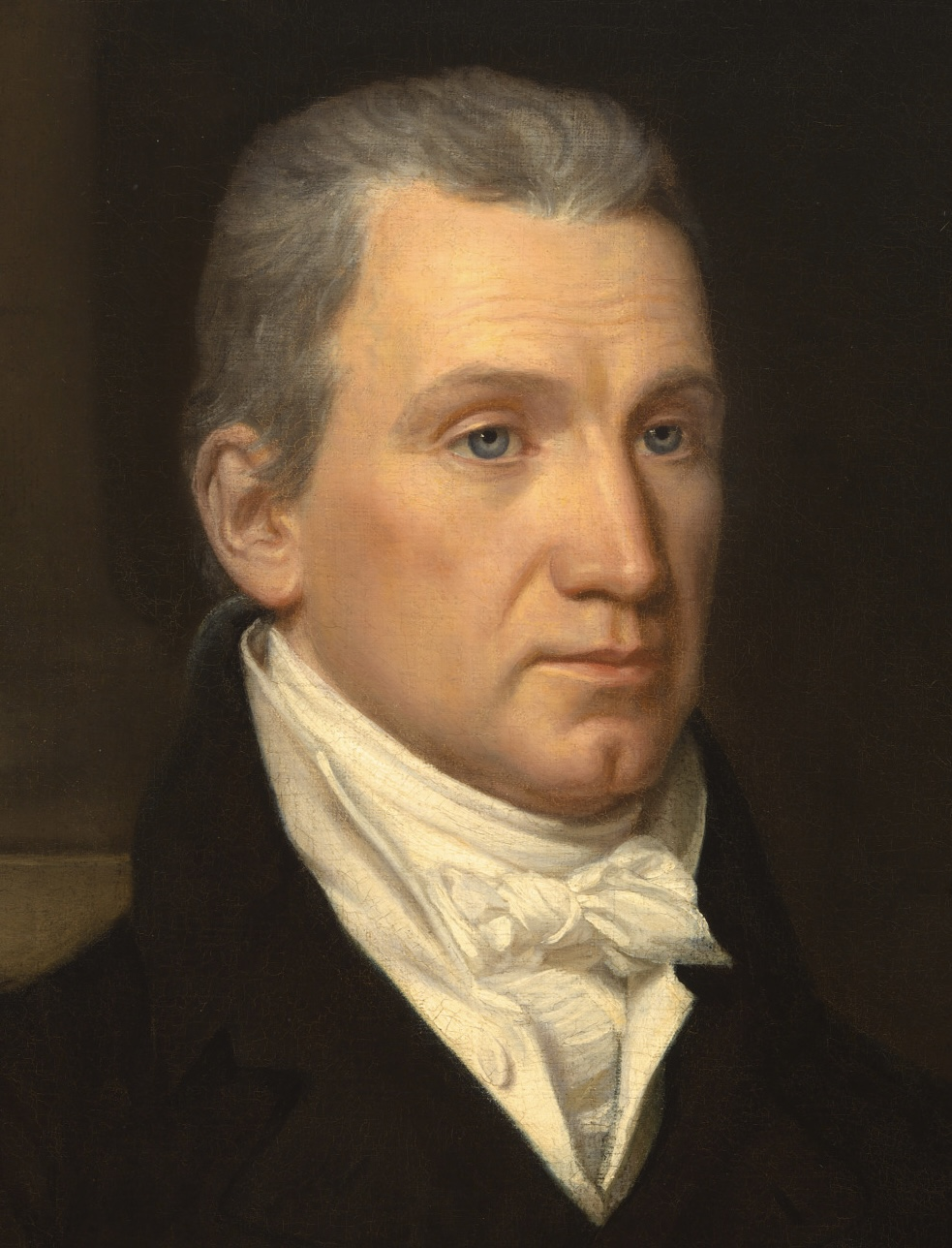
Nominee	James Monroe
Party	Democratic-Republican
Home state	Virginia
Running mate	Daniel D. Tompkins
Electoral vote	8
President before election
James Madison
Democratic-Republican
Elected President
James Monroe
Democratic-Republican

A presidential election was held in Vermont on November 1, 1816 as part of the 1816 United States presidential election. The Democratic-Republican ticket of the U.S. secretary of state James Monroe and the governor of New York Daniel D. Tompkins received 8 votes from electors chosen by the Vermont General Assembly. The Federalist Party failed to nominate a candidate. In the national election, Monroe easily defeated the senior U.S. senator from New York Rufus King, who received 34 votes from unpledged electors despite not being a candidate.

== General election ==
=== Results ===
1816 United States presidential election in Vermont (Note: Results of balloting in the Vermont General Assembly. The number of votes cast for each candidate is unknown.)
Party	Candidate	Votes
Democratic-Republican	Apollas Austin	**
Democratic-Republican	William Brayton	**
Democratic-Republican	John H. Cotton	**
Democratic-Republican	Isaiah Fisk	**
Democratic-Republican	Asaph Fletcher	**
Democratic-Republican	Robert Holly	**
Democratic-Republican	James Roberts	**
Democratic-Republican	Jonathan Robinson	**
Total		**

=== Electoral college ===
1816 United States Electoral College vote in Vermont
For President				For Vice President			
Candidate	Party	Home state	Electoral vote	Candidate	Party	Home state	Electoral vote
James Monroe	Democratic-Republican	Virginia	8	Daniel D. Tompkins	Democratic-Republican	New York	8
Total			8	Total			8

== See also ==
- United States presidential elections in Vermont

== Bibliography ==
- Dubin, Michael J. (2002). United States Presidential Elections, 1788–1860: The Official Results by County and State. Jefferson, NC: McFarland & Co.
- Lampi, Philip J. (January 11, 2012). "1816 President of the United States, Electoral College". A New Nation Votes. American Antiquarian Society.
- National Archives and Records Administration (n.d.). "1816 Electoral College Results". National Archives.
- Turner, Lynn W. (2002). "Elections of 1816 and 1820". In Schlesinger, Arthur M. Jr.; Israel, Fred L. (eds.). History of American Presidential Elections, 1789–2001. Vol. 1. Philadelphia: Chelsea House Publishers. pp. 298–345.
