= 1816 United States presidential election in Georgia =

- November 12, 1816
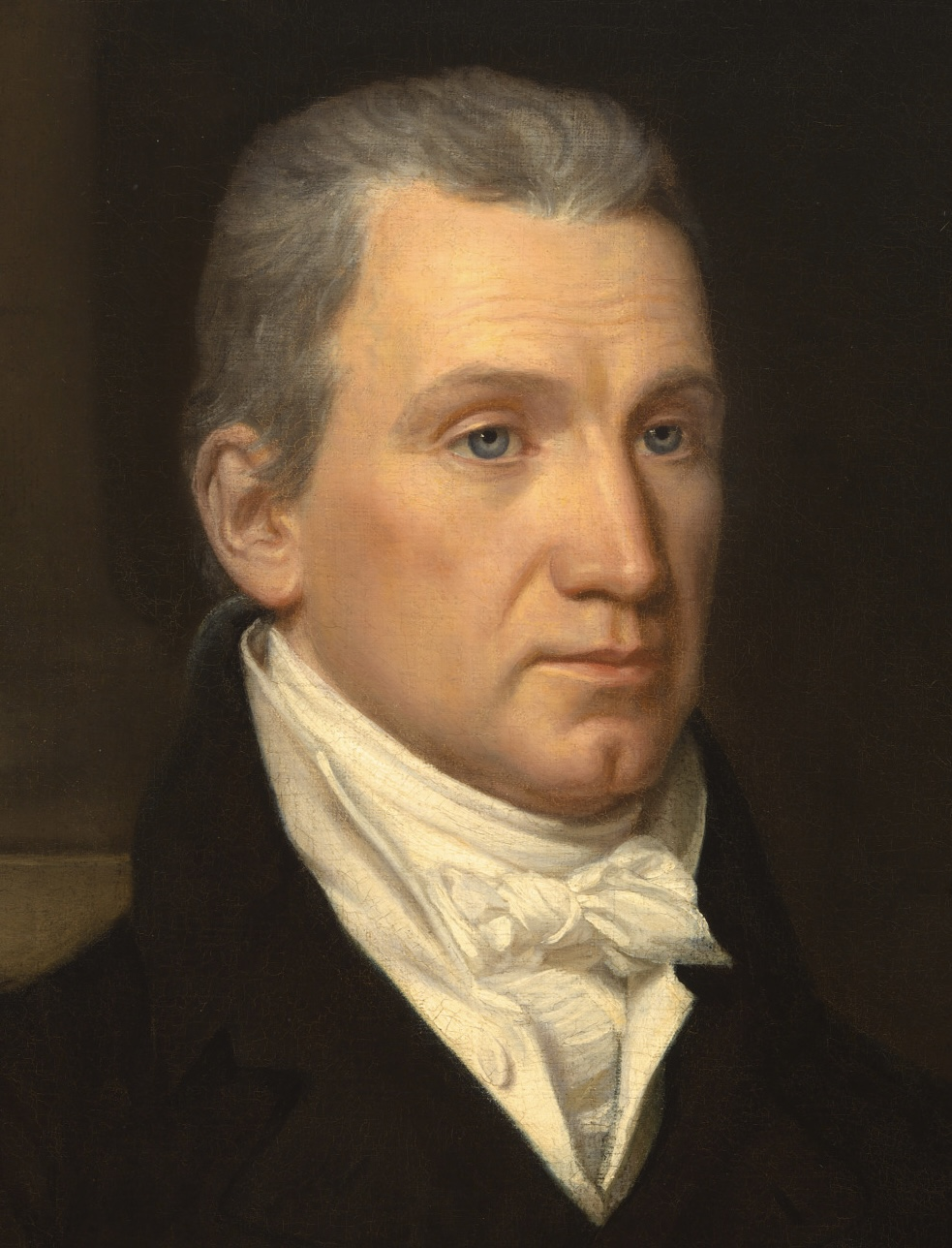
Nominee	James Monroe
Party	Democratic-Republican
Home state	Virginia
Running mate	Daniel D. Tompkins
Electoral vote	8
President before election
James Madison
Democratic-Republican
Elected President
James Monroe
Democratic-Republican

A presidential election was held in Georgia on November 12, 1816, as part of the 1816 United States presidential election. The Democratic-Republican ticket of the U.S. secretary of state James Monroe and the governor of New York Daniel D. Tompkins received eight votes from electors chosen by the Georgia General Assembly. The Federalist Party failed to nominate a candidate. Monroe won the national election handily, defeating the senior U.S. senator from New York Rufus King, who received 34 votes from unpledged electors despite not being a candidate.

== General election ==
=== Results ===
1816 United States presidential election in Georgia (Note: Results of balloting in the Georgia General Assembly. The number of votes cast for each candidate is unknown.)
Party	Candidate	Votes
Democratic-Republican	David Adams	**
Democratic-Republican	John Clark	**
Democratic-Republican	Charles Harris	**
Democratic-Republican	Jared Irwin	**
Democratic-Republican	John McIntosh	**
Democratic-Republican	David Meriwether	**
Democratic-Republican	Henry Mitchell	**
Democratic-Republican	John Rutherford	**
Total		**

=== Electoral college ===
1816 United States Electoral College vote in Georgia
For President				For Vice President			
Candidate	Party	Home state	Electoral vote	Candidate	Party	Home state	Electoral vote
James Monroe	Democratic-Republican	Virginia	8	Daniel D. Tompkins	Democratic-Republican	New York	8
Total			8	Total			8

== See also ==
- United States presidential elections in Georgia
