= 1816 United States presidential election in New York =

- November 8, 1816
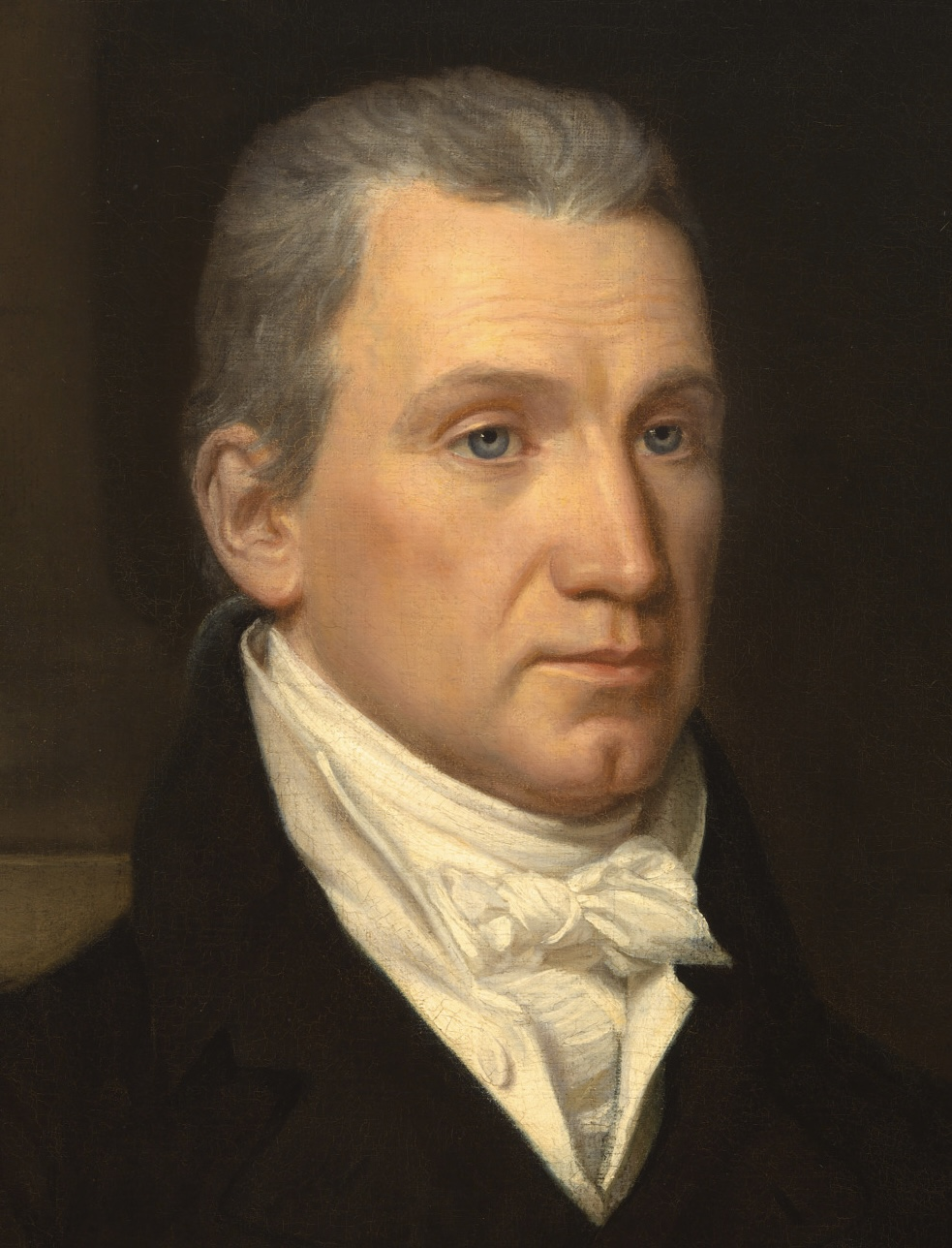

Nominee	James Monroe	Unpledged electors
Party	Democratic-Republican	Federalist
Home state	Virginia	N/A
Running mate	Daniel D. Tompkins	N/A (Note: No candidate formally nominated)
Electoral vote	29	0
Legislative vote	24 (S) · 83 (A)	7 (S) · 35 (A)
Percentage	77.4% (S) · 71.2% (A)	22.6% (S) · 29.7% (A)
President before election
James Madison
Democratic-Republican
Elected President
James Monroe
Democratic-Republican

A presidential election was held in New York on November 8, 1816 as part of the 1816 United States presidential election. The Democratic-Republican ticket of the U.S. secretary of state James Monroe and the governor of New York Daniel D. Tompkins received 29 votes from electors chosen by the New York State Legislature. The Federalist Party failed to nominate a presidential candidate, but unpledged electors received 42 votes from Federalist legislators. Monroe won the national election handily with 183 electoral votes.

The senior U.S. senator from New York Rufus King had been considered a potential challenger to Monroe, but the Federalists abandoned plans for his nomination after King lost the 1816 New York gubernatorial election to Tompkins. Thereafter, King was not considered a presidential candidate and made no attempt to campaign. He received 34 votes notwithstanding from unpledged electors chosen by the legislatures of Connecticut, Delaware, and Massachusetts. The Federalist Party would never again contest a presidential election, earning King the distinction of being remembered as the last Federalist presidential contender.

== General election ==
=== Results ===
1816 United States presidential election in New York (Note: Results of balloting in the New York State Legislature. Members of the Senate and the Assembly voted separately to nominate each of 29 electors, with the concurrence of both houses necessary for a choice.)
Party	Candidate	Legislative election	
Party	Candidate	Senate	Assembly
Democratic-Republican	Artemas Aldrich	24	83
Democratic-Republican	Henry Becker	24	83
Democratic-Republican	John Blake, Jr.	24	83
Democratic-Republican	Lemuel Chipman	24	83
Democratic-Republican	Worthy L. Churchill	24	83
Democratic-Republican	Israel W. Clark	24	83
Democratic-Republican	Jacob Drake	24	83
Democratic-Republican	Charles E. Dudley	24	83
Democratic-Republican	Eliphalet Edmunds	24	83
Democratic-Republican	James Fairlie	24	83
Democratic-Republican	Nichol Fosdick	24	83
Democratic-Republican	Aaron Haring	24	83
Democratic-Republican	Montgomery Hunt	24	83
Democratic-Republican	Samuel Lawrence	24	83
Democratic-Republican	Samuel Lewis	24	83
Democratic-Republican	Alexander MacNish	24	83
Democratic-Republican	Joseph D. Monell	24	83
Democratic-Republican	Gabriel North	24	83
Democratic-Republican	George Petit	24	83
Democratic-Republican	Nathaniel Rochester	24	83
Democratic-Republican	Daniel Root	24	83
Democratic-Republican	John W. Seaman	24	83
Democratic-Republican	Benjamin Smith	24	83
Democratic-Republican	Richard Townley	24	83
Democratic-Republican	Peter S. Van Orden	24	83
Democratic-Republican	Theodorus W. Van Wyck	24	83
Democratic-Republican	Jacob Wertz	24	83
Democratic-Republican	Augustus Wright	24	83
Democratic-Republican	Henry Rutgers	24	82
Federalist	Samuel Bard	7	35
Federalist	Anthony I. Blanchard	7	35
Federalist	Matthew Clarkson	7	35
Federalist	Emanuel Coryell	7	35
Federalist	Ebenezer Foote	7	35
Federalist	Simeon Ford	7	35
Federalist	James Geddes	7	35
Federalist	Jonathan Hasbrouck	7	35
Federalist	Elijah Holt	7	35
Federalist	Samuel M. Hopkins	7	35
Federalist	George Huntington	7	35
Federalist	John Jay	7	35
Federalist	Samuel Jones	7	35
Federalist	Derick Lane	7	35
Federalist	Pliney Moore	7	35
Federalist	Andrew Morris	7	35
Federalist	Jacob Morris	7	35
Federalist	Wilhelmus Mynderse	7	35
Federalist	William North	7	35
Federalist	Gouverneur Ogden	7	35
Federalist	Daniel Paris	7	35
Federalist	Stephen Van Rensselaer	7	35
Federalist	William Wadsworth	7	35
Federalist	Henry Walton	7	35
Federalist	John Wells	7	35
Federalist	George D. Wickham	7	35
Federalist	James Kent	7	34
Federalist	Jonas Platt	7	34
Federalist	William W. Van Ness	7	34
Federalist	John Stearns	—	1
Federalist	Charles Z. Platt	—	1
Federalist	Leffert Lefferts	—	1
Total		31	118

=== Electoral college ===
1816 United States Electoral College vote in New York
For President				For Vice President			
Candidate	Party	Home state	Electoral vote	Candidate	Party	Home state	Electoral vote
James Monroe	Democratic-Republican	Virginia	29	Daniel D. Tompkins	Democratic-Republican	New York	29
Total			29	Total			29

== See also ==
- United States presidential elections in New York
