= 1816 United States presidential election in Delaware =

- November 12, 1816
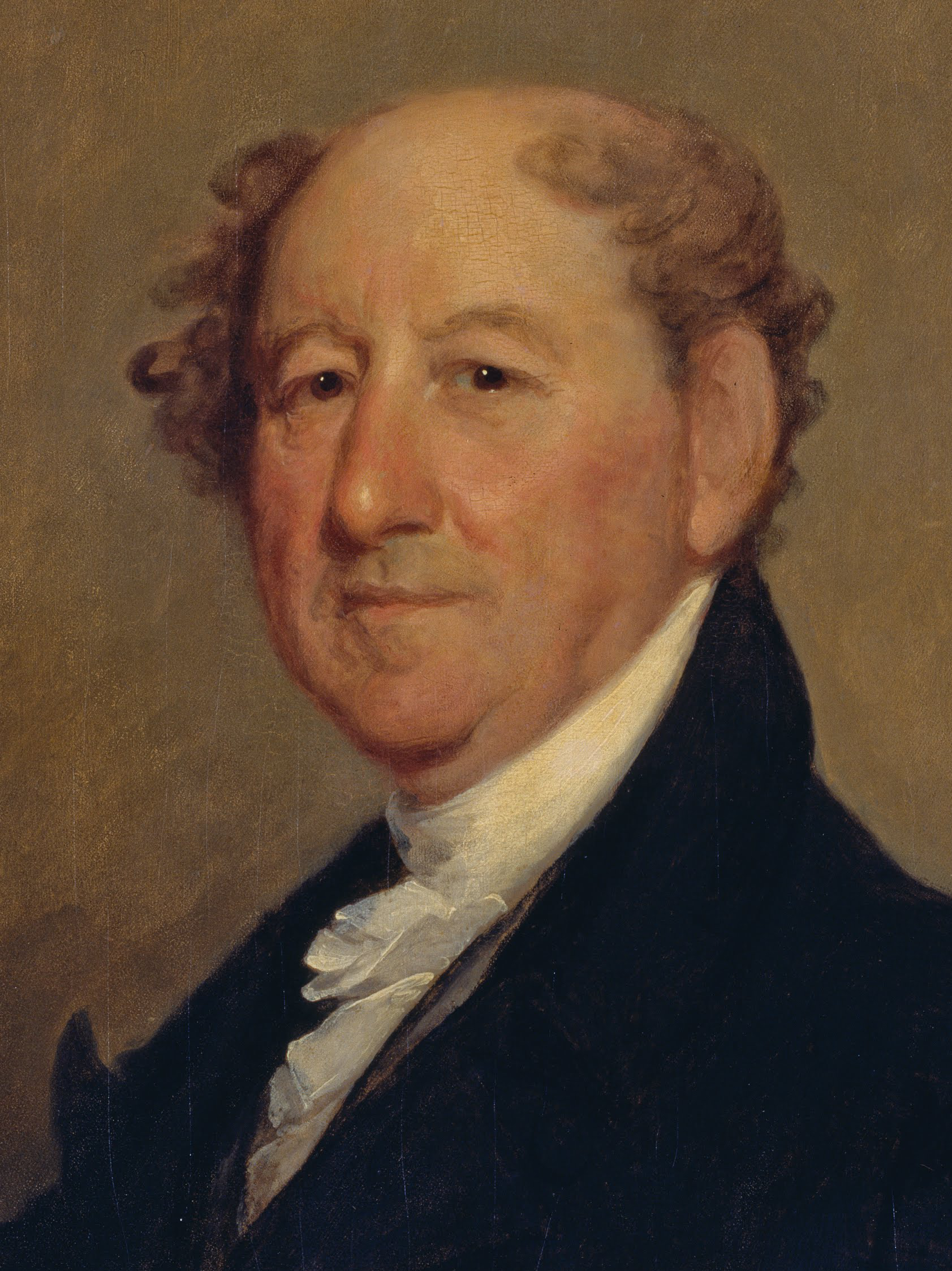

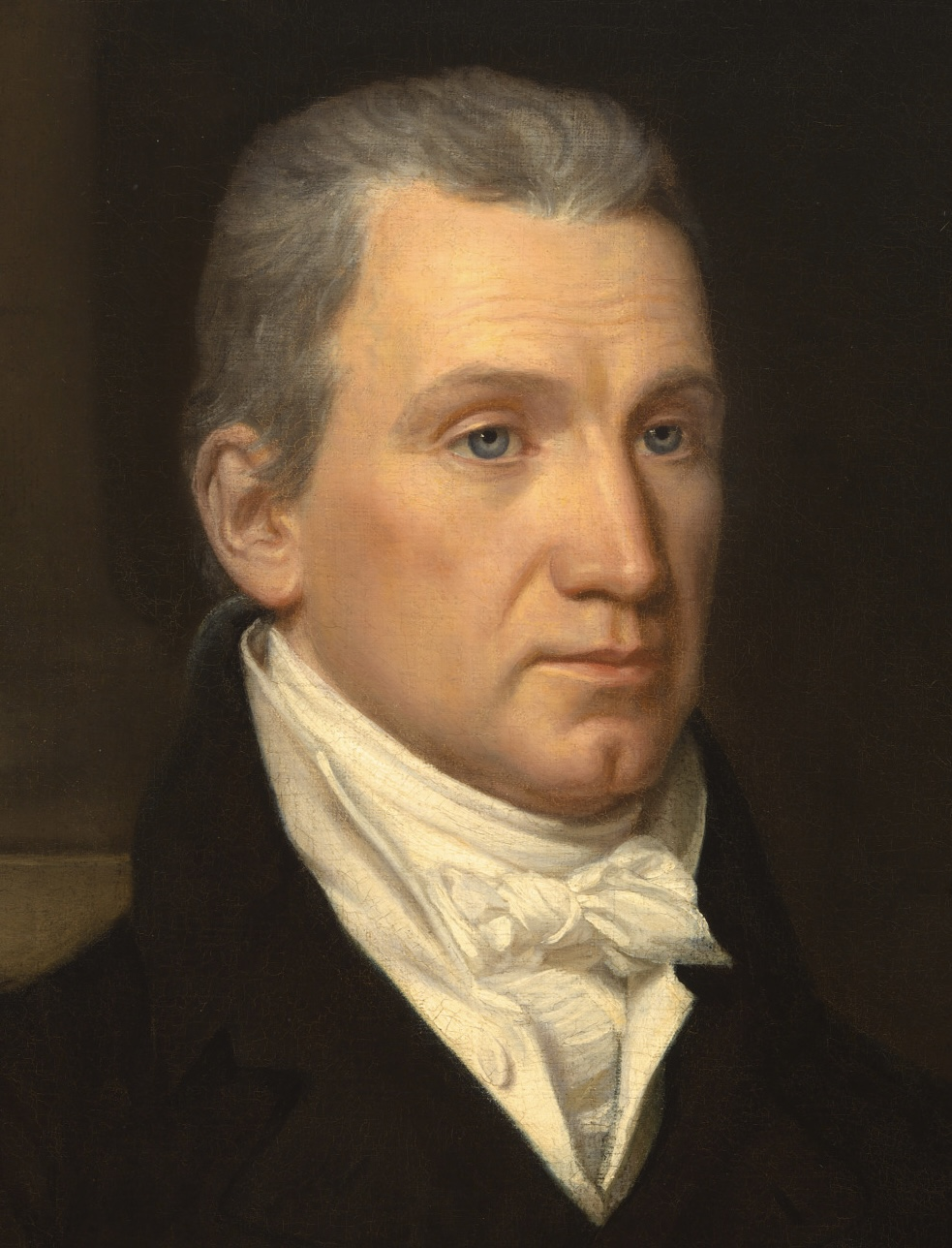
Nominee	Rufus King	James Monroe
Party	Federalist	Democratic-Republican
Home state	New York	Virginia
Running mate	Robert Goodloe Harper	Daniel D. Tompkins
Electoral vote	3 (Note: One elector did not vote.)	0
Legislative vote	18	7
Percentage	72.0%	28.0%
President before election
James Madison
Democratic-Republican
Elected President
James Monroe
Democratic-Republican

A presidential election was held in Delaware on November 12, 1816, as part of the 1816 United States presidential election. The unpledged Federalist electoral candidates were selected by the Delaware General Assembly over the Democratic-Republican candidates, who were pledged to James Monroe. The Federalist Party had failed to nominate a ticket prior to the election. At the meeting of the electoral college, three of the four Delaware electors voted for the senior U.S. senator from New York Rufus King for president and the junior U.S. senator from Maryland Robert Goodloe Harper for vice president, while one elector did not vote.

== General election ==
=== Results ===
1816 United States presidential election in Delaware (Note: Results of balloting in the Delaware General Assembly.)
Party	Candidate	Votes
Federalist	Andrew Barrett	18
Federalist	Thomas Robinson	18
Federalist	Nicholas Ridgely	18
Federalist	Isaac Tunnell	18
Democratic-Republican	Manean Bull	7
Democratic-Republican	Cornelius P. Comegys	7
Democratic-Republican	George Reed	7
Democratic-Republican	Henry M. Ridgely	7
Total		25

=== Electoral college ===
1816 United States Electoral College vote in Delaware
For President				For Vice President			
Candidate	Party	Home state	Electoral vote	Candidate	Party	Home state	Electoral vote
Rufus King	Federalist	New York	3	Robert Goodloe Harper	Federalist	Maryland	3
Not cast			1	Not cast			1
Total			4	Total			4

== See also ==
- United States presidential elections in Delaware
