= Timothy Farrar Jr. =

American politician (1788–1874)

Member of the Massachusetts House of Representatives Suffolk District
- In office 1854–1854

Personal details
- Born: March 17, 1788 New Ipswich, New Hampshire
- Died: October 27, 1874 (aged 86) Boston, Massachusetts
- Education: Phillips Academy; Dartmouth College, 1807

Timothy Farrar Jr. (March 17, 1788 – October 27, 1874) was an American lawyer and politician who served as a judge in New Hampshire and as a member of the Massachusetts House of Representatives.

== Early life ==
Farrar was born on March 17, 1788, in New Ipswich, New Hampshire. Farrar was the son of Chief Justice Timothy Farrar of the New Hampshire Court of Common Pleas.

== Education ==
Farrar graduated from Phillips Academy in Andover, Massachusetts, and from Dartmouth College in 1807. Farrar read law and clerked in the office of Daniel Webster. Farrar was admitted to the New Hampshire bar at Rockingham County, New Hampshire, in 1810.

== Law practice ==
Farrar practiced law in New Ipswich from 1810 until 1813. Farrar entered into a law partnership with Daniel Webster in Portsmouth, New Hampshire, on March 24, 1813. After Webster moved to Boston in 1816, Farrar continued to practice law in Portsmouth. In 1822 Farrar moved to Hanover, New Hampshire, where he practiced law and worked as the secretary, treasurer and librarian of Dartmouth College.

== Family life ==
Farrar married Sarah Adams in 1817.

== Political offices ==
Farrar represented one of Boston's Suffolk County districts in the Massachusetts House of Representatives in 1854.

== Judicial career ==
Farrar was appointed as a judge of the New Hampshire Court of Common Pleas in 1824. Farrar remained a judge until that court was dissolved in 1833.

== Death ==
Farrar died in Boston on October 27, 1874.
