= List of governors of New York =

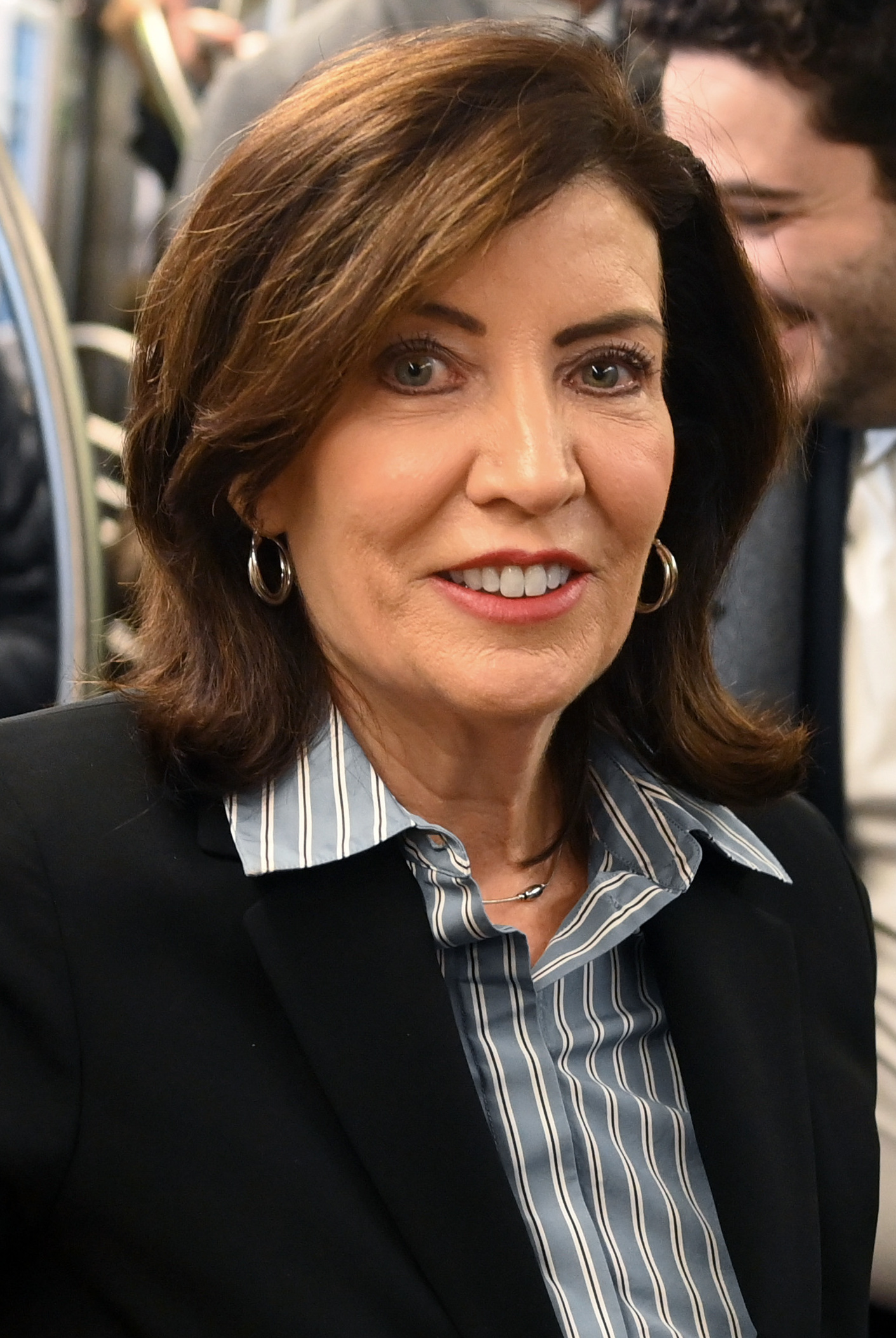
Kathy Hochul has been governor since August 24, 2021. She is the first woman to hold the position.

The governor of New York is the head of government of the U.S. state of New York, the head of the executive branch of New York's state government, and the commander-in-chief of the state's military forces. The officeholder has a duty to enforce state laws, to convene the New York State Legislature, the power to either approve or veto bills passed by the legislature, as well as to grant pardons, except in cases of treason and impeachment.

Fifty-seven people have served as state governor, four of whom served non-consecutive terms (George Clinton, DeWitt Clinton, Horatio Seymour, and Al Smith); the official numbering lists each governor only once. There has only been one female governor so far: Kathy Hochul. This numbering includes one acting governor: the lieutenant governor who filled the vacancy after the resignation of the governor, under the 1777 Constitution. The list does not include the prior colonial governors nor those who have acted as governor when the governor was out of state, such as Lieutenant Governor Timothy L. Woodruff during Theodore Roosevelt's vice presidential campaign in 1900, or Acting Speaker of the New York State Assembly Moses M. Weinstein, who acted as governor for 10 days in 1968 while the governor, the Lieutenant Governor and the Senate Majority Leader were out of the state, attending the Republican National Convention in Miami.

Four men have become president of the United States after serving as governor of New York: Martin Van Buren, Grover Cleveland, Theodore Roosevelt, and Franklin D. Roosevelt, and six were vice president. Van Buren and Theodore Roosevelt held both offices. Numerous Governors have also sought the Presidency, and won their party's respective nomination, but lost the general election, such as Al Smith, Samuel J. Tilden, Horatio Seymour, Thomas E. Dewey, and Charles Evans Hughes. Two governors have been chief justice: John Jay held that position when he was elected governor in 1795, and Charles Evans Hughes became chief justice in 1930, two decades after leaving the governorship.

The longest-serving governor was the first, George Clinton, who first took office on July 30, 1777, and served seven terms in two different periods, totaling just under 21 years in office. As 18 of those years were consecutive, Clinton also served the longest consecutive period in office for a New York governor. Charles Poletti had the shortest term, serving 29 days following the resignation of the previous governor, Herbert H. Lehman in 1942. Lehman was the state's first Jewish governor; David Paterson was the first African American governor of New York, and the first legally blind governor as well. Paterson is only the fourth African American to hold the office of governor in the United States. The current governor is Democrat Kathy Hochul, the state's first female governor, who assumed the office on August 24, 2021, upon the resignation of Andrew Cuomo. Hochul went on to be elected as governor for a full term, after beating Republican Lee Zeldin in the 2022 election.

== Governors ==
New York was one of the original Thirteen Colonies on the east coast of North America, and was admitted as a state on July 26, 1788. Prior to declaring its independence, New York was a colony of the Kingdom of Great Britain, which it in turn obtained from the Dutch as the colony of New Netherland; see the list of colonial governors and the list of directors-general of New Netherland for the pre-statehood period.

The office of the governor was established by the first New York Constitution in 1777. The governor originally served for a term of three years, though the constitution did not specify when the term began. A 1787 law set the start of the term at July 1. The constitutional convention of 1821 reduced the term of office to two years, moved the election to November, and set the beginning and the end of the term to coincide with the calendar year. An 1874 amendment extended the term of office back to three years, but the 1894 constitution again reduced it to two years. An amendment in 1937 extended the term to the current four years. There is no limit to the number of terms a governor may serve.

The Constitution has provided since 1777 for the election of a lieutenant governor of New York, who is ex officio President of the Senate, to the same term (keeping the same term lengths as the governor throughout all the constitutional revisions). Originally, in the event of the death, resignation or impeachment of the governor, the lieutenant governor would become acting governor until the end of the yearly legislative term, the office being filled in a special election, if there was a remainder of the term. Since the 1821 Constitution, the lieutenant governor explicitly becomes governor upon such vacancy in the office and serves for the entire remainder of the term. Should the office of lieutenant governor become vacant, the president pro tempore of the State Senate (Note: The state constitutions refer to this position as the "temporary president of the senate.") performs all the duties of the lieutenant governor until the vacancy is filled either at the next gubernatorial election or by appointment. (Note: On September 22, 2009, the New York Court of Appeals upheld the right of the governor to appoint a lieutenant governor to fill the vacancy.) Likewise, should both offices become vacant at the same time, the president pro tempore acts as governor, with the office of lieutenant governor remaining vacant. Should the presidency pro tempore be vacant too, or the incumbent unable to fulfill the duties, the Speaker of the State Assembly is next in the line of succession. The lieutenant governor is elected on the same ticket as the governor since the 1954 election.

Governors of the State of New York
No.	Governor	Term in office (Note: The 1846 constitution specified that the governor holds their office "until and including the thirty-first day of December;" this has been interpreted in modern times as the changeover occurring at midnight. Governors on this list are only marked as having left office on December 31 if an early or midnight swearing-in of their successor was documented.)	Party	Election	Lt. Governor (Note: Lieutenant governors represented the same party as their governor unless noted.)
1	George Clinton (1739–1812)	July 30, 1777 – July 1, 1795 (6546 days; retired)	No parties (Note: Dubin, Glashan, and Kallenbach note Clinton as having no party identification until either 1789 (Dubin) or 1792 (Glashan and Kallenbach).)	1777	Pierre Van Cortlandt
1	George Clinton (1739–1812)	July 30, 1777 – July 1, 1795 (6546 days; retired)	No parties	1780	Pierre Van Cortlandt
1	George Clinton (1739–1812)	July 30, 1777 – July 1, 1795 (6546 days; retired)	No parties	1783	Pierre Van Cortlandt
1	George Clinton (1739–1812)	July 30, 1777 – July 1, 1795 (6546 days; retired)	No parties	1786	Pierre Van Cortlandt
1	George Clinton (1739–1812)	July 30, 1777 – July 1, 1795 (6546 days; retired)	No parties	1789	Pierre Van Cortlandt
1	George Clinton (1739–1812)	July 30, 1777 – July 1, 1795 (6546 days; retired)	Anti-Federalist	1792	Pierre Van Cortlandt
2	John Jay (1745–1829)	July 1, 1795 – July 1, 1801 (2192 days; retired)	Federalist	1795	Stephen Van Rensselaer
2	John Jay (1745–1829)	July 1, 1795 – July 1, 1801 (2192 days; retired)	Federalist	1798	Stephen Van Rensselaer
1	George Clinton (1739–1812)	July 1, 1801 – July 1, 1804 (1097 days; retired)	Democratic– Republican	1801	Jeremiah Van Rensselaer
3	Morgan Lewis (1754–1844)	July 1, 1804 – July 1, 1807 (1096 days; lost election)	Democratic– Republican (Note: Lewis is labeled a Federalist by Kallenbach, and a Democratic-Republican by Dubin, Glashan, and Sobel & Raimo.)	1804	John Broome (died August 8, 1810)
4	Daniel D. Tompkins (1774–1825)	July 1, 1807 – February 24, 1817 (3527 days; resigned) (Note: Tompkins resigned, having been elected Vice President of the United States.)	Democratic– Republican	1807	John Broome (died August 8, 1810)
4	Daniel D. Tompkins (1774–1825)	July 1, 1807 – February 24, 1817 (3527 days; resigned)	Democratic– Republican	1810	John Broome (died August 8, 1810)
4	Daniel D. Tompkins (1774–1825)	July 1, 1807 – February 24, 1817 (3527 days; resigned)	Democratic– Republican	1810	Vacant
4	Daniel D. Tompkins (1774–1825)	July 1, 1807 – February 24, 1817 (3527 days; resigned)	Democratic– Republican	1810	John Tayler (acting from January 29, 1811) (Note: At the time, the position of president pro-tempore of the Senate was only filled during a vacancy in the office of lieutenant governor, so Tayler was not elected to fill the position until January 29, 1811.)
4	Daniel D. Tompkins (1774–1825)	July 1, 1807 – February 24, 1817 (3527 days; resigned)	Democratic– Republican	1810	DeWitt Clinton (elected May 2, 1811)
4	Daniel D. Tompkins (1774–1825)	July 1, 1807 – February 24, 1817 (3527 days; resigned)	Democratic– Republican	1813	John Tayler
4	Daniel D. Tompkins (1774–1825)	July 1, 1807 – February 24, 1817 (3527 days; resigned)	Democratic– Republican	1816	John Tayler
5	John Tayler (1742–1829)	February 24, 1817 – July 1, 1817 (128 days; retired) (Note: Tayler was instead reelected lieutenant governor.)	Democratic– Republican	Lieutenant governor acting	Philetus Swift (acting)
6	DeWitt Clinton (1769–1828)	July 1, 1817 – January 1, 1823 (2011 days; retired)	Democratic– Republican	1817	John Tayler
6	DeWitt Clinton (1769–1828)	July 1, 1817 – January 1, 1823 (2011 days; retired)	Democratic– Republican	1820	John Tayler
7	Joseph C. Yates (1768–1837)	January 1, 1823 – January 1, 1825 (732 days; retired)	Democratic– Republican	1822	Erastus Root
6	DeWitt Clinton (1769–1828)	January 1, 1825 – February 11, 1828 (1137 days; died in office)	Democratic– Republican	1824	James Tallmadge Jr.
6	DeWitt Clinton (1769–1828)	January 1, 1825 – February 11, 1828 (1137 days; died in office)	Democratic– Republican	1826	Nathaniel Pitcher
8	Nathaniel Pitcher (1777–1836)	February 11, 1828 – January 1, 1829 (326 days; retired)	Democratic– Republican	Succeeded from lieutenant governor	Peter R. Livingston (acting)
8	Nathaniel Pitcher (1777–1836)	February 11, 1828 – January 1, 1829 (326 days; retired)	Democratic– Republican	Succeeded from lieutenant governor	Charles Dayan (acting from October 17, 1828)
9	Martin Van Buren (1782–1862)	January 1, 1829 – March 12, 1829 (71 days; resigned) (Note: Van Buren resigned, having been confirmed as United States Secretary of State.)	Democratic– Republican	1828	Enos T. Throop
10	Enos T. Throop (1784–1874)	March 12, 1829 – January 1, 1833 (1392 days; retired)	Democratic	Succeeded from lieutenant governor	Charles Stebbins (acting)
10	Enos T. Throop (1784–1874)	March 12, 1829 – January 1, 1833 (1392 days; retired)	Democratic	Succeeded from lieutenant governor	William M. Oliver (acting)
10	Enos T. Throop (1784–1874)	March 12, 1829 – January 1, 1833 (1392 days; retired)	Democratic	1830	Edward Philip Livingston
11	William L. Marcy (1786–1857)	January 1, 1833 – January 1, 1839 (2192 days; lost election)	Democratic	1832	John Tracy
11	William L. Marcy (1786–1857)	January 1, 1833 – January 1, 1839 (2192 days; lost election)	Democratic	1834	John Tracy
11	William L. Marcy (1786–1857)	January 1, 1833 – January 1, 1839 (2192 days; lost election)	Democratic	1836	John Tracy
12	William H. Seward (1801–1872)	January 1, 1839 – January 1, 1843 (1462 days; retired)	Whig	1838	Luther Bradish
12	William H. Seward (1801–1872)	January 1, 1839 – January 1, 1843 (1462 days; retired)	Whig	1840	Luther Bradish
13	William C. Bouck (1786–1859)	January 1, 1843 – January 1, 1845 (732 days; lost nomination)	Democratic	1842	Daniel S. Dickinson
14	Silas Wright (1795–1847)	January 1, 1845 – January 1, 1847 (731 days; lost election)	Democratic	1844	Addison Gardiner (Note: Represented the Democratic Party) (resigned July 5, 1847)
15	John Young (1802–1852)	January 1, 1847 – January 1, 1849 (732 days; lost nomination)	Whig	1846	Addison Gardiner (resigned July 5, 1847)
15	John Young (1802–1852)	January 1, 1847 – January 1, 1849 (732 days; lost nomination)	Whig	1846	Albert Lester (acting)
15	John Young (1802–1852)	January 1, 1847 – January 1, 1849 (732 days; lost nomination)	Whig	1846	Hamilton Fish (took office January 1, 1848)
16	Hamilton Fish (1808–1893)	January 1, 1849 – January 1, 1851 (731 days; retired)	Whig	1848	George W. Patterson
17	Washington Hunt (1811–1867)	January 1, 1851 – January 1, 1853 (732 days; lost election)	Whig	1850	Sanford E. Church
18	Horatio Seymour (1810–1886)	January 1, 1853 – January 1, 1855 (731 days; lost election)	Democratic	1852	Sanford E. Church
19	Myron H. Clark (1806–1892)	January 1, 1855 – January 1, 1857 (732 days; retired)	Whig/ Free Soil (fusion) (Note: Clark is widely labeled a Whig or Whig-Free Soil candidate, and Sobel & Raimo note he was nominated by the Whig, Free Democracy, Anti-Nebraska, and Temperance parties.)	1854	Henry Jarvis Raymond
20	John A. King (1788–1867)	January 1, 1857 – January 1, 1859 (731 days; retired)	Republican	1856	Henry R. Selden
21	Edwin D. Morgan (1811–1883)	January 1, 1859 – January 1, 1863 (1462 days; retired)	Republican	1858	Robert Campbell
21	Edwin D. Morgan (1811–1883)	January 1, 1859 – January 1, 1863 (1462 days; retired)	Republican	1860	Robert Campbell
18	Horatio Seymour (1810–1886)	January 1, 1863 – January 2, 1865 (733 days; lost election)	Democratic	1862	David R. Floyd-Jones
22	Reuben Fenton (1819–1885)	January 2, 1865 (Note: All modern sources say Fenton was inaugurated on January 1, and this is found in sources at least as old as 1910; however, all contemporary coverage says he was inaugurated at noon on Monday, January 2.) – January 1, 1869 (1461 days; retired)	Union	1864	Thomas G. Alvord
22	Reuben Fenton (1819–1885)	January 2, 1865 – January 1, 1869 (1461 days; retired)	Union	1866	Stewart L. Woodford
23	John T. Hoffman (1828–1888)	January 1, 1869 – January 1, 1873 (1462 days; retired)	Democratic	1868	Allen C. Beach
23	John T. Hoffman (1828–1888)	January 1, 1869 – January 1, 1873 (1462 days; retired)	Democratic	1870	Allen C. Beach
24	John Adams Dix (1798–1879)	January 1, 1873 – January 1, 1875 (731 days; lost election)	Republican	1872	John C. Robinson
25	Samuel J. Tilden (1814–1886)	January 1, 1875 – January 1, 1877 (732 days; retired) (Note: Tilden instead ran unsuccessfully for President of the United States.)	Democratic	1874	William Dorsheimer
26	Lucius Robinson (1810–1891)	January 1, 1877 – January 1, 1880 (1096 days; lost election)	Democratic	1876	William Dorsheimer
27	Alonzo B. Cornell (1832–1904)	January 1, 1880 – January 1, 1883 (1097 days; lost nomination) (Note: Cornell lost the Republican nomination to Charles J. Folger.)	Republican	1879	George Gilbert Hoskins
28	Grover Cleveland (1837–1908)	January 1, 1883 – January 6, 1885 (737 days; resigned) (Note: Cleveland resigned, having been elected President of the United States.)	Democratic	1882	David B. Hill
29	David B. Hill (1843–1910)	January 6, 1885 – January 1, 1892 (2552 days; retired) (Note: Hill was elected to the United States Senate for a term starting March 4, 1891, but did not take office until his gubernatorial term expired.)	Democratic	Succeeded from lieutenant governor	Dennis McCarthy (Note: Represented the Republican Party) (acting)
29	David B. Hill (1843–1910)	January 6, 1885 – January 1, 1892 (2552 days; retired)	Democratic	1885	Edward F. Jones
29	David B. Hill (1843–1910)	January 6, 1885 – January 1, 1892 (2552 days; retired)	Democratic	1888	Edward F. Jones
30	Roswell P. Flower (1835–1899)	January 1, 1892 – January 1, 1895 (1097 days; retired)	Democratic	1891	William F. Sheehan
31	Levi P. Morton (1824–1920)	January 1, 1895 – January 1, 1897 (732 days; retired)	Republican	1894	Charles T. Saxton
32	Frank S. Black (1853–1913)	January 1, 1897 – December 31, 1898 (730 days; lost nomination)	Republican	1896	Timothy L. Woodruff
33	Theodore Roosevelt (1858–1919)	January 1, 1899 – January 1, 1901 (731 days; retired) (Note: Roosevelt was instead elected Vice President of the United States.)	Republican	1898	Timothy L. Woodruff
34	Benjamin Odell (1854–1926)	January 1, 1901 – December 31, 1904 (1461 days; retired)	Republican	1900	Timothy L. Woodruff
34	Benjamin Odell (1854–1926)	January 1, 1901 – December 31, 1904 (1461 days; retired)	Republican	1902	Frank W. Higgins
35	Frank W. Higgins (1856–1907)	January 1, 1905 – January 1, 1907 (731 days; retired)	Republican	1904	Matthew Linn Bruce (resigned December 5, 1906)
35	Frank W. Higgins (1856–1907)	January 1, 1905 – January 1, 1907 (731 days; retired)	Republican	1904	John Raines (acting)
36	Charles Evans Hughes (1862–1948)	January 1, 1907 – October 6, 1910 (1375 days; resigned) (Note: Hughes resigned, having been confirmed as Associate Justice of the Supreme Court of the United States.)	Republican	1906	Lewis Stuyvesant Chanler
36	Charles Evans Hughes (1862–1948)	January 1, 1907 – October 6, 1910 (1375 days; resigned)	Republican	1908	Horace White
37	Horace White (1865–1943)	October 6, 1910 – December 31, 1910 (87 days; retired)	Republican	Succeeded from lieutenant governor	George H. Cobb (acting)
38	John Alden Dix (1860–1928)	January 1, 1911 – January 1, 1913 (732 days; lost nomination)	Democratic	1910	Thomas F. Conway
39	William Sulzer (1863–1941)	January 1, 1913 – October 17, 1913 (290 days; impeached and removed) (Note: Sulzer was impeached and removed from office for campaign contribution fraud.)	Democratic	1912	Martin H. Glynn
40	Martin H. Glynn (1871–1924)	October 17, 1913 – December 31, 1914 (441 days; lost election)	Democratic	Succeeded from lieutenant governor	Robert F. Wagner (acting)
41	Charles Seymour Whitman (1868–1947)	January 1, 1915 – January 1, 1919 (1462 days; lost election)	Republican	1914	Edward Schoeneck
41	Charles Seymour Whitman (1868–1947)	January 1, 1915 – January 1, 1919 (1462 days; lost election)	Republican	1916	Edward Schoeneck
42	Al Smith (1873–1944)	January 1, 1919 – December 31, 1920 (731 days; lost election)	Democratic	1918	Harry C. Walker
43	Nathan L. Miller (1868–1953)	January 1, 1921 – December 31, 1922 (730 days; lost election)	Republican	1920	Jeremiah Wood (resigned September 26, 1922)
43	Nathan L. Miller (1868–1953)	January 1, 1921 – December 31, 1922 (730 days; lost election)	Republican	1920	Clayton R. Lusk (acting)
42	Al Smith (1873–1944)	January 1, 1923 – December 31, 1928 (2192 days; retired) (Note: Smith instead ran unsuccessfully for President of the United States.)	Democratic	1922	George R. Lunn
42	Al Smith (1873–1944)	January 1, 1923 – December 31, 1928 (2192 days; retired)	Democratic	1924	Seymour Lowman
42	Al Smith (1873–1944)	January 1, 1923 – December 31, 1928 (2192 days; retired)	Democratic	1926	Edwin Corning
44	Franklin D. Roosevelt (1882–1945)	January 1, 1929 – December 31, 1932 (1461 days; retired) (Note: Roosevelt was instead elected President of the United States.)	Democratic	1928	Herbert H. Lehman
44	Franklin D. Roosevelt (1882–1945)	January 1, 1929 – December 31, 1932 (1461 days; retired)	Democratic	1930	Herbert H. Lehman
45	Herbert H. Lehman (1878–1963)	January 1, 1933 – December 2, 1942 (3623 days; resigned) (Note: Lehman resigned, having been appointed director of the Office of Foreign Relief and Rehabilitation Operations at the United States Department of State.)	Democratic	1932	M. William Bray
45	Herbert H. Lehman (1878–1963)	January 1, 1933 – December 2, 1942 (3623 days; resigned)	Democratic	1934	M. William Bray
45	Herbert H. Lehman (1878–1963)	January 1, 1933 – December 2, 1942 (3623 days; resigned)	Democratic	1936	M. William Bray
45	Herbert H. Lehman (1878–1963)	January 1, 1933 – December 2, 1942 (3623 days; resigned)	Democratic	1938	Charles Poletti
46	Charles Poletti (1903–2002)	December 2, 1942 – December 31, 1942 (30 days; retired)	Democratic	Succeeded from lieutenant governor	Joe R. Hanley (acting)
47	Thomas E. Dewey (1902–1971)	January 1, 1943 – December 31, 1954 (4383 days; retired)	Republican	1942	Thomas W. Wallace
47	Thomas E. Dewey (1902–1971)	January 1, 1943 – December 31, 1954 (4383 days; retired)	Republican	1946	Joe R. Hanley
47	Thomas E. Dewey (1902–1971)	January 1, 1943 – December 31, 1954 (4383 days; retired)	Republican	1950	Frank C. Moore (resigned September 30, 1953)
47	Thomas E. Dewey (1902–1971)	January 1, 1943 – December 31, 1954 (4383 days; retired)	Republican	1950	Arthur H. Wicks (acting)
47	Thomas E. Dewey (1902–1971)	January 1, 1943 – December 31, 1954 (4383 days; retired)	Republican	1950	Walter J. Mahoney (acting)
48	W. Averell Harriman (1891–1986)	January 1, 1955 – December 31, 1958 (1461 days; lost election)	Democratic	1954	George DeLuca
49	Nelson Rockefeller (1908–1979)	January 1, 1959 – December 18, 1973 (5466 days; resigned) (Note: Rockefeller resigned to devote himself to his Commission on Critical Choices for Americans.)	Republican	1958	Malcolm Wilson
49	Nelson Rockefeller (1908–1979)	January 1, 1959 – December 18, 1973 (5466 days; resigned)	Republican	1962	Malcolm Wilson
49	Nelson Rockefeller (1908–1979)	January 1, 1959 – December 18, 1973 (5466 days; resigned)	Republican	1966	Malcolm Wilson
49	Nelson Rockefeller (1908–1979)	January 1, 1959 – December 18, 1973 (5466 days; resigned)	Republican	1970	Malcolm Wilson
50	Malcolm Wilson (1914–2000)	December 18, 1973 – December 31, 1974 (379 days; lost election)	Republican	Succeeded from lieutenant governor	Warren M. Anderson (acting)
51	Hugh Carey (1919–2011)	January 1, 1975 – December 31, 1982 (2922 days; retired)	Democratic	1974	Mary Anne Krupsak
51	Hugh Carey (1919–2011)	January 1, 1975 – December 31, 1982 (2922 days; retired)	Democratic	1978	Mario Cuomo
52	Mario Cuomo (1932–2015)	January 1, 1983 – December 31, 1994 (4383 days; lost election)	Democratic	1982	Alfred DelBello (resigned February 1, 1985)
52	Mario Cuomo (1932–2015)	January 1, 1983 – December 31, 1994 (4383 days; lost election)	Democratic	1982	Warren M. Anderson (acting)
52	Mario Cuomo (1932–2015)	January 1, 1983 – December 31, 1994 (4383 days; lost election)	Democratic	1986	Stan Lundine
52	Mario Cuomo (1932–2015)	January 1, 1983 – December 31, 1994 (4383 days; lost election)	Democratic	1990	Stan Lundine
53	George Pataki (b. 1945)	January 1, 1995 – December 31, 2006 (4383 days; retired)	Republican	1994	Betsy McCaughey (Note: Elected as Betsy McCaughey, but married and changed name in 1995.)
53	George Pataki (b. 1945)	January 1, 1995 – December 31, 2006 (4383 days; retired)	Republican	1998	Mary Donohue
53	George Pataki (b. 1945)	January 1, 1995 – December 31, 2006 (4383 days; retired)	Republican	2002	Mary Donohue
54	Eliot Spitzer (b. 1959)	January 1, 2007 – March 17, 2008 (442 days; resigned) (Note: Spitzer resigned due to a prostitution scandal.)	Democratic	2006	David Paterson
55	David Paterson (b. 1954)	March 17, 2008 – December 31, 2010 (1020 days; retired)	Democratic	Succeeded from lieutenant governor	Joseph Bruno (acting)
55	David Paterson (b. 1954)	March 17, 2008 – December 31, 2010 (1020 days; retired)	Democratic	Succeeded from lieutenant governor	Dean Skelos (acting)
55	David Paterson (b. 1954)	March 17, 2008 – December 31, 2010 (1020 days; retired)	Democratic	Succeeded from lieutenant governor	Malcolm Smith (acting)
55	David Paterson (b. 1954)	March 17, 2008 – December 31, 2010 (1020 days; retired)	Democratic	Succeeded from lieutenant governor	Pedro Espada Jr. (acting) (Note: Espada was a Democrat, but combined with the Republicans in a change of leadership which triggered the 2009 New York State Senate leadership crisis.)
55	David Paterson (b. 1954)	March 17, 2008 – December 31, 2010 (1020 days; retired)	Democratic	Succeeded from lieutenant governor	Richard Ravitch (contested) (Note: Ravitch was appointed on July 8, 2009, but the appointment was contested in the courts. On August 20, the Appellate Division rejected the appointment; Ravitch vacated the office.)
55	David Paterson (b. 1954)	March 17, 2008 – December 31, 2010 (1020 days; retired)	Democratic	Succeeded from lieutenant governor	Malcolm Smith (acting) (Note: Smith succeeded Espada on July 9 as temporary President of the New York State Senate and claimed to be Acting Lieutenant Governor under the provisions of the New York State Constitution while the appointment of Ravitch was contested.)
55	David Paterson (b. 1954)	March 17, 2008 – December 31, 2010 (1020 days; retired)	Democratic	Succeeded from lieutenant governor	Richard Ravitch (Note: On September 22, the New York Court of Appeals reversed the Appellate Division's ruling, thus re-instating Ravitch to the lieutenant governorship, beginning on July 8.)
56	Andrew Cuomo (b. 1957)	January 1, 2011 – August 23, 2021 (3888 days; resigned) (Note: Cuomo resigned due to allegations of sexual harassment.)	Democratic	2010	Robert Duffy
56	Andrew Cuomo (b. 1957)	January 1, 2011 – August 23, 2021 (3888 days; resigned)	Democratic	2014	Kathy Hochul
56	Andrew Cuomo (b. 1957)	January 1, 2011 – August 23, 2021 (3888 days; resigned)	Democratic	2018	Kathy Hochul
57	Kathy Hochul (b. 1958)	August 24, 2021 – Incumbent (Note: Hochul's first full term began at midnight on January 1, 2023, and will expire at midnight on January 1, 2027; she was elected to a second term on November 3, 2026.) (in office 1917 days)	Democratic	Succeeded from lieutenant governor	Andrea Stewart-Cousins (acting)
57	Kathy Hochul (b. 1958)	August 24, 2021 – Incumbent (in office 1917 days)	Democratic	Succeeded from lieutenant governor	Brian Benjamin (appointed September 9, 2021) (resigned April 12, 2022) (Note: Benjamin resigned after having been indicted earlier that day on federal wire fraud and bribery charges.)
57	Kathy Hochul (b. 1958)	August 24, 2021 – Incumbent (in office 1917 days)	Democratic	Succeeded from lieutenant governor	Andrea Stewart-Cousins (acting)
57	Kathy Hochul (b. 1958)	August 24, 2021 – Incumbent (in office 1917 days)	Democratic	Succeeded from lieutenant governor	Antonio Delgado (appointed May 25, 2022)
57	Kathy Hochul (b. 1958)	August 24, 2021 – Incumbent (in office 1917 days)	Democratic	2022	Antonio Delgado (appointed May 25, 2022)
57	Kathy Hochul (b. 1958)	August 24, 2021 – Incumbent (in office 1917 days)	Democratic	2026	Adrienne Adams

== See also ==
- Gubernatorial lines of succession in the United States § New York
- List of governors of New York by time in office
- New York gubernatorial elections
- First ladies and gentlemen of New York
- List of lieutenant governors of New York
- List of colonial governors of New York
- List of New York State legislatures

== Sources ==
- "Former New York Governors". National Governors Association.
- "Governors of New York". State of New York. Archived from the original on March 15, 2008.
- "New York Constitution". State Democracy Research Initiative. University of Wisconsin Law School.
- Dubin, Michael J. (2003). United States Gubernatorial Elections, 1776–1860: The Official Results by State and County. McFarland. ISBN 0-7864-1439-1 – via Internet Archive.
- Glashan, Roy R. (1979). American Governors and Gubernatorial Elections, 1775-1978. Meckler Books. ISBN 0-7201-1511-6 – via Internet Archive.
- Kallenbach, Joseph E.; Kallenbach, Jessamine S. (1977). American State Governors, 1776-1976. Oceana Publications. ISBN 978-0-379-00665-0 – via Internet Archive.
- Mullaney, Marie Marmo (1994). Biographical Directory of the Governors of the United States, 1988–1994. Greenwood Publishing Group. ISBN 0-313-28312-5 – via Internet Archive.
- Sobel, Robert; Raimo, John (1978). Biographical Directory of the Governors of the United States, 1789-1978. Vol. 3. Meckler Books. ISBN 0-930466-01-2 – via Internet Archive.
- Thorpe, Francis Newton, ed. (1909). The Federal and State Constitutions, Colonial Charters, and Other Organic Laws of the States, Territories, and Colonies Now or Heretofore Forming the United States of America. Vol. 5. United States Government Publishing Office – via Internet Archive.
