= 1810 United States gubernatorial elections =

- March 13, 1810 – December 8, 1810

13 state governorships
	Majority party	Minority party
Party	Democratic-Republican	Federalist
Last election	13 governorships	4 governorships
Seats before	13	4
Seats won	12	1
Seats after	16	1
Seat change	▲3	▼3
Seats up	9	4
- Results: Dem-Republican hold Dem-Republican gain Federalist hold

United States gubernatorial elections were held in 1810, in 13 states, concurrent with the House and Senate elections.

Eight governors were elected by popular vote and five were elected by state legislatures.

== Results ==
State	Election date	Incumbent	Party	Status	Opposing candidates
Connecticut	9 April 1810 (Note: Glashan records this election as taking place on 12 April.)	John Treadwell (acting)	Federalist	Re-elected after legislative election, 10,265 (49.50%) (Note: Since no candidate received a majority of the vote, the state legislature decided the election.)	Asa Spalding (Democratic-Republican), 7,185 (34.65%); Roger Griswold (Federalist), 3,110 (15.00%); Scattering 177 (0.85%) (Legislative election) (held, 11 May 1810); John Treadwell, 121 votes Asa Spalding, 42 votes Roger Griswold, 29 votes
Delaware	2 October 1810	George Truitt	Federalist	Term-limited, Democratic-Republican victory	Joseph Haslet (Democratic-Republican) 3,664 (50.49%); Daniel Rodney (Federalist), 3,593 (49.51%)
Maryland (election by legislature)	19 November 1810	Edward Lloyd	Democratic-Republican	Re-elected, 55 votes	John Eager Howard (Federalist), 3 votes Levin Winder (Federalist), 3 votes Charles Carroll of Carrollton (Federalist), 1 vote
Massachusetts	5 April 1810	Christopher Gore	Federalist	Defeated, 44,079 (48.54%)	Elbridge Gerry (Democratic-Republican), 46,541 (51.25%); Scattering 193 (0.21%)
New Hampshire	13 March 1810	Jeremiah Smith	Federalist	Defeated, 15,166 (48.03%)	John Langdon (Democratic-Republican), 16,325 (51.70%); Scattering 84 (0.27%)
New Jersey (election by legislature)	26 October 1810	Joseph Bloomfield	Democratic-Republican	Re-elected, unopposed	William Sanford Pennington (Democratic-Republican), withdrew William Rossell (Democratic-Republican), withdrew
New York	24–26 April 1810 (Note: Glashan records this election as taking place on 23–25 April.)	Daniel D. Tompkins	Democratic-Republican	Re-elected, 43,094 (54.09%)	Jonas Platt (Federalist), (Note: Congressional Quarterly and Kallenbach and Kallenbach describe Platt as an Anti-Clintonian.) 36,484 (45.80%); Scattering 86 (0.11%)
North Carolina (election by legislature)	1 December 1810	David Stone	Democratic-Republican	Defeated, Democratic-Republican victory	(Fourth ballot); Benjamin Smith (Democratic-Republican), 97 votes David Stone (Democratic-Republican), 84 votes Blank, 6 votes
Ohio	9 October 1810	Samuel Huntington	Democratic-Republican	Retired, Democratic-Republican victory	Return J. Meigs Jr. (Democratic-Republican), (Note: Meigs had the support of the Federalist Party.) 9,924 (56.21%) (Note: A New Nation Votes records that the official certified vote was Meigs 9,596, Worthington 7,702, but no other source agrees with this.); Thomas Worthington (Democratic-Republican), 7,731 (43.79%)
Rhode Island	18 April 1810	James Fenner	Democratic-Republican	Re-elected. Returns lost.	
South Carolina (election by legislature)	8 December 1810	John Drayton	Democratic-Republican	Term-limited, Democratic-Republican victory	Henry Middleton (Democratic-Republican), 102 votes Joseph Alston (Democratic-Republican), 53 votes
Vermont	4 September 1810	Jonas Galusha	Democratic-Republican	Re-elected, 13,810 (57.33%)	Isaac Tichenor (Federalist), 9,918 (41.17%) (Note: Some sources give Tichenor's total as 9,912.); Scattering 361 (1.50%)
Virginia (election by legislature)	7 December 1810	John Tyler Sr.	Democratic-Republican	Re-elected, without opposition	

== See also ==
- 1810 United States elections

== Bibliography ==
- Glashan, Roy R. (1979). American Governors and Gubernatorial Elections, 1775-1978. Westport, CT: Meckler Books. ISBN 0-930466-17-9.
- Gubernatorial Elections, 1787-1997. Washington, D.C.: Congressional Quarterly Inc. 1998. ISBN 1-56802-396-0.
- Dubin, Michael J. (2003). United States Gubernatorial Elections, 1776-1860: The Official Results by State and County. Jefferson, North Carolina: McFarland. ISBN 978-0-7864-1439-0.
- Kallenbach, Joseph E.; Kallenbach, Jessamine S., eds. (1977). American State Governors, 1776-1976. Vol. I. Dobbs Ferry, N.Y.: Oceana Publications, Inc. ISBN 0-379-00665-0.
