= Fort Tompkins =

Fort Tompkins may refer to any of several War of 1812 forts named for Governor Daniel D. Tompkins of New York State:

- Fort Tompkins (Sackets Harbor, New York)
- Fort Tompkins (Buffalo, New York)
- Fort Tompkins (Plattsburgh, New York)
- Fort Tompkins (Staten Island), New York City (rebuilt 1847–61)
