= List of governors of New York by time in office =

Governors of New York

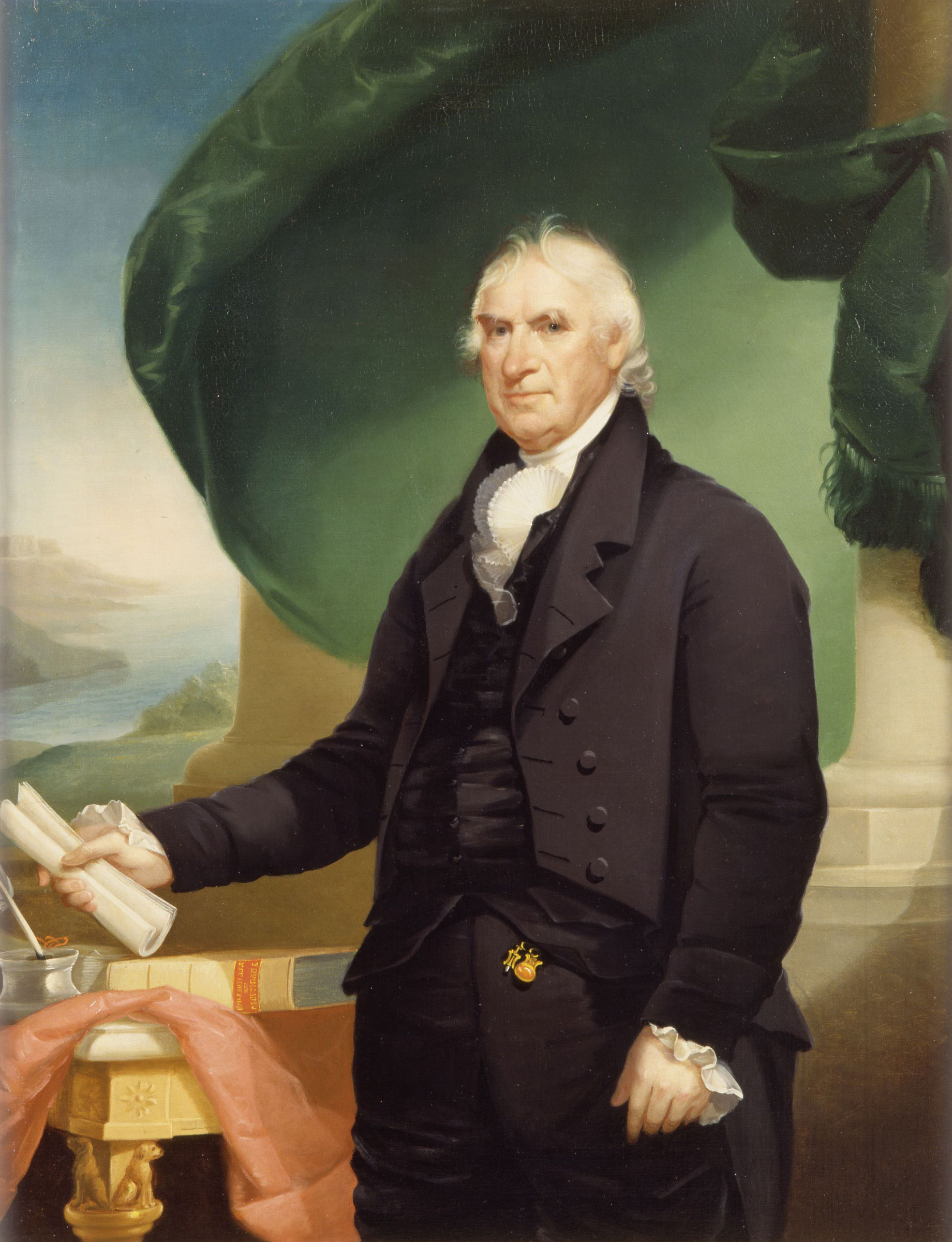
George Clinton, the longest-serving governor of New York

This article is a list of governors of New York by time in office.

In New York, the governor is elected to a four-year term, which is 1,461 days long. There is no term limit. Prior to 1938, governors were elected to a two-year term, which is 730 or 731 days long.

The longest-serving governor of New York is the first officeholder: George Clinton. The shortest-serving is Charles Poletti, who served for 29 days.

== List ==
If a governor served non-consecutive terms, their total time in office is counted. This list is accurate as of January 21, 2026

Incumbent

Rank	Governor	Time in office (days)	Term(s) in office	Political party	Refs
1	George Clinton	7,641	July 30, 1777 – June 30, 1795 July 1, 1801 – June 30, 1804	None Anti-Federalist Democratic-Republican	
2	Nelson Rockefeller	5,466	January 1, 1959 – December 18, 1973	Republican	
3	Thomas E. Dewey	4,383	January 1, 1943 – December 31, 1954	Republican	
3	Mario Cuomo	4,383	January 1, 1983 – December 31, 1994	Democratic	
3	George Pataki	4,383	January 1, 1995 – December 31, 2006	Republican	
6	Andrew Cuomo	3,888	January 1, 2011 – August 23, 2021	Democratic	
7	Herbert H. Lehman	3,624	January 1, 1933 – December 3, 1942	Democratic	
8	Daniel D. Tompkins	3,527	July 1, 1807 – February 24, 1817	Democratic-Republican	
9	DeWitt Clinton	3,147	July 1, 1817 – December 31, 1822 January 1, 1825 – February 11, 1828	Democratic-Republican	
10	Al Smith	2,923	January 1, 1919 – December 31, 1920 January 1, 1923 – December 31, 1928	Democratic	
11	Hugh Carey	2,922	January 1, 1975 – December 31, 1982	Democratic	
12	David B. Hill	2,551	January 6, 1885 – December 31, 1891	Democratic	
13	John Jay	2,191	July 1, 1795 – June 30, 1801	Federalist	
13	William L. Marcy	2,191	January 1, 1833 – December 31, 1838	Democratic	
15	Kathy Hochul	1,612	August 24, 2021 – present	Democratic	
16	William H. Seward	1,461	January 1, 1839 – December 31, 1842	Whig	
16	Horatio Seymour	1,461	January 1, 1853 – December 31, 1854 January 1, 1863 – December 31, 1864	Democratic	
16	Edwin D. Morgan	1,461	January 1, 1859 – December 31, 1862	Republican	
16	Reuben Fenton	1,461	January 1, 1865 – December 31, 1868	Republican	
16	John T. Hoffman	1,461	January 1, 1869 – December 31, 1872	Democratic	
16	Benjamin Odell	1,461	January 1, 1901 – December 31, 1904	Republican	
16	Charles Seymour Whitman	1,461	January 1, 1915 – December 31, 1918	Republican	
16	Franklin D. Roosevelt	1,461	January 1, 1929 – December 31, 1932	Democratic	
16	W. Averell Harriman	1,461	January 1, 1955 – December 31, 1958	Democratic	
25	Enos T. Throop	1,391	March 12, 1829 – December 31, 1832	Democratic	
26	Charles Evans Hughes	1,375	January 1, 1907 – October 6, 1910	Republican	
27	Alonzo B. Cornell	1,096	January 1, 1880 – December 31, 1882	Republican	
27	Roswell P. Flower	1,096	January 1, 1892 – December 31, 1894	Democratic	
29	Morgan Lewis	1,095	July 1, 1804 – June 30, 1807	Democratic-Republican	
29	Lucius Robinson	1,095	January 1, 1877 – December 31, 1879	Democratic	
31	David Paterson	1,020	March 17, 2008 – December 31, 2010	Democratic	
32	Grover Cleveland	737	January 1, 1883 – January 6, 1885	Democratic	
33	Joseph C. Yates	731	January 1, 1823 – December 31, 1824	Democratic-Republican	
33	William C. Bouck	731	January 1, 1843 – December 31, 1844	Democratic	
33	John Young	731	January 1, 1847 – December 31, 1848	Whig	
33	Washington Hunt	731	January 1, 1851 – December 31, 1852	Whig	
33	Myron H. Clark	731	January 1, 1855 – December 31, 1856	Whig	
33	Samuel J. Tilden	731	January 1, 1875 – December 31, 1876	Democratic	
33	Levi P. Morton	731	January 1, 1895 – December 31, 1896	Republican	
33	John Alden Dix	731	January 1, 1911 – December 31, 1912	Democratic	
41	Silas Wright	730	January 1, 1845 – December 31, 1846	Democratic	
41	Hamilton Fish	730	January 1, 1849 – December 31, 1850	Whig	
41	John A. King	730	January 1, 1857 – December 31, 1858	Republican	
41	John Adams Dix	730	January 1, 1873 – December 31, 1874	Republican	
41	Frank S. Black	730	January 1, 1897 – December 31, 1898	Republican	
41	Theodore Roosevelt	730	January 1, 1899 – December 31, 1900	Republican	
41	Frank W. Higgins	730	January 1, 1905 – December 31, 1906	Republican	
41	Nathan L. Miller	730	January 1, 1921 – December 31, 1922	Republican	
49	Eliot Spitzer	442	January 1, 2007 – March 17, 2008	Democratic	
50	Martin H. Glynn	441	October 17, 1913 – December 31, 1914	Democratic	
51	Malcolm Wilson	379	December 18, 1973 – December 31, 1974	Republican	
52	Nathaniel Pitcher	325	February 11, 1828 – December 31, 1828	Democratic-Republican	
53	William Sulzer	290	January 1, 1913 – October 17, 1913	Democratic	
54	John Tayler	127	February 24, 1817 – June 30, 1817	Democratic-Republican	
55	Horace White	87	October 6, 1910 – December 31, 1910	Republican	
56	Martin Van Buren	71	January 1, 1829 – March 12, 1829	Democratic	
57	Charles Poletti	29	December 3, 1942 – December 31, 1942	Democratic	
