= Fort Tompkins (Sackets Harbor, New York) =

Fort in Sacketts Harbor, New York state

Coordinates: 43°57.01′N 76°7.522′W

Site history
- Built by: New York Army National Guard
- In use: 1812-1815
- Battles/wars: War of 1812
- Events: Named for Governor Daniel D. Tompkins

Fort Tompkins (1812–1815) was a redoubt at Sackets Harbor, New York. A minor redoubt in a fortified line of four such "forts" (Kentucky, Virginia, Chauncey, Stark) anchored at Fort Pike (later Madison Barracks) on the bay, protecting the land side of Sackets Harbor.
