= 1780 New York gubernatorial election =

- April 25–27, 1780
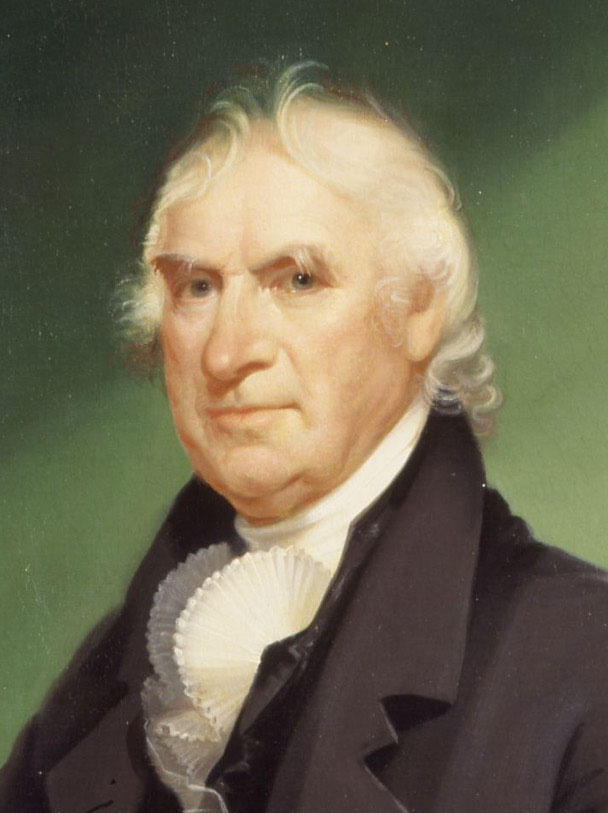
Nominee	George Clinton
Party	Nonpartisan
Governor before election
George Clinton
Nonpartisan
Elected Governor
George Clinton
Nonpartisan

A gubernatorial election was held in New York from April 25 to 27, 1780. George Clinton, the incumbent governor, was reelected by a plurality of 3,264 votes. The official returns for this election have been lost.

== See also ==
- New York gubernatorial elections
- New York state elections
