= 1836 New York gubernatorial election =

- November 7–9, 1836
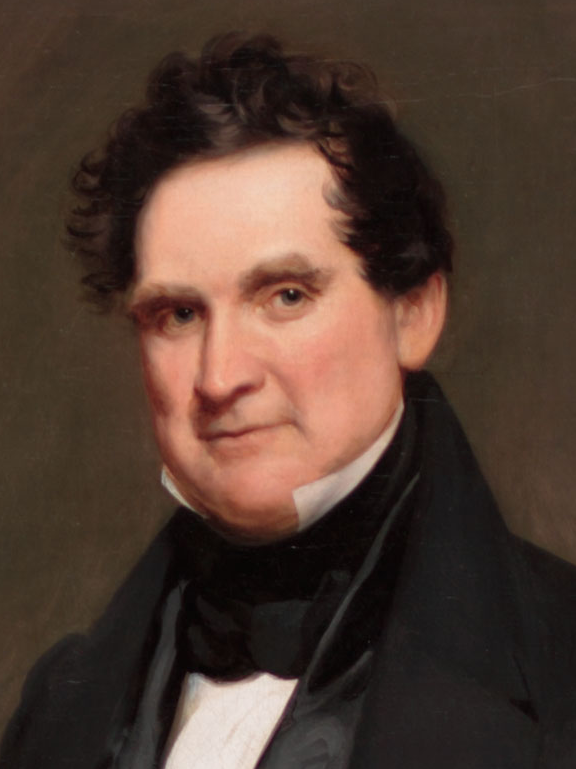

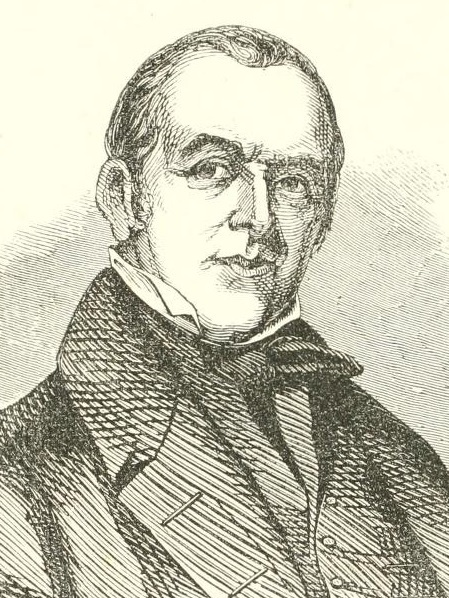
Nominee	William L. Marcy	Jesse Buel
Party	Democratic	Whig
Popular vote	166,122	136,648
Percentage	54.24%	44.62%
- Results by county Marcy 40–50% 50–60% 60–70% 70–80% Buel: 50–60% 60–70% No Data/Vote
Governor before election
William L. Marcy
Democratic
Elected Governor
William L. Marcy
Democratic

The 1836 New York gubernatorial election was held from November 7 to 9, 1836, to elect the Governor and Lieutenant Governor of New York.

== General election ==
=== Candidates ===
- Jesse Buel, newspaper publisher and agricultural reformer (Whig)
- William L. Marcy, incumbent Governor since 1833 and former U.S. Senator (Democratic)
- Isaac S. Smith (Locofoco)

The Democratic Party nominated incumbent Governor William L. Marcy. They nominated incumbent John Tracy for Lieutenant Governor.

The Whig Party nominated agricultural reformist Jesse Buel. They nominated former U.S. Representative Gamaliel H. Barstow for Lieutenant Governor.

The Locofoco Faction of the Democratic Party nominated Isaac S. Smith. They nominated Moses Jacques for Lieutenant Governor.

=== Results ===
The Democratic ticket of Marcy and Tracy was elected.

1836 New York gubernatorial election
Party	Candidate	Votes	%	±%
Democratic	William L. Marcy (incumbent)	166,122	54.24%	+2.40%
Whig	Jesse Buel	136,648	44.62%	−3.54%
Locofoco	Isaac S. Smith	3,496	1.14%	N/A
Total votes		306,266	100%	

== Sources ==
Result: The Tribune Almanac 1841
