= 1810 North Carolina gubernatorial election =

- December 1, 1810
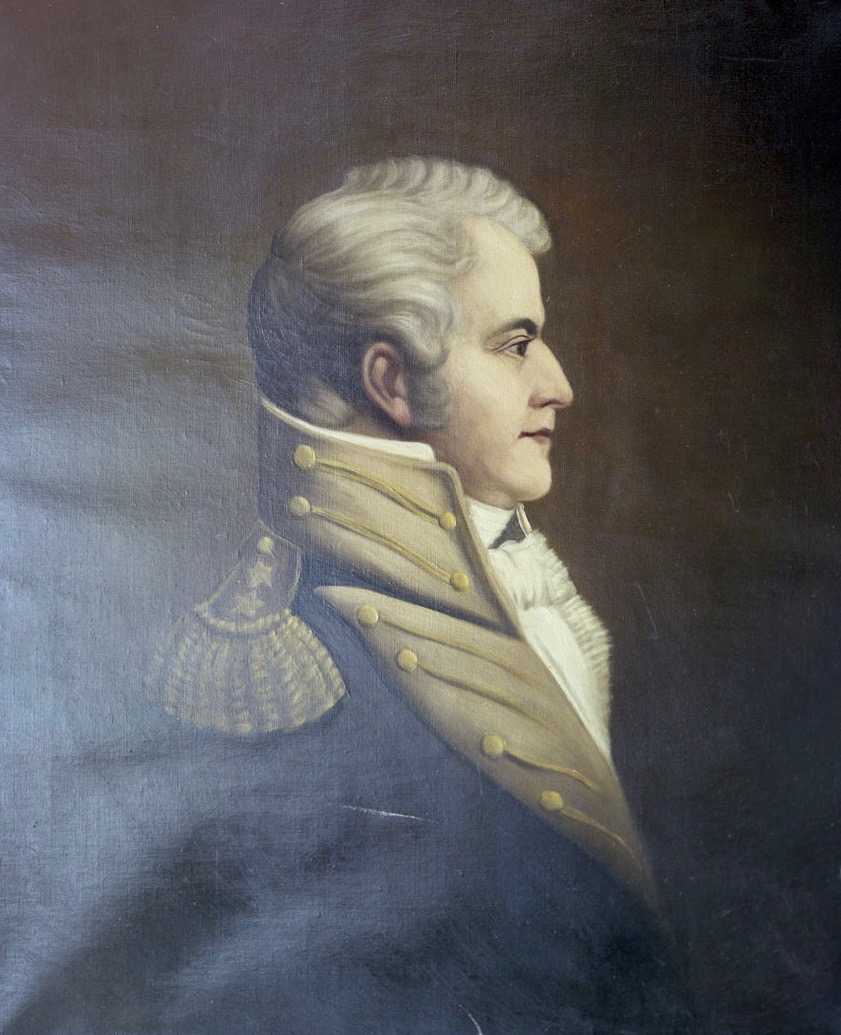

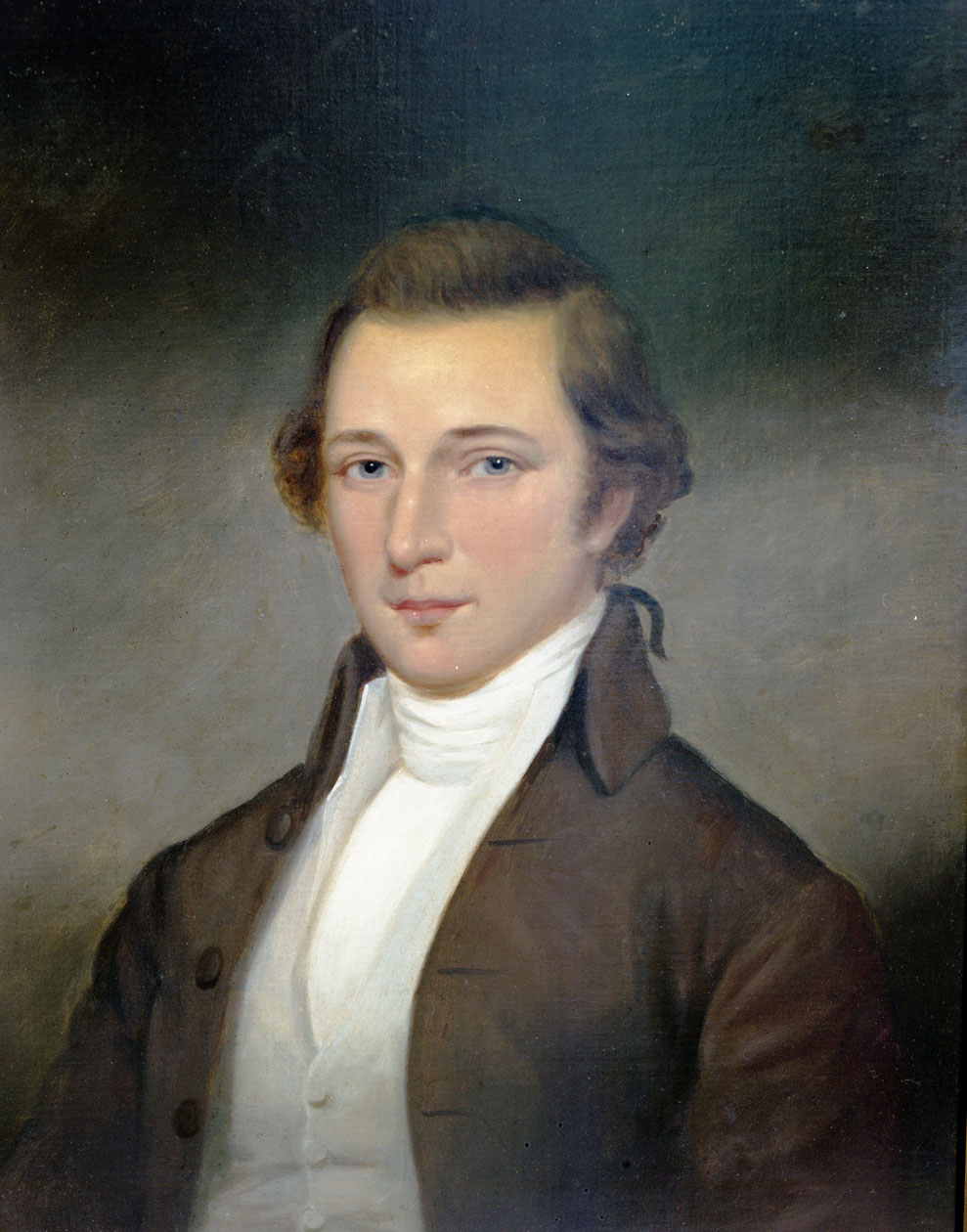
Nominee	Benjamin Smith	David Stone
Party	Democratic-Republican	Democratic-Republican
Popular vote	97	84
Percentage	53.59%	46.41%
Governor before election
David Stone
Democratic-Republican
Elected Governor
Benjamin Smith
Democratic-Republican

The 1810 North Carolina gubernatorial election was held on December 1, 1810, in order to elect the governor of North Carolina. Democratic-Republican candidate and former Adjutant General of North Carolina Benjamin Smith was elected by the North Carolina General Assembly against incumbent Democratic-Republican governor David Stone.

== General election ==
On election day, December 1, 1810, Democratic-Republican candidate Benjamin Smith was elected by the North Carolina General Assembly by a margin of 13 votes against his opponent incumbent Democratic-Republican governor David Stone, thereby retaining Democratic-Republican control over the office of governor. Smith was sworn in for his second term on December 5, 1810.

=== Results ===
North Carolina gubernatorial election, 1810
Party	Candidate	Votes	%
Democratic-Republican	Benjamin Smith	97	53.59
Democratic-Republican	David Stone (incumbent)	84	46.41
Total votes		181	100.00
Democratic-Republican hold			
