= 1813 New York gubernatorial election =

- April 1813
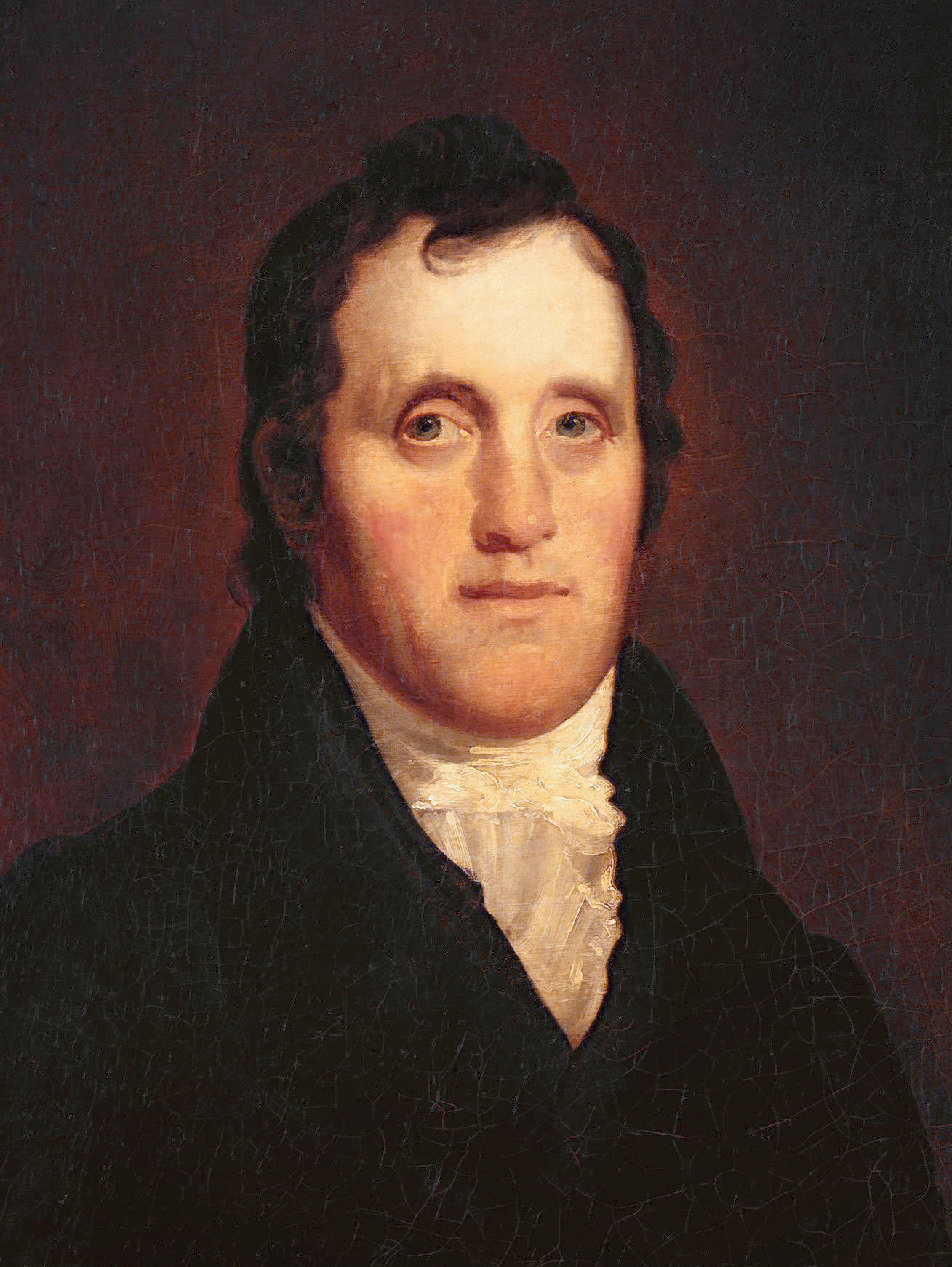

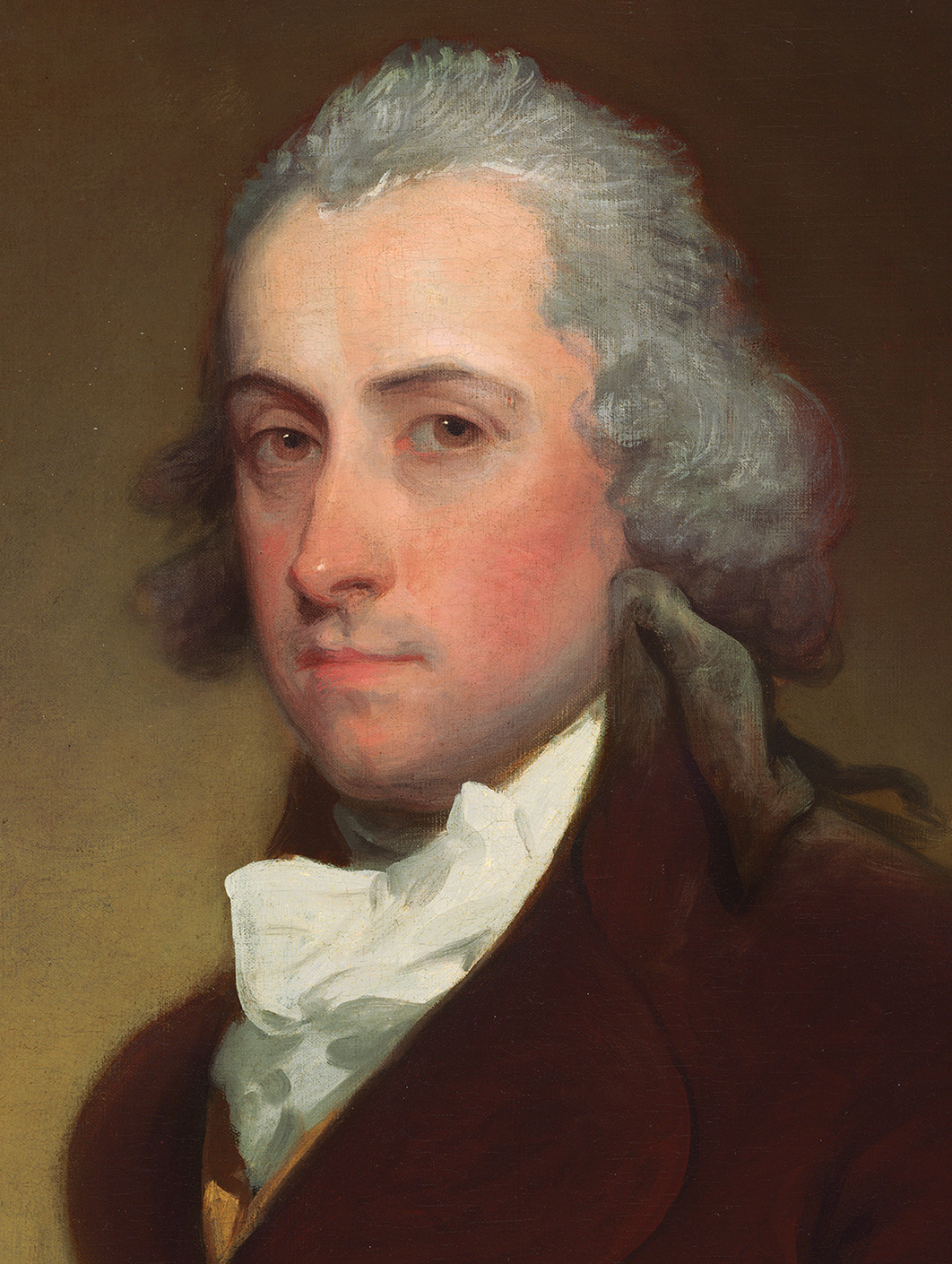
| Nominee | Daniel D. Tompkins | Stephen Van Rensselaer |
| Party | Democratic-Republican | Federalist |
| Popular vote | 43,324 | 39,718 |
| Percentage | 52.17% | 47.83% |
- County results Tompkins: 50–60% 60–70% 70–80% 80–90% 90–100% Rensselaer: 50–60% 60–70% 70–80% No Data/Vote
Governor before election
Daniel D. Tompkins
Democratic-Republican
Elected Governor
Daniel D. Tompkins
Democratic-Republican

The 1813 New York gubernatorial election was held in April 1813 to elect the Governor and Lieutenant Governor of New York. Daniel D. Tompkins was elected to a third term in office, defeating Stephen Van Rensselaer.

== General election ==
=== Candidates ===
- Daniel D. Tompkins, incumbent Governor since 1807
- Stephen Van Rensselaer, former Lieutenant Governor and nominee for Governor in 1801

=== Results ===
The Democratic-Republican ticket of Tompkins and Tayler was elected.

1813 New York gubernatorial election
| Party | Candidate | Votes | % | ±% |
|---|---|---|---|---|
| Democratic-Republican | Daniel D. Tompkins (incumbent) | 43,324 | 52.17% | ▼1.98 |
| Federalist | Stephen Van Rensselaer | 39,718 | 47.83% | ▲1.98 |
| Total votes | | 83,042 | 100% | |

== See also ==
- New York gubernatorial elections
- New York state elections
