= 1783 New York gubernatorial election =

- April 29–May 1, 1783
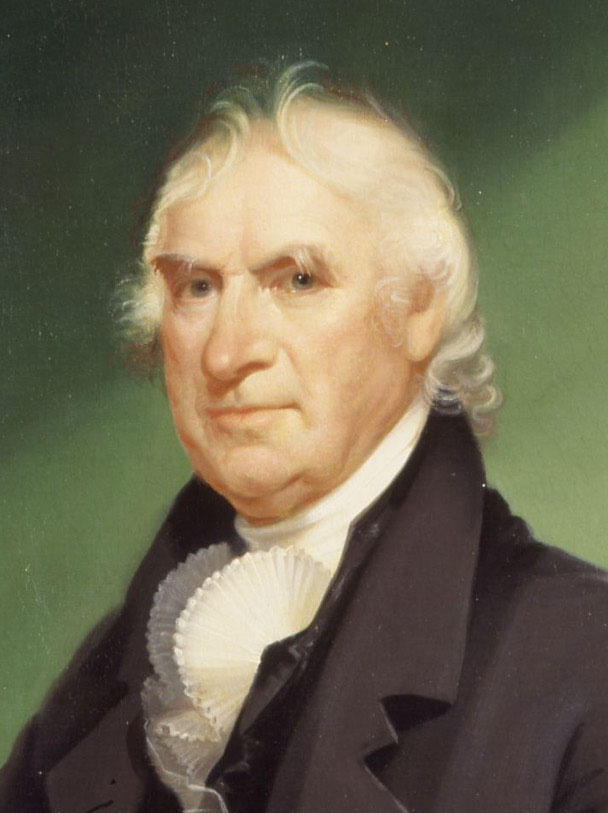

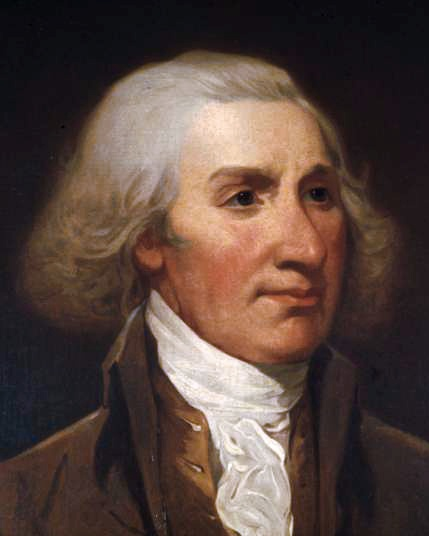

Nominee	George Clinton	Philip Schuyler	Ephraim Paine
Party	Nonpartisan	Nonpartisan	Nonpartisan
Popular vote	3,584	643	520
Percentage	75.50%	13.55%	10.95%
Governor before election
George Clinton
Nonpartisan
Elected Governor
George Clinton
Nonpartisan

A gubernatorial election was held in New York from April 29 to May 1, 1783. George Clinton, the incumbent governor, defeated Philip Schuyler, the surveyor general, and Ephraim Paine, the senator from the middle district.

== Background ==
In March 1783, the New York legislature repealed the act granting all import duties to the United States government under the Articles of Confederation. In its place, the legislature passed a law granting such duties but restricting their collection and reserving the power of appointment of collecting officers to the state of New York. The tariff duties issue, along with the ongoing debate over the new Constitution of the United States, formed the basis for the early development of political factions in the state. The import duties, which were incredibly valuable given the prominence of the Port of New York City, formed the basis of a larger debate over the nature of New York's sovereignty and association with the other independent American states.

The nationalist faction, which supported the unrestricted grant of duties to the United States, was led by Alexander Hamilton, John Jay, Robert R. Livingston, Philip Schuyler, and the Van Rensselaer family. The opposition was led by Governor George Clinton, who had served in the state's highest office since its establishment following the Revolution with little opposition, having been returned unanimously in 1780. His supporters included Robert Yates, John Lansing, and Melancton Smith. These factions are informally known as the Federalists and anti-Federalists, respectively.

== Results ==
1783 New York gubernatorial election
Party	Candidate	Votes	%
Nonpartisan	George Clinton (incumbent)	3,584	75.50%
Nonpartisan	Philip Schuyler	643	13.55%
Nonpartisan	Ephraim Paine	520	10.95%
Total votes		4,747	100%

== See also ==
- New York gubernatorial elections
- New York state elections
