= 1820 New York gubernatorial election =

- April 1820
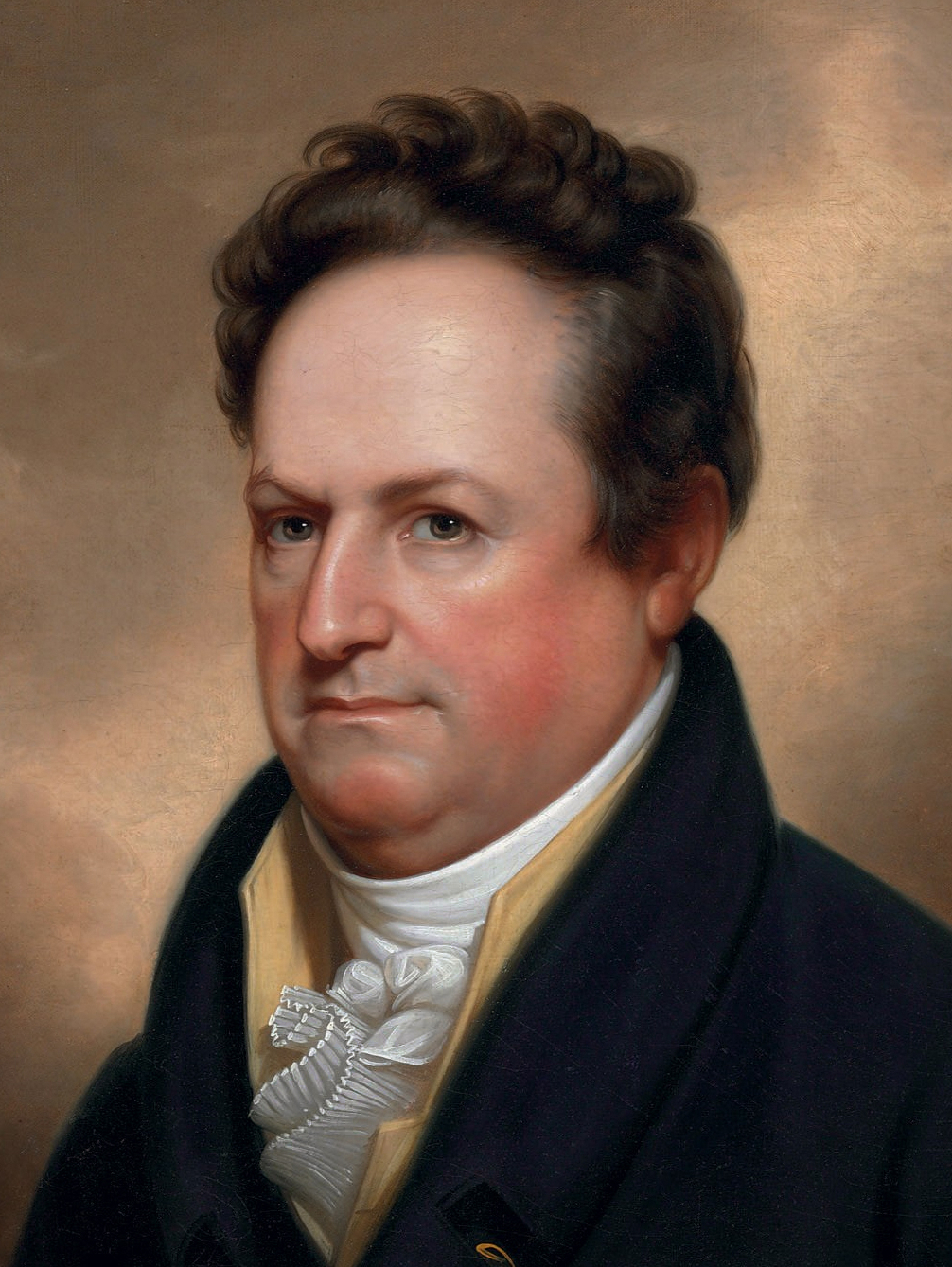

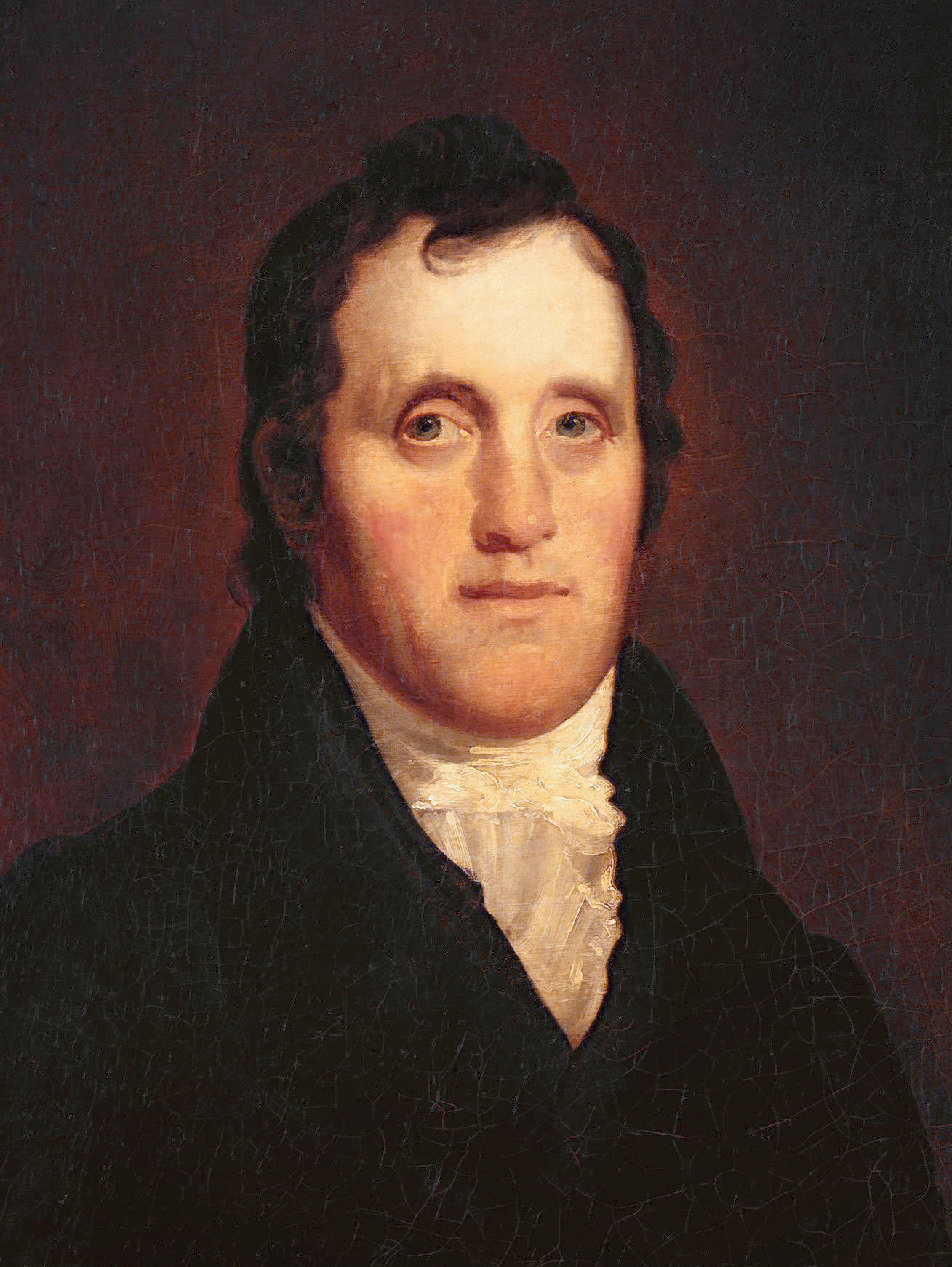
Nominee	DeWitt Clinton	Daniel D. Tompkins
Party	Democratic-Republican	Democratic-Republican
Alliance	Clintonian	Anti-Clintonian
Popular vote	47,447	45,990
Percentage	50.78%	49.22%
- County results Clinton: 50–60% 60–70% 70–80% Tompkins: 50–60% 60–70% 70–80% 80–90%
Governor before election
DeWitt Clinton
Democratic-Republican
Elected Governor
DeWitt Clinton
Democratic-Republican

The 1820 New York gubernatorial election was held in April 1820 to elect the Governor and Lieutenant Governor of New York.

Incumbent Governor DeWitt Clinton was re-elected to a second term in office over Daniel D. Tompkins, his predecessor and the Vice President of the United States.

== Background ==
In 1816, Governor Daniel D. Tompkins was elected Vice President of the United States as the running mate of James Monroe and resigned the office of governor. DeWitt Clinton was the sole candidate for the 1817 special election to succeed him, despite opposition from the Tammany Hall organization.

This was the first election where the Governor of New York was elected to serve a 2 year term. A practice that would continue until 1876 when it was expanded back to a 3 year term as used previously.

== General election ==
=== Candidates ===
- DeWitt Clinton, incumbent Governor of New York since 1817
- Daniel D. Tompkins, Vice President of the United States since 1817 and former Governor of New York

The Clintonian faction of the Democratic-Republican Party nominated incumbent DeWitt Clinton. For Lieutenant Governor they nominated incumbent John Tayler.

The anti-Clintonian faction of the Democratic-Republican Party nominated Vice President Daniel D. Tompkins.

=== Results ===
The Clintonian ticket of Clinton and Tayler was elected.

1820 New York gubernatorial election
Party	Candidate	Votes	%
Democratic-Republican (Clintonian)	DeWitt Clinton (incumbent)	47,447	50.78%
Democratic-Republican (Anti-Clintonian)	Daniel D. Tompkins	45,990	49.22%
Total votes		93,437	100%

== See also ==
- New York gubernatorial elections
- New York state elections

== Sources ==
Result: The Tribune Almanac 1841
