= Jesse Buel =

American publisher, agricultural reformer, and politician (1778–1839)

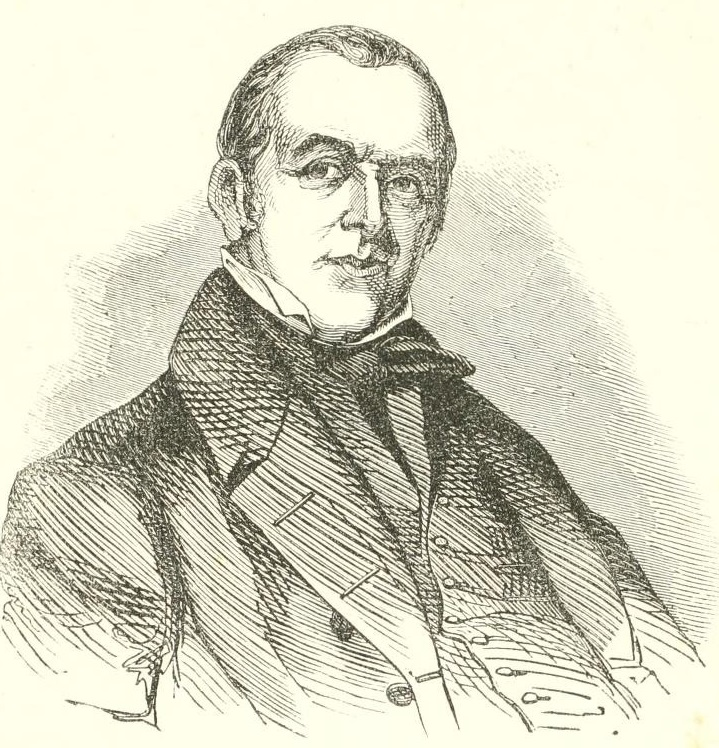
Jesse Buel, from William Hunt's Biographical Sketch Book (1848)

Jesse Buel (January 4, 1778 – October 6, 1839) was an American newspaper publisher, agricultural reformer, and politician.

== Early life ==
Jesse Buel was born on a farm in Coventry, Connecticut, the youngest of 14 children. At the age of 12 he moved with his family to Rutland, Vermont. He served an apprenticeship to a Rutland printer and later worked as a journeyman printer on New York City and upstate New York newspapers.

== Newspaper career ==
Between 1797 and 1821, Buel published newspapers: the Northern Budget (Lansingburgh and Troy), 1797-1801; the Guardian (Poughkeepsie), 1801–02; the Political Barometer (Poughkeepsie), 1802–03; the Plebian (Kingston), 1803-1813; and the Argus (Albany), 1813-21. In the process, he built up a considerable fortune in capital and property. He was also the official state printer during his time in Albany.

== Agricultural reform efforts ==
In 1821, Buel, then 43, surprised many of his acquaintances by announcing that he was leaving his profitable printing business to pursue his long-standing interest in the cause of agricultural reform. Echoing Thomas Jefferson, Buel believed that, "Agriculture is truly our nursing mother, which gives food, and growth, and wealth, and moral health and character to our country. It may be considered the great wheel which moves all the machinery of society." He bought an 85-acre property west of Albany to establish his own farm where he could put his reform principles into practice. Like other reformers of the period, he saw close links among social, moral, and economic improvement, and translated these into farming through an emphasis on good stewardship of farmland through maintaining its fertility rather than exploiting it in search of faster profits.

Buel also campaigned for the establishment of a state agricultural school. He helped to found the New York State Agricultural Society in 1832 and served several times as its president. In 1834, he launched The Cultivator, one of the most popular of the many agricultural journals being published for American farmers in this period. Buel wrote extensively for other agricultural publications. His ideas were widely disseminated in two collections of his work: The Farmer's Companion; or Essays on the Principles and Practices of American Husbandry (1838) and the two-volume Farmer's Instructor (1841, 1844), chiefly made up of selections from The Cultivator.

== Political career ==
Buel was a vocal champion of agricultural reform. He served in the New York State Assembly for many years and was Ulster County's judge of the court of common pleas while living in Kingston. In 1826, he was appointed to the Board of Regents of the University of the State of New York. He ran unsuccessfully as the Whig candidate in the 1836 New York gubernatorial election.

== Death and burial ==
Buel died in Danbury while there to deliver a lecture to the local agricultural societies. He was buried in Albany's State Street Cemetery, and was later reburied at Albany Rural Cemetery.

== Writings ==
- (editor) A Treatise on Agriculture, John Armstrong (1819)
- The Farmer's Companion; or Essays on the Principles and Practices of American Husbandry (1838)
- The Farmer's Instructor, volume I (1841)
- The Farmer's Instructor, volume II (1844)

Party political offices
Preceded by William H. Seward	Whig nominee for Governor of New York; 1836	Succeeded by William H. Seward
