= 1789 New York gubernatorial election =

- April 1789
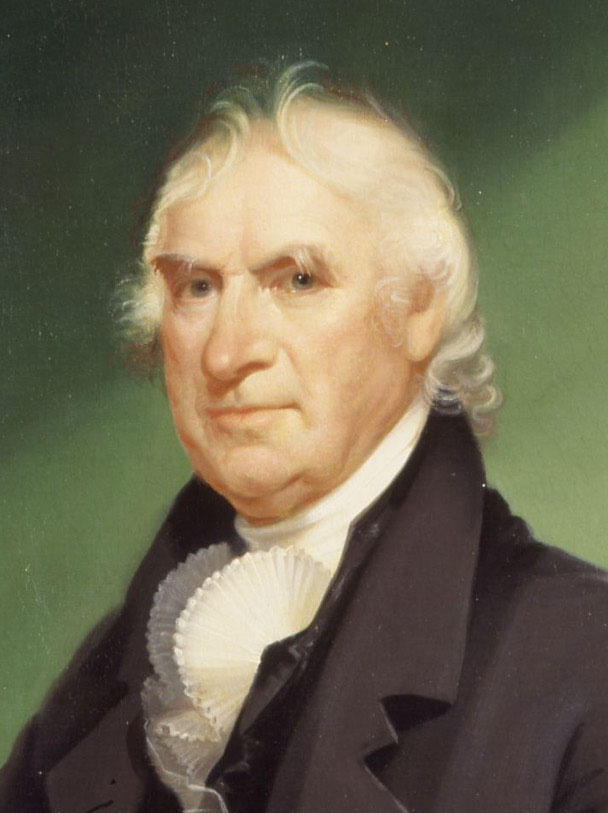

Nominee	George Clinton	Robert Yates
Party	Anti-Administration	Anti-Administration
Alliance		Federalist
Popular vote	6,391	5,962
Percentage	51.74%	48.26%
- County results Clinton: 50–60% 70–80% 80–90% >90% Yates: 50–60% 60–70%
Governor before election
George Clinton
Nonpartisan
Elected Governor
George Clinton
Nonpartisan

The 1789 New York gubernatorial election was held in April 1789 to elect the Governor of New York for a term beginning in July 1789. Incumbent Governor George Clinton was narrowly re-elected to a fifth consecutive term in office over Robert Yates.

== Background ==
From the establishment of an independent government of New York in 1777, George Clinton had continuously served in the office of Governor; he had no opponent in 1780 or 1786. During that previous decade, New York politics had coalesced around two loose factions: a federalist faction led by Alexander Hamilton, John Jay, Robert R. Livingston, Philip Schuyler, and the Van Rensselaer family, which favored adoption of the proposed United States Constitution and an anti-federalist faction led by Governor Clinton, Robert Yates, John Lansing, and Melancton Smith, which opposed ratification without serious revision.

At the New York convention to ratify the Constitution in 1788, Clinton presided over a sharp division between the federalists and anti-federalists. The final vote favored ratification of the Constitution as written by a vote of 30–27. Clinton, despite his anti-federalist views, closed the convention by vowing to exercise his office to enforce it and maintain order. However, partisan divisions were sharpened by the formation of a new national administration under President George Washington, who sought to elevate Hamilton, Jay, and other federalists to his administration without representation for the Clinton faction.

=== Qualifications ===
Under Article VII of the New York Constitution of 1777, only certain male freeholders and certain freemen of Albany or New York City could vote:

VII. That every male inhabitant of full age, who shall have personally resided within one of the counties of this State for six months immediately preceding the day of election, shall, at such election, be entitled to vote for representatives of the said county in assembly; if, during the time aforesaid, he shall have been a freeholder, possessing a freehold of the value of twenty pounds, within the said county, or have rented a tenement therein of the yearly value of forty shillings, and been rated and actually paid taxes to this State: Provided always, That every person who now is a freeman of the city of Albany, or who was made a freeman of the city of New York on or before the fourteenth day of October, in the year of our Lord one thousand seven hundred and seventy-five, and shall be actually and usually resident in the said cities, respectively, shall be entitled to vote for representatives in assembly within his said place of residence.

== Federalist nomination ==
=== Candidates ===
- Richard Morris, chief justice of the New York Supreme Court
- Robert Yates, justice of the New York Supreme Court

For the first time, the federalist faction actively organized to block Clinton's re-election. In light of the incumbent's broad popularity, they sought to nominate an anti-federalist in order to divide the majority faction. At a meeting in New York City on February 11, they appointed a committee of correspondence to manage the campaign, consisting of Hamilton, William Duer, Robert Troup and anti-federalist Aaron Burr, who defected to oppose Clinton. The meeting nominated Supreme Court justice Robert Yates. On February 24, Yates accepted the nomination.

There was a movement to nominate Richard Morris, who was favored by the majority within the federalist faction, but he declined to be a candidate on February 27.

== General election ==
=== Candidates ===
- George Clinton, incumbent Governor since 1777
- Robert Yates, justice of the New York Supreme Court

Incumbent Pierre Van Cortlandt was the only candidate for Lieutenant Governor.

=== Results ===
Clinton was re-elected to a fifth term in office, albeit by the lowest margin to date. In his home county of Ulster, Clinton won 1,039 out of 1,245 votes. However, federalists won a majority of the seats in the New York Assembly.

1789 New York gubernatorial election
Party	Candidate	Votes	%
Anti-Administration	George Clinton (incumbent)	6,391	51.74%
Anti-Administration	Robert Yates	5,962	48.26%
Total votes		12,353	100%

== See also ==
- New York gubernatorial elections
- New York state elections
