= Fort Tompkins (Buffalo, New York) =

Fort in Buffalo, New York State

Coordinates: 42°54.64′N 78°54.011′W

Site history
- Built by: New York Army National Guard
- In use: 1812
- Battles/wars: War of 1812
- Events: Named for Governor Daniel D. Tompkins

Fort Tompkins, also known as Fort Adams, was an earthwork fort in Buffalo, New York overlooking the Niagara River. Built in August 1812 on top of the bluff at the bend of Niagara Street, the fort was a large earthwork mounting seven guns, and was the largest of eight batteries erected that summer. Located to the south was Old Sow Battery, and to the north was Gibson's Battery.

During the War of 1812, British forces attacked Black Rock in July 1813, destroying the Black Rock Blockhouse and spiking or carrying off the guns at Fort Tompkins. It later became the location of street railway barns in 1914.
