= 1810 New York gubernatorial election =

- April 1810
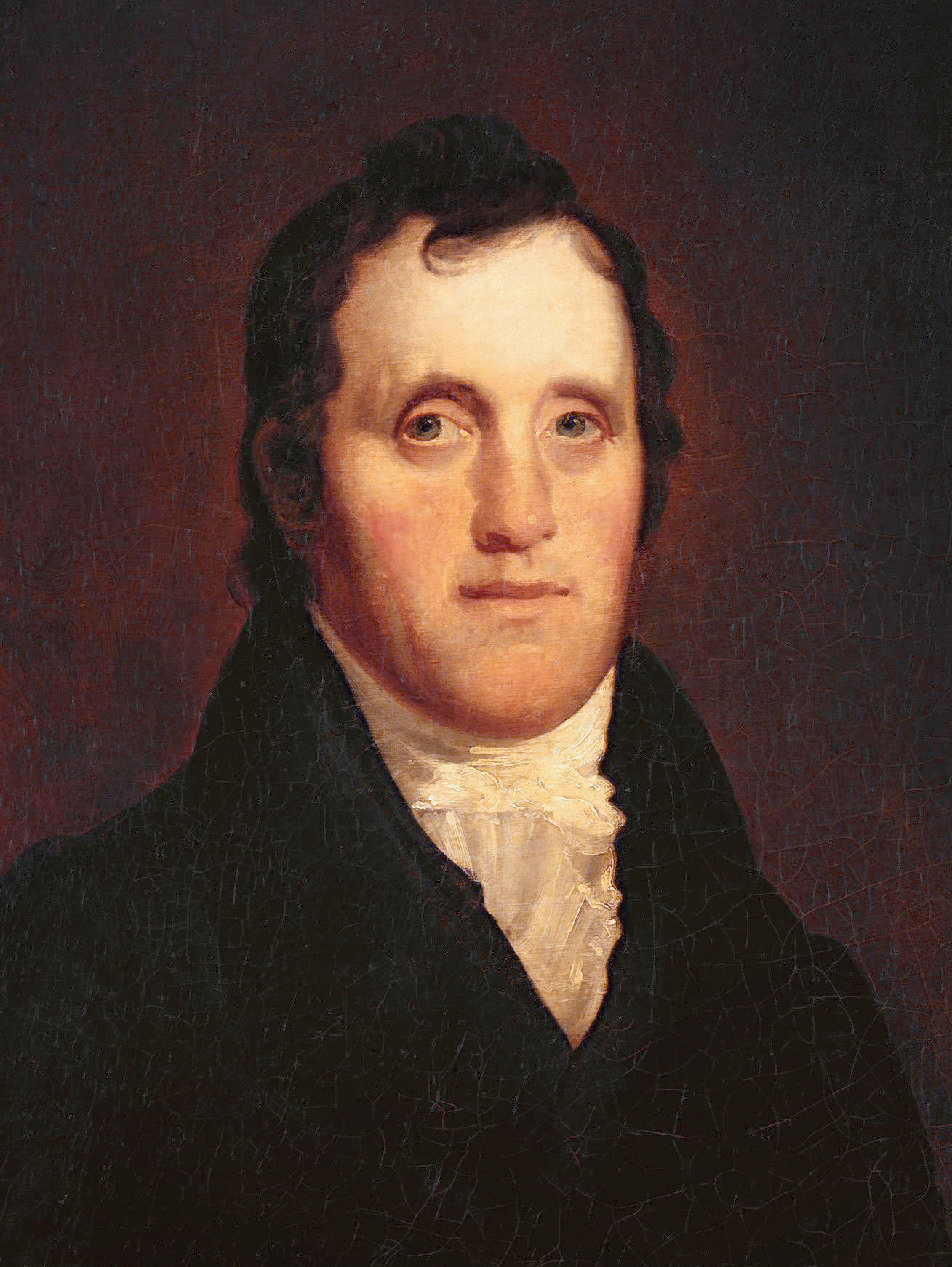

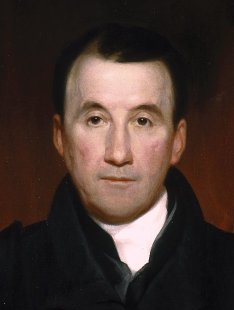
Nominee	Daniel D. Tompkins	Jonas Platt
Party	Democratic-Republican	Federalist
Popular vote	43,094	36,484
Percentage	54.15%	45.85%
- County results Tompkins: 50–60% 60–70% 70–80% 80–90% Platt: 50–60% 60–70%
Governor before election
Daniel D. Tompkins
Democratic-Republican
Elected Governor
Daniel D. Tompkins
Democratic-Republican

The 1810 New York gubernatorial election was held in April 1810. Governor Daniel D. Tompkins was elected to a second term in office over Jonas Platt.

== Background ==
Governor Daniel D. Tompkins was elected in 1807 as the candidate representing the Clinton faction of the Republican Party, defeating Morgan Lewis, a member of the Livingston family. Shortly after his election, however, Tompkins defied De Witt Clinton by supporting the policy of President Thomas Jefferson, particularly the Embargo of 1807. Clinton soon revised his position and joined the Republican supporters of Jefferson, but the conflict between the Clintons and the "Virginia dynasty" escalated when James Madison was nominated for president over George Clinton in 1808. Lewis and the Livingstons supported Madison. After Madison won the election, the Lewis-Livingston faction worked to undermine De Witt Clinton's influence in the state. With Tompkins working to confirm his own political independence and popularity, Clinton's power faded. However, the main beneficiaries were the moribund Federalist Party, who regained many legislative seats in 1808 and 1809 out of opposition to the 1807 embargo.

== Nominations ==
The Federalist Party met in Albany on January 5, 1810, and nominated Jonas Platt, a pioneer from Oneida County and senator-elect.

Because of the growing threat from the Federalist Party, the Republicans set aside their differences and unified behind Governor Tompkins. The Republican legislators met on February 5, 1810, and nominated Tompkins and Lieutenant Governor Broome without a dissenting vote.

== General election ==
=== Candidates ===
- Daniel D. Tompkins, incumbent Governor since 1807 (Republican)
- Jonas Platt, State Senator and former U.S. Representative from Poughkeepsie (Federalist)

=== Campaign ===
The revitalized Federalist Party waged an active, life-or-death campaign for Platt. However, their criticism of the Embargo of 1807 was blunted by its repeal and the Erksine agreement, which restored full trade with Great Britain. Republicans, energized by their removal from many state offices by the Federalist Council of Appointments, were equally active and enlisted the help of the James Madison administration. Republican harmony was not universal, as several "Martling Men" (members of the Tammany Society and friends of the Madison administration) maneuvered to undermine De Witt Clinton as party leader.

=== Results ===
The Democratic-Republican ticket of Tompkins and Broome was elected. Broome would die 4 months later, necessitating a special election.

1810 New York gubernatorial election
Party	Candidate	Votes	%
Democratic-Republican	Daniel D. Tompkins (incumbent)	43,094	54.15%
Federalist	Jonas Platt	36,484	45.85%
Total votes		79,578	100%

== See also ==
- New York gubernatorial elections
- New York state elections
