= Fort Tompkins (Plattsburgh, New York) =

Fort in Plattsburgh, New York State

Coordinates: 40.6049°N 74.0567°W

- Plattsburgh, New York

Site history
- Built by: New York Army National Guard
- In use: 1814
- Battles/wars: War of 1812
- Events: Named for Governor Daniel D. Tompkins

Fort Tompkins was a small fort in Plattsburgh, New York, c. 1814.

After the British defeat at the Battle of Plattsburgh, two additional forts were added near Forts Brown, Moreau, and Scott. Fort Tompkins was constructed southwest of Brown and contained three cannons. Fort Gaines was added between Tompkins and the lake, which created a pentagon shaped complex which was later connected with curtain walls.
