= 1810 Virginia gubernatorial election =

- December 7, 1810
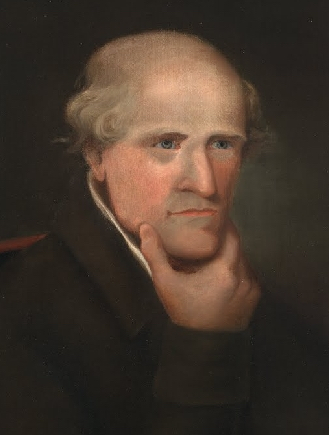
Nominee	John Tyler Sr.
Governor before election
John Tyler Sr.
Democratic-Republican
Elected Governor
John Tyler Sr.
Democratic-Republican (Note: Contemporary sources no parties for this election. Both Kallenbach and Kallenbach and Sobel and Raimo list Tyler as a Democratic-Republican during his tenure.)

A gubernatorial election was held in Virginia on December 7, 1810. The incumbent governor of Virginia John Tyler Sr. was re-elected without opposition.

The election was conducted by the Virginia General Assembly in joint session. Tyler was elected with a majority on the first ballot.

== General election ==
1810 Virginia gubernatorial election
Candidate	First ballot	
Candidate	Count	Percent
John Tyler Sr. (incumbent)	**	
Total	**	100.00

== Bibliography ==
- Kallenbach, Joseph E.; Kallenbach, Jessamine S. (1977). American State Governors, 1776–1976. Vol. 1. Dobbs Ferry, NY: Oceana Publications.
- Sobel, Robert; Raimo, John (1978). Biographical Directory of the Governors of the United States 1789–1978. Vol. 4. Westport, CT: Meckler Books.
- Virginia (1810). Journal of the Senate [...]. Richmond.
