= 1807 New York gubernatorial election =

- April 1807
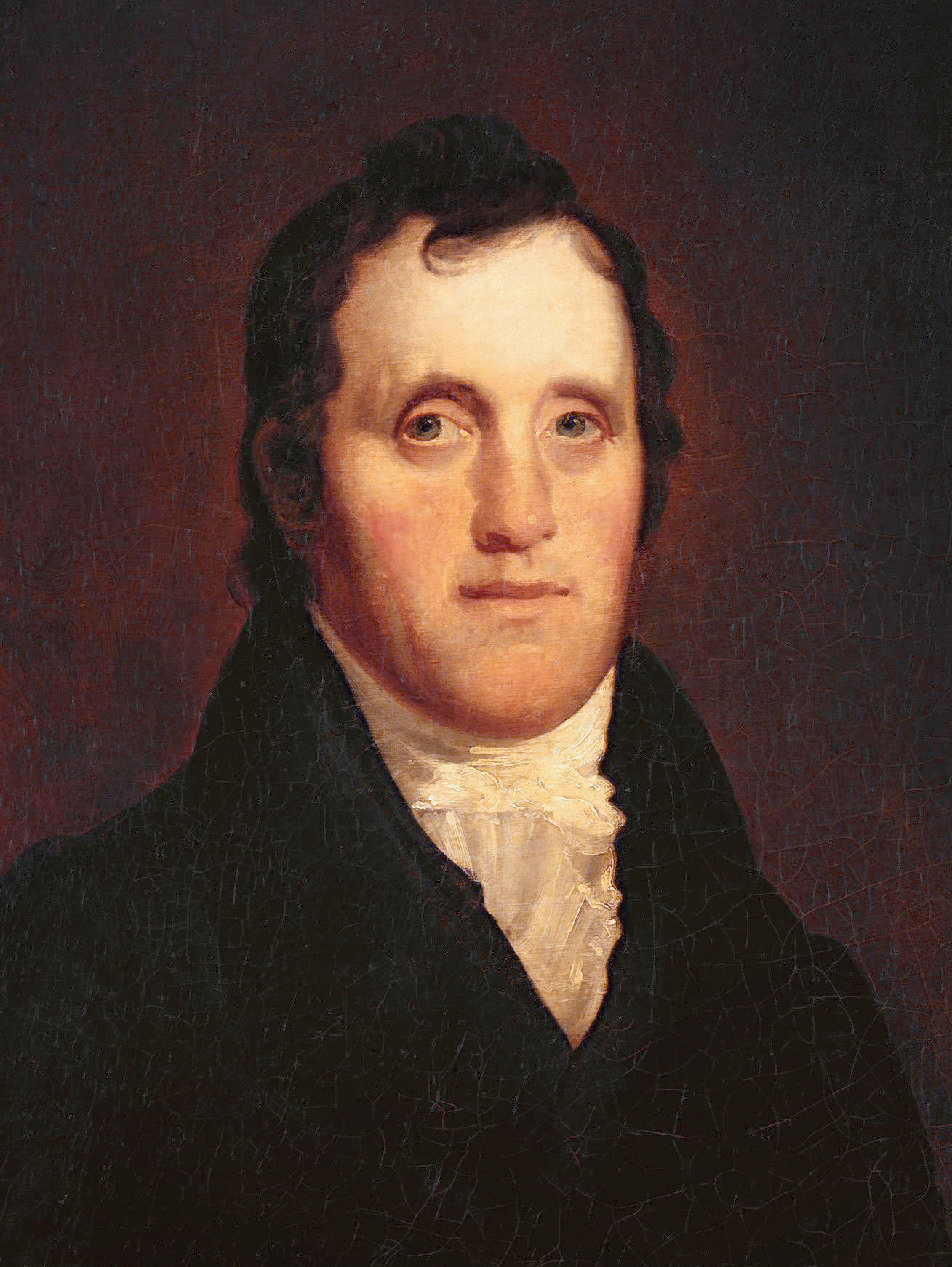

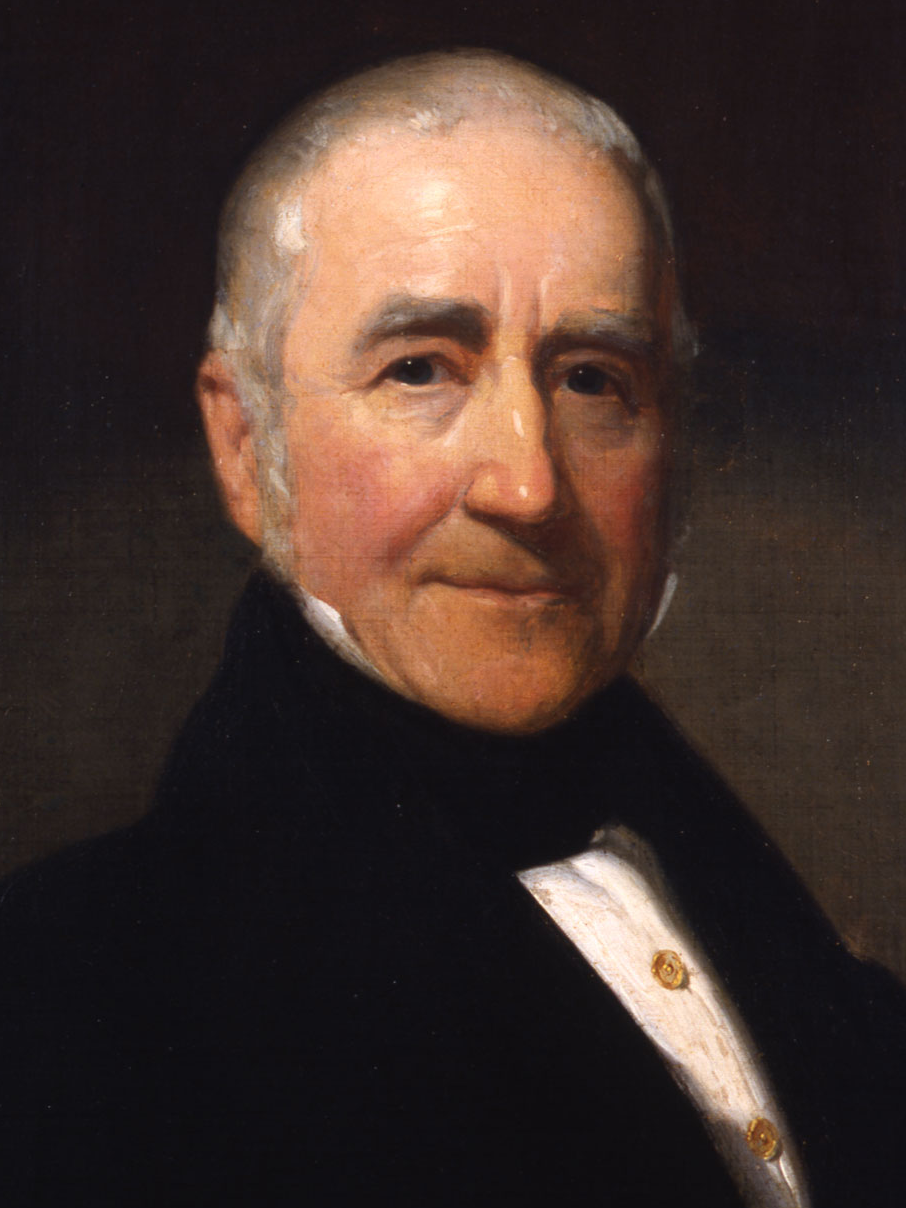
Nominee	Daniel D. Tompkins	Morgan Lewis
Party	Democratic-Republican	Democratic-Republican
Alliance	Clinton	Livingston; Federalist
Popular vote	35,074	30,989
Percentage	53.09%	46.91%
- County results Tompkins: 50–60% 60–70% 70–80% 80–90% Lewis: 50–60% 60–70% 70–80%
Governor before election
Morgan Lewis
Democratic-Republican
Elected Governor
Daniel D. Tompkins
Democratic-Republican

The 1807 New York gubernatorial election was held in April 1807 to elect the Governor. Incumbent Governor Morgan Lewis ran for a second consecutive term in office but was defeated by Daniel D. Tompkins, who had the support of the influential Clinton family.

== Background ==
Following the 1804 New York gubernatorial election and the Burr-Hamilton duel, which resulted in the death of Federalist leader Alexander Hamilton and the disgrace of Vice President and Tammany Hall leader Aaron Burr, New York was politically dominated by two Republican factions led by two powerful families. The Clinton family was led by Vice President of the United States and former Governor George Clinton and his nephew, New York City mayor De Witt Clinton. The Livingston family was led by Robert R. Livingston, Edward Livingston, and their brother-in-law, Governor Morgan Lewis.

During the 1805 legislative session, conflict between the factions arose over Lewis's approval of a charter for the Merchants' National Bank of New York, a challenger to the Clinton- and Republican-owned Manhattan Company. Lewis's son-in-law Maturin Livingston was a major backer of the Merchants' Bank, and bribery and coercion were used to pass the charter. The Livingston family also dominated state appointments under Lewis, and dissatisfaction with their administration manifested near te end of the legislative session. Shortly after the spring 1805 legislative elections, the conflict between the Clintons and Livingstons became public. Leading Republican newspapers (the American Citizen and Albany Register) came out against Governor Lewis; other newspapers, including those owned by Aaron Burr (the New York Morning Chronicle), Thomas Tillotson (the Poughkeepsie Journal) and Jesse Buel (the Ulster County Plebeian), supported Lewis.

Expecting that Lewis would benefit from Federalist support, De Witt Clinton and his supporters held a series of meetings with leading supporters of Aaron Burr and Tammany Hall in winter 1806. A counter-meeting of Lewis supporters from all factions was held at Martling's Long Room in New York on February 24, denouncing Clinton's efforts to unseat the Governor. The meeting led Clinton opponents to be known as "Martling Men". The room, which became known as the Wigwam, was the first headquarters of the Tammany Society.

During the 1806 legislative session, Lewis came under political fire for granting reprieve in the case of Stephen Arnold, a death row convict scheduled to be executed for killing a child, and his role in approving the Merchants' Bank charter. De Witt Clinton, who had engineered his own election to the Council of Appointment, led inquests into the role of bribery in the Merchants' Bank case. The Council of Appointment also wielded its authority to replace Livingston men, including Maturin Livingston and Thomas Tillotson, from state offices. Federalists in the Legislature, led by William W. Van Ness, supported Lewis. Despite the barrage of attacks from the Clintonians, the April 1806 elections were a victory for the Lewis-Federalist legislators. Having regained control of the Legislature and Council, they began to remove Clinton supporters from office, including removing De Witt Clinton himself as mayor of New York City.

== Nominations ==
As it had become evident Lewis could not rely on the support of the Republican legislators, a mass meeting to support him was held in New York City on January 1, 1807. The attendees addressed a circular letter to the Republican legislators calling for their support prior to the start of the legislative session.

However, a majority of Republican legislators met in caucus on February 16 to nominate an opposition candidate. De Witt Clinton was rejected for his association with the political animosities of the prior two years and his ambition, as was his brother-in-law, Ambrose Spencer. Instead, they settled on the relatively unknown Daniel D. Tompkins, a Supreme Court judge and active participant in the 1801 constitutional convention. The nomination was supported by sixty-five Republican legislators.

A few days after Tompkins was formally nominated, a second Republican caucus was held to support Lewis; forty-five members endorsed his nomination. The Federalists made no nomination, but most supported Lewis.

== General election ==
=== Candidates ===
- Morgan Lewis, incumbent Governor since 1804 (Livingston Republican)
- Daniel D. Tompkins, associate justice of the New York Supreme Court of Judicature (Clinton Republican)

==== Not nominated ====
- De Witt Clinton, former mayor of New York City (Clinton Republican)
- Ambrose Spencer,

=== Campaign ===
During the campaign, John Lansing Jr., who had declined the nomination in 1804 which had ultimately gone to Lewis, accused George Clinton of offering him the nomination in exchange for appointing De Witt Clinton to succeed Lansing as Chancellor. Both Clintons denied the accusation.

=== Results ===
In a reversal of the result of the 1804 results, Lewis carried five of the six counties he had lost to Aaron Burr. (Note: Only Delaware County voted for Burr in 1804 and Tompkins in 1807.)

Despite losing New York City's 1,673 votes to 1,807, Daniel D. Tompkins defeated incumbent Morgan Lewis.

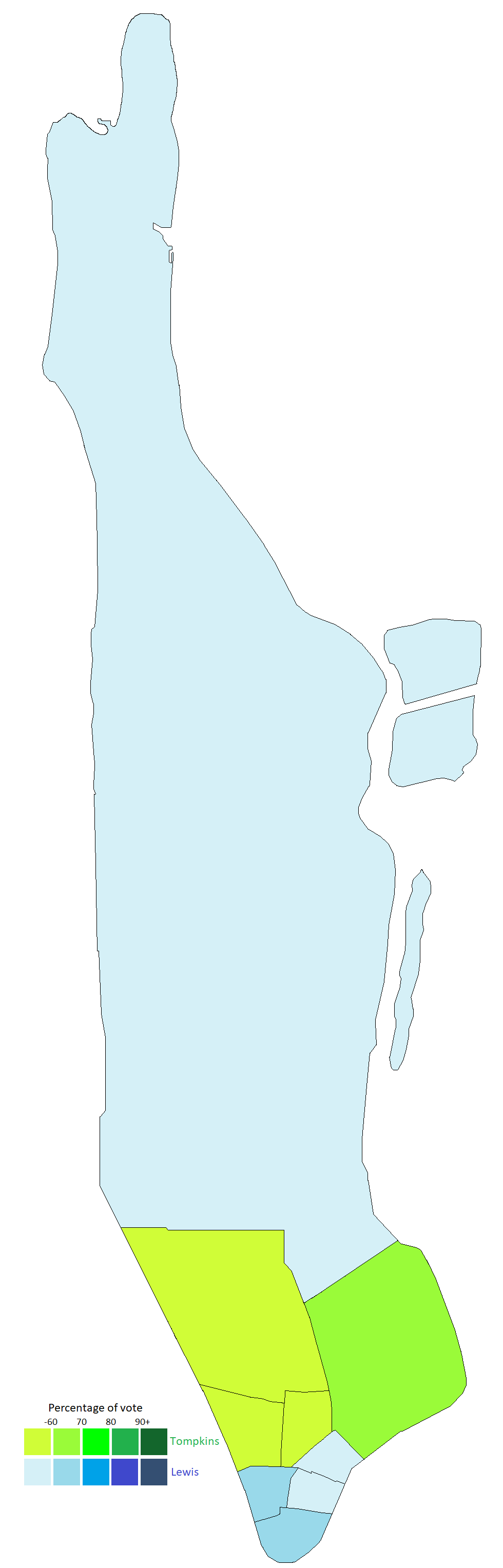
Results by New York City ward

1807 New York gubernatorial election
Party	Candidate	Votes	%
Clinton Republican	Daniel D. Tompkins	35,074	53.09%
Livingston Republican	Morgan Lewis (incumbent)	30,989	46.91%
Total votes		66,063	100%

== See also ==
- New York gubernatorial elections
- New York state elections
