= 1816 New York gubernatorial election =

- April 1816
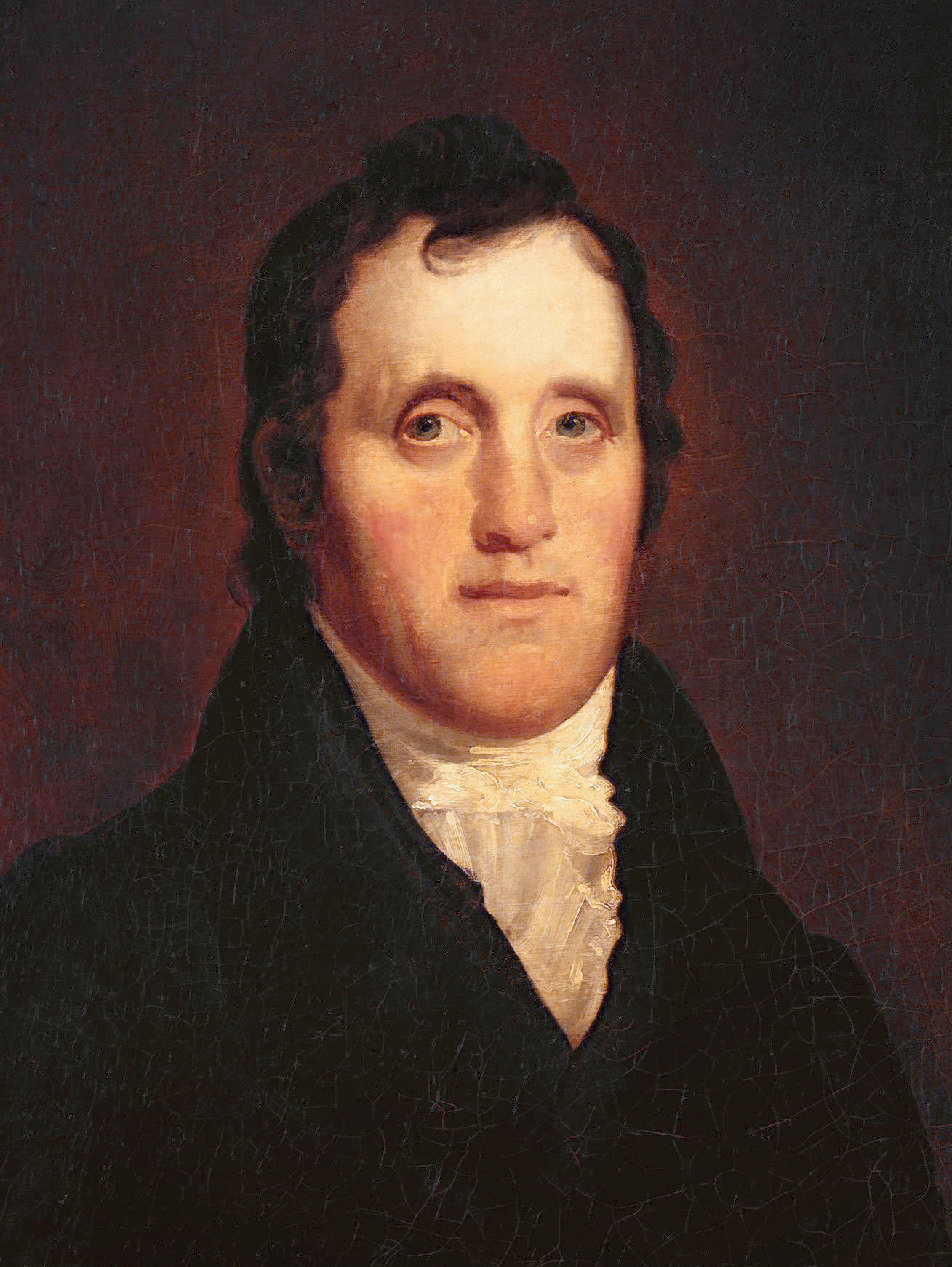

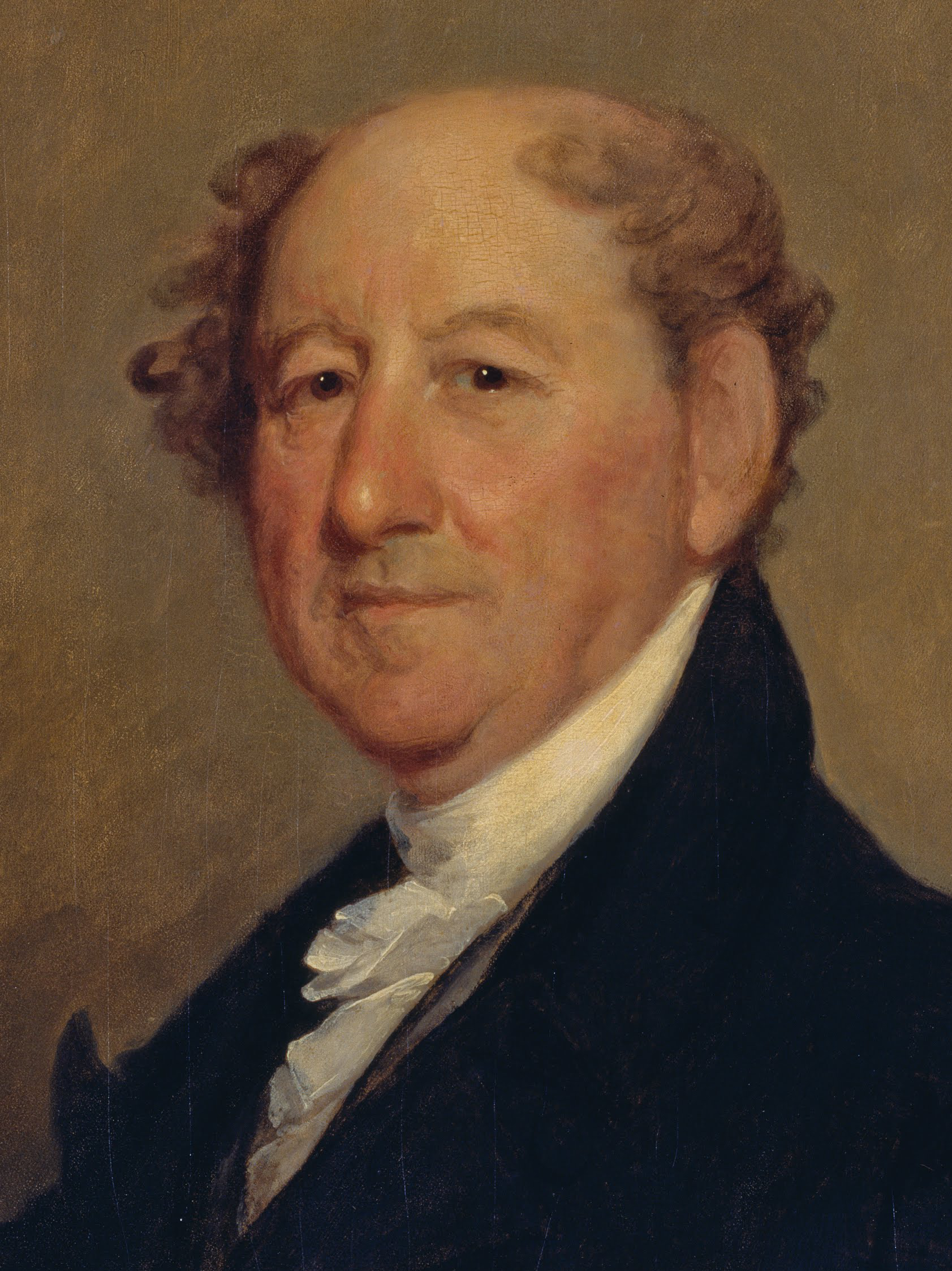
Nominee	Daniel D. Tompkins	Rufus King
Party	Democratic-Republican	Federalist
Popular vote	45,412	38,647
Percentage	54.02%	45.98%
- County results Tompkins: 50–60% 60–70% 70–80% 90–100% King: 50–60% 60–70% 90–100%
Governor before election
Daniel D. Tompkins
Democratic-Republican
Elected Governor
Daniel D. Tompkins
Democratic-Republican

The 1816 New York gubernatorial election was held in April 1816 to elect the Governor and Lieutenant Governor of New York. Governor Tompkins had received the nomination of the Congressional Caucus for Vice President as James Monroe's running-mate. Senator King would receive the votes for President of those Federalist Electors chosen that fall.

== General election ==
=== Candidates ===
- Rufus King, United States Senator and former Minister to the United Kingdom (Federalist)
- Daniel D. Tompkins, incumbent Governor since 1807 (Republican)

=== Results ===
The Democratic-Republican ticket of Tompkins and Tayler was elected.

1816 New York gubernatorial election
Party	Candidate	Votes	%	±%
Democratic-Republican	Daniel D. Tompkins (incumbent)	45,412	54.02%	▲1.85
Federalist	Rufus King	38,647	45.98%	▼1.85
Total votes		84,059	100%	

== See also ==
- New York gubernatorial elections
- New York state elections
