= Daniel D. Tompkins =

Vice President of the United States from 1817 to 1825

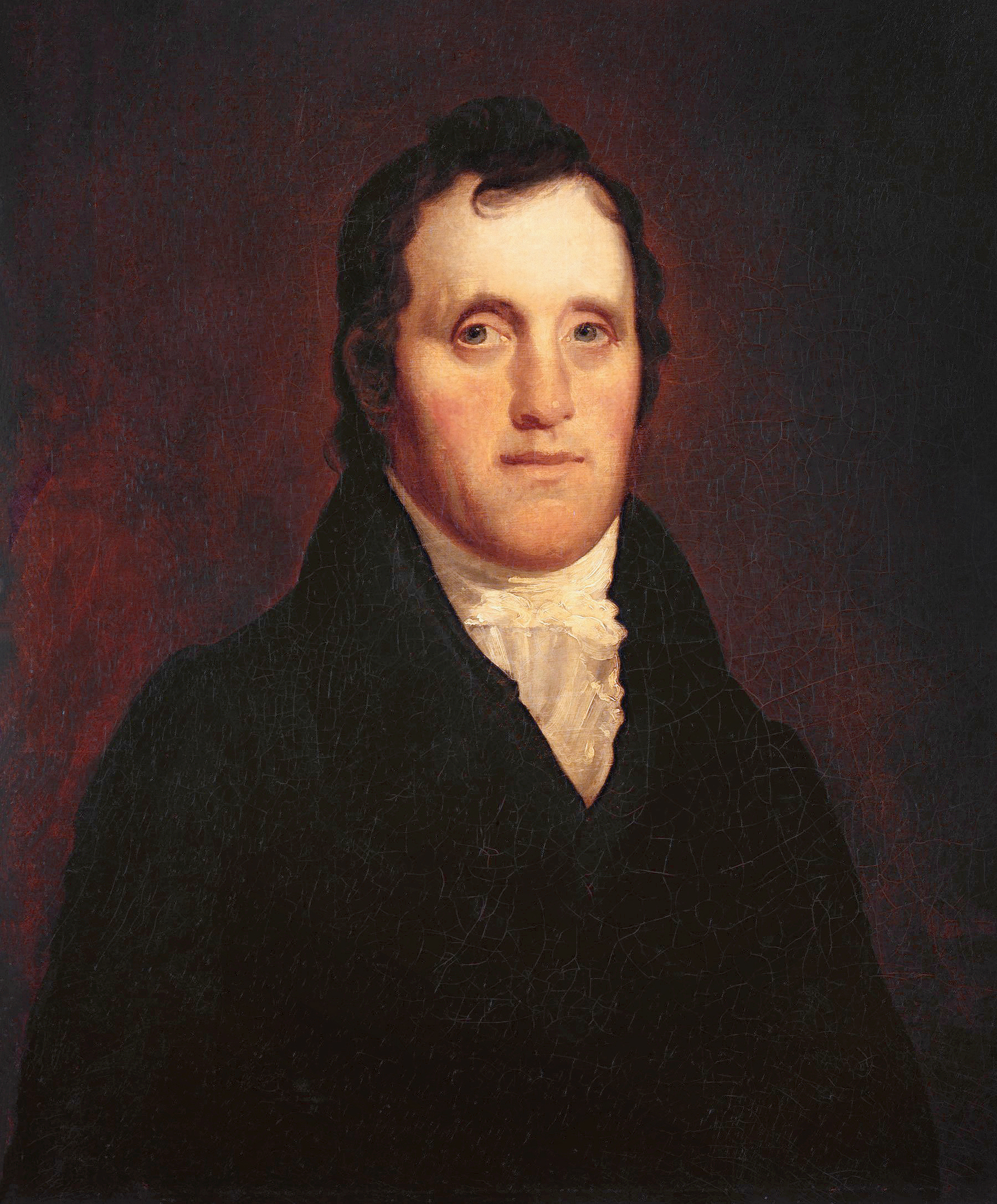
- Portrait by John Wesley Jarvis

6th Vice President of the United States
- In office March 4, 1817 – March 4, 1825
- President: James Monroe
- Preceded by: Elbridge Gerry
- Succeeded by: John C. Calhoun

4th Governor of New York
- In office July 1, 1807 – February 24, 1817
- Lieutenant: John Broome; DeWitt Clinton; John Tayler
- Preceded by: Morgan Lewis
- Succeeded by: John Tayler (acting)

Associate Justice of the New York Supreme Court of Judicature
- In office July 2, 1804 – July 1, 1807
- Succeeded by: William W. Van Ness

Member of the New York State Assembly from New York County
- In office July 1, 1802 – June 30, 1803

Personal details
- Born: Daniel Tompkins; June 21, 1774 Scarsdale, Province of New York, British America
- Died: June 11, 1825 (aged 50) Castleton, Staten Island, New York, U.S.
- Resting place: St. Mark's Church in-the-Bowery
- Party: Democratic-Republican
- Spouse: Hannah Minthorne (m. 1798)
- Children: 8, including Minthorne
- Education: Columbia University (BA)

Daniel D. Tompkins (June 21, 1774 – June 11, 1825) was an American politician who served as the sixth vice president of the United States from 1817 to 1825. He previously served as the fourth governor of New York from 1807 to 1817.

Born in Scarsdale, New York, on June 21, 1774, Tompkins practiced law in New York City after graduating from Columbia College. He was a delegate to the 1801 New York constitutional convention and served on the New York Supreme Court from 1804 to 1807. In 1807, he defeated incumbent Morgan Lewis to become the governor of New York. He held that office from 1807 to 1817, serving for the duration of the War of 1812. During the war, he often spent his own money to equip and pay the militia when the legislature was not in session or would not approve the necessary funds.

Tompkins was the Democratic-Republican Party's vice-presidential nominee in the 1816 presidential election. The ticket of James Monroe and Tompkins easily prevailed over limited Federalist opposition. He served as vice president from 1817 to 1825, and was the only 19th-century vice president to serve two full terms. In 1820, he sought another term as Governor of New York, but was defeated by DeWitt Clinton. After the War of 1812, Tompkins was in poor physical and financial health, the latter condition stemming largely from his spending for the military effort during the war. He fell into alcoholism and was unable to re-establish fiscal solvency despite winning partial reimbursement from the federal government in 1823. He died 99 days after completing a second term and leaving office on June 11, 1825, at the age of 50.

== Name ==
Tompkins was baptized Daniel Tompkins, but added the middle initial "D." either before or during his time as a student at Columbia College. According to his granddaughter, Helen T. Tompkins, this was to distinguish himself from another Daniel Tompkins who was a student there, though records of Columbia College do not list another Daniel Tompkins studying at Columbia at the time. There is controversy as to what the middle initial stood for; some have suggested "Decius". The generally accepted conclusion is that it did not stand for anything and served only to distinguish him from another Daniel Tompkins who perhaps studied with him in primary or secondary school.

== Early life ==
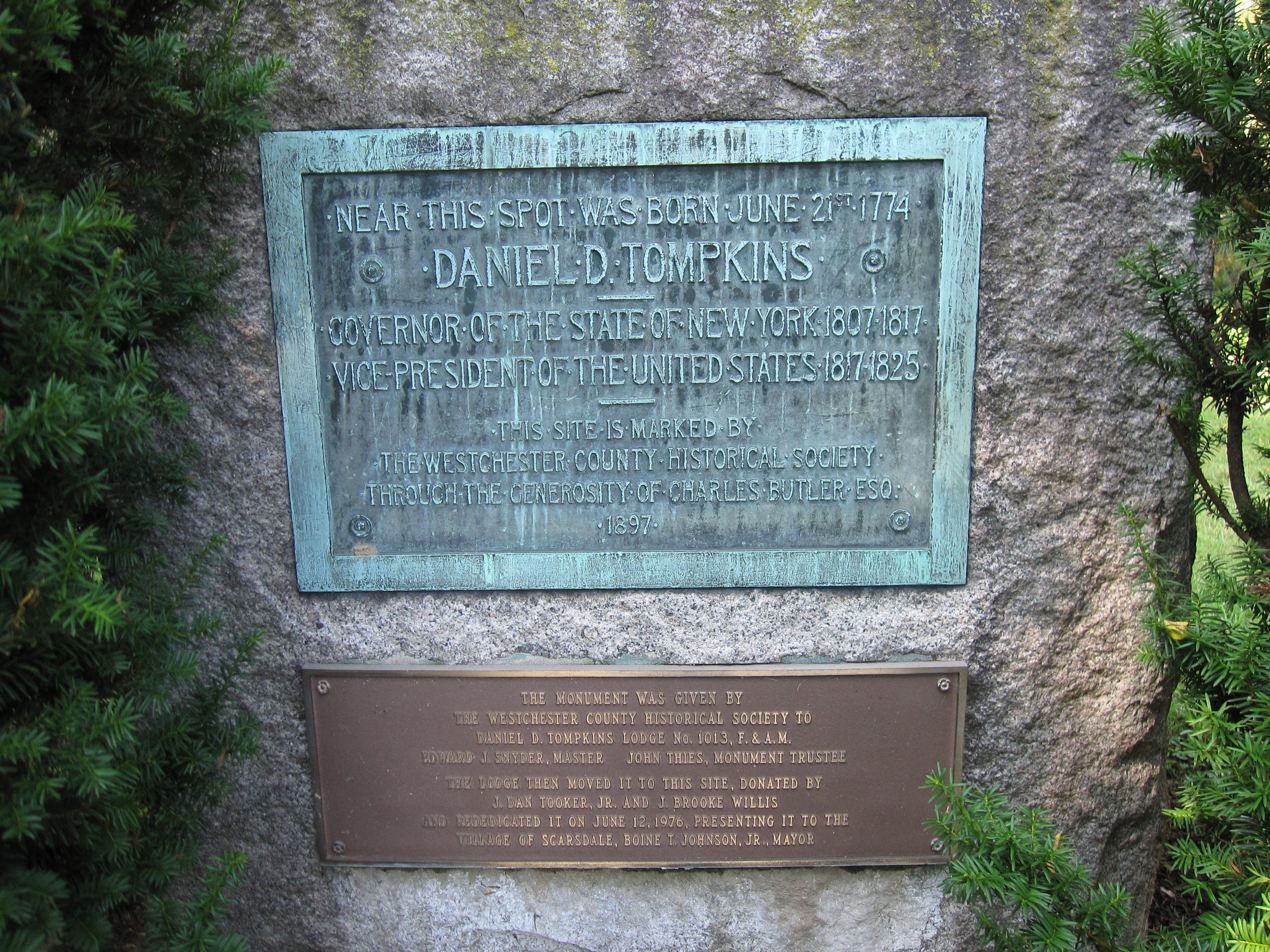
Memorial plaques dedicated to Daniel D. Tompkins in Scarsdale, New York

Daniel D. Tompkins was born on June 21, 1774, in Scarsdale, Westchester County, New York, at his family's estate, Fox Meadow. His parents were Sarah Ann (Hyatt) and Jonathan Griffin Tompkins. His older brother, Caleb Tompkins, was a U.S. Representative from 1817 to 1821. Daniel Tompkins graduated from Columbia College in New York City in 1795, and then studied law with James Kent and Peter Jay Munro. He was admitted to the bar in 1797, and practiced in New York City.

== Political career ==
=== Early years ===
Despite the Federalist leanings of Kent and Munro, Tompkins entered politics as a Democratic-Republican. He was a delegate to the New York State Constitutional Convention in 1801, and a member of the New York State Assembly in 1804. In 1804, he was elected U.S. Representative. He resigned before the beginning of the term to accept, at age 30, an appointment as associate justice of the New York Supreme Court of Judicature, in which capacity he served from 1804 to 1807.

=== Governor ===
On April 30, 1807, Tompkins was elected Governor of New York, defeating incumbent Morgan Lewis – by 35,074 votes to 30,989. He was 33 when elected and is the youngest governor of New York. He was reelected three times: in 1810, defeating Jonas Platt by 43,094 votes to 36,484; in 1813, defeating Stephen Van Rensselaer by 43,324 votes to 39,718; and 1816, defeating Rufus King by 45,412 votes to 38,647. Tompkins was supported by New York mayor DeWitt Clinton in his first run for Governor. But when Clinton challenged President James Madison in the 1812 election, Tompkins broke with Clinton, and supported Madison.

During the War of 1812, Tompkins proved to be one of the most effective war governors. He played an important role in reorganizing the state militia and promoted the formation of a standing state military force based on select conscription. He declined an appointment as United States Secretary of State by President James Madison in 1814, instead accepting appointment as commander of the federal military district that included New York City. Tompkins even financed New York's war effort with money borrowed on his personal credit. But he did not carefully document these very substantial expenditures, and was denied reimbursement.

The Gradual Manumission Act of July 4, 1799 provided for the eventual manumission of slave children born in New York after that date. In 1817, at Tompkins' suggestion, New York enacted emancipation of all slaves, to take effect on July 4, 1827. The "Fifth of July" celebration in New York commemorates the final outcome.

=== Vice presidency (1817–1825) ===
Many New York Democratic-Republicans supported Tompkins for President in the 1816 election, but James Monroe received the party's nomination. Tompkins was instead elected Vice President as Monroe's running mate. Tompkins was re-elected in 1820. He served from March 4, 1817, to March 4, 1825.

When Tompkins became Vice President, he was in poor health, due to a fall from a horse on November 3, 1814. His finances were also quite poor due to his unreimbursed war expenses. He also slipped into alcoholism.

With poor physical and financial health, Tompkins spent much of his vice presidency outside of Washington, D.C., and made for a poor presiding officer of the Senate while it debated the Missouri Compromise in 1820.

Bored and restless in the vice presidency, in April 1820 he ran for Governor of New York against incumbent DeWitt Clinton. Tompkins lost narrowly, 45,900 votes to 47,447, but was re-elected vice president with Monroe. He was a delegate to the 1821 New York State Constitutional Convention, serving as its president.

In 1823, Tompkins finally won compensation from the federal government, but he continued to drink heavily and was unable to resolve his business affairs.

== Developer ==
in 1815, Tompkins purchased the Van Buskirk Farm in New Brighton and property on Grymes Hill on the northeastern shore of Staten Island. There he established a settlement named Tompkinsville. His main residence was located on Fort Hill in Tompkinsville; it burned down in 1874. Minthorne Street Hannah Street, and Westervelt Avenue in Tompkinsville are named for his son, daughter, and son-in-law.

He built a dock in the neighborhood in 1817 and offered daily ferry service between Staten Island and Manhattan. In 1816 he acquired additional land from the Church of St. Andrew, but his financial troubles later led the church to foreclose. The Westervelts then bought the property, which they later divided into many lots to sell off.

== Personal life ==
On February 20, 1798, Daniel Tompkins, 23, married 16-year-old Hannah Minthorne, the daughter of Mangle Minthorne, an assistant alderman of New York City. The couple had eight children, including Arietta Minthorn Tompkins (born July 31, 1800), who married a son of Smith Thompson in 1818; Hannah, wife of Dr. John S. Westervelt; and (Mangle) Minthorne Tompkins (December 26, 1807 – June 5, 1881), who was the Free Soil Party candidate for Governor of New York in 1852. Hannah and Minthorne were named after their mother. The Tompkinses also fostered young orphan Henry Brewerton (1801–1879). Brewerton attended the United States Military Academy at West Point, and served as an Army engineer officer from 1819 to 1867.

Hannah was ill in the year before her husband became Vice President, and did not attend his inauguration. She survived him by nearly four years in Tompkinsville.

=== Freemasonry ===
Apart from his political career, Tompkins was an active Freemason throughout his life. He was a member of Hiram Lodge 72, Mount Pleasant, New York and became Grand Master of the Grand Lodge of New York from 1820 to 1822. The Daniel D. Tompkins Memorial Chapel at the Masonic Home in Utica, New York, was built in his honor in 1911. The Grand Lodge of New York celebrated the centennial of the chapel on June 25, 2011.

He also served as the first Sovereign Grand Commander of the Northern Masonic Jurisdiction Scottish Rite, a branch of Freemasonry. Tompkins served in this capacity from 1813 to 1825, although he did not devote much time to the newly formed group.

== Death ==
Tompkins died in Tompkinsville on Staten Island, on June 11, 1825, 10 days before his 51st birthday. He was interred in the Minthorne vault in the west yard of St. Mark's Church in-the-Bowery, New York City, as was his wife. His post-vice presidency lifespan is the shortest of any Vice President, and he also lived the shortest life of any now-deceased Vice President. He was the youngest Vice President until John C. Breckinridge in 1857 at 36. He was the only 19th-century Vice President to serve two terms under the same President, and two full terms at all.

== Legacy ==
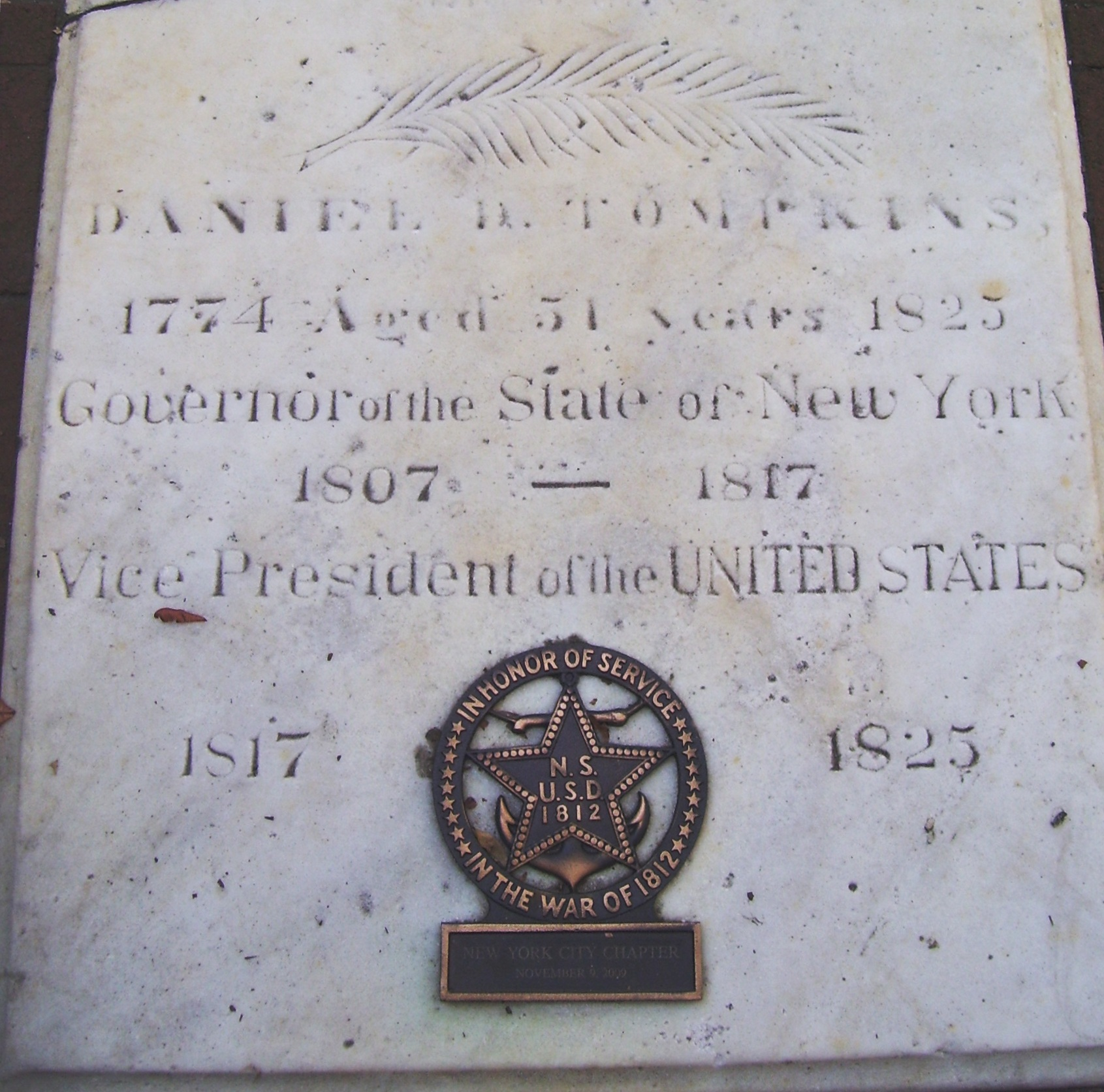
The cover to the vault in which Tompkins' remains were interred

The Tompkinsville neighborhood of Staten Island is named for Tompkins, and streets in that neighborhood are named for his children. Tompkins Masonic Lodge #471 in that same section of Staten Island is also named for him. Tompkins is credited with being one of the founding members of the Brighton Heights Reformed Church on Staten Island. The church was founded in 1823, during his term as vice president. Its first meeting place was in New York Marine Hospital (then known as the Quarantine), a predecessor of the immigration facility on Ellis Island.

Four forts in New York State in the War of 1812 were named for Governor Tompkins, in Staten Island, Sackets Harbor, Buffalo, and Plattsburgh.

Tompkins Park in Bedford Stuyvesant, Brooklyn, New York (now called Herbert Von King Park) was named after Tompkins. The nearby Tompkins Avenue and Tompkins Public Houses are likewise named.

Tompkins County in New York, Tompkins Square Park in Manhattan, Public School 69 Daniel D. Tompkins School in Staten Island, and the Town of Tompkins are named after him, as is Tompkins Road, running between Post Road (NY-22) and Fenimore Road in Scarsdale, New York.

Tompkinsville, Kentucky, is named for Tompkins. It is the county seat of Monroe County, Kentucky, which is named for the President under whom Tompkins served as Vice President.

Tompkins was mentioned by Kris Kringle in the 1947 film Miracle on 34th Street. The screenplay was incorrect, however, in that Kringle mentions that Tompkins served as vice president under John Quincy Adams when Adams's vice president was actually John C. Calhoun. Tompkins was the sixth vice president and Adams was the sixth president, leading to confusion in the script.

American actor and producer Richard Kollmar, husband of columnist and TV personality Dorothy Kilgallen, was a great-great-grandchild of Tompkins.

Party political offices
Preceded by Morgan Lewis	Democratic-Republican nominee for Governor of New York; 1807, 1810, 1813, 1816	Succeeded by DeWitt Clinton
Preceded by Elbridge Gerry	Democratic-Republican nominee for Vice President of the United States; 1816, 1820	Succeeded by John C. Calhoun; Albert Gallatin (withdrew); Nathan Sanford¹
First	Bucktails nominee for Governor of New York; 1820	Succeeded by Samuel Young
Political offices
Preceded by Morgan Lewis	Governor of New York; 1807–1817	Succeeded by John Tayler; Acting
Preceded by Elbridge Gerry	Vice President of the United States; 1817–1825	Succeeded by John C. Calhoun
Academic offices
Preceded by Morgan Lewis	Chancellor of the University of the State of New York; 1808–1817	Succeeded by John Tayler
Notes and references
1. The Democratic-Republican Party split in the 1824 election, fielding four separate candidates.
