= 1820 United States presidential election in Vermont =

- November 1 – December 6, 1820
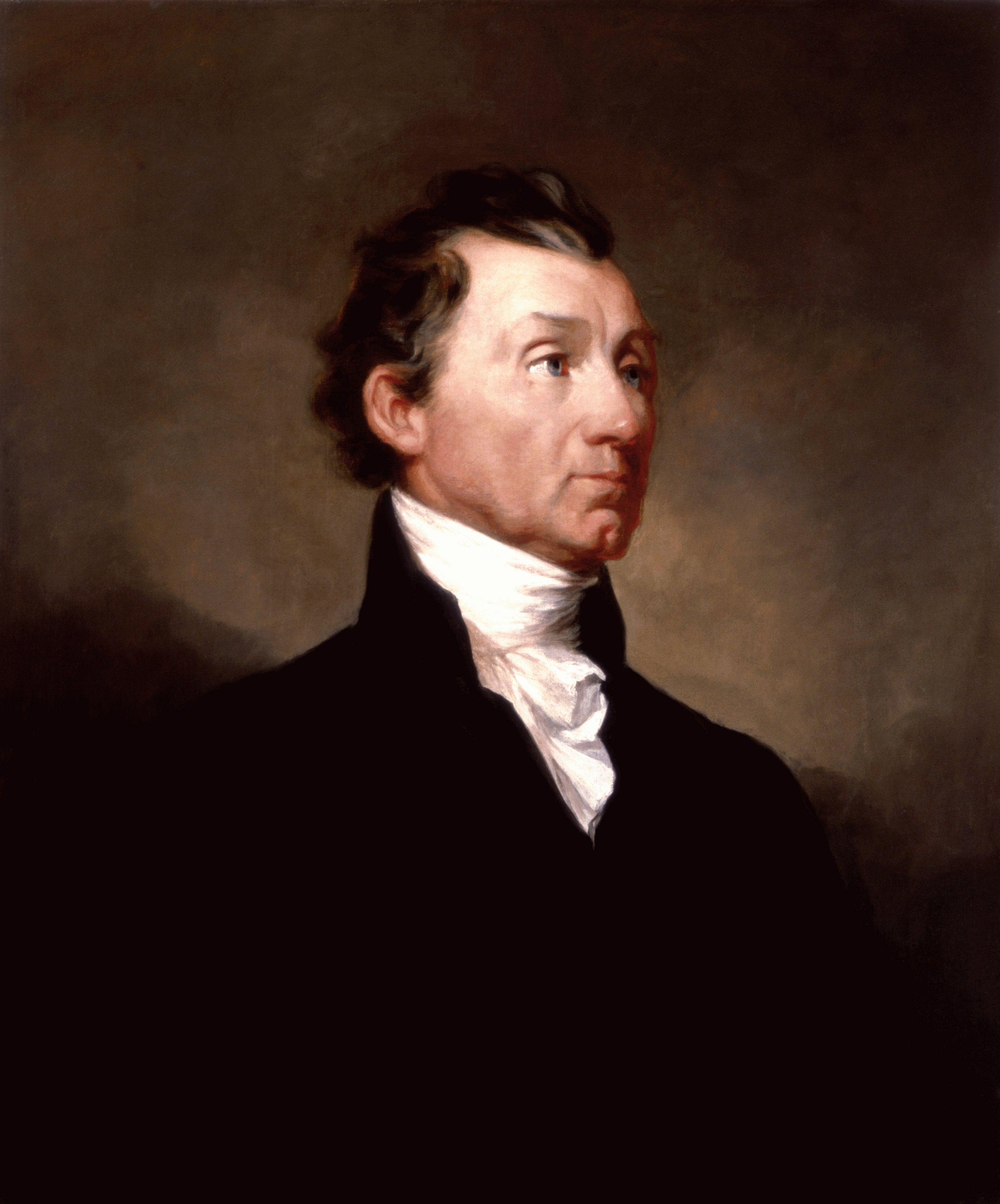
Nominee	James Monroe
Party	Democratic-Republican
Home state	Virginia
Running mate	Daniel D. Tompkins
Electoral vote	8
Percentage	100%
President before election
James Monroe
Democratic-Republican
Elected President
James Monroe
Democratic-Republican

The 1820 United States presidential election in Vermont took place between November 1 to December 6, 1820, as part of the 1820 United States presidential election. The state legislature chose eight representatives, or electors to the Electoral College, who voted for President and Vice President.

During this election, Vermont cast its eight electoral votes to Democratic Republican candidate and incumbent President James Monroe.

Effectively, the 1820 presidential election was an election with no campaign, since there was no serious opposition to Monroe and Tompkins. In fact, they won all the electoral votes barring one from neighboring New Hampshire, which was cast for Secretary of State John Quincy Adams.

== See also ==
- United States presidential elections in Vermont
