= 1820 United States presidential election =

Re-election of James Monroe

- November 1 – December 6, 1820

235 members (Note: Including 3 electoral votes from Missouri. Missouri statehood was disputed at the time of the election; during the joint session of the United States Congress, the final electoral count was read twice, once with Missouri's votes included and once without.) of the Electoral College 118 electoral votes needed to win
- Turnout: 10.1% (▼6.8 pp)
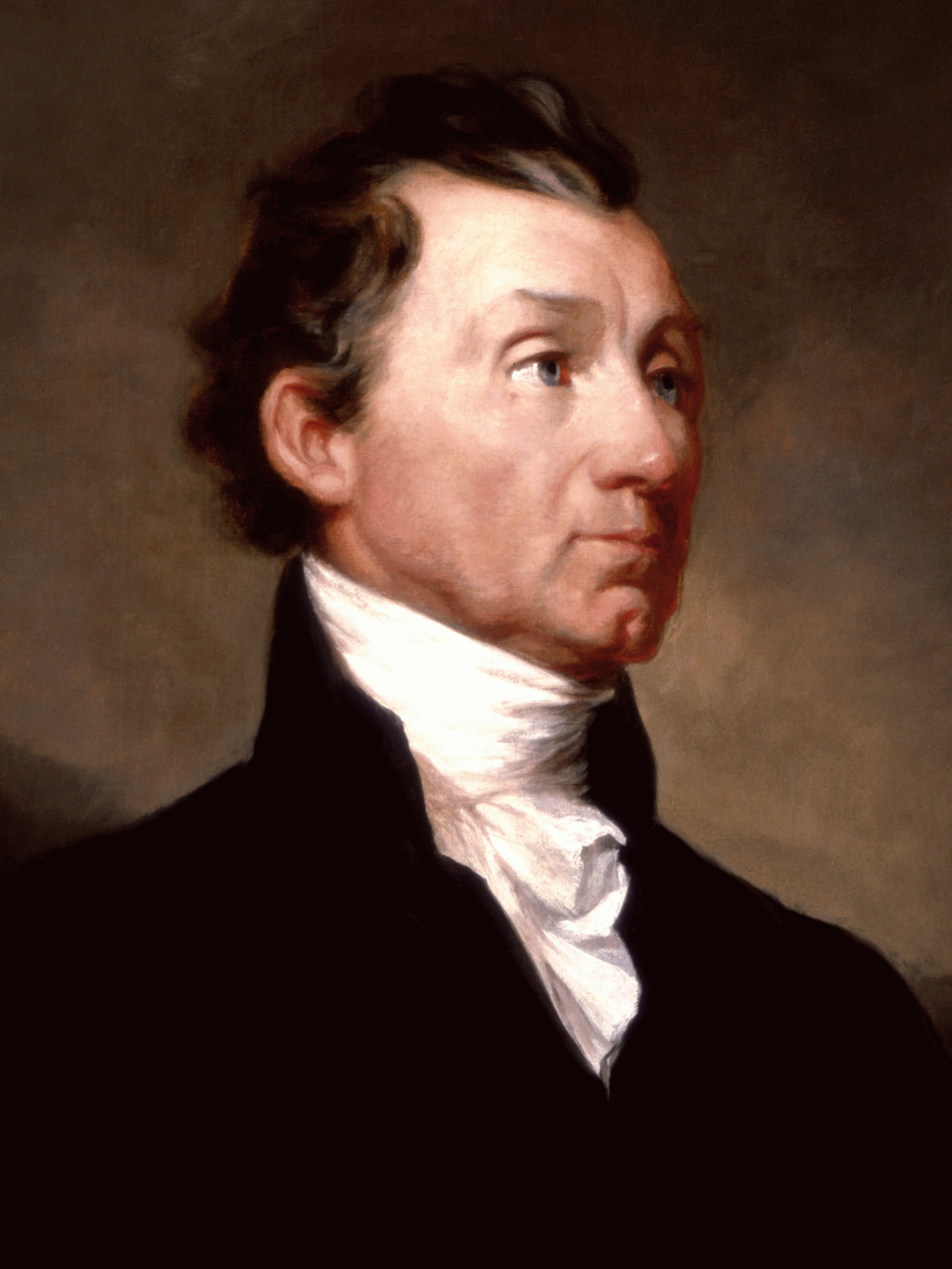
Nominee	James Monroe
Party	Democratic-Republican
Home state	Virginia
Running mate	Daniel D. Tompkins
Electoral vote	228 (+3 disputed) (Note: Including 14 electoral votes from Federalists representing Delaware, Kentucky, Maryland, and Massachusetts.) (Note: Monroe earned 235 pledged electoral votes, including those of Missouri, but received 231 votes due to the deaths of single electors from Mississippi, Pennsylvania, and Tennessee, and the faithless electoral vote of New Hampshire's William Plumer.)
States carried	23 (+1 disputed)
Popular vote	85,443
Percentage	78.34%
- Presidential election results map. Green denotes states won by Monroe/Tompkins and Light Green denotes New Hampshire elector William Plumer's vote for John Quincy Adams. Numbers indicate the number of electoral votes cast by each state.
President before election
James Monroe
Democratic-Republican
Elected President
James Monroe
Democratic-Republican

A presidential election was held in the United States from November 1 to December 6, 1820. Taking place at the height of the Era of Good Feelings, the election saw incumbent Democratic-Republican President James Monroe win reelection without a major opponent. It was the third and the most recent United States presidential election in which a presidential candidate ran effectively unopposed.

Monroe and Vice President Daniel D. Tompkins faced little to no opposition from other Democratic-Republicans in their quest for a second term. The Federalist Party had fielded a presidential candidate in each election since 1796, but the party's already-waning popularity had declined further following the War of 1812. Although able to field a nominee for vice president, the Federalists could not put forward a presidential candidate, leaving Monroe without organized opposition.

Monroe won every state and received all but one of the electoral votes. Secretary of State John Quincy Adams received the only other electoral vote, which came from faithless elector William Plumer. Nine different Federalists received electoral votes for vice president, but Tompkins won re-election by a large margin. No other post-Twelfth Amendment presidential candidate has matched Monroe's electoral vote share. Monroe and George Washington remain the only presidential candidates to run without any major opposition. Monroe's victory was the last of six straight victories by Virginians in presidential elections (Jefferson twice, Madison twice, and Monroe twice). This was the last election in which an incumbent ticket was reelected until the ticket of Woodrow Wilson and Thomas R. Marshall were reelected in 1916, and the first time the incumbent president and vice-president were simultaneously reelected since George Washington and John Adams (who did not run as a ticket) in 1792.

== Background ==
Despite the continuation of single-party politics (known in this case as the Era of Good Feelings), serious issues emerged during the election in 1820. The nation had endured a widespread depression following the Panic of 1819 and momentous disagreement about the extension of slavery into the territories was taking center stage. Nevertheless, James Monroe faced no opposition party or candidate in his re-election bid, although he did not receive all of the electoral votes (see below).

Massachusetts was entitled to 22 electoral votes in 1816, but cast only 15 in 1820 because of the Missouri Compromise of 1820, which made the region of Maine, long part of Massachusetts, a free state to balance the pending admission of slave state Missouri. In addition, Pennsylvania, Tennessee, and Mississippi also cast one fewer electoral vote than they were entitled to, as one elector from each state died before the electoral meeting. Consequently, this meant that Mississippi cast only two votes when any state is always entitled to a minimum of three. This is one of only three times a state or district has cast under the minimum of three electoral votes, the others being Nevada in 1864 and the District of Columbia in 2000. In the case of the former, an elector was snowbound and there was no law to replace him (Nevada had only become a state that year). In that of the latter, a faithless elector abstained from voting.

Alabama, Illinois, Maine, Mississippi, and Missouri participated in their first presidential election in 1820, Missouri came with controversy since it was not yet officially a state (see below). No new states would participate in American presidential elections until 1836, after the admission to the Union of Arkansas in 1836 and Michigan in 1837 (after the main voting, but before the counting of the electoral vote in Congress).

== Nominations ==
=== Democratic-Republican Party nomination ===
Democratic-Republican Party 1820 Democratic-Republican Party Ticket
James Monroe	Daniel D. Tompkins
for President	for Vice President
5th President of the United States (1817–1825)	6th Vice President of the United States (1817–1825)

Only fifty of the one hundred ninety-one Democratic-Republican members of the United States Congress attended the nominating caucus and they unanimously voted to not make a nomination as it would be unnecessary to do so. Monroe and Tompkins ran with the support of the Democratic-Republican Party despite not being formally nominated.

== General election ==
=== Campaign ===
Monroe's re-election in 1820, while notable for its broad support, was not without opposition nor did there exist a unanimity of sentiment in favor of President Monroe. Complaints of Monroe's administration included his opposition to federal funds in constructing internal improvements, his failure to advocate a substantial increase in the tariff, his failure to champion the cause of the South in the Missouri Controversy, and his failure to champion the cause of the North in the Missouri Controversy.

Despite these criticisms, Monroe received backing from both Democratic-Republican and Federalist elector candidates in most states. In many cases, rival Democratic-Republicans vied for the privilege of casting their electoral vote for Monroe. True opposition to Monroe's presidency only emerged in New York and Pennsylvania where New York Governor DeWitt Clinton was supported as an alternative presidential candidate.

==== Federal funding ====
Monroe's opposition to federal funds in constructing internal improvements and his apparent neutrality on the tariff issue were especially displeasing to Kentucky and the Middle Atlantic states. In early 1819, the Kentucky Gazette vigorously endorsed the idea of federal internal improvements, condemning Monroe for his position on the issue. Later, commenting on Monroe's pending visit to Lexington, the Kentucky Gazette said:

It is hoped the president will remain with us long enough to examine the state of our factories. They will present to him a different aspect from that which they wore, when he was here in 1808. If their fallen state should produce any impression, it is possible, through the agency of the chief magistrate, that the government will take some steps to encourage domestic manufactures.

After Monroe's visit, the Gazette, once more returning to the issue of internal improvements, noted that the President had been emphatically told during his stay in Kentucky that the people of the state were not in sympathy with his position on that question.

Opposition to Monroe on the issue was also present in New York where the Clintonian faction of the Democratic-Republicans deeply resented Monroe on the matter with Governor Clinton even expressing disappointment as early as 1817. The two men were not on friendly terms since the latter's campaign against the party in the 1812 presidential election. This conflict openly erupted after the Clintonians accused the Monroe administration of using patronage to defeat Clinton in his campaign for re-election. When it came to the time of choosing electors, the Bucktail faction of the Democratic-Republicans, which was loyal to Monroe, and the Clintonians ran rival tickets. Newspapers referred to the former as the "slave ticket" and the latter as the "anti-slave ticket". Ultimately, the Clintonian faction lost, with the legislature voting 89 for the Bucktail ticket, 53 for the Clintonian ticket, and 1 not voting. The Columbian, the Clintonian organ in New York City, claimed that its candidates would have voted for Monroe had they won. However, it is likely that some would have supported Clinton instead.

==== Tariff policy ====
It was in Pennsylvania that the greatest criticism of Monroe's tariff policy, or lack of a tariff policy, was encountered and where the most spirited opposition to Monroe existed. The Panic of 1819, with its disastrous effects on many factories in the state, produced a strong demand for higher protective tariffs. A public meeting held in Philadelphia in August 1819 declared that it would vote for no one for public office who was known to be unfriendly to the principle of tariff protection. This opposition to Monroe was spearheaded by William Duane and his newspaper the Philadelphia Auror. Duane, though a Democratic-Republican, had been for years a severe critic of both the state and national leadership of the party. In 1820 the Aurora's anonymous correspondent, BRUTUS (suspected to be Duane himself), began to denounce Monroe as the champion of slavery, blamed him for causing the defeat of the tariff bill of 1820, blamed him for discouraging internal improvements, and accused him of championing the cause of the national bank, favoring the caucus system, and even encouraging the Supreme Court to render corrupt decisions.

On October 21, a public meeting was held in Philadelphia to nominate anti-Monroe electoral candidates. The meeting was contentious, with the Pro-Monroe Philadelphia Democratic Press and the Aurora offering conflicting accounts. The Democratic Press claimed that Monroe supporters were so numerous at the State House's Mayor's Court Room that the opposition had to move to Overholt's Tavern. In contrast, the Aurora described the meeting, which was said to have been largely made up of Quakers, as impressive but disrupted by unruly Monroe supporters, leading many Quakers to withdraw in dismay as they were not accustomed to such turmoil.

The newly formed anti-Monroe ticket pledged support for Clinton as president and campaigned briefly in Philadelphia, though the rest of the state remained largely indifferent. The Aurora vehemently attacked Monroe as a candidate who supported slavery and urged Pennsylvania to break from their vassalage to the "slave aristocracy." On the eve of the election, BRUTUS (the anonymous source mentioned above) denounced Monroe as an enemy of internal improvements and domestic manufacturing, while praising Governor Clinton's support for these initiatives.

When the election returns were counted it was found that Monroe had received 1,233 votes in Philadelphia to 793 for Clinton. Elsewhere in Pennsylvania, Clinton's support was minimal, with only Fayette County breaking 10% of the vote for Clinton electors.

==== Missouri Compromise and Virginia ====
Unexpected opposition to Monroe came from his very own state of Virginia. In February 1820, when the Virginia legislative caucus met to nominate presidential electors just as the Missouri Compromise was being finalized, it was clear that Monroe would not veto the compromise as it was seen as the only peaceful solution to the slavery issue within the Union. However, while Northern moderates urged Monroe to accept the compromise, Virginia Democratic-Republicans, led by the Richmond Enquirer, demanded that the South resist any restrictions on slavery in Missouri or other territories. As such, the Virginia caucus was dismayed to hear rumors that Monroe supported a compromise allowing slavery in Missouri but prohibiting it in the Louisiana Territory above the Parallel 36°30′ north. Angered, the caucus adjourned without making nominations. Virginians, including Henry St. George Tucker, wrote furious letters to Washington, condemning the compromise and expressing their unwillingness to support Monroe if it meant sacrificing Southern rights (i.e. slavery). Monroe, usually mild-mannered, grew indignant at these criticisms. He wrote to his son-in-law, George Hay, emphasizing that principles were more important than expediency and suggesting that if the legislators preferred another candidate, they should say so. Instead, the caucus reconvened on February 17 and nominated Monroe supporters for the electoral college, likely realizing their earlier mistake. Hay selectively shared favorable letters from Monroe with the caucus, hinting at a possible compromise. Eventually, Monroe approved the Missouri Compromise, despite earlier considering a veto.

=== Disputes ===
On March 9, 1820, Congress had passed a law directing Missouri to hold a convention to form a constitution and a state government. This law stated that "the said state, when formed, shall be admitted into the Union, upon an equal footing with the original states, in all respects whatsoever." However, when Congress reconvened in November 1820, the admission of Missouri became an issue of contention. Proponents claimed that Missouri had fulfilled the conditions of the law and therefore was a state; detractors contended that certain provisions of the Missouri Constitution violated the United States Constitution.

By the time Congress was due to meet to count the electoral votes from the election, this dispute had lasted over two months. The counting raised a problem: if Congress counted Missouri's votes, that would count as recognition that Missouri was a state; on the other hand, if Congress failed to count Missouri's vote, it would count as recognition that Missouri was not a state. Knowing ahead of time that Monroe had won in a landslide and that Missouri's vote would therefore make no difference in the final result, the Senate passed a resolution on February 13, 1821, stating that if a protest were made, there would be no consideration of the matter unless the vote of Missouri would change who would become president. Instead, the President of the Senate would announce the final tally twice, once with Missouri included and once with it excluded.

The next day this resolution was introduced in the full House. After a lively debate, it was passed. Nonetheless, during the counting of the electoral votes on February 14, 1821, an objection was raised to the votes from Missouri by Representative Arthur Livermore of New Hampshire. He argued that since Missouri had not yet officially become a state, it had no right to cast any electoral votes. Immediately, Representative John Floyd of Virginia argued that Missouri's votes must be counted. Chaos ensued, and order was restored only with the counting of the vote as per the resolution and then adjournment for the day.

== Results ==
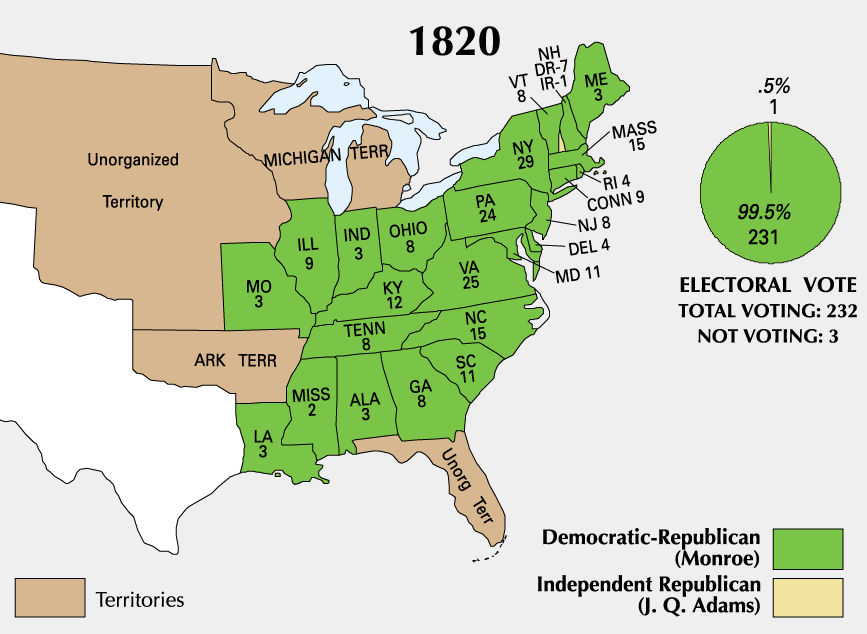

Upon his re-election in 1820, Monroe became the third consecutive president to be elected to a second term (after his immediate predecessors Thomas Jefferson and James Madison). This only happened once after, when Barack Obama was re-elected in 2012, after Bill Clinton and George W. Bush had served two terms each.

=== Popular vote ===
The Federalists received a small amount of the popular vote despite having no electoral candidates. Even in Massachusetts, where the Federalist slate of electors was victorious, the electors cast all of their votes for Monroe. This was the first election in which the Democratic-Republicans won in Connecticut and Delaware.

Presidential candidate	Party	Home state	Popular vote^{(a)}		Electoral vote
Presidential candidate	Party	Home state	Count	Percentage	Electoral vote
James Monroe (incumbent)	Democratic-Republican	Virginia	85,443	78.34%	231^{(c)}
No candidate	Federalist	N/A	20,660	18.94%	0
DeWitt Clinton	Democratic-Republican	New York	1,893	1.74%	0
Unpledged electors	None	N/A	1,066	0.98%	0
John Quincy Adams	Democratic-Republican	Massachusetts	N/A	N/A	1
Total			109,062	100.0%	232^{(c)}
Needed to win					117^{(d)}

Source (Electoral Vote): "Electoral College Box Scores 1789–1996". National Archives and Records Administration.

Source (Popular Vote): A New Nation Votes: American Election Returns 1787-1825

^{(a)} Only 15 of the 24 states chose electors by popular vote.
^{(b)} Adams received his vote from a faithless elector.
^{(c)} There was a dispute as to whether Missouri's electoral votes were valid, due to the timing of its assumption of statehood. The first figure excludes Missouri's votes and the second figure includes them.
^{(d)} Electors were elected to all 235 apportioned positions; however, three electors (from Mississippi, Pennsylvania and Tennessee) pledged to the Monroe/Tompkins ticket died before the Electoral College convened and were not replaced, bringing the total number of electoral votes cast to 232 respectively.

=== Electoral vote ===
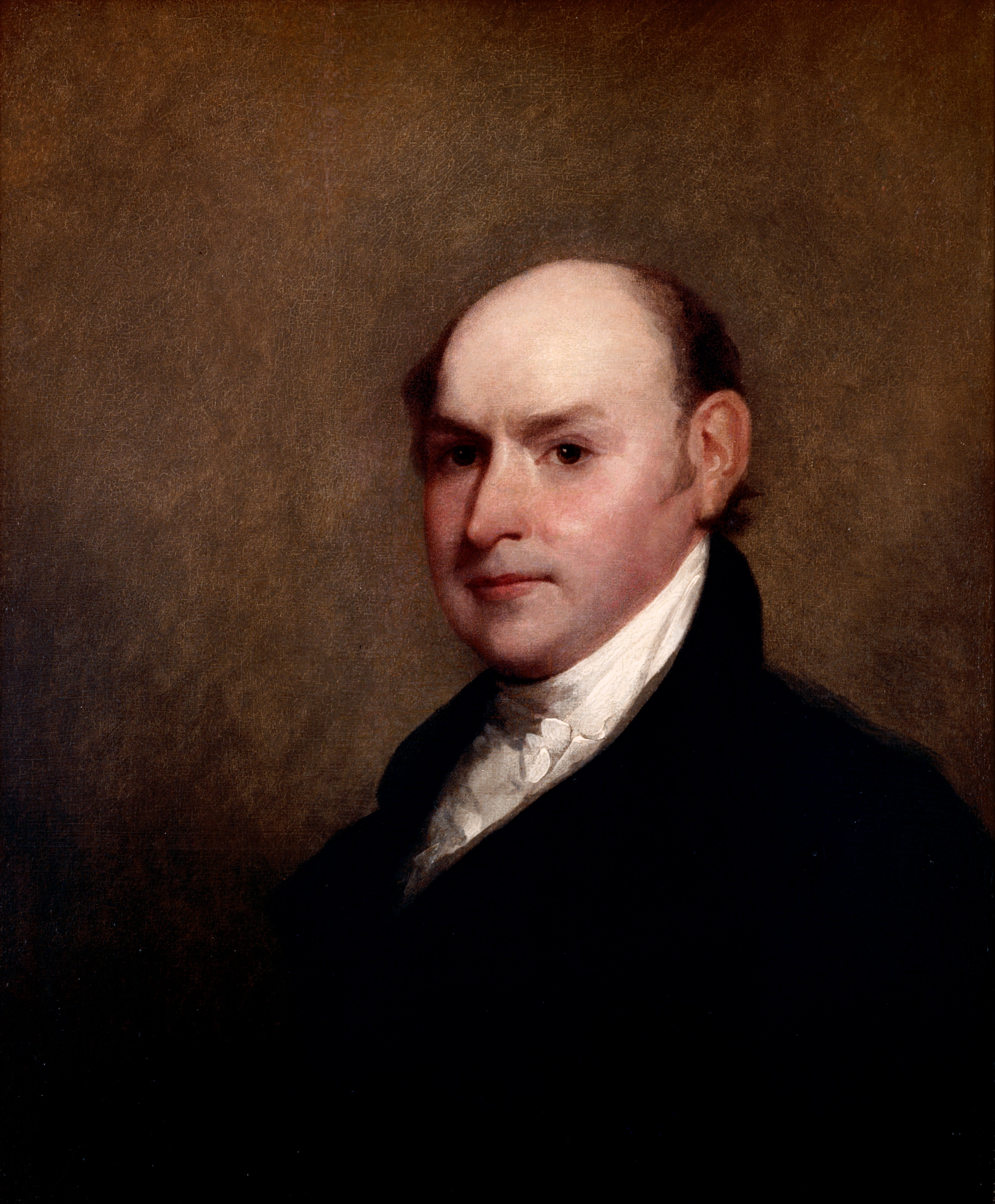
John Quincy Adams (pictured here in 1818) received a single electoral vote from William Plumer.

The sole electoral vote against Monroe came from William Plumer, an elector from New Hampshire and former United States senator and New Hampshire governor. Plumer cast his electoral ballot for Secretary of State John Quincy Adams. Everett S. Brown, a political scientist, noted that Plumer had asked his son, William Plumer Jr., to see if Adams had objections to Plumer casting his vote for him. While legend has it this was to ensure that George Washington would remain the only American president unanimously chosen by the Electoral College, that was not Plumer's goal. In fact, Plumer simply thought that Monroe was a mediocre president and that Adams would be a better one. Plumer also refused to vote for Tompkins for Vice President as "grossly intemperate", not having "that weight of character which his office requires," and "because he grossly neglected his duty" in his "only" official role as President of the Senate by being "absent nearly three-fourths of the time"; Plumer ultimately voted for Adams for president and Richard Rush for vice president; in doing so, Plumer unwittingly prefigured the National Republican ticket that Adams and Rush would run on together in 1828. In response to Plumer's vote, Adams felt "surprise and mortification", and that Plumer's vote was an affront to the Monroe administration.

Even though every member of the Electoral College was pledged to Monroe, there were still a number of Federalist electors who voted for a Federalist vice president rather than Monroe's running mate Daniel D. Tompkins: those for Richard Stockton came from Massachusetts, while the entire Delaware delegation voted for Daniel Rodney for vice president, and Robert Goodloe Harper's vice presidential vote was cast by an elector from his home state of Maryland. In any case, these breaks in ranks were not enough to deny Tompkins a substantial electoral college victory.

Monroe's share of the electoral vote has not been exceeded by any candidate since, with the closest competition coming from Franklin D. Roosevelt's landslide 1936 victory.

Only Washington, who won the vote of each presidential elector in the 1789 and 1792 presidential elections, can claim to have swept the Electoral College.

Vice presidential candidate	Party	State	Electoral vote
Daniel D. Tompkins	Democratic-Republican	New York	218^{(a)}
Richard Stockton	Federalist	New Jersey	8^{(b)}
Daniel Rodney	Federalist	Delaware	4^{(b)}
Robert Goodloe Harper	Federalist	Maryland	1^{(b)}
Richard Rush	Federalist	Pennsylvania	1^{(b)}
Total			232^{(a)}
Needed to win			117^{(c)}

Source: "Electoral College Box Scores 1789–1996". National Archives and Records Administration.

^{(a)} There was a dispute over the validity of Missouri's electoral votes, due to the timing of its assumption of statehood. The first figure excludes Missouri's votes and the second figure includes them.
^{(b)} These votes are from electors who voted for a Federalist vice president rather than Monroe's running mate Daniel D. Tompkins; combined, these votes represent only 5.6% of the electoral vote.
^{(c)} Electors were elected to all 235 apportioned positions; however, three electors (from Mississippi, Pennsylvania and Tennessee) pledged to the Monroe/Tompkins ticket died before the Electoral College convened and were not replaced, bringing the total number of electoral votes cast to 229 or 232 respectively.

Popular vote
Monroe	78.34%
No candidate	18.94%
Clinton	1.74%
Unpledged electors	0.98%

Electoral vote (presidential)
Monroe	98.3%
Adams	0.4%
Unpledged electors	1.3%

Electoral vote (vice presidential)
Tompkins	92.8%
Stockton	3.4%
Rodney	1.7%
Harper	0.4%
Rush	0.4%
Unpledged electors	1.3%

=== Maps ===
Electoral College map (president)

Electoral College map (vice president)

Map of presidential election results by county, shaded according to winning party's percentage of the vote

== Results by state ==
Elections in this period were vastly different from modern-day presidential elections. The actual presidential candidates were rarely mentioned on tickets and voters were voting for particular electors who were pledged to a particular candidate. There was sometimes confusion as to who a particular elector was actually pledged to. Results are reported as the highest result for an elector for any given candidate. For example, if three Monroe electors received 100, 50, and 25 votes, Monroe would be recorded as having 100 votes. Confusion surrounding the way results are reported may lead to discrepancies between the sum of all state results and national results.

In Massachusetts, Federalist electors won 62.06% of the vote. However, only 7,902 of these votes went to Federalist electors who did not cast their votes for Monroe (this being most likely because these Federalist electors lost). Similarly, In Kentucky, 1,941 ballots were cast for an elector labelled as Federalist who proceeded to vote for Monroe. All of the Federalist Monroe votes have been placed in the Federalist column, as the Federalist party fielded no presidential candidate and therefore it is likely these electors simply cast their votes for Monroe because the overwhelming majority he achieved made their votes irrelevant.

The popular votes in District 1 in Kentucky and in 6 of the 9 districts in Tennessee are unknown.

		James Monroe Democratic-Republican			No candidate Federalist			Others			Not cast	Margin		Ref
State	Electoral votes	#	%	Electoral votes	#	%	Electoral votes	#	%	Electoral votes	#	#	%	
Alabama	3	-	-	3	-	-	-	-	-	-	-	-	-	
Connecticut	9	3,871	84.17%	9	728	15.83%	-	-	-	-	-	3,143	68.34%	
Delaware	4	-	-	4	-	-	-	-	-	-	-	-	-	
Georgia	8	-	-	8	-	-	-	-	-	-	-	-	-	
Illinois	3	940	65.14%	3	-	-	-	503	34.86%	-	-	749	51.91%	
Indiana	3	-	-	3	-	-	-	-	-	-	-	-	-	
Kentucky	12	2,729	58.44%	12	1,941	41.56%	-	-	-	-	-	788	16.88%	
Louisiana	3	-	-	3	-	-	-	-	-	-	-	-	-	
Maine	9	4,364	97.19%	9	-	-	-	126	2.81%	-	-	8,878	91.39%	
Maryland	11	4,167	82.61%	11	877	17.39%	-	-	-	-	-	3,290	65.22%	
Massachusetts	15	8,124	32.26%	15	17,009	67.55%	-	47	0.19%	-	-	-8,885	-35.29%	
Mississippi	3	490	100%	2	-	-	-	-	-	-	1	490	100%	
Missouri	3	-	-	3	-	-	-	-	-	-	-	-	-	
New Hampshire	8	9,459	98.96%	7	99	1.04%	-	-	-	1	-	9,360	97.92%	
New Jersey	8	4,102	99.88%	8	5	0.12%	-	-	-	-	-	4,097	99.76%	
New York	29	-	-	29	-	-	-	-	-	-	-	-	-	
North Carolina	15	3,340	99.11%	15	1	0.03%	-	29	0.86%	-		3,311	98.25%	
Ohio	8	7,164	99.53%	8	-	-	-	34	0.47%	-	-	7,130	99.06%	
Pennsylvania	25	30,313	94.12%	24	-	-	-	1,893	5.88%	-	1	28,420	88.24%	
Rhode Island	4	724	100%	4	-	-	-	-	-	-	-	724	100%	
South Carolina	11	-	-	11	-	-	-	-	-	-	-	-	-	
Tennessee	8	1,336	80.34%	7	-	-	-	327	19.66%	-	1	1,009	60.68%	
Vermont	8	-	-	8	-	-	-	-	-	-	-	-	-	
Virginia	25	4,320	100%	25	-	-	-	-	-	-	-	4,320	100%	

=== States that flipped from Federalist to Democratic-Republican ===
- Connecticut
- Delaware
- Massachusetts

=== Electoral votes by state ===
State	Electoral votes	For President			For Vice President					
State	Electoral votes	JM	JQA	B	DT	RS	DR	RH	RR	B
Alabama	3	3	—	—	3	—	—	—	—	—
Connecticut	9	9	—	—	9	—	—	—	—	—
Delaware	4	4	—	—	—	—	4	—	—	—
Georgia	8	8	—	—	8	—	—	—	—	—
Illinois	3	3	—	—	3	—	—	—	—	—
Indiana	3	3	—	—	3	—	—	—	—	—
Kentucky	12	12	—	—	12	—	—	—	—	—
Louisiana	3	3	—	—	3	—	—	—	—	—
Maine	9	9	—	—	9	—	—	—	—	—
Maryland	11	11	—	—	10	—	—	1	—	—
Massachusetts	15	15	—	—	7	8	—	—	—	—
Missouri	3	3	—	—	3	—	—	—	—	—
Mississippi	3	2	—	1	2	—	—	—	—	1
New Hampshire	8	7	1	—	7	—	—	—	1	—
New Jersey	8	8	—	—	8	—	—	—	—	—
New York	29	29	—	—	29	—	—	—	—	—
North Carolina	15	15	—	—	15	—	—	—	—	—
Ohio	8	8	—	—	8	—	—	—	—	—
Pennsylvania	25	24	—	1	24	—	—	—	—	1
Rhode Island	4	4	—	—	4	—	—	—	—	—
South Carolina	11	11	—	—	11	—	—	—	—	—
Tennessee	8	7	—	1	7	—	—	—	—	1
Vermont	8	8	—	—	8	—	—	—	—	—
Virginia	25	25	—	—	25	—	—	—	—	—
TOTAL	235	231	1	3	218	8	4	1	1	3
TO WIN	118				118					

== Electoral college selection ==
Method of choosing electors	State(s)
Each elector appointed by state legislature	Alabama; Delaware; Georgia; Indiana; Louisiana; Missouri; New York; South Carolina; Vermont
Each elector chosen by voters statewide	Connecticut; Mississippi; New Hampshire; New Jersey; North Carolina; Ohio; Pennsylvania; Rhode Island; Virginia
State divided into electoral districts, with one elector chosen per district by the voters of that district	Illinois; Maryland; Tennessee
State divided into three electoral districts, with four electors chosen per district by the voters of each district	Kentucky
Two electors chosen by voters statewide and one elector chosen per congressional district by the voters of that district	Maine; Massachusetts

== See also ==
- List of 1820 United States presidential electors
- History of the United States (1789–1849)
- One-party state
- Second inauguration of James Monroe
- 1820–21 United States House of Representatives elections
- 1820–21 United States Senate elections

== Bibliography ==
- Turner, Lynn W. (September 1955). "The Electoral Vote against Monroe in 1820—An American Legend". The Mississippi Valley Historical Review. 42 (2). Organization of American Historians: 250–273. doi:10.2307/1897643. JSTOR 1897643.
- "A Historical Analysis of the Electoral College". The Green Papers.
