= 1820 United States presidential election in Connecticut =

- November 1 – December 6, 1820
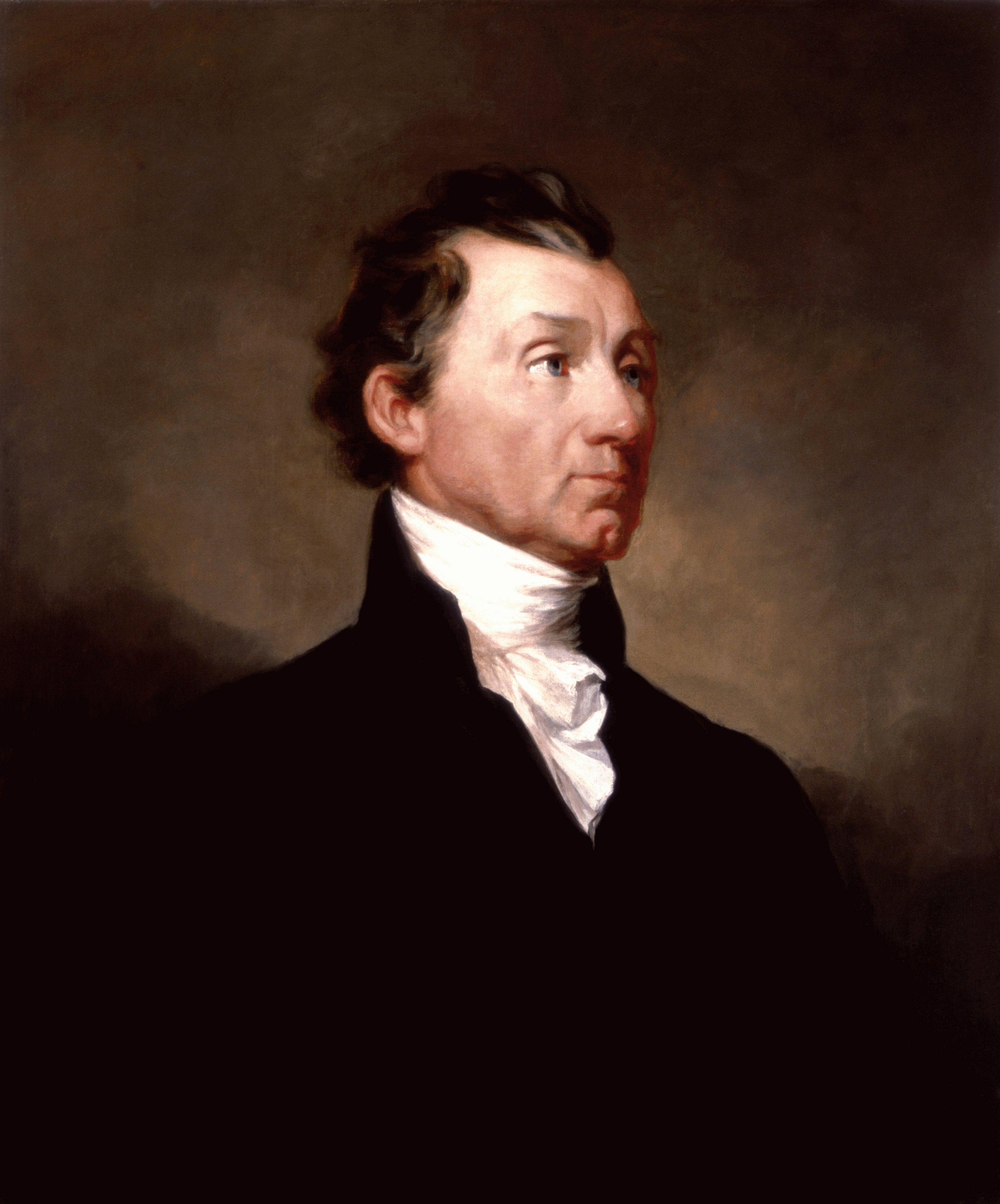

Nominee	James Monroe	Federalist electors
Party	Democratic-Republican	Federalist
Home state	Virginia	—
Running mate	Daniel D. Tompkins	—
Electoral vote	9	0
Popular vote	3,871	728
Percentage	84.17%	15.83%
County results
Monroe
70–80%
80–90%
90–100%
President before election
James Monroe
Democratic-Republican
Elected President
James Monroe
Democratic-Republican

The 1820 United States presidential election in Connecticut took place between November 1 to December 6, 1820, as part of the 1820 United States presidential election. Voters chose nine representatives, or electors to the Electoral College, who voted for President and Vice President.

During this election, Connecticut cast its nine electoral votes to Democratic Republican candidate and incumbent President James Monroe.

Effectively, the 1820 presidential election was an election with no campaign, since there was no serious opposition to Monroe and Tompkins. In fact, they won all the electoral votes barring 1 from New Hampshire, which was cast for Secretary of State John Quincy Adams.

== Results ==
1820 United States presidential election in Connecticut
Party	Candidate	Votes	Percentage	Electoral votes
Democratic-Republican	James Monroe	3,871	84.17%	9
Federalist	Unpledged electors	728	15.83%	0
Totals		4,599	100.0%	9

=== Results By County ===
1820 United States Presidential Election in Connecticut (By County)
County	James Monroe Democratic-Republican		Unpledged Electors Federalist		Total Votes Cast
County	#	%	#	%	Total Votes Cast
Fairfield	511	96.78%	17	3.22%	528
Hartford	416	76.47%	128	23.53%	544
Litchfield	657	80.32%	161	19.68%	818
Middlesex	196	77.17%	58	22.83%	254
New Haven	602	89.45%	71	10.55%	673
New London	703	82.03%	154	17.97%	857
Tolland	215	81.75%	48	18.25%	263
Windham	570	86.23%	91	13.77%	661
Total	3,870	84.17%	728	15.83%	4,598

== See also ==
- United States presidential elections in Connecticut
