= 1820 United States presidential election in Maine =

- November 1 – December 6, 1820
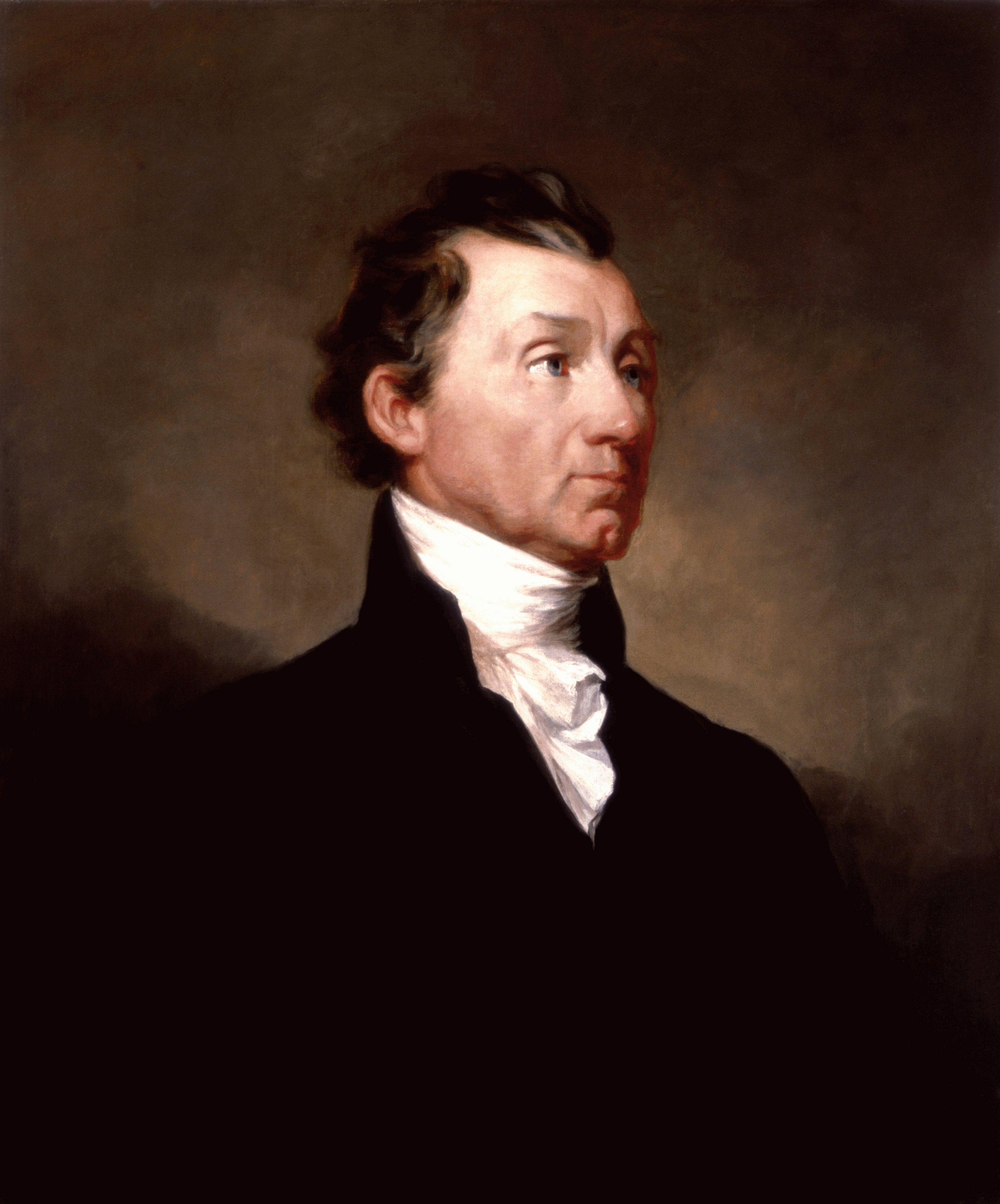
Nominee	James Monroe
Party	Democratic-Republican
Home state	Virginia
Running mate	Daniel D. Tompkins
Electoral vote	9
Popular vote	9,282
Percentage	95.83%
County results
Monroe
70–80%
80–90%
90–100%
No data/vote
President before election
James Monroe
Democratic-Republican
Elected President
James Monroe
Democratic-Republican

The 1820 United States presidential election in Maine took place between November 1 to December 6, 1820, as part of the 1820 United States presidential election. The state's popular vote chose nine representatives, or electors, to the Electoral College, who voted for president and vice president.

Maine voted in its first ever United States presidential election, having become the 23rd state by splitting off Massachusetts on March 15 of the same year. The state cast its nine electoral votes for the Democratic Republican candidate and incumbent president James Monroe, who won the state by a margin of 91.56%.

Effectively, the 1820 presidential election was an election with no campaign, since there was no serious opposition to Monroe and Tompkins. In fact, Monroe won all the electoral votes, barring one from neighboring New Hampshire, which was cast for Secretary of State John Quincy Adams.

== See also ==
- United States presidential elections in Maine
