= 1820 United States presidential election in Tennessee =

- November 1 – December 6, 1820
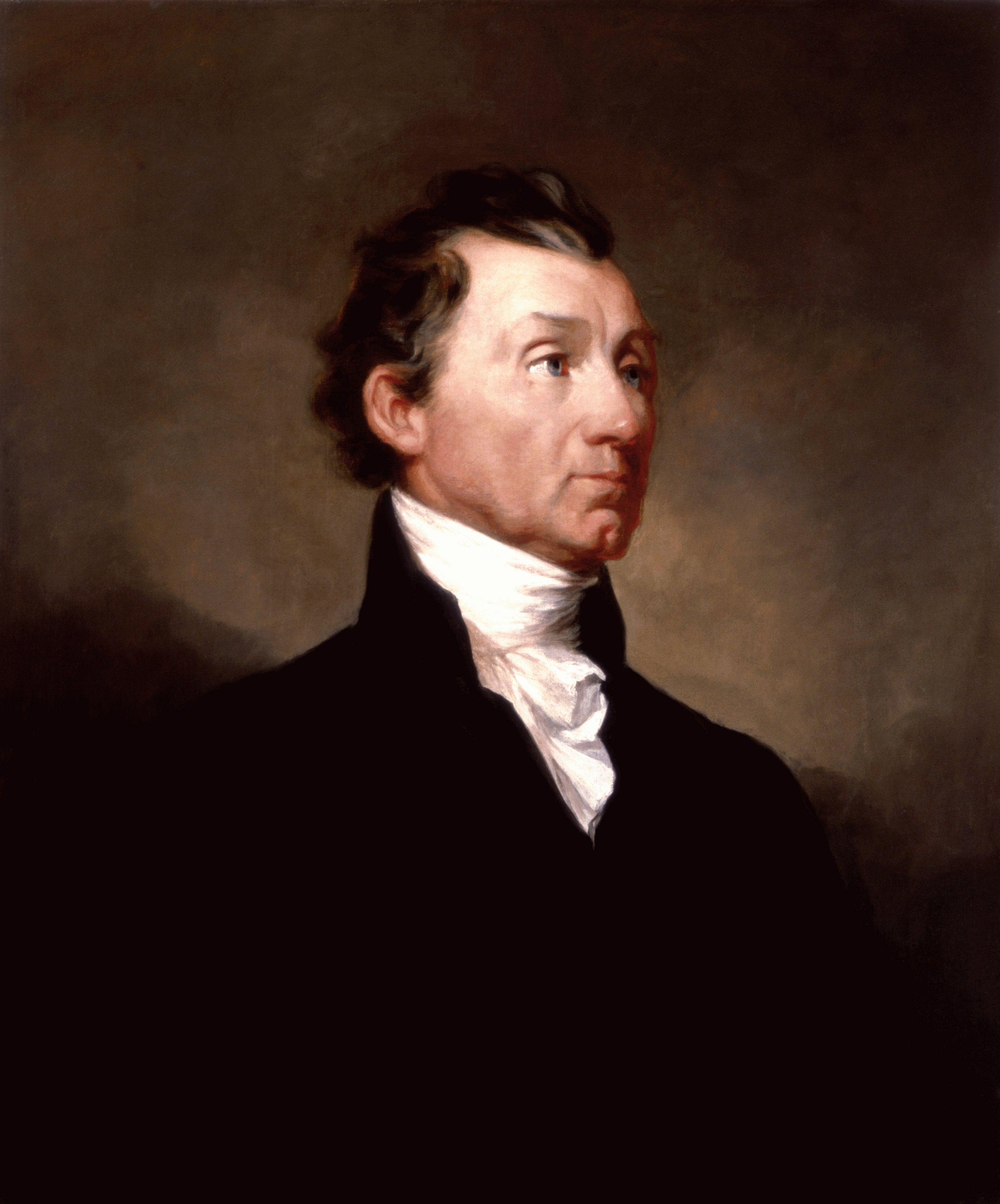
Nominee	James Monroe
Party	Democratic-Republican
Home state	Virginia
Running mate	Daniel D. Tompkins
Electoral vote	7
Popular vote	1,336
Percentage	80.34%
County results
Monroe
90–100%
Unknown/no vote
President before election
James Monroe
Democratic-Republican
Elected President
James Monroe
Democratic-Republican

The 1820 United States presidential election in Tennessee took place between November 1 and December 6, 1820, as part of the 1820 United States presidential election. Voters chose eight representatives, or electors, to the Electoral College, who voted for president and vice president.

Tennessee cast seven electoral votes for the Democratic-Republican candidate and incumbent President James Monroe, as he ran effectively unopposed. The electoral votes for vice president were cast for Monroe's running mate Daniel D. Tompkins from New York. The state was divided into electoral districts, with each district being assigned an elector who was chosen by the voters. However one elector died before the electoral votes were cast and was not replaced; therefore, only seven votes were cast for Monroe and Tompkins, instead of eight.

== Results ==
1820 United States presidential election in Tennessee
Party	Candidate	Votes	Percentage	Electoral votes
Democratic-Republican	James Monroe (incumbent)	1,336	80.34%	7
	Others	327	19.66%	0
None	Not Cast	–	–	1
Totals		1,663	100.0%	8

== See also ==
- United States presidential elections in Tennessee
