= 1820 United States presidential election in Virginia =

- November 1 – December 6, 1820
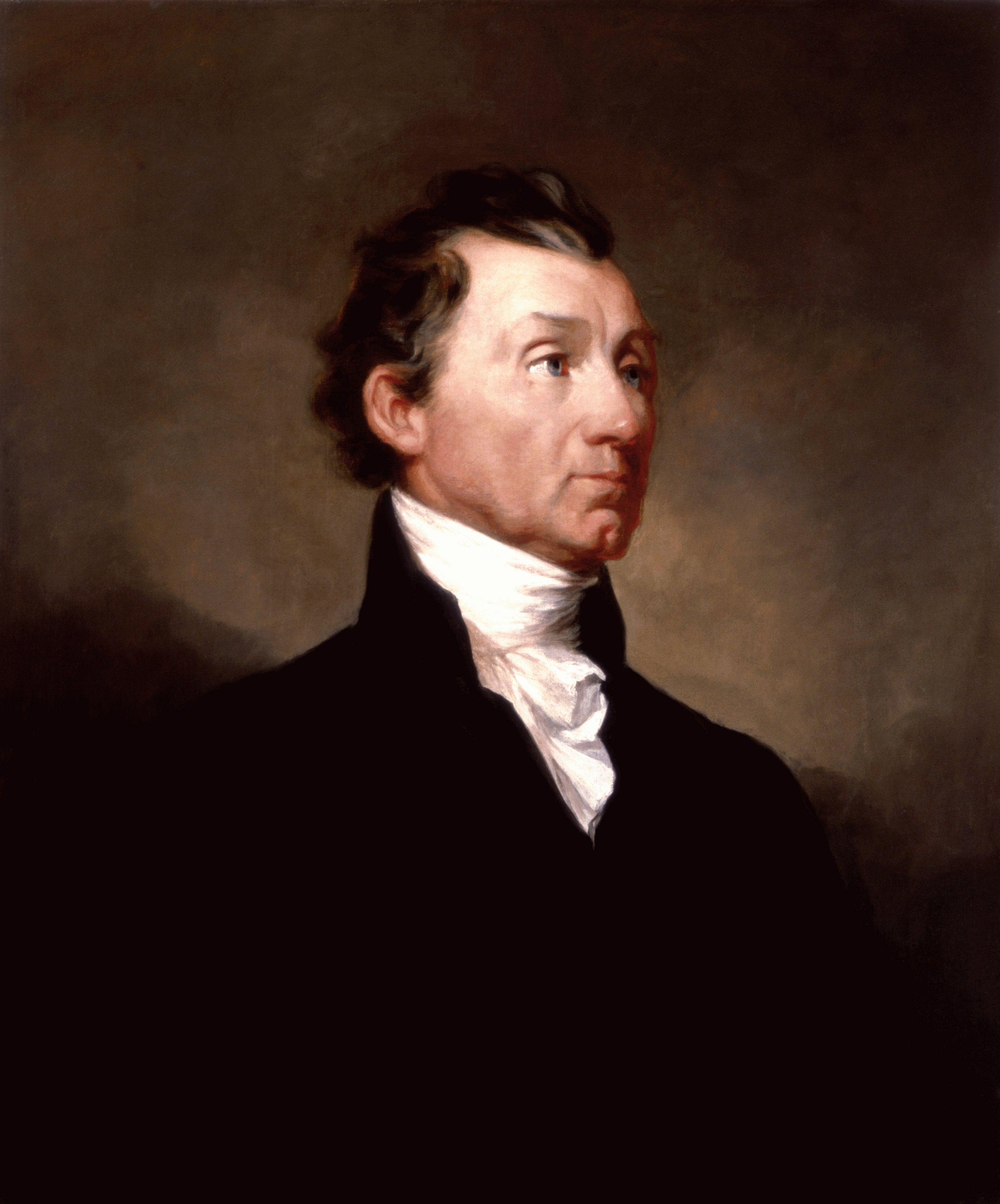
Nominee	James Monroe
Party	Democratic-Republican
Home state	Virginia
Running mate	Daniel D. Tompkins
Electoral vote	25
Popular vote	4,320
Percentage	100.00%
County results
Monroe
90–100%
No Data/Vote

The 1820 United States presidential election in Virginia took place between November 1 and December 6, 1820, as part of the 1820 United States presidential election. Voters chose 25 representatives, or electors, to the Electoral College, who voted for president and vice president.

Virginia cast 25 electoral votes for the Democratic-Republican candidate and incumbent President James Monroe, as he ran effectively unopposed. The electoral votes for vice president were cast for Monroe's running mate Daniel D. Tompkins from New York. Each elector was chosen by the voters statewide.

== Results ==
1820 United States presidential election in Virginia
Party	Candidate	Votes	Percentage	Electoral votes
Democratic-Republican	James Monroe (incumbent)	4,320	100.00%	25
Totals		4,320	100.0%	25

== See also ==
- United States presidential elections in Virginia
