= 1820 United States presidential election in Mississippi =

- November 1 – December 6, 1820
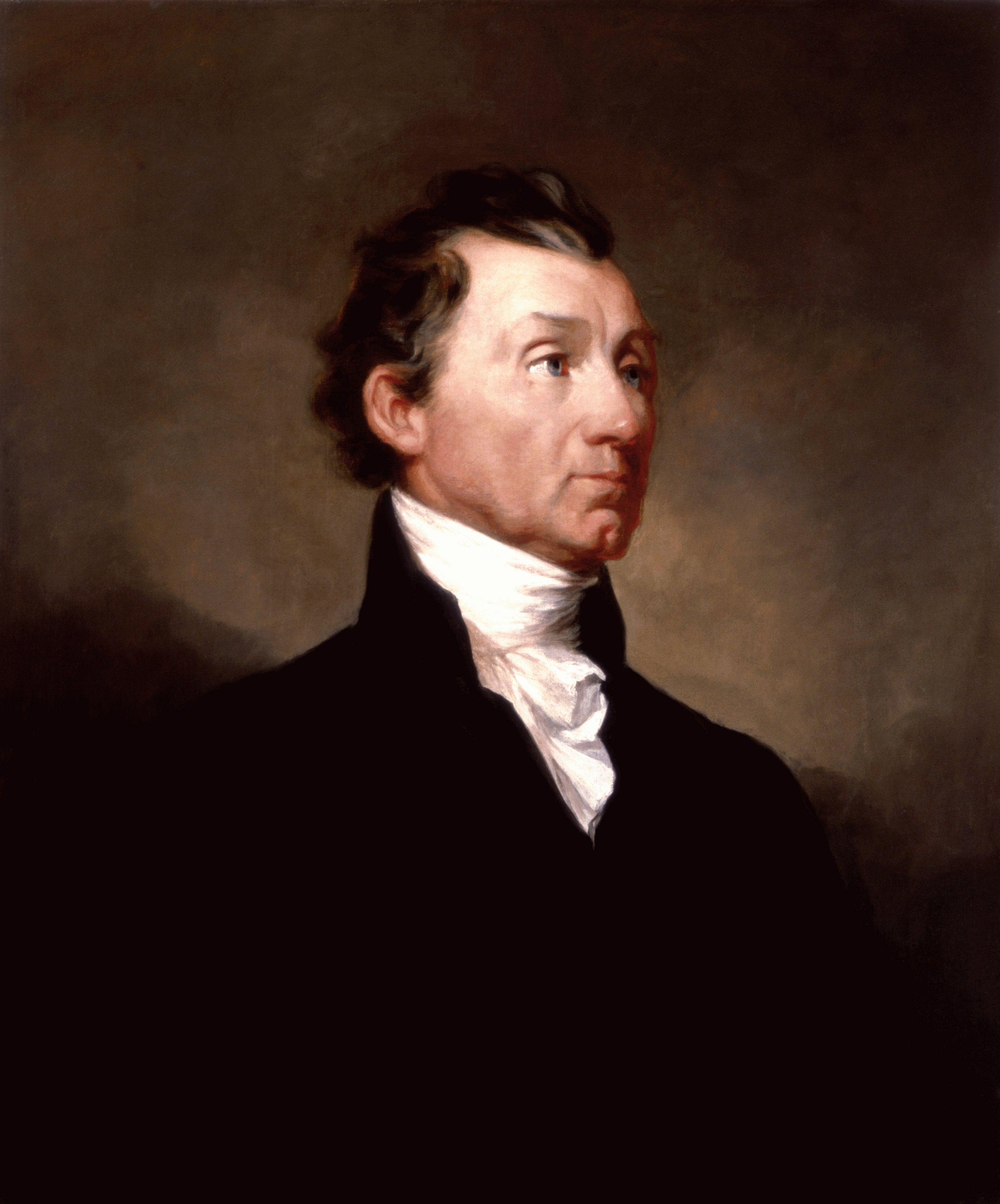
Nominee	James Monroe
Party	Democratic-Republican
Home state	Virginia
Running mate	Daniel D. Tompkins
Electoral vote	2
Popular vote	490
Percentage	100.00%

The 1820 United States presidential election in Mississippi took place between November 1 and December 6, 1820, as part of the 1820 United States presidential election. Voters chose three representatives, or electors to the Electoral College, who voted for President and Vice President. It was the first Presidential election that Mississippi participated in since being admitted to the Union on December 10, 1817.

Mississippi cast two electoral votes for the Democratic-Republican candidate and incumbent President James Monroe, as he ran effectively unopposed. The electoral votes for Vice president were cast for Monroe's running mate Daniel D. Tompkins from New York. Each state elector was chosen by the voters statewide. However one elector died before the electoral votes were cast and was not replaced, therefore only two votes were cast for Monroe and Tompkins instead of three.

This election is one of three occasions where only two electoral votes were cast by a place in a presidential election: the others were in Washington, DC in 2000, as one of the district's three electors abstained, and in Nevada in 1864 due to one of the electors getting snowbound and there being no law to replace him.

== Results ==
1820 United States presidential election in Mississippi
Party	Candidate	Votes	Percentage	Electoral votes
Democratic-Republican	James Monroe (incumbent)	490	100.0%	2
None	Not Cast	–	–	1
Totals		490	100.0%	3

== See also ==
- United States presidential elections in Mississippi
