= 1820 United States presidential election in Delaware =

- November 1 – December 6, 1820
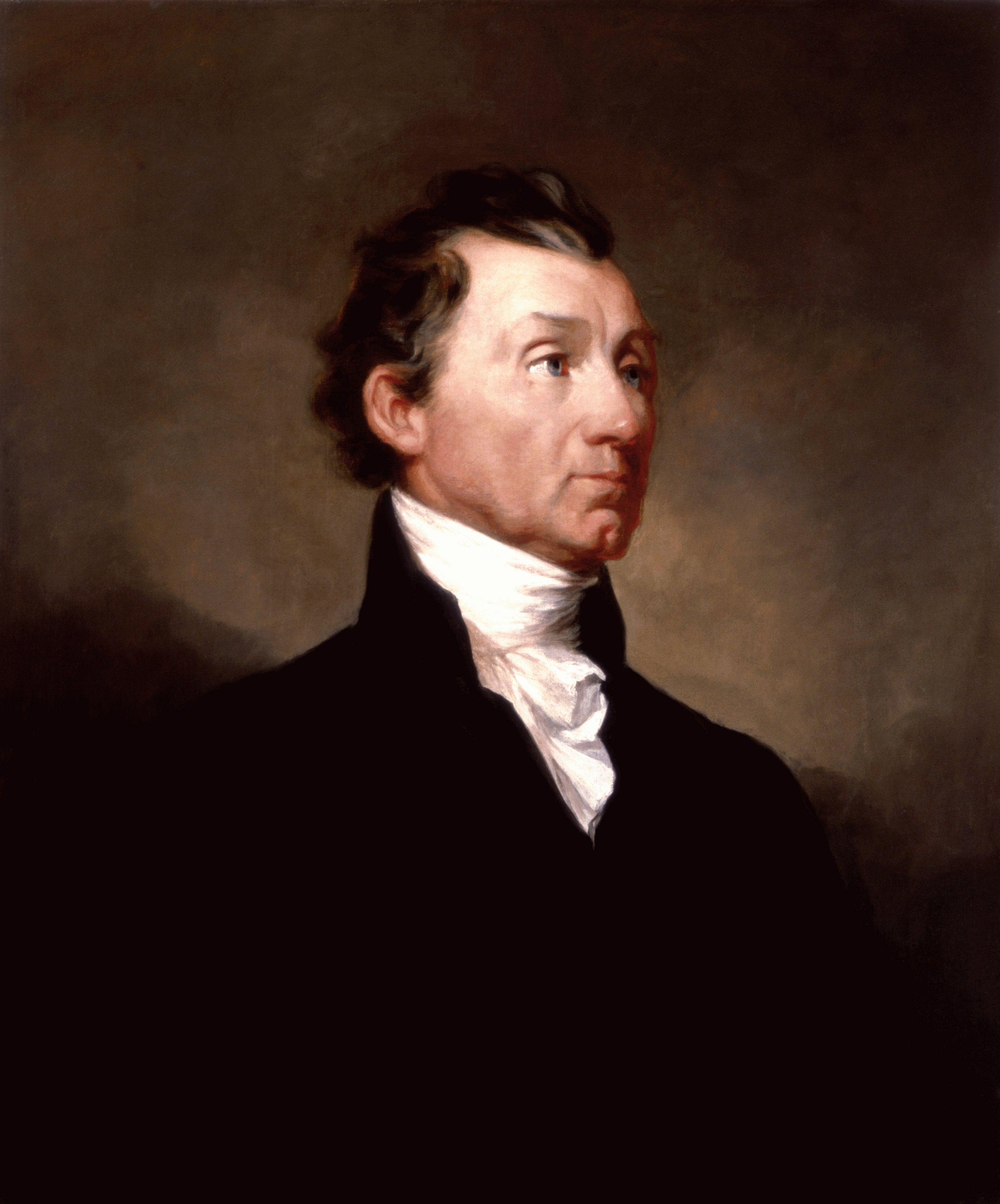
| Nominee | James Monroe |
| Party | Democratic-Republican |
| Home state | Virginia |
| Running mate | Daniel Rodney |
| Electoral vote | 4 |

The 1820 United States presidential election in Delaware took place between November 1 and December 6, 1820, as part of the 1820 United States presidential election. Voters chose four representatives, or electors to the Electoral College, who voted for President and Vice President.

Delaware cast four electoral votes for the Democratic-Republican candidate and incumbent President James Monroe, as he ran effectively unopposed. The electoral votes for Vice president were however not cast for Monroe's running mate Daniel D. Tompkins, but for Federalist Daniel Rodney from Delaware. These electors were elected by the Delaware General Assembly, the state legislature, rather than by popular vote.

== Results ==
1820 United States presidential election in Delaware
| Party | Candidate | Votes | Percentage | Electoral votes |
|---|---|---|---|---|
| Democratic-Republican | James Monroe (incumbent) | – | – | 4 |
| Totals | | – | – | 4 |

== See also ==
- United States presidential elections in Delaware
