= 1820 United States presidential election in Georgia =

- November 1 – December 6, 1820
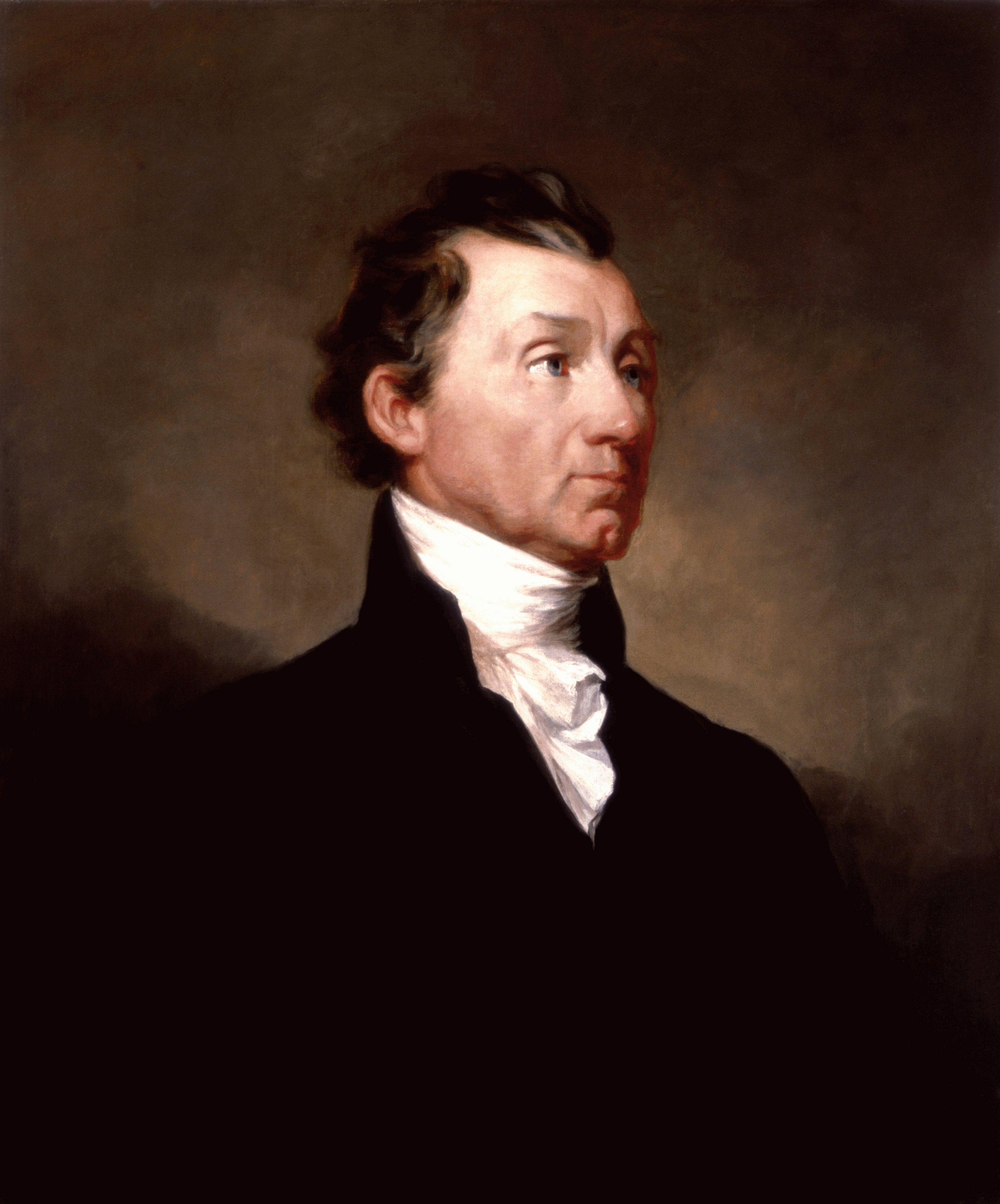
Nominee	James Monroe
Party	Democratic-Republican
Home state	Virginia
Running mate	Daniel D. Tompkins
Electoral vote	8

The 1820 United States presidential election in Georgia took place between November 1 and December 6, 1820, as part of the 1820 United States presidential election. The state legislature chose eight representatives, or electors to the Electoral College, who voted for President and Vice President.

Georgia cast eight electoral votes for the Democratic-Republican candidate and incumbent President James Monroe, as he ran effectively unopposed. The electoral votes for Vice president were cast for Monroe's running mate Daniel D. Tompkins from New York. These electors were elected by the Georgia General Assembly, the state legislature, rather than by popular vote.

== Results ==
1820 United States presidential election in Georgia
Party	Candidate	Votes	Percentage	Electoral votes
Democratic-Republican	James Monroe (incumbent)	–	–	8
Totals		–	–	8

== See also ==
- United States presidential elections in Georgia
