= 1820 United States presidential election in Massachusetts =

- November 1 – December 6, 1820
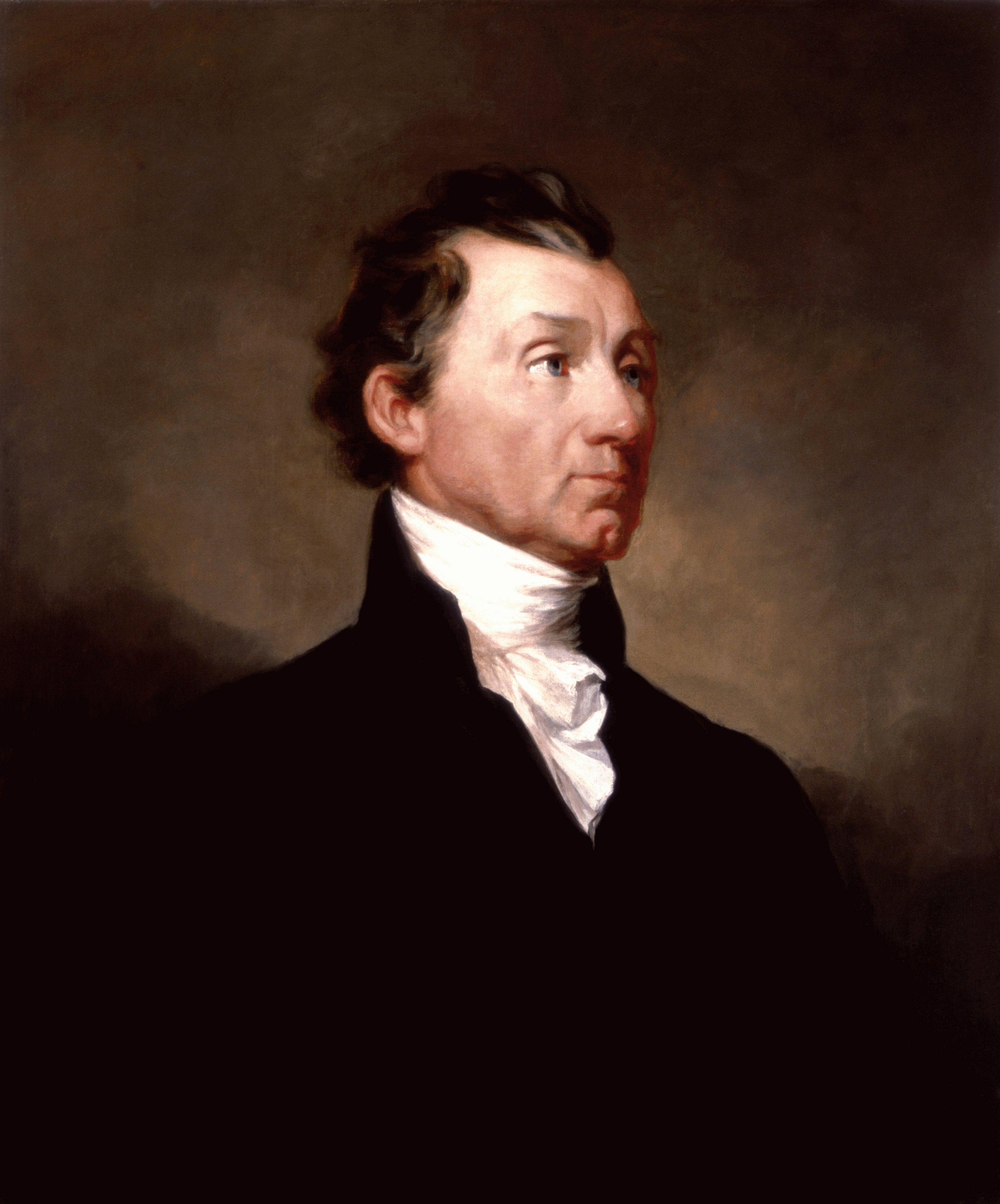

Nominee	James Monroe	Federalist electors
Party	Democratic-Republican	Federalist
Home state	Virginia	—
Running mate	Daniel D. Tompkins	Richard Stockton
Electoral vote	15	0
Popular vote	7,689	16,341
Percentage	32.00%	68.00%
County results
Monroe
50–60%
Federalist electors
50–60%
60–70%
70–80%
80–90%
90–100%
President before election
James Monroe
Democratic-Republican
Elected President
James Monroe
Democratic-Republican

The 1820 United States presidential election in Massachusetts took place between November 6 and December 1, 1820, as part of the 1820 United States presidential election. Voters chose 15 representatives, or electors to the Electoral College, who voted for president and vice president.

During this election, the Democratic-Republican Party was the only major national party, but the Federalist Party (which had no candidate) won the popular vote in Massachusetts. The unpledged Federalist electors won Massachusetts by a wide margin of 36.00%. Among the electors chosen was former President John Adams, who cast his vote for the Democratic-Republican candidate James Monroe.

== Results ==
1820 United States presidential election in Massachusetts
Party	Candidate	Votes	Percentage	Electoral votes
Democratic-Republican	James Monroe (incumbent)	7,689	32.00%	15
Federalist	Unpledged electors	16,341	68.00%	0
Totals		24,030	100.0%	15

1820 vice presidential electoral vote		
Party	Candidate	Electoral votes
Federalist	Richard Stockton	8
Democratic-Republican	Daniel Tompkins (incumbent)	7
Totals		15

== See also ==
- United States presidential elections in Massachusetts
