= 1820 United States presidential election in Kentucky =

- November 1 – December 6, 1820
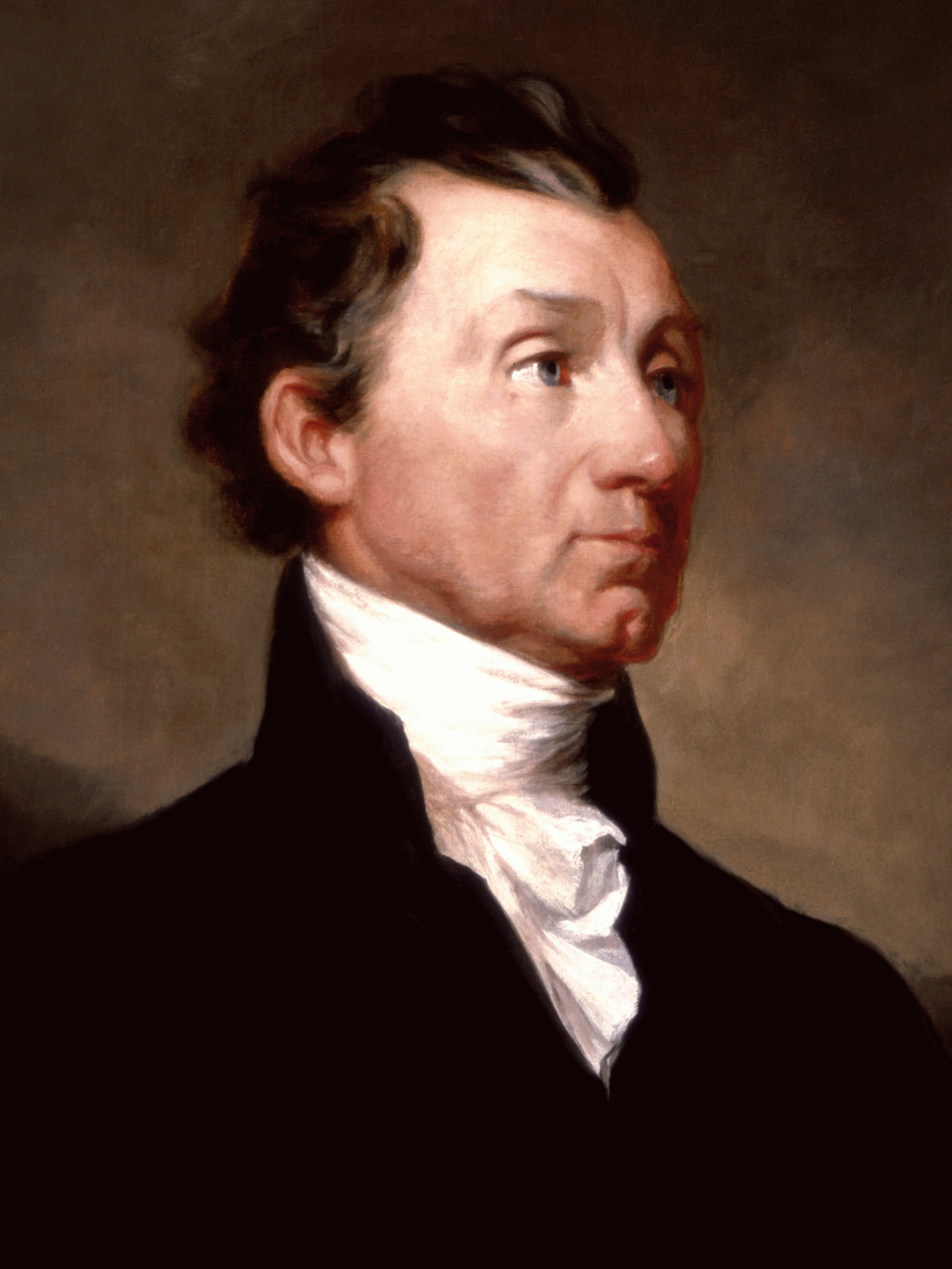
Nominee	James Monroe
Party	Democratic-Republican
Alliance	Federalist
Home state	Virginia
Running mate	Daniel D. Tompkins
Electoral vote	11
Popular vote	4,670
Percentage	100%

Monroe (Democratic-Republican)
50–60%
60–70%
70–80%
80–90%
90–100%
Monroe (Federalist)
50–60%

The 1820 United States presidential election in Kentucky took place between November 1 and December 6, 1820, as part of the 1820 United States presidential election. Voters chose twelve representatives, or electors to the Electoral College, who voted for President and Vice President.

Kentucky cast twelve electoral votes for the Democratic-Republican candidate and incumbent President James Monroe, as he ran effectively unopposed. The electoral votes for Vice president were cast for Monroe's running mate Daniel D. Tompkins from New York. The state was divided into three electoral districts with four electors each, whereupon each district's voters chose the electors through block voting. Monroe electors ran unopposed in Districts 1 and 3. In District 2, a single Federalist elector pledged to Monroe ran, winning more votes than the best performing Monroe elector.

== Results ==
1820 United States presidential election in Kentucky
Party	Candidate	Votes	Percentage	Electoral votes
Democratic-Republican	James Monroe (incumbent)	2,729	58.44%	12
Federalist		1,941	41.56%	0
Totals		4,670	100.0%	12

=== Results by electoral district ===
Results by District
District	James Monroe Democratic-Republican			James Monroe Federalist			Margin		Total Votes Cast
District	#	%	Electors	#	%	Electors	#	%	Total Votes Cast
1	No Data	100%	4	no candidates			No Data	100%	No Data
2	1,471	43.11%	3	1,941	56.89%	1	-470	-13.78%	3,412
3	1,258	100%	4	no candidates			1,258	100%	1,258
Total	2,729	58.44%	12	1,941	41.56%	0 (Note: The single Federalist elector voted for Monroe)	788	16.88%	4,670

== See also ==
- United States presidential elections in Kentucky
