= 1820 United States presidential election in Maryland =

- 1820
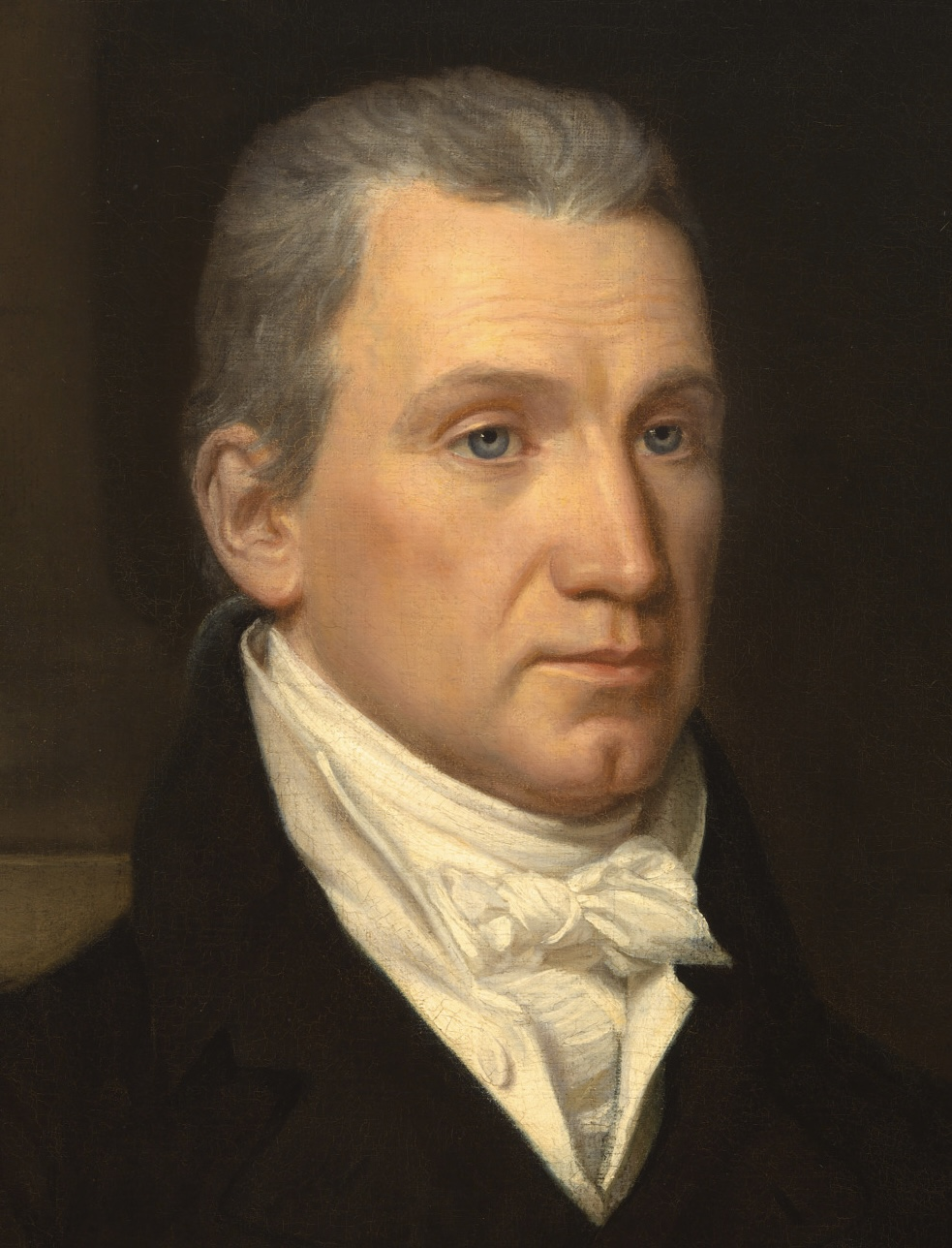

Nominee	James Monroe	Federalist Electors
Party	Democratic-Republican	Federalist
Home state	Virginia	—
Running mate	Daniel D. Tompkins	Robert Goodloe Harper
Electoral vote	11	1 (Note: The Federalist Party was unable to put forward a presidential candidate this year. Federalist electors cast their vote for Monroe as President, but cast their vote for a Federalist Vice-President candidate, in the case of Maryland this was Robert Goodloe Harper)
Popular vote	4,167	877
Percentage	82.61%	17.39%
County results
Monroe
40–50%
50–60%
80–90%
90–100%
Federalist
70–80%
90–100%
President before election
James Monroe
Democratic-Republican
Elected President
James Monroe
Democratic-Republican

The 1820 United States presidential election in Maryland took place on an unknown date in 1820. Voters chose eleven representatives, or electors, to the Electoral College, who voted for president and vice president.

Early elections were quite different from modern ones. Voters voted for individual electors, who were pledged to vote for certain candidates. Often, which candidate an elector intended to support was unclear. Prior to the ratification of the 12th amendment, each elector did not distinguish between a vote cast for president and vice president, and simply cast two votes.

Starting with the 1796 United States presidential election and ending with the 1824 United States presidential election, Maryland used an electoral district system to choose its electors, with each district electing a single elector. This method is similar to the way Nebraska and Maine choose their electors in modern elections.

== Results ==
Presidential candidate	Party	Home state	Popular vote		Electoral vote
Presidential candidate	Party	Home state	Count	Percentage	Electoral vote
James Monroe	Democratic-Republican	Virginia	4,167	82.61%	11
-	Federalist	-	877	17.39%	1
Total			5,044	100.00%	11

=== Results by electoral district ===
Results by district
District	James Monroe Democratic-Republican			No candidate Federalist			Other Federalist			Margin		Total votes cast
District	#	%	Electors	#	%	Electors	#	%	Electors	#	%	Total votes cast
1	140	20.55%	0	541	79.45%	1	0	0.00%	0	-401	-58.90%	681
2	470	95.33%	1	12	2.43%	0	11	2.24%	0	447	90.66%	493
3	769	97.71%	2	18	2.29%	0	0	0.00%	0	751	95.42%	787
4	803	99.13%	2	4	0.49%	0	3	0.38%	0	796	98.26%	810
5	283	100.00%	1	0	0.00%	0	0	0%	0	283	100.00%	283
6	489	98.98%	1	1	0.20%	0	4	0.82%	0	484	97.96%	494
7	679	100.00%	1	0	0.00%	0	0	0%	0	679	100.00%	679
8	553	93.09%	1	37	6.23%	0	4	0.68%	0	512	86.18%	594
9	254	44.88%	1	245	43.29%	0	67	11.83%	0	-58	-10.24%	566
Total	4,167	82.61%	11	877	17.39%	1	167		0	3290	65.22%	5,044

=== Results by county ===
County	James Monroe Democratic-Republican		No candidate Federalist		Other		Margin		Total votes cast
County	#	%	#	%	#	%	#	%	Total votes cast
Allegany	151	100.00%	0	0.00%	0	0%	151	100.00%	151
Anne Arundel	175	100.00%	0	0.00%	0	0%	175	100.00%	175
Baltimore (City and County)	851	100.00%	0	0.00%	0	0%	851	100.00%	851
Calvert	105	99.05%	1	0.95%	0	0.00%	104	-98.10%	106
Caroline	163	100.00%	0	0.00%	0	0.00%	163	100.00%	163
Cecil	191	99.48%	1	0.52%	0	0.00%	190	98.96%	190
Charles	46	25.00%	138	75.00%	0	0.00%	-92	-50.00%	118
Dorchester	196	64.26%	109	35.74%	0	0.00%	87	28.52%	305
Frederick	444	100.00%	0	0.00%	0	0.00%	444	100.00%	444
Harford	297	100.00%	0	0.00%	0	0.00%	297	100.00%	297
Kent	181	100.00%	0	0.00%	0	0%	181	100.00%	181
Montgomery	115	92.00%	10	8.00%	0	0%	105	84.00%	125
Prince George's	328	91.11%	32	8.89%	0	0.00%	296	82.22%	360
Queen Anne's	259	100.00%	0	0.00%	0	0%	259	100.00%	259
St. Mary's	41	9.79%	378	90.21%	0	0%	-337	-80.43%	419
Somerset	89	64.49%	49	35.51%	0	0.00%	40	28.99%	138
Talbot	232	88.89%	29	11.11%	0	0.00%	203	77.78%	261
Washington	218	98.64%	3	1.36%	0	0.00%	215	97.29%	221
Worcester	101	66.89%	50	33.11%	0	0.00%	51	33.77%	15
Total	4,167	82.61%	877	17.39%	0	0.00	3290	65.22%	5,044

==== Counties that flipped from Federalist to Democratic-Republican ====
- Calvert
- Caroline
- Dorchester
- Somerset
- Talbot
- Worcester

== See also ==
- United States presidential elections in Maryland
- 1820 United States presidential election
- 1820 United States elections
