= 1820 United States presidential election in Ohio =

- November 1 – December 6, 1820
- Turnout: 6.8% ▲1.5 pp
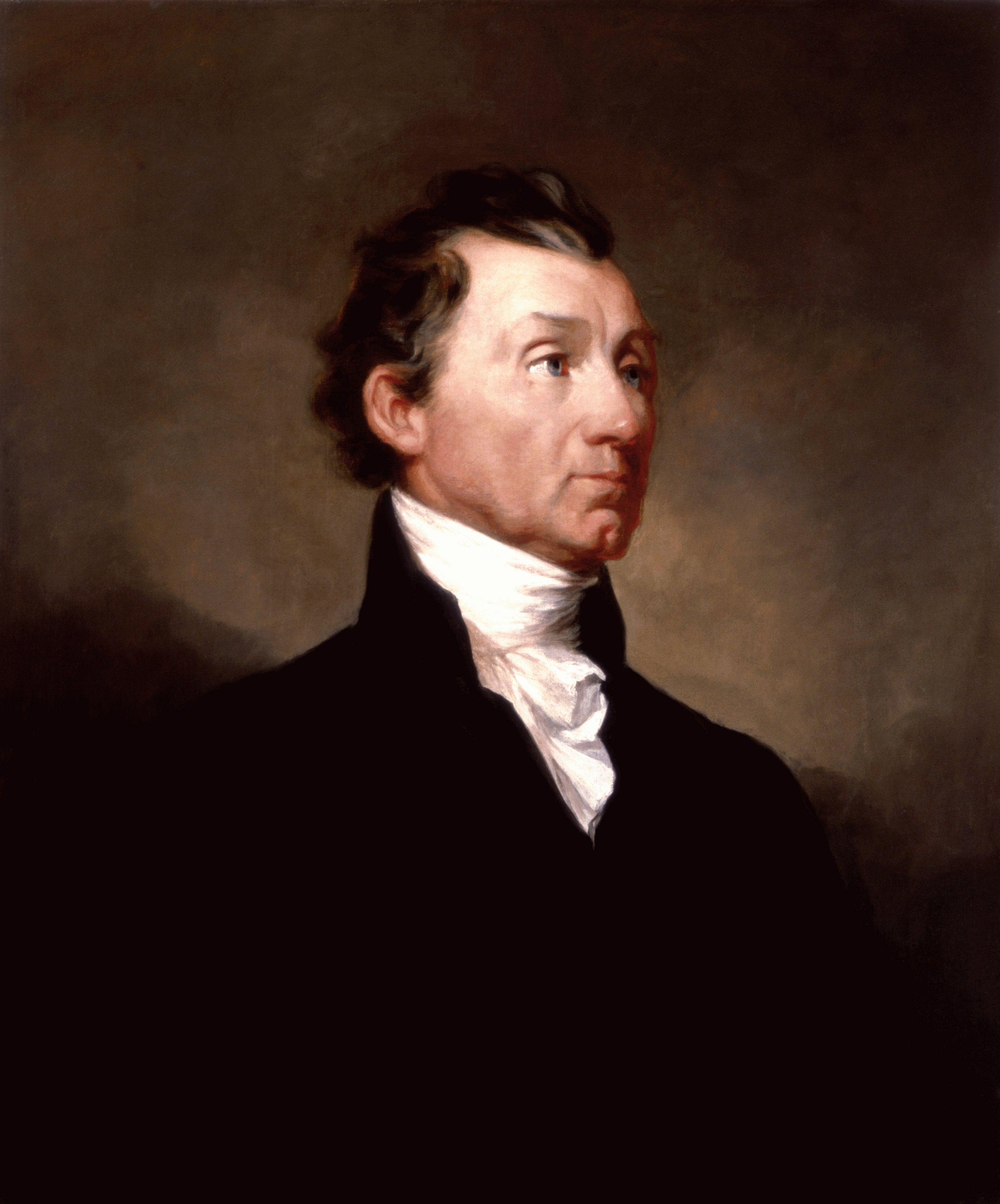

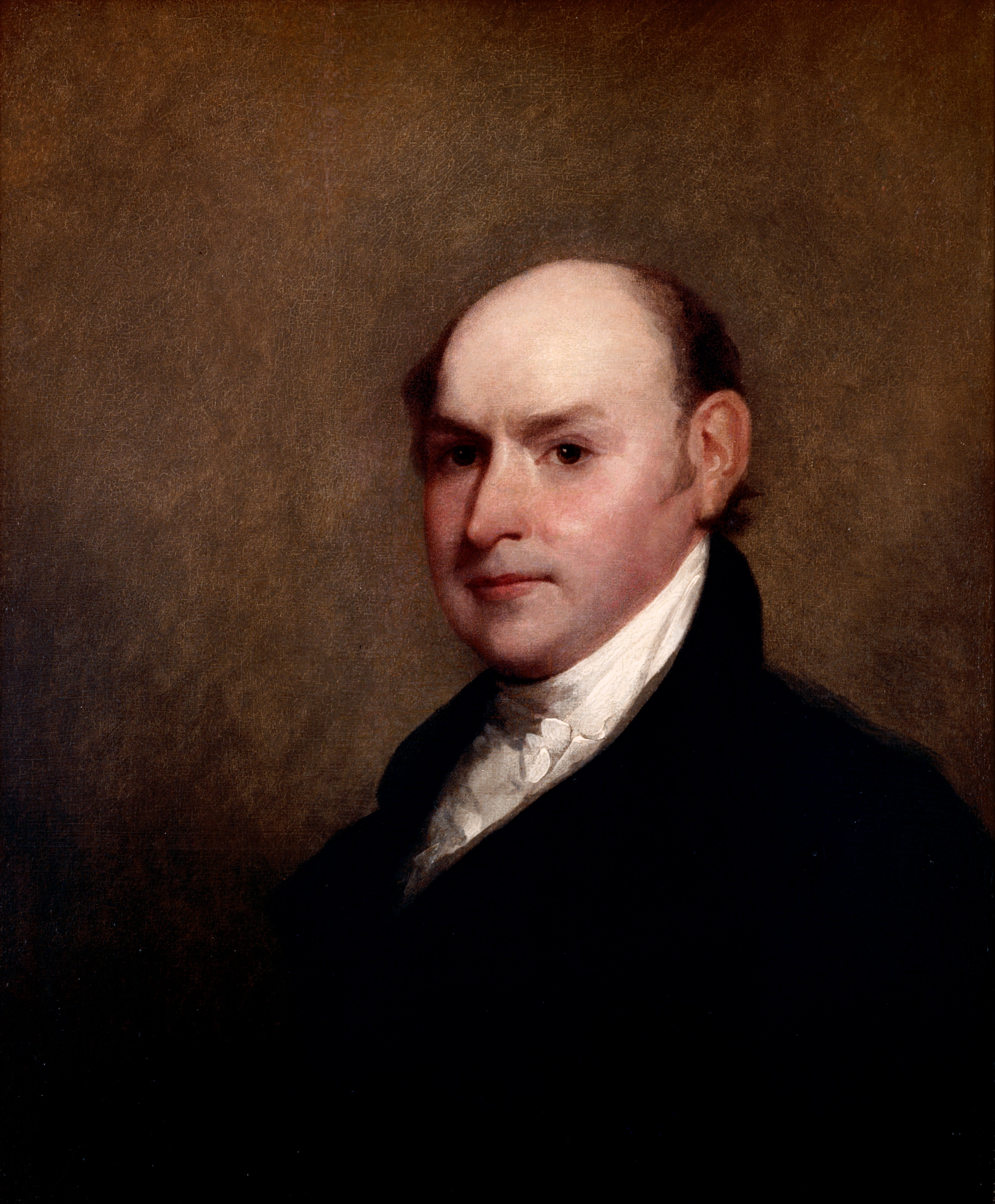
| Nominee | James Monroe | John Quincy Adams |
| Party | Democratic-Republican | Democratic-Republican |
| Home state | Virginia | Massachusetts |
| Running mate | Daniel D. Tompkins |
| Electoral vote | 8 | 0 |
| Popular vote | 7,164 | 2,215 |
| Percentage | 76.38% | 23.62% |
President before election
James Monroe
Democratic-Republican
Elected President
James Monroe
Democratic-Republican

The 1820 United States presidential election in Ohio took place between November 1 and December 6, 1820, as part of the 1820 United States presidential election. Voters chose 8 representatives, or electors to the Electoral College, who voted for President and Vice President.

Ohio re-elected incumbent Democratic-Republican Party President James Monroe by a large margin. Although Monroe ran unopposed, John Quincy Adams received a minority of the vote as an opposition candidate. Among the electors was future president William Henry Harrison, who voted for Monroe along with the rest of the electors.

== Results ==
1820 United States presidential election in Ohio
| Party | Candidate | Votes | Percentage | Electoral votes |
|---|---|---|---|---|
| Democratic-Republican | James Monroe (incumbent) | 7,164 | 76.38% | 8 |
| Democratic-Republican | John Quincy Adams | 2,215 | 23.62% | 0 |

== See also ==
- United States presidential elections in Ohio

== Bibliography ==
- Ratcliffe, Donald J. (Autumn 1987). "Voter Turnout in Early Ohio". Journal of the Early Republic. 7 (3): 223–51. JSTOR 3123782.
