= 1820 United States presidential election in Rhode Island =

- November 1 – December 6, 1820
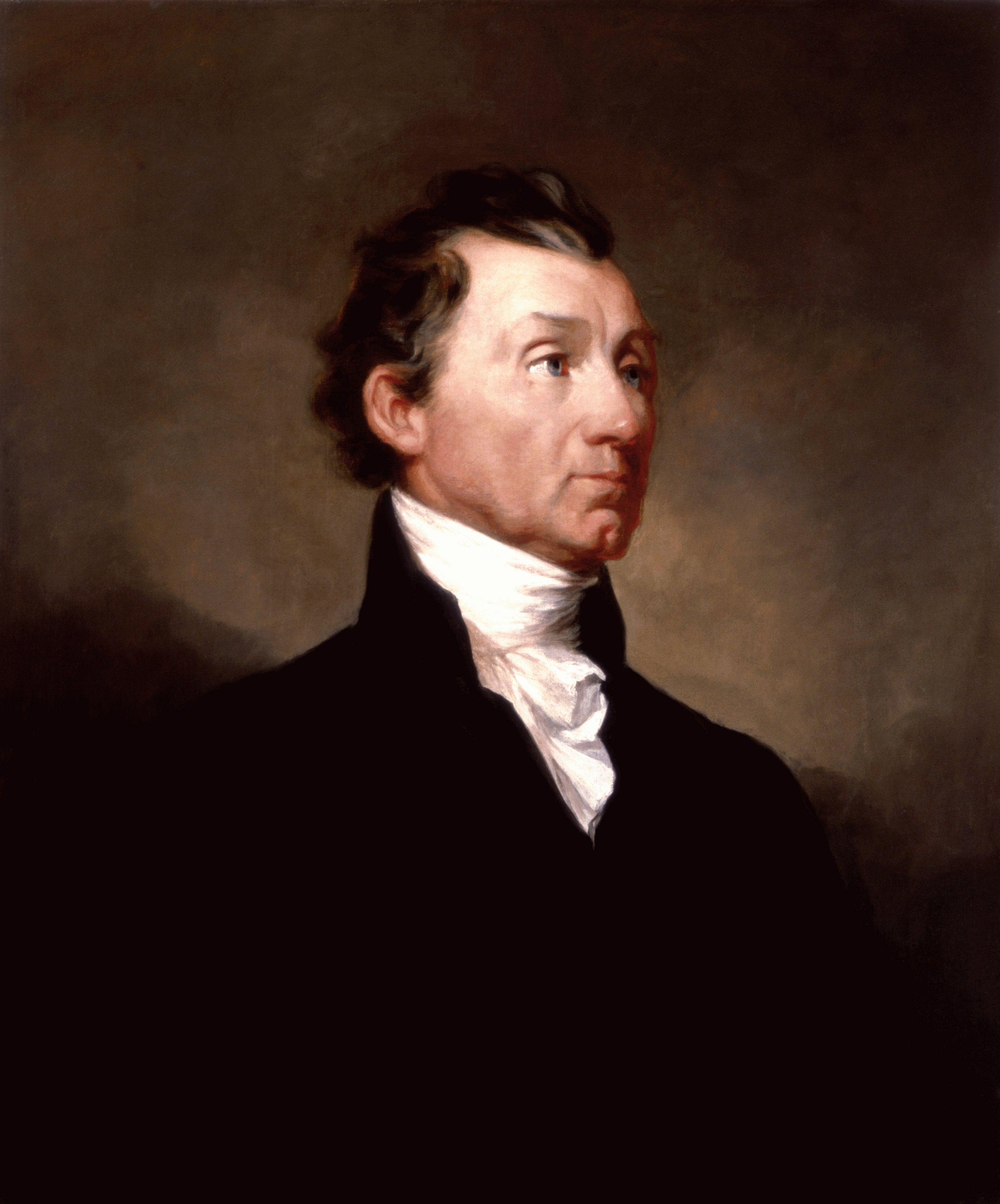
| Nominee | James Monroe |
| Party | Democratic-Republican |
| Home state | Virginia |
| Running mate | Daniel D. Tompkins |
| Electoral vote | 4 |
| Popular vote | 724 |
| Percentage | 100.00% |

Monroe
>90%
No data

The 1820 United States presidential election in Rhode Island took place between November 1 and December 6, 1820, as part of the 1820 United States presidential election. Voters chose four representatives, or electors, to the Electoral College, who voted for president and vice president.

Rhode Island cast four electoral votes for the Democratic-Republican candidate and incumbent President James Monroe, as he ran effectively unopposed. The electoral votes for vice president were cast for Monroe's running mate, Daniel D. Tompkins from New York. Each state elector was chosen by the voters statewide.

== Results ==
1820 United States presidential election in Rhode Island
| Party | Candidate | Votes | Percentage | Electoral votes |
|---|---|---|---|---|
| Democratic-Republican | James Monroe (incumbent) | 724 | 100.0% | 4 |
| Totals | | 724 | 100.0% | 4 |

== See also ==
- United States presidential elections in Rhode Island
