= 1820 United States presidential election in Indiana =

- November 30, 1820
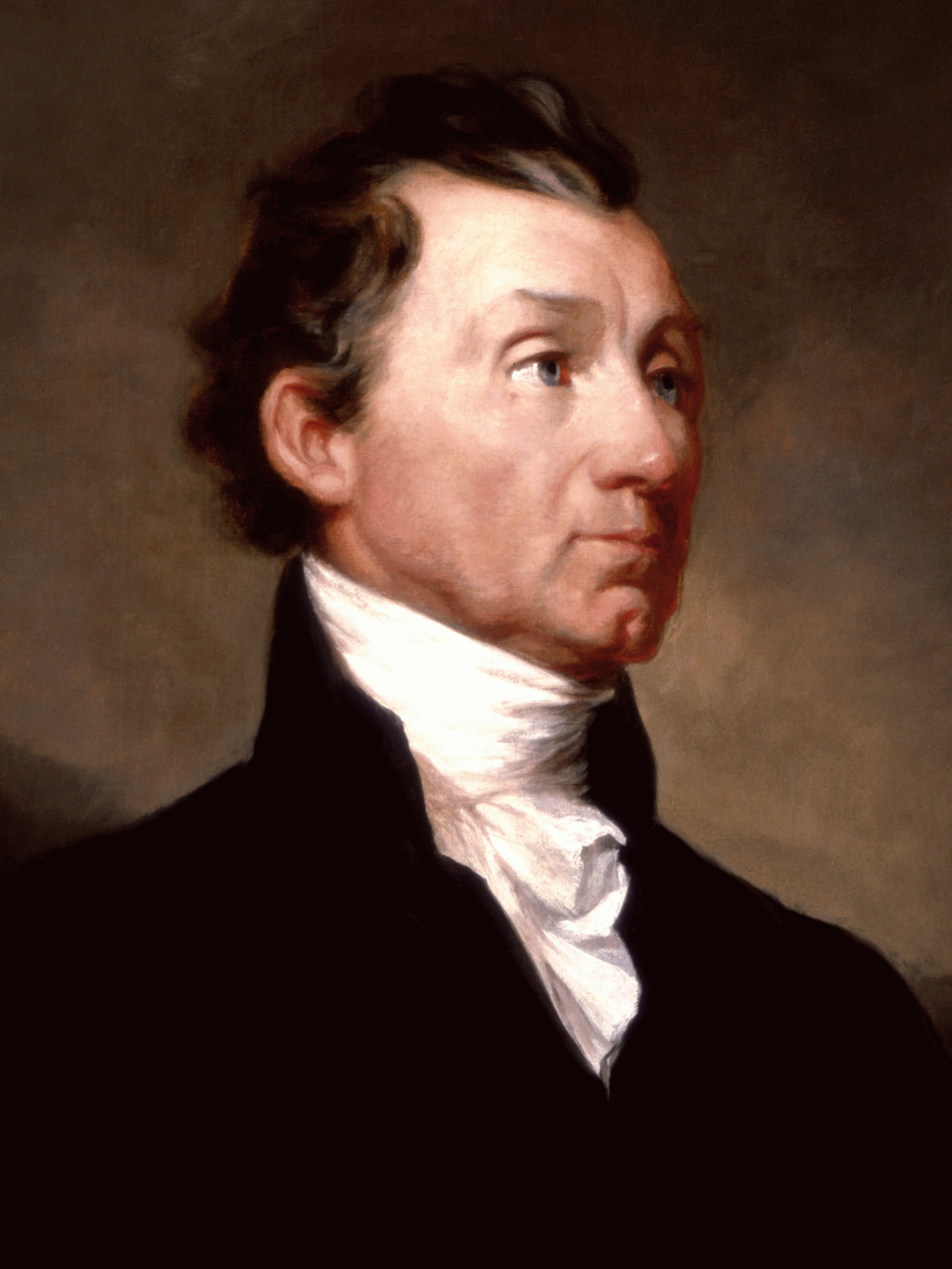
Nominee	James Monroe
Party	Democratic-Republican
Home state	Virginia
Running mate	Daniel D. Tompkins
Electoral vote	3
President before election
James Monroe
Democratic-Republican
Elected President
James Monroe
Democratic-Republican

A presidential election was held in Indiana on November 30, 1820, as part of the 1820 United States presidential election. The Democratic-Republican ticket of the incumbent president James Monroe and vice president Daniel D. Tompkins received three votes from electors chosen by the Indiana General Assembly. Monroe easily won the national election with 231 electoral votes; one faithless elector voted for the U.S. secretary of state John Quincy Adams.

== General election ==
1820 United States presidential election in Indiana
Party	Candidate	Votes
Democratic-Republican	Daniel J. Caswell	**
Democratic-Republican	Nathaniel Ewing	**
Democratic-Republican	John H. Thompson	**
Total		**

== See also ==
- United States presidential elections in Indiana

== Bibliography ==
- "1820 Electoral College Results". National Archives.
- Riker, Dorothy; Thornbrough, Gayle, eds. (1960). Indiana Election Returns, 1816–1851. Indianapolis: Indiana Historical Bureau.
