= 1820 United States presidential election in North Carolina =

- November 1 – December 6, 1820
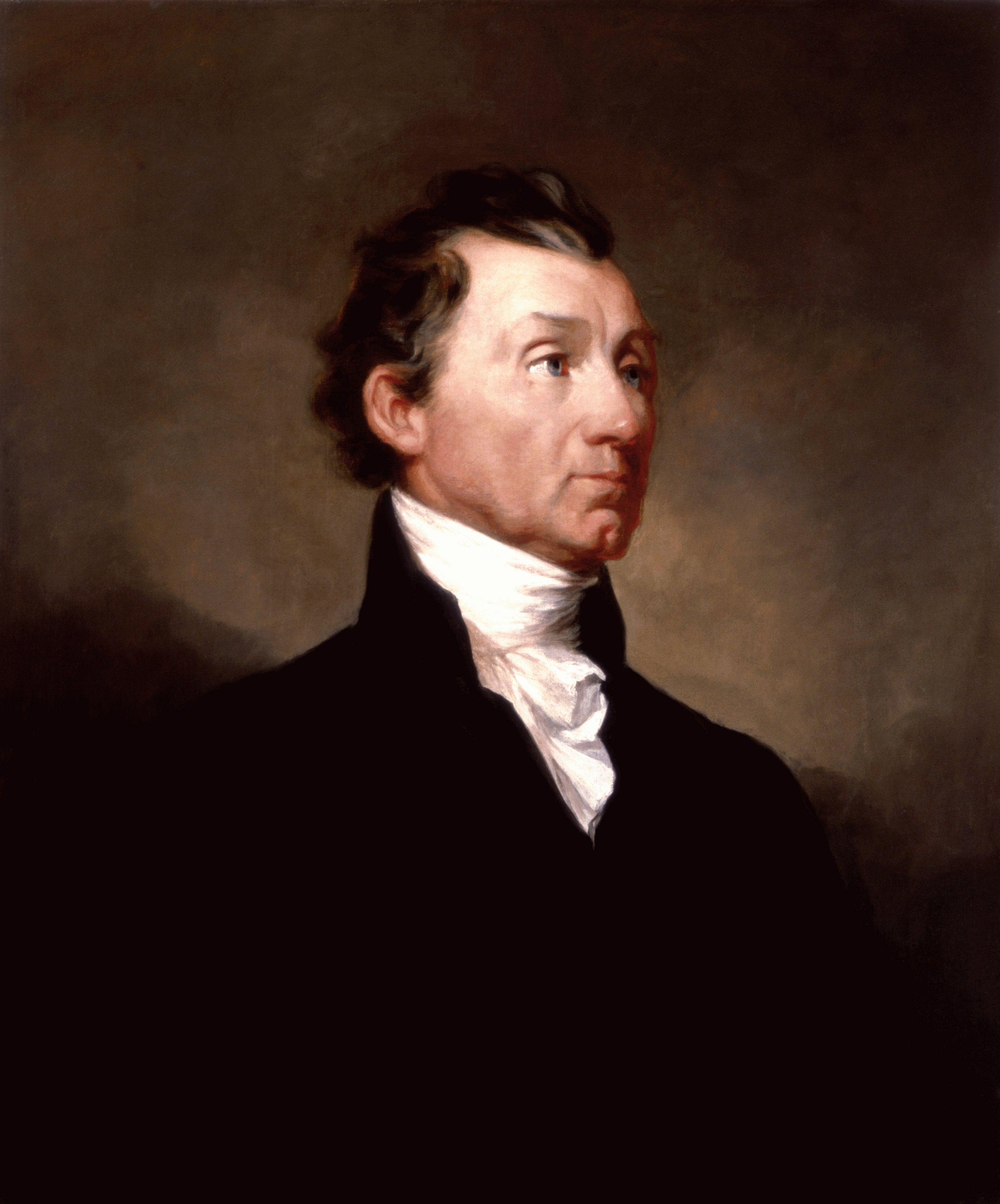
Nominee	James Monroe
Party	Democratic-Republican
Home state	Virginia
Running mate	Daniel D. Tompkins
Electoral vote	15
Popular vote	3,340
Percentage	99.11%
County results
Monroe
60–70%
70–80%
80–90%
90–100%
Independent electors
50–60%
90–100%
Independent electors
30–40%

The 1820 United States presidential election in North Carolina took place between November 1 and December 6, 1820, as part of the 1820 United States presidential election. Voters chose fifteen representatives, or electors, to the Electoral College, who voted for president and vice president.

North Carolina cast fifteen electoral votes for the Democratic-Republican candidate and incumbent President James Monroe, as he ran effectively unopposed. The electoral votes for vice president were cast for Monroe's running mate Daniel D. Tompkins from New York. Each state elector was chosen by the voters statewide.

== Results ==
1820 United States presidential election in North Carolina
Party	Candidate	Votes	Percentage	Electoral votes
Democratic-Republican	James Monroe (incumbent)	3,340	99.11%	15
Federalist		1	0.03%	0
Others		29	0.86%	0
Totals		3,370	100.0%	15

== See also ==
- United States presidential elections in North Carolina
