= 1820 United States presidential election in Pennsylvania =

- November 1 – December 6, 1820
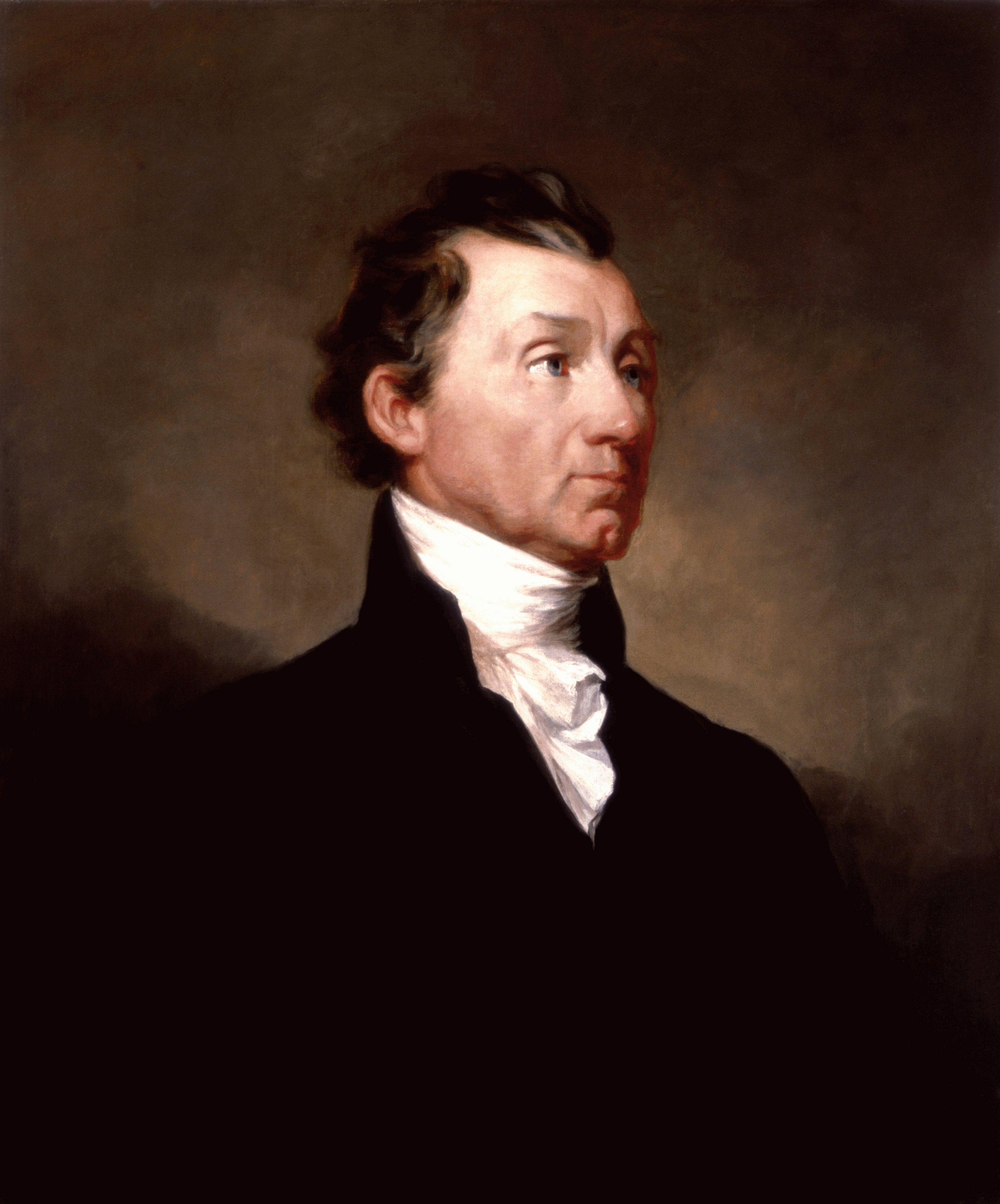

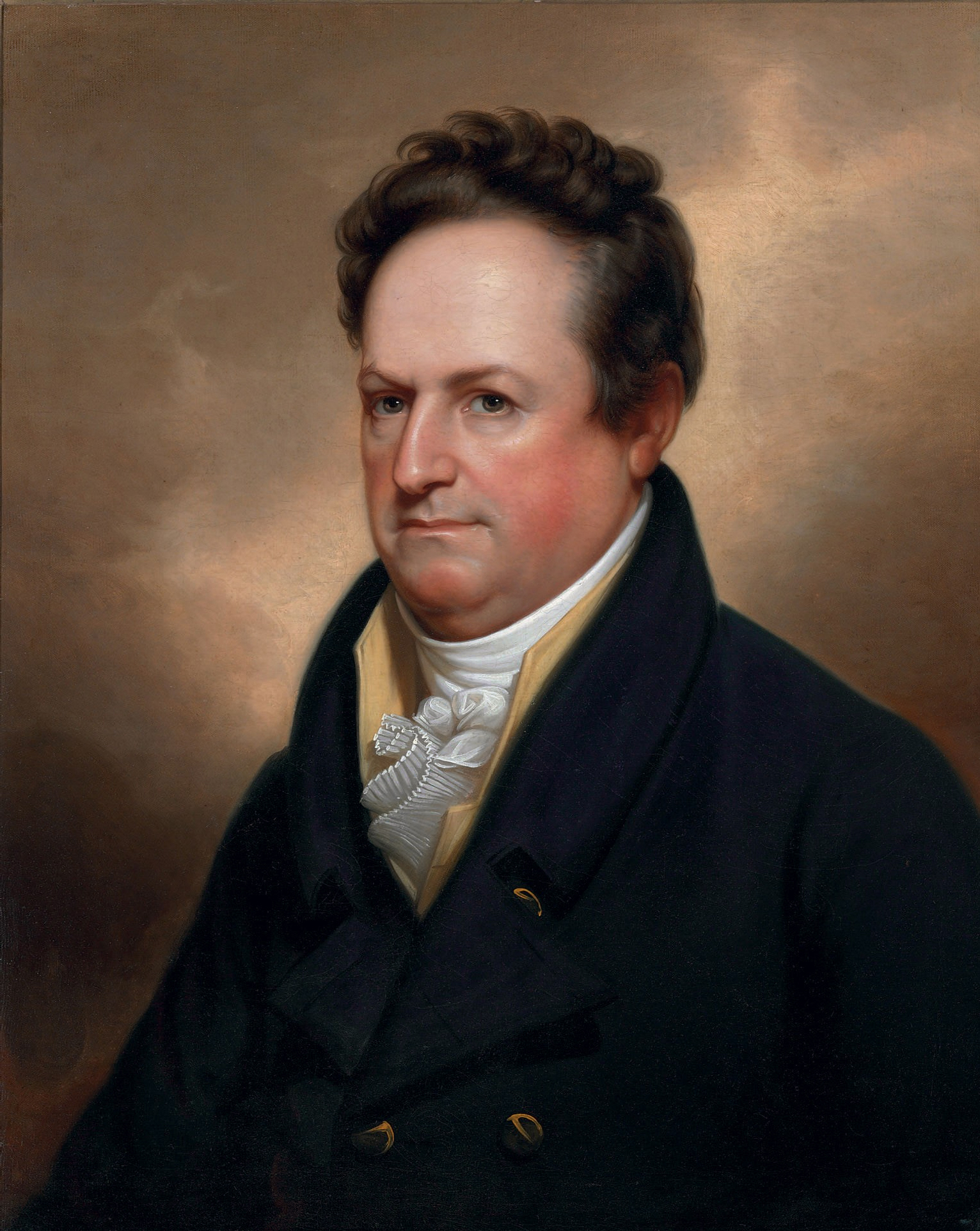
Nominee	James Monroe	DeWitt Clinton
Party	Democratic-Republican	Independent
Home state	Virginia	New York
Running mate	Daniel D. Tompkins	-
Electoral vote	24	0
Popular vote	30,313	1,893
Percentage	94.12%	5.88%
County results
Monroe
70–80%
80–90%
90–100%
President before election
James Monroe
Democratic-Republican
Elected President
James Monroe
Democratic-Republican

A presidential election was held in Pennsylvania in 1820 as part of the 1820 United States presidential election. Voters chose 25 representatives, or electors to the Electoral College, who voted for President and Vice President. Only 24 electoral votes were cast from Pennsylvania, however, due to one of the electors having died.

During this election, James Monroe was re-elected by a large margin. Pennsylvania voted for Monroe over opposition candidate DeWitt Clinton.

== Results ==
1820 United States presidential election in Pennsylvania
Party	Candidate	Votes	Percentage	Electoral votes
Democratic-Republican	James Monroe (incumbent)	30,313	94.12%	24
Independent	DeWitt Clinton	1,893	5.88%	0
Totals		32,206	100.0%	24

Note: Election results totals only include known numbers, as verified by the source. Vote totals from several counties are missing/unknown.

== See also ==
- United States presidential elections in Pennsylvania
