= 1820 United States presidential election in Missouri =

- November 1 – December 6, 1820
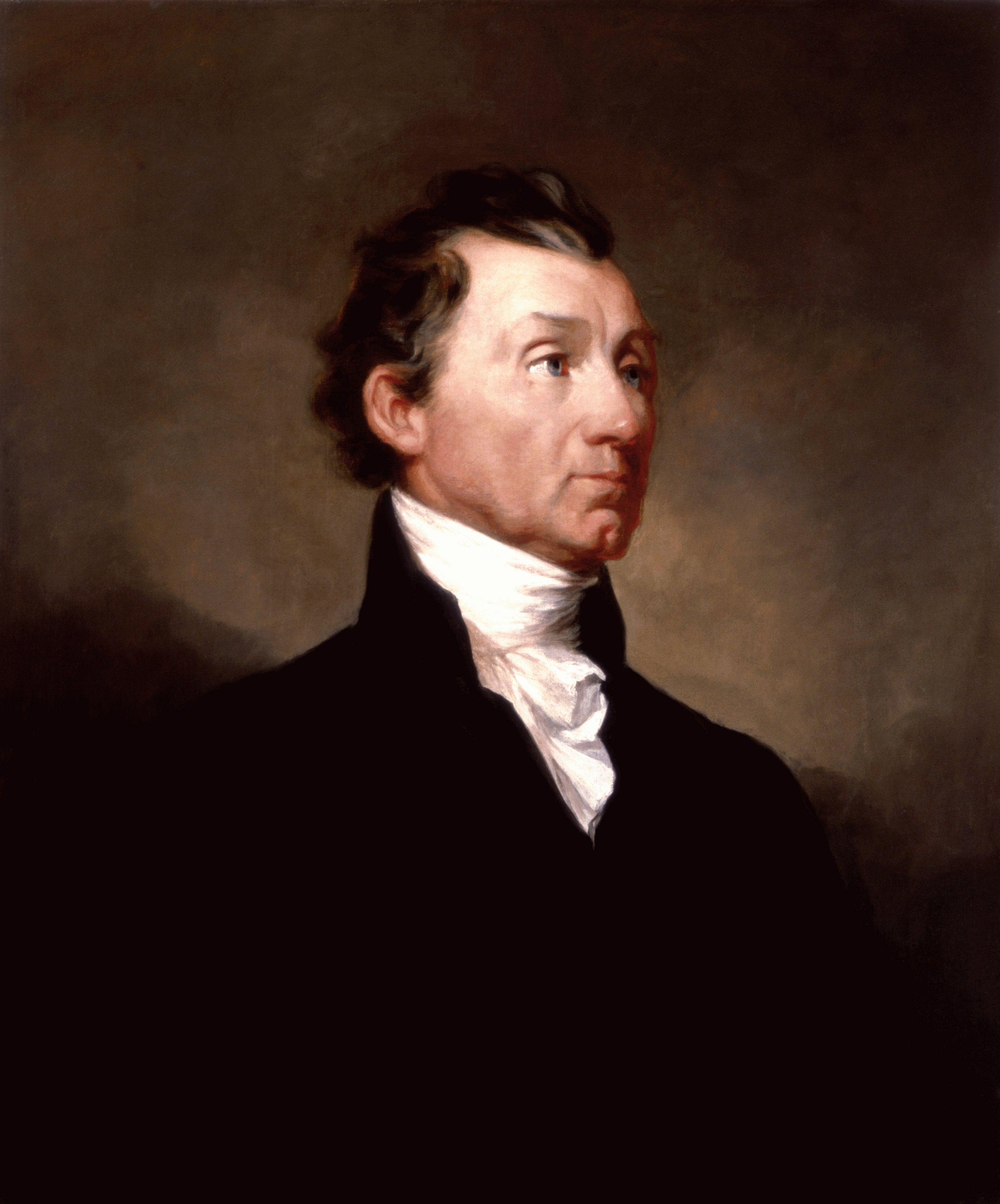
Nominee	James Monroe
Party	Democratic-Republican
Home state	Virginia
Running mate	Daniel D. Tompkins
Electoral vote	3
President before election
James Monroe
Democratic-Republican
Elected President
James Monroe
Democratic-Republican

The 1820 United States presidential election in Missouri took place between November 1 to December 6, 1820. The Missouri state legislature chose 3 electors, who voted for president and vice president. Missouri Territory was formed just after Louisiana was admitted to fill the old space of the Louisiana Purchase. In 1820, they split off a portion of Missouri Territory into what would become the new state of Missouri. However, the heated debate had begun after Congress could not decide whether its electoral votes in the upcoming election would count, or if it should be rejected and would vote in 1824. This debate would later be overshadowed with issues regarding the expansion of slavery out west, and whether Missouri would be a free or slave state. Eventually, the Missouri Compromise allowed Missouri to be a slave state, however, they could not admit any more states above a line marked by the new Arkansaw Territory. (Note: Arkansaw Territory was shortly after renamed to Arkansas Territory.)

On March 6, 1820, Congress passed a law directing Missouri to hold a convention to form a constitution and a state government. This law stated that "...the said state, when formed, shall be admitted into the Union, upon an equal footing with the original states, in all respects whatsoever." However, when Congress reconvened in November 1820, the admission of Missouri became an issue of contention. Proponents claimed that Missouri had fulfilled the conditions of the law and therefore it was a state; detractors contended that certain provisions of the Missouri Constitution violated the United States Constitution.

By the time Congress was due to meet to count the electoral votes from the election, this dispute had lasted over two months. The counting raised a ticklish problem: if Congress counted Missouri's votes, that would count as recognition that Missouri was a state; on the other hand, if Congress failed to count Missouri's vote, that would count as recognition that Missouri was not a state. Knowing ahead of time that Monroe had won in a landslide and that Missouri's vote would therefore make no difference in the final result, the Senate passed a resolution on February 13, 1821, stating that if a protest was made, there would be no consideration of the matter unless the vote of Missouri would change who would become president. Instead, the president of the Senate would announce the final tally twice, once with Missouri included and once with it excluded.

The next day this resolution was introduced in the full House. After a lively debate, it was passed. Nonetheless, during the counting of the electoral votes on February 14, 1821, an objection was raised to the votes from Missouri by Representative Arthur Livermore of New Hampshire. He argued that since Missouri had not yet officially become a state that Missouri had no right to cast any electoral votes. Immediately, Representative John Floyd of Virginia argued that Missouri's votes must be counted. Chaos ensued, and order was only restored with the counting of the vote as per the resolution and then adjournment for the day.

== Results ==
During this election, Missouri cast their votes for incumbent president James Monroe, and incumbent vice president Daniel D. Tompkins.

1820 United States presidential election in Missouri
Party	Candidate	Running mate	Percentage	Electoral votes
Democratic-Republican	James Monroe (incumbent)	Daniel D. Tompkins (incumbent)	100%	3

== See also ==
- United States presidential elections in Missouri
