= 1820 United States presidential election in New Hampshire =

- November 1 – December 6, 1820
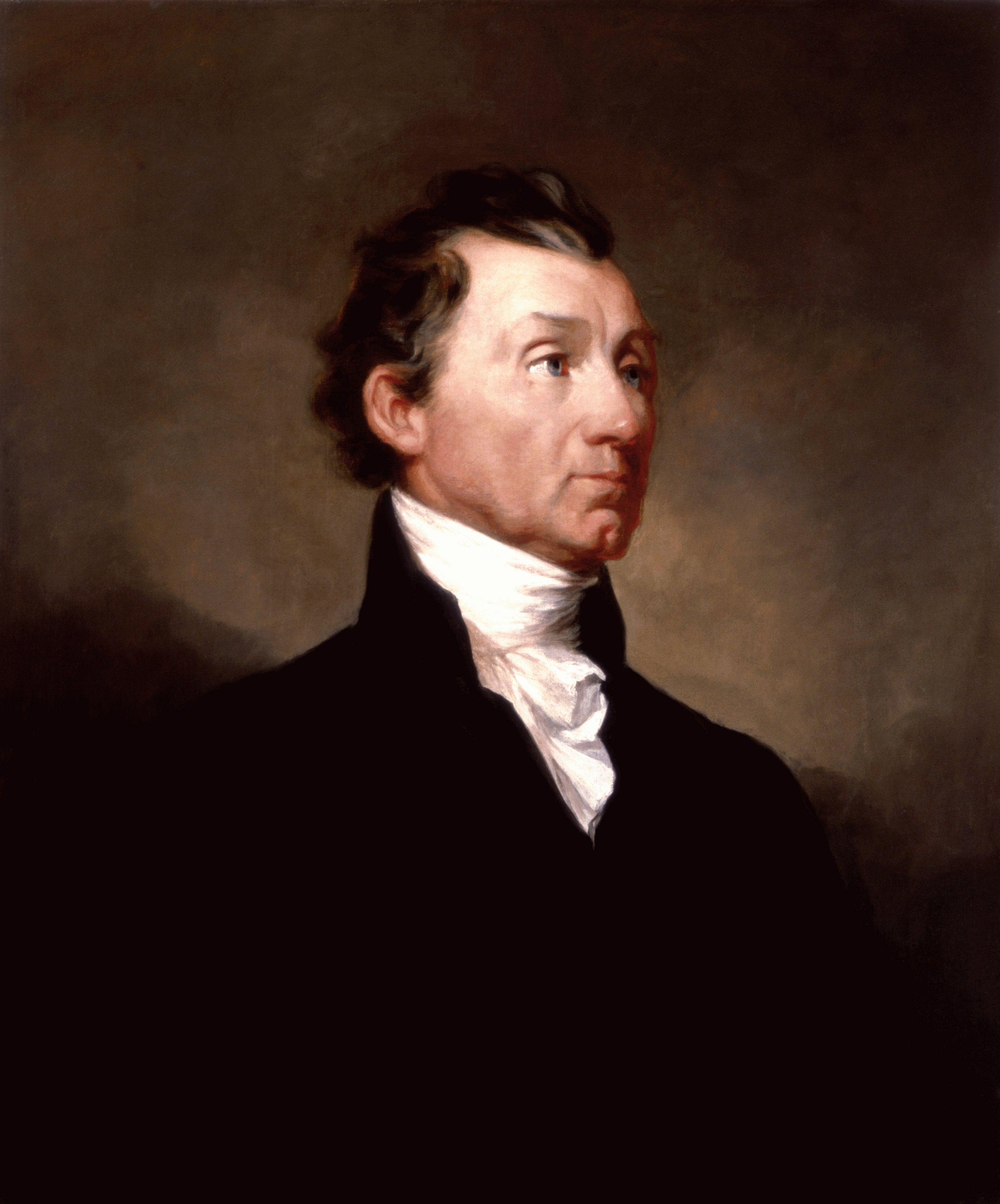

Nominee	James Monroe	Federalist electors
Party	Democratic-Republican	Federalist
Home state	Virginia	—
Running mate	Daniel D. Tompkins	N/A
Electoral vote	7 (Note: Monroe earned 8 pledged electoral votes, but received 7 votes due to a faithless elector, William Plumer, who voted for John Q. Adams.)	0
Popular vote	9,389	99
Percentage	98.96%	1.04%
County Results
Monroe
90-100%
President before election
James Monroe
Democratic-Republican
Elected President
James Monroe
Democratic-Republican

The 1820 United States presidential election in New Hampshire took place between November 1 and December 6, 1820, as part of the 1820 United States presidential election.

During this election, the Democratic-Republican Party was the only major national party, and its candidate of choice was James Monroe, the current president. New Hampshire's eight electors were chosen by voters statewide, and all of them voted for James Monroe and his running mate, Vice President Daniel D. Tompkins, except for William Plumer, who gave his electoral votes to John Quincy Adams and Richard Rush.

== Results ==
1820 United States presidential election in New Hampshire
Party	Candidate	Votes	Percentage	Electoral votes
Democratic-Republican	James Monroe (incumbent)	9,389	98.96%	7
Federalist	Unpledged electors	99	1.04%	0
Democratic-Republican	John Quincy Adams	N/A		1
Totals		9,389	100.0%	8

== See also ==
- United States presidential elections in New Hampshire
