= List of 1820 United States presidential electors =

This is a list of electors (members of the Electoral College) who cast ballots to elect the President of the United States and Vice President of the United States in the 1820 presidential election. The election was won by incumbent president James Monroe, with 231 (or 228) electoral votes, and incumbent vice president Daniel D. Tompkins, with 218 (or 215) votes.

A total of 235 men were elected to the Electoral College, but three—one each from Mississippi, Pennsylvania, and Tennessee—did not cast their ballots. At least two, Melchior Rahm and Duncan Stewart, had died before their state's electors voted; the disposition of the third is unclear.

In addition, the status of the three electors from Missouri was a matter of dispute. Congress had passed an enabling act directing Missouri to organize a state government and that "the said state, when formed, shall be admitted into the Union." The dispute was over whether Missouri's new state constitution fulfilled the requirements. In the end, two official vote totals were announced by Congress, one counting Missouri's votes and one not, with neither declared the canonical result — the source of debates over whether Monroe won 231 or 228 electoral votes. Missouri was not officially admitted as a state until August 10, 1821.

== Alabama ==
All 3 of Alabama's electors voted for James Monroe for president and Daniel D. Tompkins for vice president.

1. Henry Minor
2. George Phillips
3. John Scott

== Connecticut ==
All 9 of Connecticut's electors voted for Monroe and Tompkins.

1. John Alsop
2. Ebenezer Brockway
3. William Cogswell
4. Ingoldsby W. Crawford
5. Isaiah Loomis
6. William Moseley
7. Samuel H. Phillips
8. Henry Seymour
9. Samuel Welles

== Delaware ==
All four of Delaware's electors voted Monroe for president. For vice president, however, all four voted for Delaware Federalist Daniel Rodney, the only votes he received.

1. Andrew Barratt
2. John Clark
3. Nicholas Ridgely
4. Peter Robinson

== Georgia ==
All 8 of Georgia's electors voted for Monroe and Tompkins.

1. John Foster
2. John Graves
3. John MacIntosh
4. David Meriwether
5. Henry Mitchell
6. Oliver Porter
7. John Rutherford
8. Benjamin Whitaker

== Illinois ==
All 3 of Illinois's electors voted for Monroe and Tompkins.

1. Adolphus Hubbard
2. Michael Jones
3. James B. Moore

== Indiana ==
All 3 of Indiana's electors voted for Monroe and Tompkins.

1. Daniel J. Caswell
2. Nathaniel Ewing
3. John H. Thompson

== Kentucky ==
All 12 of Kentucky's electors voted for Monroe and Tompkins.

1. Jesse Bledsoe
2. Thomas Bodley
3. Samuel Caldwell
4. Ephraim M. Ewing
5. Martin D. Hardin
6. James Johnson
7. John E. King
8. Willis A. Lee
9. Samuel Murrel
10. John Pope
11. Hubbard Taylor
12. Richard Taylor

== Louisiana ==
All 3 of Louisiana's electors voted for Monroe and Tompkins.

1. John Randolph Grymes
2. Philemon Thomas
3. David L. Todd

== Maine ==
All 9 of Maine's electors voted for Monroe and Tompkins.

1. Elisha Allen
2. William Chadwick
3. Joshua Gage
4. Levi Hubbard
5. William Moody
6. Josiah Prescott
7. Lemuel Trescott
8. Samuel Tucker
9. Joshua Wingate, Jr.

== Maryland ==
All 11 of Maryland's electors voted Monroe for president. Ten voted Tompkins for vice president, but James Forrest cast his ballot for Maryland Federalist Robert Goodloe Harper.

1. John Boon
2. Robert W. Bowie
3. Elias Brown
4. James Forrest
5. John Forward
6. William Gabby
7. Alexander McKim
8. Joshua Prideaux
9. Michael Sprigg
10. John Stephen
11. William R. Stuart

== Massachusetts ==
All 15 of Massachusetts's electors voted Monroe for president. Seven of the 15 voted for Tompkins for vice president, but eight voted instead for New Jersey Federalist Richard Stockton, the only votes he received. No known record indicates which electors voted for each candidate.

1. John Adams
2. Thomas H. Blood
3. Benjamin Williams Crowninshield
4. Samuel Dana
5. John Davis
6. Wendell Davis
7. William Gray
8. John Heard
9. Ebenezer Mattoon
10. William Phillips
11. Jonas Sibley
12. Seth Sprague
13. Ezra Starkweather
14. Daniel Webster
15. Joseph Woodbridge

== Mississippi ==
Two of Mississippi's 3 electors voted for Monroe and Tompkins. Elector Duncan Stewart died on November 26, 1820, before casting his ballot.

1. Daniel Burnet
2. Theodore Stark
3. Duncan Stewart (died before voting)

== Missouri ==
All 3 of Missouri's electors voted for Monroe and Tompkins, though whether they should be counted—Missouri would not be formally admitted as a state for several more months—was an unsettled matter of dispute.

1. John S. Brickey
2. William Christy
3. William Shannon

== New Hampshire ==
Seven of New Hampshire's 8 electors voted for Monroe and Tompkins. Faithless elector William Plumer cast his ballot for Secretary of State John Quincy Adams for president and Pennsylvania Federalist Richard Rush for vice president.

1. David Barker, Jr.
2. Ezra Bartlett
3. Samuel Dinsmoor
4. William Fisk
5. John Pendexter
6. William Plumer
7. Nathaniel Shannon
8. James Smith

== New Jersey ==
All 8 of New Jersey's electors voted for Monroe and Tompkins.

1. Joseph Budd
2. John Crowell
3. David Mills
4. Isaiah Shinn
5. John L. Smith
6. Samuel L. Southard
7. Aaron Vansyckel
8. John Wilson

== New York ==
All 29 of New York's electors voted for Monroe and Tompkins.

1. John Baker
2. James Brisban
3. Latham A. Burrows
4. Jonathan Collins
5. Gilbert Eddy
6. William Floyd
7. Howell Gardner
8. David Hammond
9. Elisha Harnham
10. Abel Huntington
11. Benjamin Knower
12. Issac Lawrence
13. Edward P. Livingston
14. Daniel MacDougall
15. Peter Millikin
16. Samuel Nelson
17. Jacob Odell
18. William B. Rochester
19. Henry Rutgers
20. Edward Severich
21. Mark Spencer
22. Farrand Stranahan
23. Philetus Swift
24. John Targee
25. Charles Thompson
26. Henry Wager
27. John Walworth
28. Peter Waring
29. Seth Wetmore

== North Carolina ==
All 15 of North Carolina's electors voted for Monroe and Tompkins.

1. Benjamin H. Covington
2. Jesse Franklin
3. Alexander Gray
4. John Hall
5. Charles E. Johnson
6. Kimborough Jones
7. Thomas S. Kenan
8. Francis Locke
9. Robert Love
10. Michael MacLeary
11. James Mebane
12. George Outlaw
13. Abraham Phillips
14. Henry J. G. Ruffin
15. Lewis D. Wilson

== Ohio ==
All 8 of Ohio's electors voted for Monroe and Tompkins.

1. James Caldwell
2. Alexander Campbell
3. Lewis Dille
4. William Henry Harrison
5. James Kilbourne
6. Robert Lucas
7. John MacLaughlin
8. Jeremiah Morrow

== Pennsylvania ==
All 25 Pennsylvania electors were pledged to Monroe and Tompkins, but only 24 ended up casting ballots. Former state senator Melchior Rahm was chosen as an elector, but he died on the day Pennsylvania electors were scheduled to vote, October 31, 1820.

1. George Barnitz
2. Philip Benner
3. William Clinghan
4. Paul Cox
5. Pierce Crosby
6. Hugh Davis
7. Daniel W. Dingam
8. Patrick Farrelly
9. Andrew Gilkerson
10. James Griffen
11. Daniel Groves
12. John Hamilton
13. George Hebb
14. Gabriel Hiester
15. Joseph Huston
16. James Kerr
17. Thomas Leiper
18. John Miley
19. William Mitchell
20. George Plumer
21. Chandler Price
22. James P. Sanderson
23. Andrew Sutton
24. John Todd
25. Melchior Rahm (died before voting)

== Rhode Island ==
All 4 of Rhode Island's electors voted for Monroe and Tompkins.

1. Dutee Arnold
2. James Fenner
3. Robert F. Noyes
4. Dutee J. Pearce

== South Carolina ==
All 11 of South Carolina's electors voted for Monroe and Tompkins.

1. Lewis M. Ayer
2. William A. Ball
3. Rasha Cannon
4. Benjamin Dickson
5. John Dunovant
6. John S. Glascock
7. Benjamin James
8. Matthew J. Kirth
9. Charles Miller
10. Benjamin Rynalds
11. Isaac Smith

== Tennessee ==
Seven of Tennessee's 8 electors voted for Monroe and Tompkins. For reasons that remain unclear, no elector voted for the state's fourth elector district.

1. David Campbell
2. Alfred M. Carter
3. Joseph Dickson
4. Joseph Hamilton, Sr.
5. German Lester
6. Henry Small
7. John J. White

== Vermont ==
All 8 of Vermont's electors voted for Monroe and Tompkins.

1. D. Azro A. Buck
2. Ezra Butler
3. Gilbert Denison
4. James Galusha
5. Aaron Leland
6. William Slade, Jr.
7. Pliny Smith
8. Timothy Stanley

== Virginia ==
All 25 of Virginia's electors voted for Monroe and Tompkins.

1. Branch T. Archer
2. William Armstrong
3. Samuel Blackburn
4. William Brockenbrough
5. John T. Brook
6. Thomas Brown
7. John Edie
8. Charles H. Graves
9. Hugh Holmes
10. William C. Holt
11. Armistead Hoomes
12. James Hunter
13. William Jones
14. Joseph Martin
15. John Pegram
16. John Purnall
17. William Cabell Rives
18. Andrew Russell
19. Archibald Rutherford
20. Robert Shields
21. Robert B. Stark
22. Archibald Stuart
23. John Taliaferro
24. Robert Taylor
25. Charles Yancey

| Preceded by 1816 | Electoral College (United States); 1820 | Succeeded by 1824 |
