= Senator Cogswell =

Senator Cogswell may refer to:

- Charles A. Cogswell (1844–1908), Oregon State Senate
- John B. D. Cogswell (1829–1889), Massachusetts State Senate
- William Henry Cogswell (1798–1876), Connecticut State Senate

== See also ==
- Amos Coggswell (1825–1892), Minnesota State Senate
