= 1824 United States presidential election in New York =

- November 11, 1824
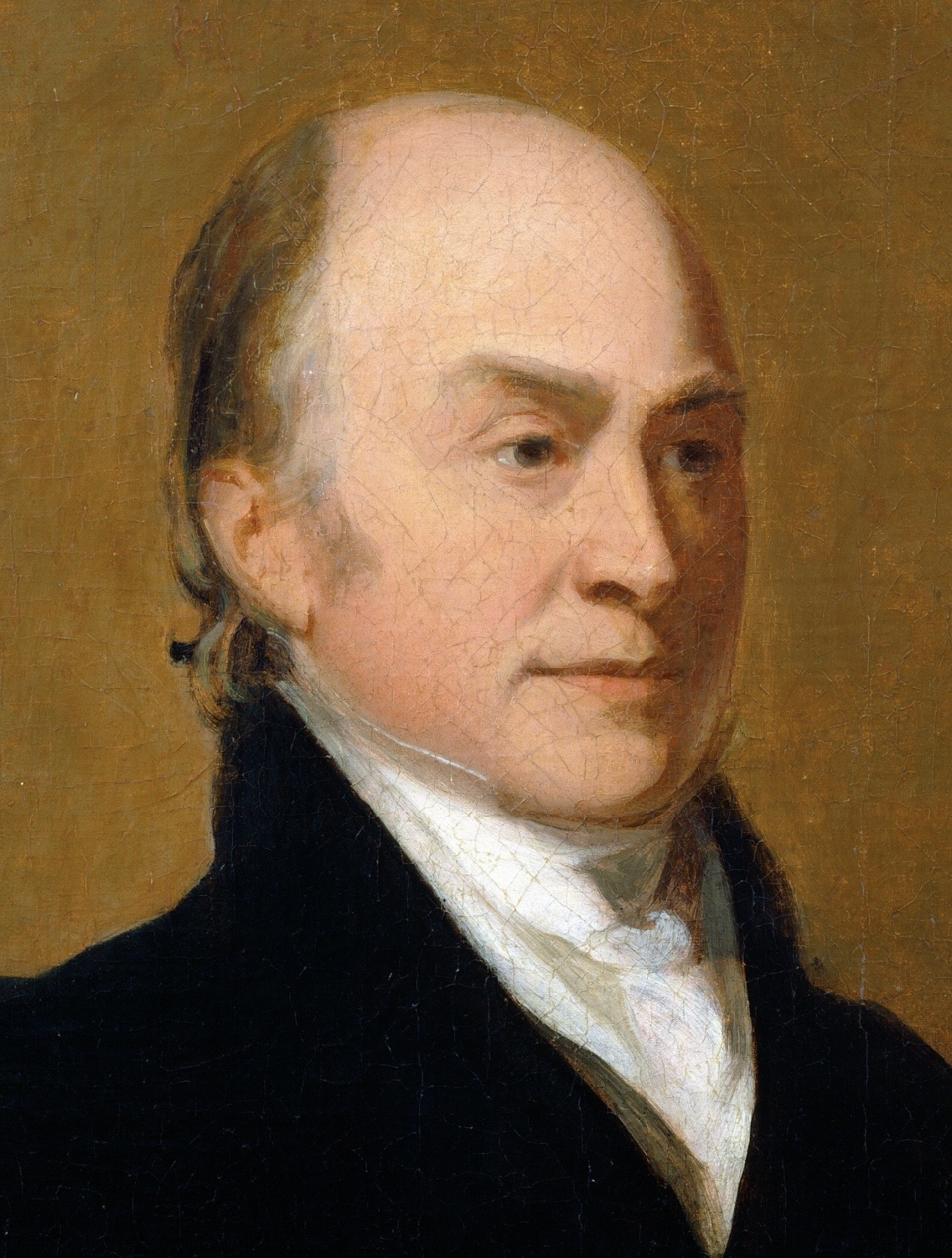

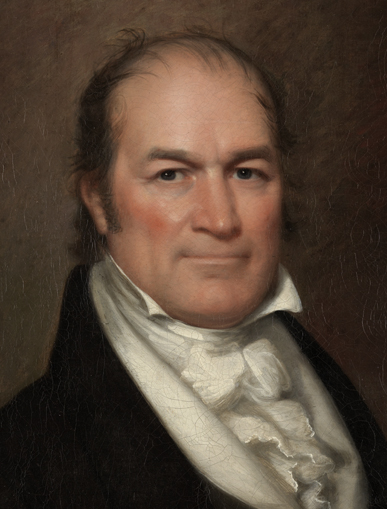

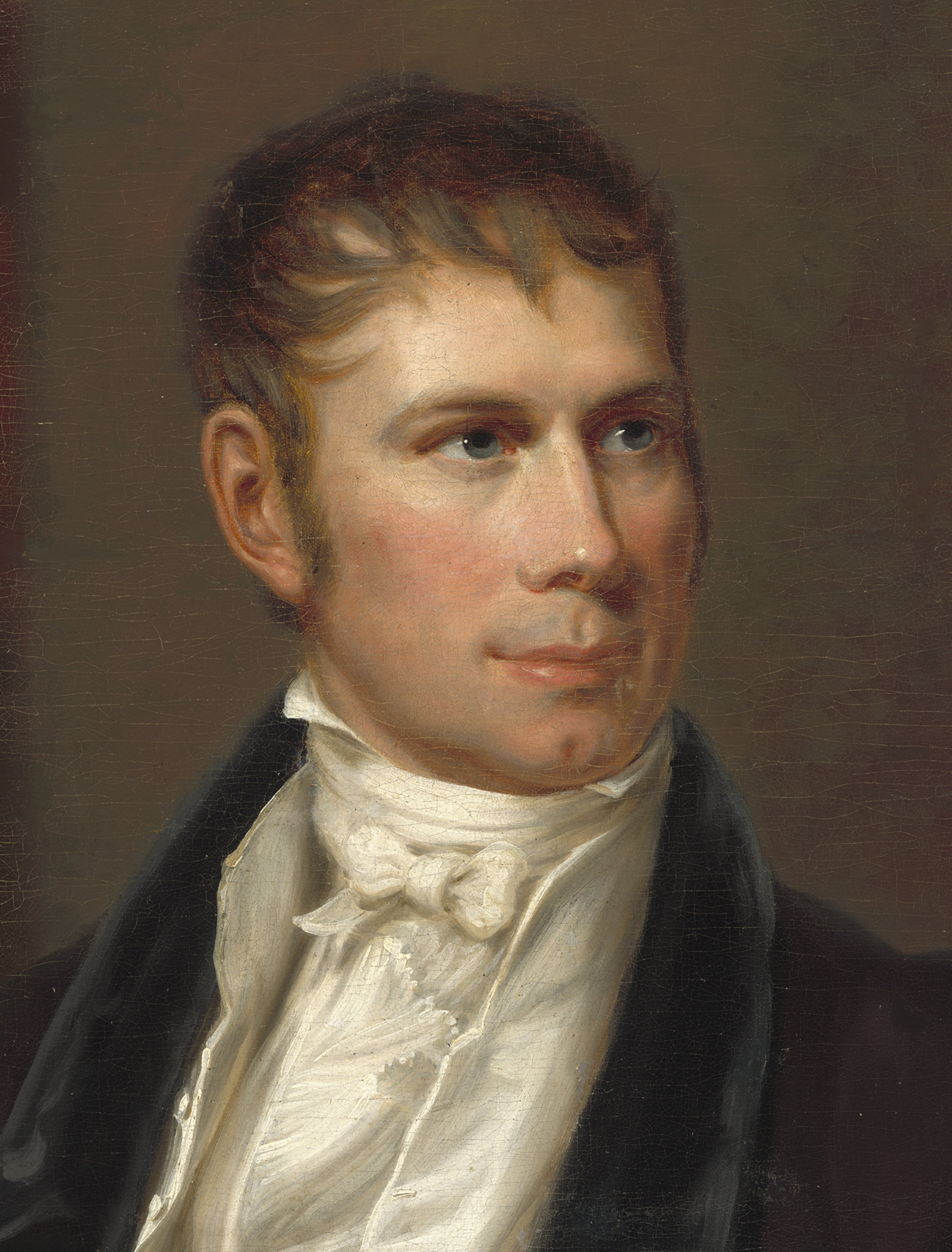

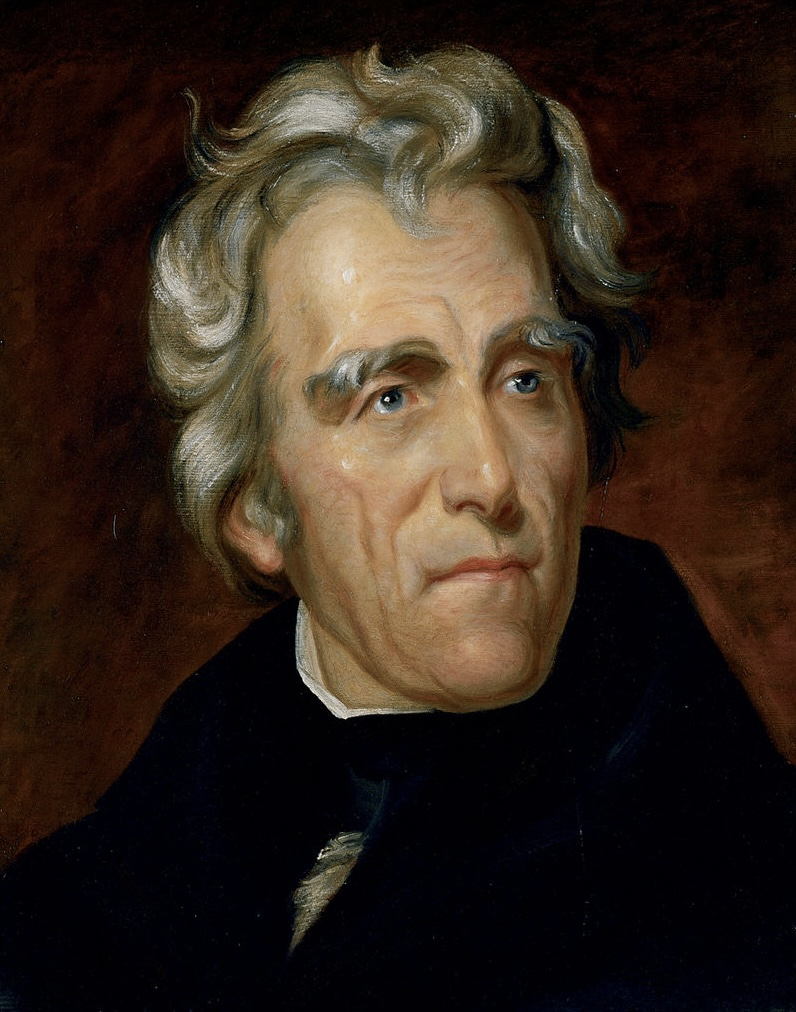
Nominee	John Quincy Adams	William H. Crawford
Party	Democratic-Republican	Democratic-Republican
Alliance	Adams-Clay Republican	Old Republican
Home state	Massachusetts	Georgia
Running mate	John C. Calhoun	Nathaniel Macon
Electoral vote	26	5
Nominee	Henry Clay	Andrew Jackson
Party	Democratic-Republican	Democratic-Republican
Alliance	Adams-Clay Republican	Jacksonian
Home state	Kentucky	Tennessee
Running mate	Nathan Sanford	John C. Calhoun
Electoral vote	4	1
President before election
James Monroe
Democratic-Republican
Elected President
John Quincy Adams
Democratic-Republican

The 1824 United States presidential election in New York took place on November 11, 1824, as part of the 1824 United States presidential election. The state legislature chose 36 representatives, or electors to the Electoral College, who voted for President and Vice President.

During this election, the Democratic-Republican Party was the only major national party, and 4 different candidates from this party sought the Presidency. New York cast 26 electoral votes for John Quincy Adams, 5 for William H. Crawford, 4 for Henry Clay and 1 for Andrew Jackson. John C. Calhoun received 29 votes for vice president and Nathan Sanford received 7 votes. This election marks the last time the New York State Legislature chose the state's electors as opposed to using some form of popular vote method.

== Results ==
1824 United States presidential election in New York
Party	Candidate	Electoral votes
Democratic-Republican	John Quincy Adams	26
Democratic-Republican	William H. Crawford	5
Democratic-Republican	Henry Clay	4
Democratic-Republican	Andrew Jackson	1
Totals		36

== See also ==
- United States presidential elections in New York
