= 1796 United States presidential election in Maryland =

- 1796
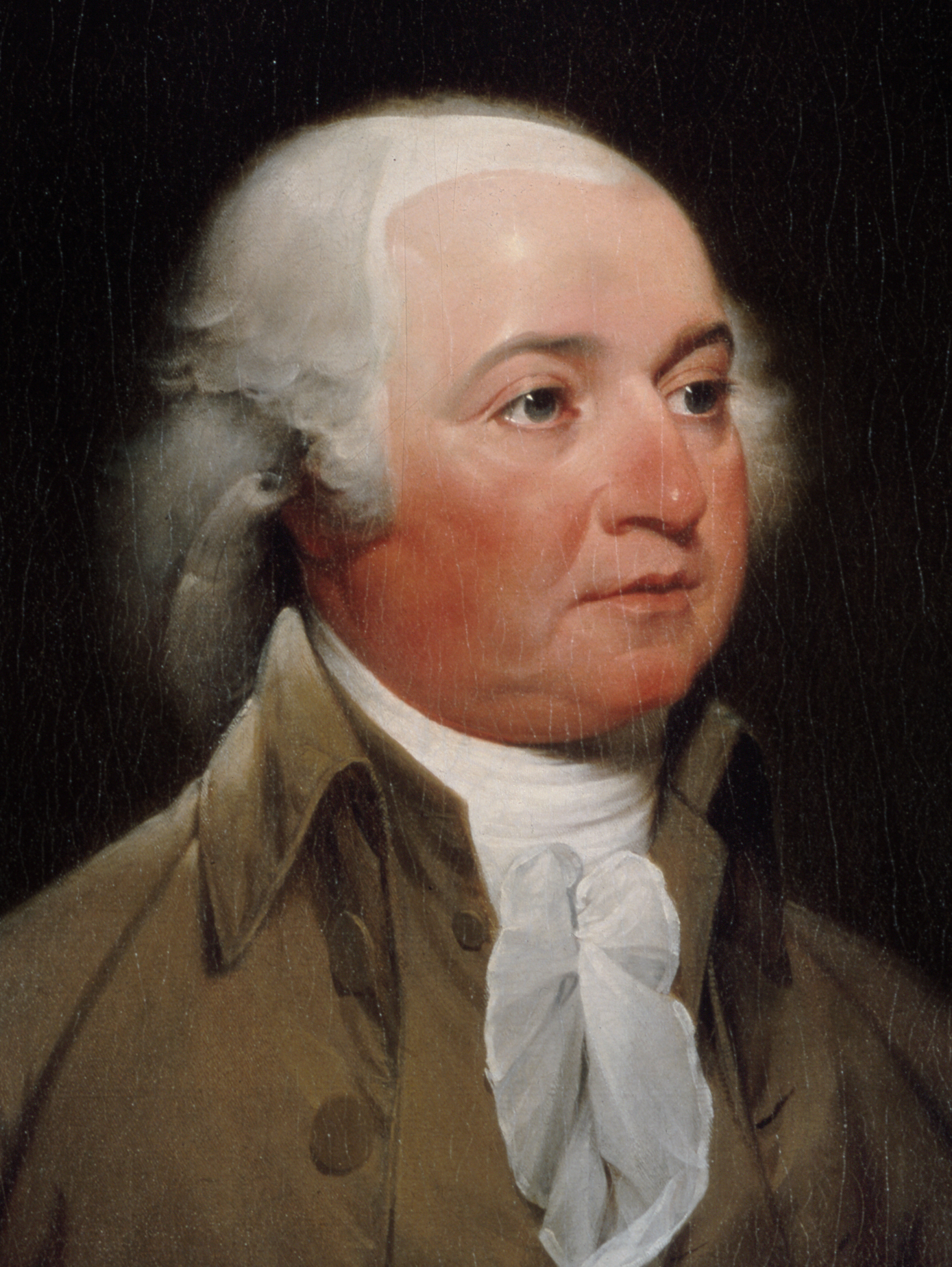

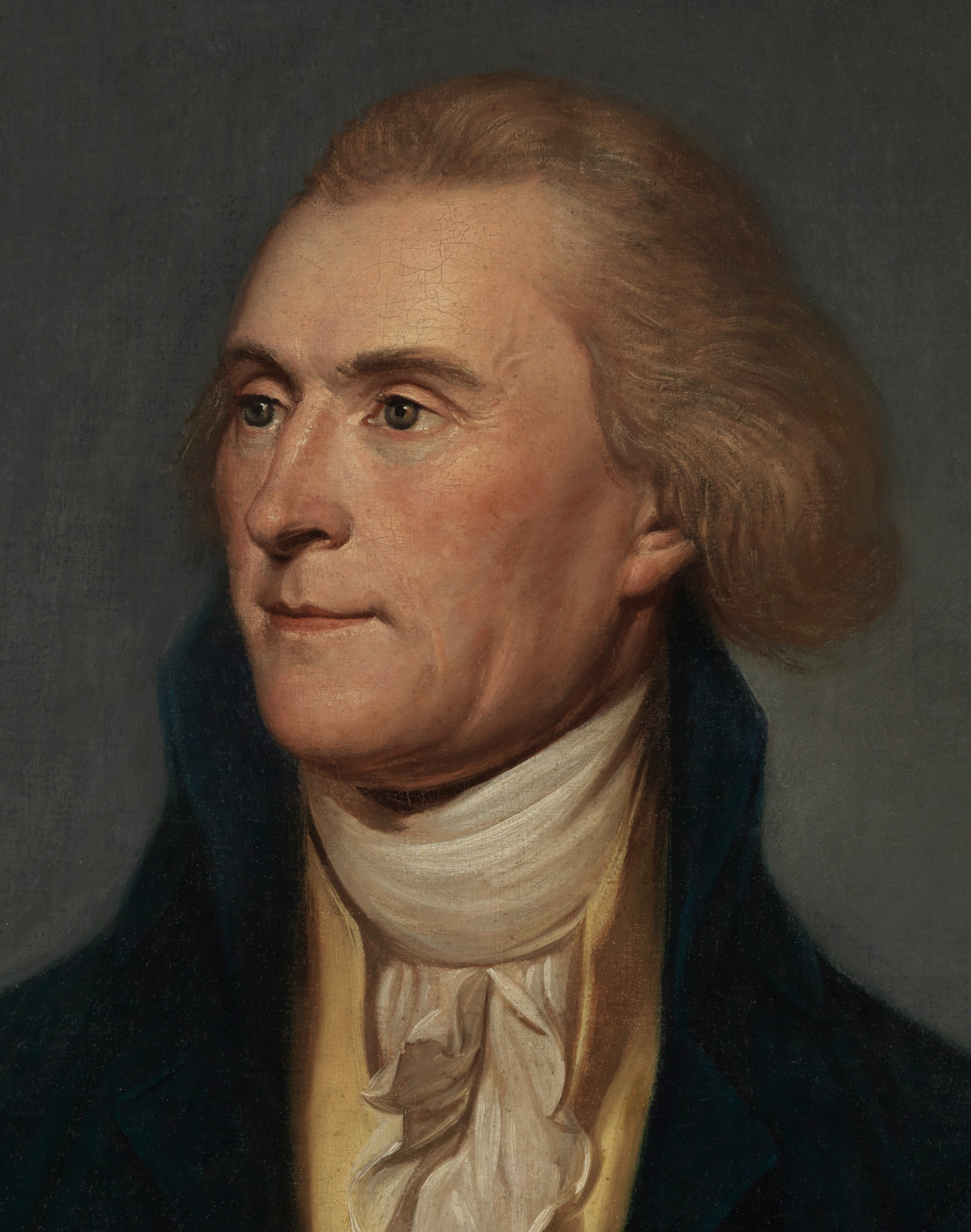
Nominee	John Adams	Thomas Jefferson
Party	Federalist	Democratic-Republican
Home state	Massachusetts	Virginia
Electoral vote	7	4
Popular vote	7,466	6,490
Percentage	53.50%	46.50%
County results
Adams
50–60%
60–70%
70–80%
80–90%
90–100%
Jefferson
50–60%
60–70%
70–80%
80–90%
90–100%
President before election
George Washington
Independent
Elected President
John Adams
Federalist

A presidential election was held in Maryland on an unknown date in 1796, as part of the 1796 presidential election. Voters chose ten representatives, or electors, to the Electoral College, who voted for president and vice president.

Early elections were quite different from modern ones. Voters voted for individual electors, who were pledged to vote for certain candidates. Often, which candidate an elector intended to support was unclear. Prior to the ratification of the 12th amendment, each elector did not distinguish between a vote cast for president and vice president and simply cast two votes. Due to this feature, one Maryland elector voted for both John Adams and Thomas Jefferson.

Starting with this election and ending with the 1824 United States presidential election, Maryland used an electoral district system to choose its electors, with each district electing a single elector. This is similar to the way Nebraska and Maine choose their electors in modern elections.

== Results ==
1796 United States presidential election in Maryland
Party	Candidate	Votes	%
Federalist	John Adams	7,466	53.50%
Democratic-Republican	Thomas Jefferson	6,490	46.50%
Total votes		13,956	100.00%

=== Results by county ===
1796 United States presidential election in Maryland
County	John Adams Federalist		Thomas Jefferson Democratic-Republican		Margin		Total (Note: Direct results for John Adams and Thomas Jefferson are taken from all electors with either a formal ticket pledge, or a submitted electoral vote, for each county.)
County	#	%	#	%	#	%	Total
Allegany	646	99.54%	3	0.46%	643	99.08%	649
Anne Arundel	86	22.05%	304	77.95%	-218	-55.90%	390
Baltimore	504	68.95%	227	31.05%	277	37.90%	731
Baltimore Town	236	30.81%	530	69.19%	-294	-38.38%	766
Calvert	266	100.00%	0	0.00%	266	100.00%	266
Caroline	69	42.59%	93	57.41%	-24	-14.82%	162
Cecil	48	12.24%	344	87.76%	-296	-75.52%	392
Charles	271	61.31%	171	38.69%	100	22.62%	442
Dorchester	582	99.83%	1	0.17%	581	99.66%	583
Frederick	1,121	58.48%	796	41.52%	325	16.96%	1,917
Harford	47	7.61%	571	92.39%	-524	-84.78%	618
Kent	232	29.97%	542	70.03%	-310	-40.06%	774
Montgomery	943	71.98%	367	28.02%	576	43.96%	1,310
Prince George's	469	38.25%	757	61.75%	-288	-23.50%	1,226
Queen Anne's	183	34.01%	355	65.99%	-172	-31.98%	538
St. Mary's	419	100.00%	0	0.00%	419	100.00%	419
Somerset	24	100.00%	0	0.00%	24	100.00%	24
Talbot	489	84.17%	92	15.83%	397	68.34%	581
Washington	698	34.30%	1,337	65.70%	-639	-31.40%	2,035
Worcester	133	100.00%	0	0.00%	133	100.00%	133
Total	7,466	53.50%	6,490	46.50%	976	7.00%	13,956

==== Results by county swing ====
Swing compared to the 1792 election
County	Party		Status
County	Federalist	Democratic-Republican	Status
County	± pp	± pp	Status
Allegany	▼0.46 pp	▲0.46 pp	Loss
Anne Arundel	▼27.95 pp	▲27.95 pp	Gain
Baltimore	▼1.05 pp	▲1.05 pp	Loss
Baltimore Town	▼67.02 pp	▲67.02 pp	Flip
Calvert	0.00 pp	0.00 pp	Hold
Caroline	▼10.86 pp	▲10.86 pp	Flip
Cecil	▼37.76 pp	▲37.76 pp	Gain
Charles	▼38.69 pp	▲38.69 pp	Loss
Dorchester	▼0.17 pp	▲0.17 pp	Loss
Frederick	▼37.44 pp	▲37.44 pp	Loss
Harford	▼92.39 pp	▲92.39 pp	Flip
Kent	▼52.61 pp	▲52.61 pp	Flip
Montgomery	▼4.94 pp	▲4.94 pp	Loss
Prince George's	▼61.75 pp	▲61.75 pp	Flip
Queen Anne's	▼37.73 pp	▲37.73 pp	Flip
St. Mary's	▲13.64 pp	▼13.64 pp	Gain
Somerset	0.00 pp	0.00 pp	Hold
Talbot	▲12.88 pp	▼12.88 pp	Gain
Washington	▼65.70 pp	▲65.70 pp	Flip
Worcester	No data	No data	N/A
Total	▼25.13 pp	▲25.13 pp	Loss

=== Results by district ===
1796 United States presidential election in Maryland
District	E.V.	John Adams Federalist			Thomas Jefferson Democratic-Republican			Margin		Total (Note: Direct results for John Adams and Thomas Jefferson are taken from all electors with either a formal ticket pledge, or a submitted electoral vote, for each district.) (Note: An unknown elector voted for both John Adams and Thomas Jefferson.)
District	E.V.	#	%	E.V.	#	%	E.V.	#	%	Total
1st	1	956	84.83%	1	171	15.17%	0	785	69.66%	1,127
2nd	1	1,412	55.68%	1	1,124	44.32%	0	288	11.36%	2,536
3rd	1	1,121	58.48%	1	796	41.52%	0	325	16.95%	1,917
4th	1	1,344	50.07%	1	1,340	49.93%	0	4	0.15%	2,684
5th	1	322	27.85%	0	834	72.15%	1	-512	-44.29%	1,156
6th	1	551	40.85%	0	798	59.15%	1	-247	-18.31%	1,349
7th	1	280	24.01%	0	886	75.99%	1	-606	-51.97%	1,166
8th	1	672	60.05%	1	447	39.95%	0	225	20.11%	1,119
9th	1	651	87.38%	1	94	12.62%	0	557	74.77%	745
10th	1	157	100.00%	1	0	0.00%	0	157	100.00%	157
Total	10	7,466	53.50%	7	6,490	46.50%	4	976	7.00%	13,956

=== Results by elector ===
1796 United States presidential election in Maryland's 1st congressional district
Party	Candidate	Votes	%
Federalist	John R. Plater	519	46.05%
Federalist	John Campbell	437	38.78%
Democratic-Republican	John Mitchell	171	15.17%
Total votes		1,127	100.00%

1796 United States presidential election in Maryland's 2nd congressional district
Party	Candidate	Votes	%
Federalist	Francis Deakins	1,412	55.68%
Democratic-Republican	John Mason	1,124	44.32%
Unknown	David Crawford	—	—
Unknown	Walter Bowie	—	—
Unknown	William Deakins	—	—
Total votes		2,536	100.00%

1796 United States presidential election in Maryland's 3rd congressional district
Party	Candidate	Votes	%
Federalist	George Murdock	1,121	58.48%
Democratic-Republican	John Tyler	796	41.52%
Total votes		1,917	100.00%

1796 United States presidential election in Maryland's 4th congressional district
Party	Candidate	Votes	%
Federalist	John Lynn	1,344	50.07%
Democratic-Republican	Adam Ott	1,340	49.93%
Total votes		2,684	100.00%

1796 United States presidential election in Maryland's 5th congressional district
Party	Candidate	Votes	%
Democratic-Republican	Gabriel Duvall	834	72.15%
Federalist	Charles Carroll	322	27.85%
Total votes		1,156	100.00%

1796 United States presidential election in Maryland's 6th congressional district
Party	Candidate	Votes	%
Democratic-Republican	John Archer	798	59.15%
Federalist	John E. Howard	551	40.85%
Total votes		1,349	100.00%

1796 United States presidential election in Maryland's 7th congressional district
Party	Candidate	Votes	%
Democratic-Republican	John Gilpin	886	75.99%
Federalist	Lambert Beard	280	24.01%
Total votes		1,166	100.00%

1796 United States presidential election in Maryland's 8th congressional district
Party	Candidate	Votes	%
Federalist	John Roberts	672	60.05%
Democratic-Republican	Robert Wright	447	39.95%
Total votes		1,119	100.00%

1796 United States presidential election in Maryland's 9th congressional district
Party	Candidate	Votes	%
Federalist	John Eccleston	651	87.38%
Democratic-Republican	William Whiteley	94	12.62%
Total votes		745	100.00%

1796 United States presidential election in Maryland's 10th congressional district
Party	Candidate	Votes	%
Federalist	John Done	157	100.00%
Total votes		157	100.00%

== See also ==
- United States presidential elections in Maryland
- 1796 United States presidential election
- 1796 United States elections
