= List of 1824 United States presidential electors =

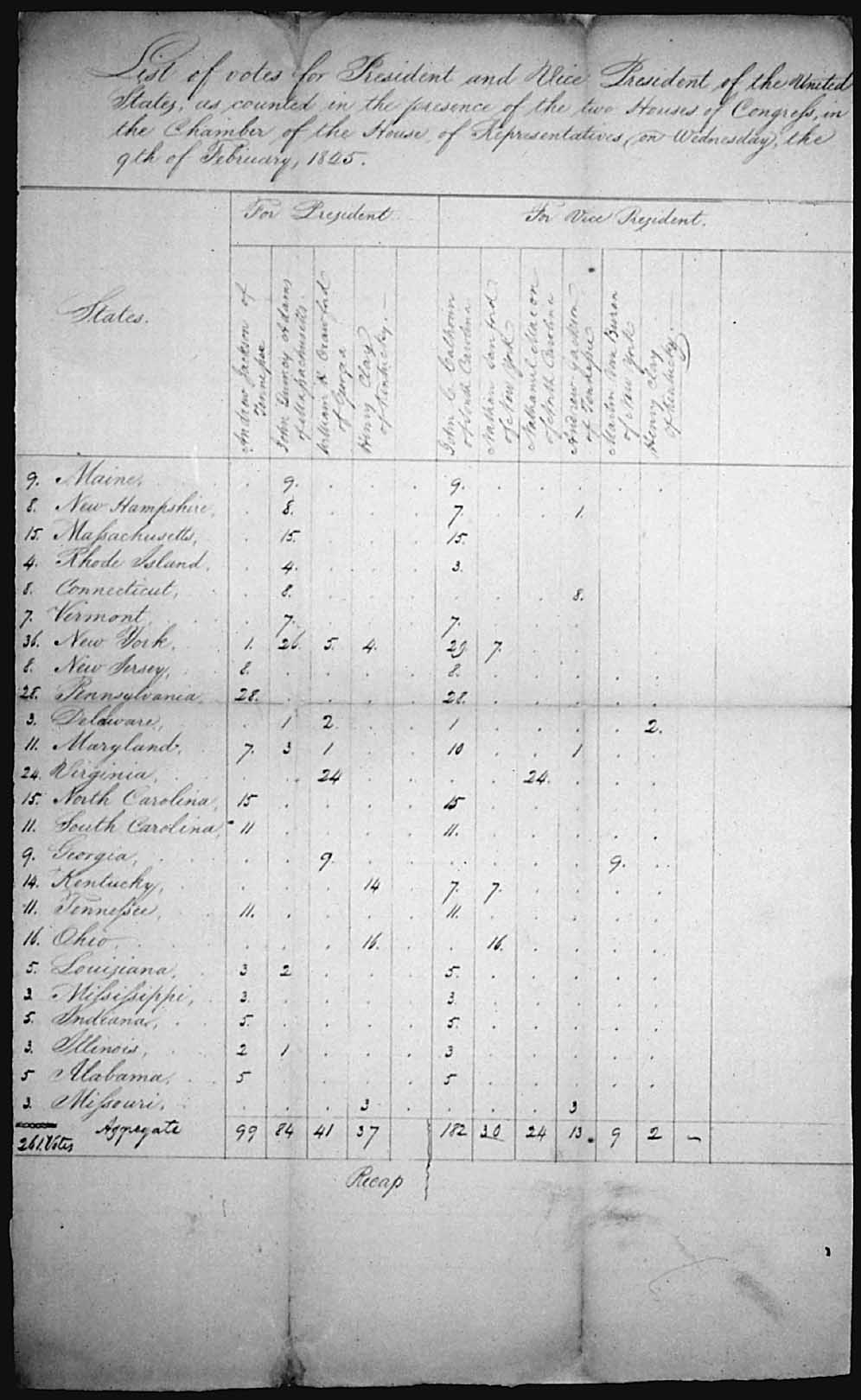
The House of Representatives' official tally of the Electoral College county, February 9, 1825.

This is a list of electors (members of the Electoral College) who cast ballots to elect the President of the United States and Vice President of the United States in the 1824 presidential election.

Of the 261 electoral votes cast, 99 went to Andrew Jackson of Tennessee, 84 to John Quincy Adams of Massachusetts, 41 to William H. Crawford of Georgia, and 37 to Henry Clay of Kentucky. All were members of the Democratic-Republican Party.

For the second time in United States history, no presidential candidate won a majority of the Electoral College, throwing the race to a contingent election in the U.S. House of Representatives. (Vice presidential candidate John C. Calhoun did win a majority in the Electoral College and did not face a similar contingent election in the U.S. Senate.) While Andrew Jackson had led in both the popular and electoral vote, the House of Representatives voted to name John Quincy Adams president.

In the contingent election, seven states' House delegations voted for a candidate who had not won all or most of their state's electoral votes. Illinois, Louisiana, and Maryland each went for Jackson in the Electoral College, but Adams in the House. North Carolina gave all 15 of its electoral votes to Jackson, but its House delegation voted for Crawford. Kentucky, Missouri, and Ohio all favored Clay in the Electoral College but Adams in the House. (The rules for contingent elections allowed only the top three in the electoral vote to advance, leaving Clay out. He threw his support to Adams, who later named Clay his secretary of state. Jackson partisans labeled this a "corrupt bargain.")

Jackson's plurality was a result of the Three-fifths Compromise, which let slave states count 60% of its enslaved population in calculating its House representation, thus inflating their share of Electoral College votes. If only the free population of states had been counted, Adams would have edged Jackson 83 to 77.

Unusually, two candidates — Jackson and Clay — received electoral votes for both president and vice president.

The two vice presidential votes for Martin Van Buren meant this Electoral College cast votes for the sixth (Adams), seventh (Jackson), and eighth (Van Buren) presidents. Jackson, angered at having been denied the 1824 election, ran again against Adams in 1828 and defeated him handily. He won reelection against Clay in 1832, with Van Buren as his running mate. Van Buren was then elected president in 1836 before losing reelection to William Henry Harrison in 1840.

== Alabama ==
All 5 of Alabama's electors voted for Andrew Jackson for president and John C. Calhoun for vice president.

1. Henry H. Chambers
2. William Fleming
3. James Hill
4. John Murphy
5. Reuben Saffold

== Connecticut ==
All 8 of Connecticut's electors voted for John Quincy Adams for president and Andrew Jackson for vice president.

1. David Hill
2. Rufus Hitchcock
3. David Keyes
4. John Swathel
5. Moses Warren
6. Lemuel White
7. Calvin Willey
8. Oliver Wolcott Jr.

== Delaware ==
Two of Delaware's electors voted for William H. Crawford for president, while one voted for John Quincy Adams. For vice president, Henry Clay received two electoral votes — the only ones he received for vice president — while John C. Calhoun received one. There is no known record indicating which electors voted for which. However, a news account describing the three men's selection by the Delaware General Assembly listed Rowland as an Adams supporter, Tunnell as a Crawford supporter, and Caldwell as a Clay supporter.

1. John Caldwell
2. Joseph G. Rowland
3. Isaac Tunnell

== Georgia ==
All 9 of Georgia's electors voted for William H. Crawford for president and Martin Van Buren for vice president. These were the only electoral votes Van Buren received.

1. Elias Beall
2. Thomas Cumming
3. John Floyd
4. John Harden
5. Warren Jourdan
6. John MacIntosh
7. William Matthews
8. John Rutherford
9. William Terrell

== Illinois ==
Two Illinois electors, Henry Eddy and Alexander Pope Field, voted for Andrew Jackson, while William Harrison voted for John Quincy Adams. (Harrison should not be confused with future president William Henry Harrison, who was an 1824 elector from Ohio.) All three voted for John C. Calhoun as vice president.

1. Henry Eddy
2. Alexander Pope Field
3. William Harrison

== Indiana ==
All five Indiana electors voted for Andrew Jackson and John C. Calhoun.

1. John Carr
2. Jonathan MacCarty
3. Elias McNamee
4. Samuel Milroy
5. David Robb

== Kentucky ==
For president, Kentucky's 14 electors voted for Henry Clay. For vice president, they cast seven votes each for John C. Calhoun and Nathan Sanford. There is no known record indicating which electors voted for which.

1. Joseph Allen
2. Thomas Bodley
3. John J. Crittenden
4. Young Ewing
5. Joshua Fry
6. John E. King
7. Benjamin J. Letcher
8. Alney McLean
9. William Moore
10. Duval Payne
11. James Smiley
12. Hubbard Taylor
13. Richard Taylor
14. Joseph R. Underwood

== Louisiana ==
Three Louisiana electors — Sebastian Hiriart, Pierre Lacoste, and Jean Baptiste Plauché — voted for Andrew Jackson for president. Two — William Nott and James H. Shepherd — voted for John Quincy Adams. All five voted for John C. Calhoun for vice president.

1. Sebastian Hiriart
2. Pierre Lacoste
3. William Nott
4. Jean Baptiste Plauché
5. James H. Shepherd

== Maine ==
All 9 Maine electors cast ballots for John Quincy Adams and John C. Calhoun.

1. James Campbell
2. Benjamin Chandler
3. Thomas Fillebrown
4. Nathaniel Hobbs
5. Benjamin Nourse
6. James Parker
7. Stephen Parsons
8. Joshua Taylor
9. Lemuel Trescott

== Maryland ==
Seven Maryland electors — William Brown, Dennis Claude, Thomas Hope, Samuel G. Osborn, Thomas Post, William Tyler, and George Winchester — voted for Andrew Jackson for president. Three — Henry Brawner, Littleton Dennis, and John C. Herbert — voted for John Quincy Adams. One, James Sangston, voted for William H. Crawford. For vice president, 10 of the 11 electors voted for John C. Calhoun, with the 11th choosing Andrew Jackson. There is no known record indicating which elector chose Jackson for vice president, though Herbert is described in contemporary news coverage as a Jackson/Calhoun supporter who was elected from an Adams-majority district as a result of two Adams candidates splitting the vote.

1. Henry Brawner
2. William Brown
3. Dennis Claude
4. Littleton Purnell Dennis
5. John C. Herbert
6. Thomas Hope
7. Samuel G. Osborn
8. Thomas Post
9. James Sangston
10. William Tyler
11. George Winchester

== Massachusetts ==
All 15 Massachusetts electors voted for John Quincy Adams and John C. Calhoun.

1. Hezekiah Barnard
2. Edmund Cushing
3. Jonathan Davis
4. John Endicott
5. Enos Foot
6. William Gray
7. Cornelius Grinnell
8. Joseph Kettredge
9. Levi Lincoln Jr.
10. Nathaniel Silsbee
11. Oliver Smith
12. Augustus Towar
13. William Walker
14. Thomas Weston
15. Thomas L. Winthrop

== Mississippi ==
All three Mississippi electors voted for Andrew Jackson and John C. Calhoun.

1. Bartlett C. Barry
2. Thomas Hinds
3. James Patton

== Missouri ==
All three Missouri electors voted for Henry Clay for president and Andrew Jackson for vice president.

1. James Logan
2. David Musick
3. David Todd

== New Hampshire ==
For president, all 8 New Hampshire electors voted for John Quincy Adams. For vice president, seven voted for John C. Calhoun while one voted for Andrew Jackson. There is no known record indicating which elector chose Jackson for vice president.

1. William Badger
2. Josiah Bartlett Jr.
3. Hall Burgin
4. William Fisk
5. Caleb Keith
6. Abel Parker
7. Samuel Quarles
8. Moses White

== New Jersey ==
All 8 New Jersey electors voted for Andrew Jackson and John C. Calhoun.

1. John Buck
2. James Cook
3. Joseph Kille
4. Jacob Kline
5. James Parker
6. Joseph W. Scott
7. Daniel Vliet
8. Peter Wilson

== New York ==
For president, New York's electors cast 26 votes for John Quincy Adams, 5 votes for William H. Crawford, 4 votes for Henry Clay, and 1 vote for Andrew Jackson. For vice president, they cast 29 votes for John C. Calhoun and 7 for Nathan Sanford. (There were two different electors named Isaac Sutherland — one from Dutchess County and one from Genesee County.

There is no known record indicating which electors voted for which candidate in either race, but in news coverage before the vote, the men's preferences were listed as follows: Adams supporters (25): Blanvelt, Coffin, Coon, Clark Crandall, Edward Crandall, Dorr, James Drake, John Drake, Hicks, Lawyer, Mooers, Patterson, Sage, Savage, Azariah Smith, Benjamin Smith, Burnham, St. John, Stagg, Strong, Sutherland (Dutchess), Sutherland (Genesee), Townsend, Walsh, and Willet; Clay supporters (7): Barker, Bentley, Brooks, Porter, Russell, Sibley, and Thompson; Crawford supporters (4): Bailey, Cady, Lansing, and Samuel Smith.

Most records list Ebenezer Sage and Timothy H. Porter as electors, but contemporary news reports say neither one appeared on the day of the state's Electoral College vote. Sage sent a letter stating that "through age and ill health, he was unable to attend" the proceedings. The other electors selected John Taylor and William Mann to fill their positions, and the two men cast votes in Sage's and Taylor's place.

1. Benjamin Bailey
2. Pierre A. Barker
3. Darius Bentley
4. Richard Blauvelt
5. Micah Brooks
6. Eleazer Burnham
7. Heman Cady
8. Alexander J. Coffin
9. Phineas Coon
10. Clark Crandall
11. Edward B. Crandall
12. Elisha Dorr
13. James Drake
14. John R. Drake
15. Samuel Hicks
16. John Lansing Jr.
17. Thomas Lawyer
18. Benjamin Mooers
19. Chester Patterson
20. Timothy H. Porter (did not vote, substitute chosen)
21. Samuel Russell
22. Ebenezer Sage (did not vote, substitute chosen)
23. Solomon St. John
24. Edward Savage
25. Joseph Sibley
26. Azariah Smith
27. Benjamin Smith
28. Samuel Smith
29. Abraham Stagg
30. Elisha Beebe Strong
31. Isaac Sutherland
32. Isaac Sutherland
33. Nathan Thompson
34. William Townsend
35. William Walsh
36. Marinus Willett

== North Carolina ==
All 15 North Carolina electors voted for Andrew Jackson and John C. Calhoun.

1. Vine Allen
2. William A. Blount
3. Josiah Crudup
4. William Drew
5. Edward Bishop Dudley
6. Peter Forney
7. John Giles
8. Walter J. Leake
9. William B. Lockhart
10. Robert Love
11. William Martin
12. James Mebane
13. John Motley Morehead
14. Augusta H. Shepperd
15. Montfort Stokes

== Ohio ==
All 16 Ohio electors voted for Henry Clay and Nathan Sanford.

1. John Bigger
2. Henry Brown
3. Ebenezer Buckingham
4. James Caldwell
5. James Cooley
6. Samuel Coulter
7. William Henry Harrison
8. James Heaton
9. William Kendall
10. Solomon Kingsbury
11. Thomas Kirker
12. William McFarland
13. Ebenezer Merry
14. William Skinner
15. David Sloane
16. James Steele

== Pennsylvania ==
Pennsylvania electors cast 28 votes for Andrew Jackson and John C. Calhoun. (One elector, Isaac Smith, was unable to make the vote due to illness; his fellow electors selected James Clarke to vote in his place.)

1. Abraham Addams
2. Peter Addams
3. James Ankrim
4. William Beatty
5. Philip Benner
6. John Boyd
7. James Clarke (replaced Isaac Smith)
8. James Duncan
9. Joseph Engle
10. John Fogel
11. Valentine Giesey
12. Charles Kenny
13. Adam King
14. Thomas Leiper
15. Adam Light
16. Alexander MacCaraher
17. Asa Mann
18. James Murry
19. Cromwell Pearce
20. Philip Peltz
21. John Pugh
22. Daniel Raub
23. John Reed
24. Adam Ritscher
25. John Rush
26. Henry Scheetz
27. Daniel Sheffer
28. William Thomson

== Rhode Island ==
For president, all four Rhode Island electors voted for John Quincy Adams. For vice president, three electors voted for John C. Calhoun and the fourth did not cast a ballot. There is no record of which elector that was.

1. Stephen B. Cornell
2. Caleb Earle
3. Charles Eldridge
4. Elisha Watson

== South Carolina ==
All 11 South Carolina electors voted for Andrew Jackson and John C. Calhoun.

1. Joseph W. Alston
2. Evan Benbow
3. Thomas Benson
4. Robert Clendinen
5. William Garrett
6. John K. Griffin
7. Matthew J. Keith
8. William Laval
9. Angus Patterson
10. William C. Pinckney
11. Eldred Simkins

== Tennessee ==
All 11 Tennessee electors voted for Andrew Jackson and John C. Calhoun.

1. William E. Anderson
2. Willie Blount
3. Joseph Brown
4. Robert H. Dyer
5. Samuel E. Hogg
6. Tilghman Howard
7. William Mitchell
8. Joel Pinson
9. John Rhea
10. B.C. Stout
11. William A. Sublett

== Vermont ==
Vermont's 7 electors voted for John Quincy Adams and John C. Calhoun.

1. Asa Aldis
2. Joseph Burr
3. Dan Carpenter
4. Jonas Galusha
5. Titus Hutchinson
6. John Mason
7. Jabez Procter

== Virginia ==
All 24 Virginia electors voted for William H. Crawford for president and Nathaniel Macon for vice president. These were the only votes Macon received.

1. William Armstrong
2. John Bowyer
3. William Brockenbrough
4. William Henry Brodnax
5. John Cargill
6. Ellison Currie
7. Isaac Foster
8. Charles H. Graves
9. James Hoge
10. William C. Holt
11. James Jones
12. William Jones
13. William Martency
14. Joseph Martin
15. Daniel Morgan
16. Thomas Mann Randolph Jr.
17. Andrew Russell
18. Archibald Rutherford
19. Joseph H. Samuels
20. Robert Shield
21. John T. Somax
22. Robert Taylor
23. Joseph Wyatt
24. Charles Yancey

Preceded by 1820	Electoral College (United States); 1824	Succeeded by 1828
