= 1824 United States presidential election in Maryland =

- October 26 – December 2, 1824
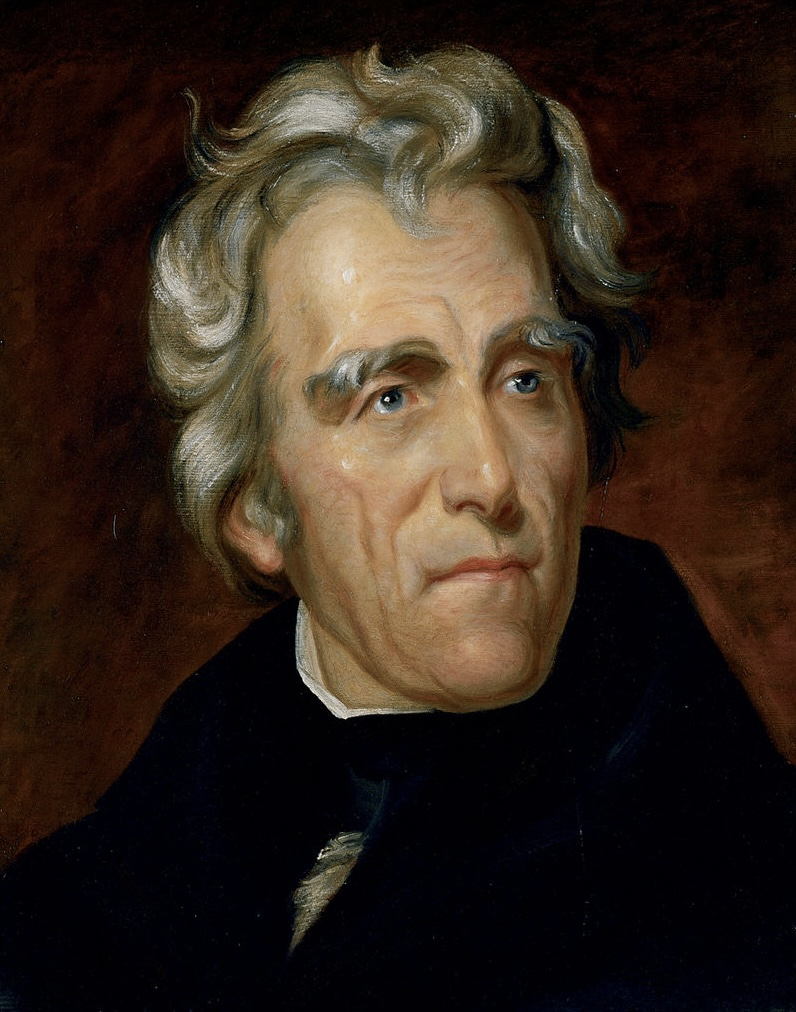

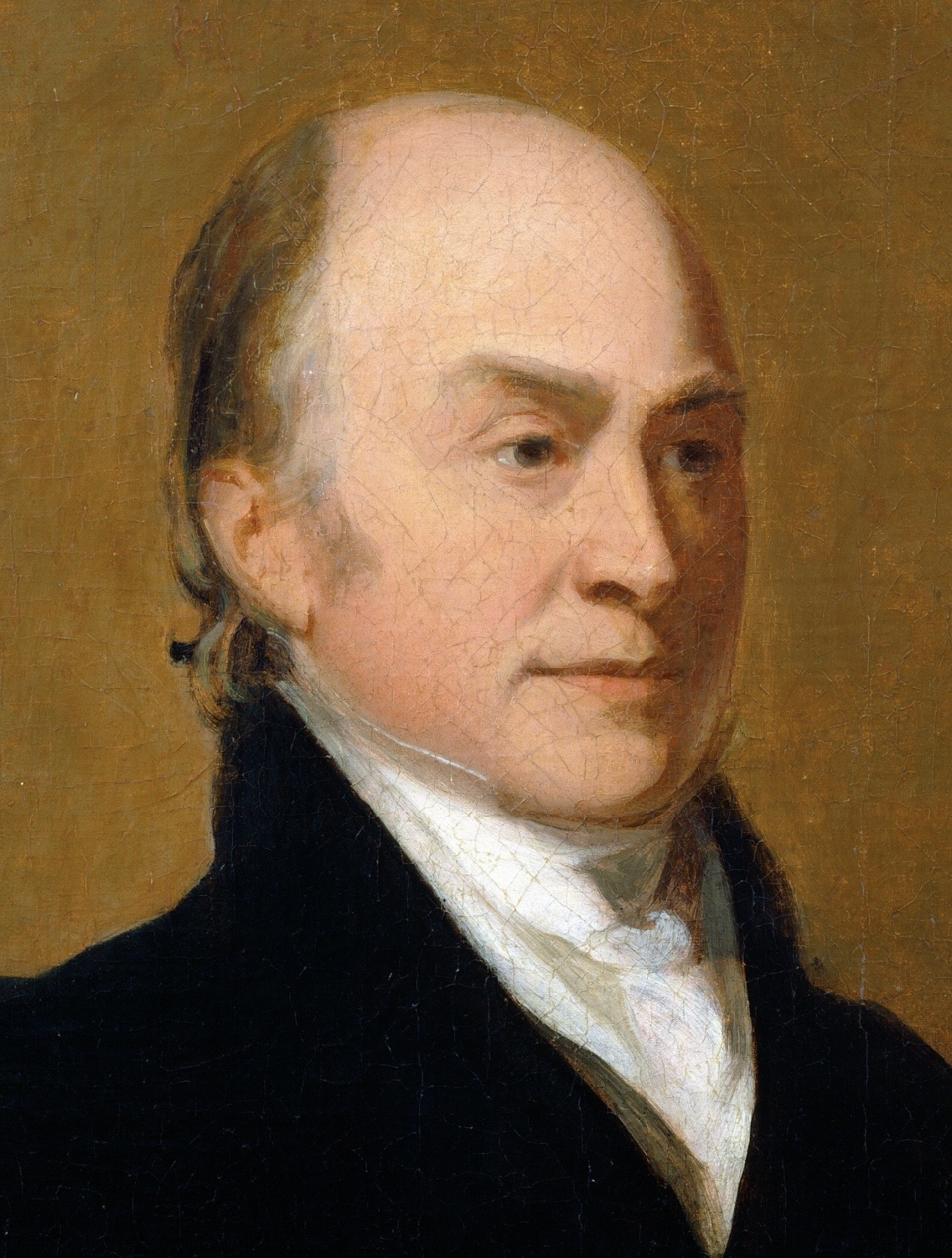

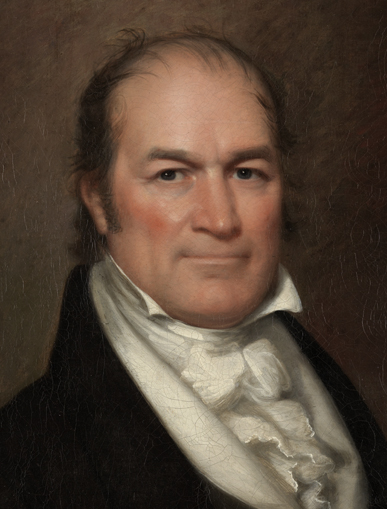
Nominee	Andrew Jackson	John Quincy Adams	William H. Crawford
Party	Democratic-Republican	Democratic-Republican	Democratic-Republican
Home state	Tennessee	Massachusetts	Georgia
Running mate	John C. Calhoun	John C. Calhoun	Nathaniel Macon
Electoral vote	7	3	1
Popular vote	14,523	14,632	3,364
Percentage	43.73%	44.05%	10.13%
County results
Jackson
40–50%
50–60%
60–70%
Adams
40–50%
50–60%
60–70%
70–80%
Crawford
50–60%
President before election
James Monroe
Democratic-Republican
Elected President
John Quincy Adams
Democratic-Republican

The 1824 United States presidential election in Maryland took place between October 26 and December 2, 1824, as part of the 1824 United States presidential election. Voters chose 11 representatives, or electors to the Electoral College, who voted for President and Vice President.

During this election, the Democratic-Republican Party was the only major national party, and four different candidates from this party sought the Presidency. Although Maryland voted for John Quincy Adams over Andrew Jackson, William H. Crawford and Henry Clay, only three electoral votes were assigned to Adams, while Jackson received seven and Crawford received one. Adams won Maryland by a very narrow margin of 0.32%.

Starting with the 1796 United States presidential election and ending with this election, Maryland used an electoral district system to choose its electors, with each district electing a single elector. This is similar to the way Nebraska and Maine choose their electors in modern elections.

== Results ==
1824 United States presidential election in Maryland
Party	Candidate	Votes	Percentage	Electoral votes
Democratic-Republican	Andrew Jackson	14,523	43.73%	7
Democratic-Republican	John Quincy Adams	14,632	44.05%	3
Democratic-Republican	William H. Crawford	3,364	10.13%	1
Democratic-Republican	Henry Clay	695	2.09%	0
Totals		33,214	100.0%	11

=== Results by electoral district ===
Results by District
District	Andrew Jackson Democratic-Republican			John Quincy Adams Democratic-Republican			William H. Crawford Democratic-Republican			Henry Clay Democratic-Republican			Margin		Total votes cast
District	#	%	Electors	#	%	Electors	#	%	Electors	#	%	Electors	#	%	Total votes cast
1	482	27.54%	0	878	50.17%	1	390	22.28%	0	0	0.00%	0			1,750
2	628	40.99%	1	518	33.81%	0	386	25.19%	0	0	0.00%	0			1,532
3	4,836	52.29%	2	4,398	47.56%	0	13	0.15%	0	0	0.00%	0			9,247
4	3,724	51.79%	2	2,751	38.26%	0	20	0.29%	0	695	9.66%	0			7,190
5	1,936	66.48%	1	976	33.52%	0	0	0.00%	0	0	0.00%	0			2,912
6	1,360	51.92%	1	1,259	48.08%	0	0	0.00%	0	0	0.00%	0			2,619
7	817	46.31%	0	896	50.79%	1	51	2.90%	0	0	0.00%	0			1,764
8	75	2.78%	0	1,216	45.07%	0	1,407	52.15%	1	0	0.00%	0			2,698
9	679	21.93%	0	1,302	42.02%	1	1,117	36.05%	0	0	0.00%	0			3,098
Total	14,523	43.73%	7	14,632	44.05%	3	3,364	10.13%	1	695	2.09%	0			33,214

=== Results by county ===
County	Andrew Jackson Democratic-Republican		John Quincy Adams Democratic-Republican		Willian H. Crawford Democratic-Republican		Henry Clay Democratic-Republican		Margin		Total votes cast
County	#	%	#	%	#	%	#	%	#	%	Total votes cast
Allegany	364	63.75%	69	12.08%	7	1.23%	131	22.97%	295	51.66%	571
Anne Arundel	790	47.56%	868	52.26%	3	0.18%	0	0.00%	-78	-4.70%	1,661
Baltimore (City and County)	5,840	59.47%	3,980	40.53%	0	0.00%	0	0.00%	1,860	18.94%	9,820
Calvert	83	22.62%	255	69.48%	29	0.00%	0	7.90%	-172	-46.87%	367
Caroline	0	0.00%	317	31.51%	689	68.49%	0	0.00%	-317	-31.51%	1,006
Cecil	703	54.20%	594	45.80%	0	0.00%	0	0.00%	109	8.40%	1,297
Charles	299	36.42%	403	49.09%	119	14.49%	0	0.00%	-104	-12.67%	821
Dorchester	318	30.99%	411	40.06%	297	28.95%	0	0.00%	-93	-9.06%	1,026
Frederick	2,002	46.83%	1,882	44.02%	0	0.00%	391	9.15%	120	2.81%	1,275
Harford	657	49.70%	665	50.30%	0	0.00%	0	0.00%	-8	-0.61%	1,322
Kent	298	37.82%	469	59.52%	21	2.66%	0	0.00%	-171	-21.70%	788
Montgomery	325	28.89%	698	62.04%	102	9.07%	0	0.00%	-373	-33.16%	1,125
Prince George's	411	41.31%	243	24.42%	341	34.27%	0	0.00%	168	16.88%	995
Queen Anne's	455	49.89%	427	46.82%	30	3.29%	0	0.00%	28	3.07%	912
St. Mary's	135	18.39%	414	56.40%	185	25.20%	0	0.00%	-279	-38.01%	734
Somerset	191	17.40%	619	56.38%	288	26.23%	0	0.00%	-428	-38.98%	1,098
Talbot	2	0.16%	747	60.00%	496	39.87%	0	0.00%	-745	-59.84%	1,245
Washington	1,359	58.18%	800	34.25%	0.17	4%	173	7.41%	559	23.93%	2,336
Worcester	243	17.14%	421	29.69%	741	53.17%	0	0.00%	-178	-12.55%	1,418
Total	14,523	43.73%	14,632	44.05%	3,364	10.13%	695	2.09%	109	0.32%	33,214

==== Counties that flipped from Federalist to Democratic-Republican ====
- Charles
- St. Mary's

== See also ==
- United States presidential elections in Maryland
- 1824 United States presidential election
- 1824 United States elections
