= C. Henry Orth =

American politician (1773–1816)

Personal details
- Born: Chrisian Henry Orth; 1773 Lebanon, Pennsylvania
- Died: 1816 (aged 42–43) Baltimore, Maryland
- Parent(s): Catharine Kucher (mother); Adam Orth (father)

Christian Henry Orth (1773–1816) was an American politician.

== Early life ==
Christian Henry Orth was born in Lebanon, Pennsylvania, to parents Adam Orth and Catharine Kucher on 24 March 1773. Orth was apprenticed to an ironworker and took control of the New Market Forge upon his father's death.

== Career ==
He served as sheriff of Dauphin County in 1797 and was a Democratic-Republican member of the Pennsylvania Senate for Dauphin and Berks county from 1801 to 1802. In 1809, Simon Snyder appointed Orth as the flour inspector for the Port of Philadelphia. After the War of 1812 ended, Orth moved to Baltimore, Maryland, where he died in 1816. Orth was married to Rebecca Rahm from 1797 until his death. Rebecca Rahm's brother Melchior Rahm also served on the Pennsylvania Senate.
