= Melchior Rahm =

American politician

Melchior Rahm (13 February 1762 – 31 October 1820) was an American politician.

Melchior Rahm was born on 13 February 1762 to parents Conrad and Maria (Weiser) Rahm. Melchior Rahm served with the 6th Battalion of the Lancaster County Revolutionary War Militia. In 1804, he was sheriff of Dauphin County. During the War of 1812, Rahm returned to military service as a quartermaster. He ran the Franklin House in Harrisburg, as well as the Pennsylvania Inn.

Rahm was a Democratic-Republican member of the Pennsylvania Senate for Dauphin and Berks counties between 1805 and 1814. His sister Rebecca married C. Henry Orth in 1797. Melchior Rahm was married to Sarah Knapp and died in Harrisburg on 31 October 1820.
