= William Henry Cogswell =

American politician

William Henry Cogswell (December 3, 1798 – November 22, 1876) was an American medical doctor.

== Early life ==
Cogswell was the eldest child of Colonel William and Mercy Cogswell (née Brewster). He was born on December 3, 1798, in Preston, Connecticut, which is now included in the town of Griswold. Cogswell was employed on his father's farm until he entered Yale Medical School, from which he graduated M.D. in 1823.

== Career ==
Immediately upon receiving his degree he settled in Plainfield, Connecticut, at first in partnership with Dr. Josiah Fuller. After two or three years he established a separate medical office and continued to practice there until his death in 1876.

In 1830 he represented Plainfield in the Connecticut Legislature, and in 1860 was elected as a member of the Connecticut State Senate for district 13. For nearly three years during the American Civil War, he was a special agent, appointed by the Governor, to care for the sick and wounded soldiers of Connecticut regiments on the field or in the hospitals.

== Personal life ==
In 1824 he married Mary Lord Fuller, daughter of Dr. Josiah Fuller, and had three children. After her death he married again in 1829, to Lucretia A. Payne, of Canterbury, Connecticut, who survived him and with whom he had five children. He died in Plainfield on November 22, 1876, aged 78.
