= Maria of Romania =

Maria of Romania may refer to:

- Marie of Romania (1875–1938), queen of Romania from 1914 to 1927 as the wife of King Ferdinand I
- Maria of Yugoslavia (1900–1961), queen of Yugoslavia and daughter of King Ferdinand I of Romania
- Princess Maria of Romania (1870–1874), daughter of King Carol I
- Princess Maria of Romania (born 1964), daughter of King Michael I
