= Carmen Sylva forest path =

Trail in Opatija, Croatia

Coordinates: 45°20′00″N 14°17′50″E

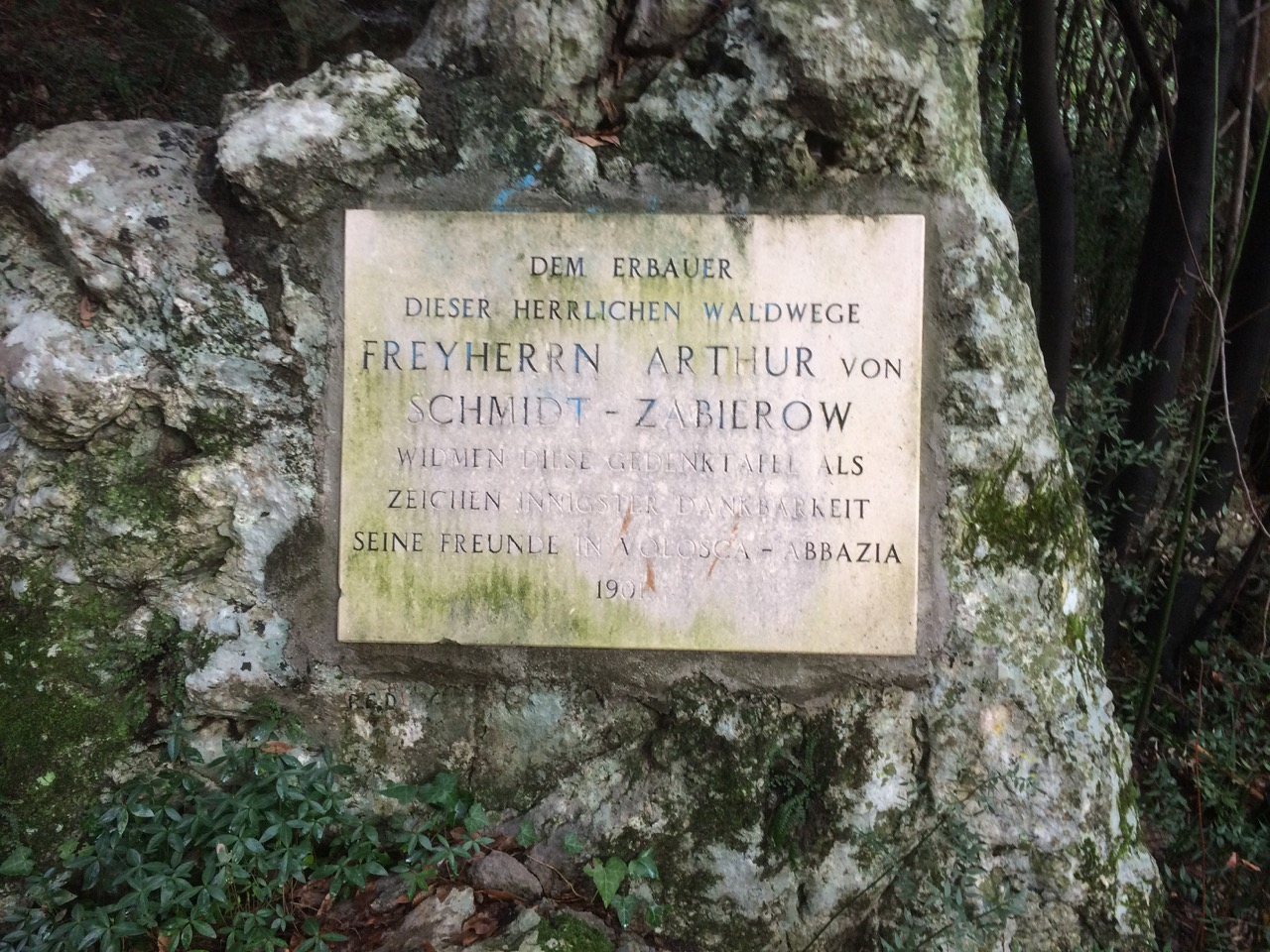
A plaque on the forest path of Carmen Sylva, Opatija

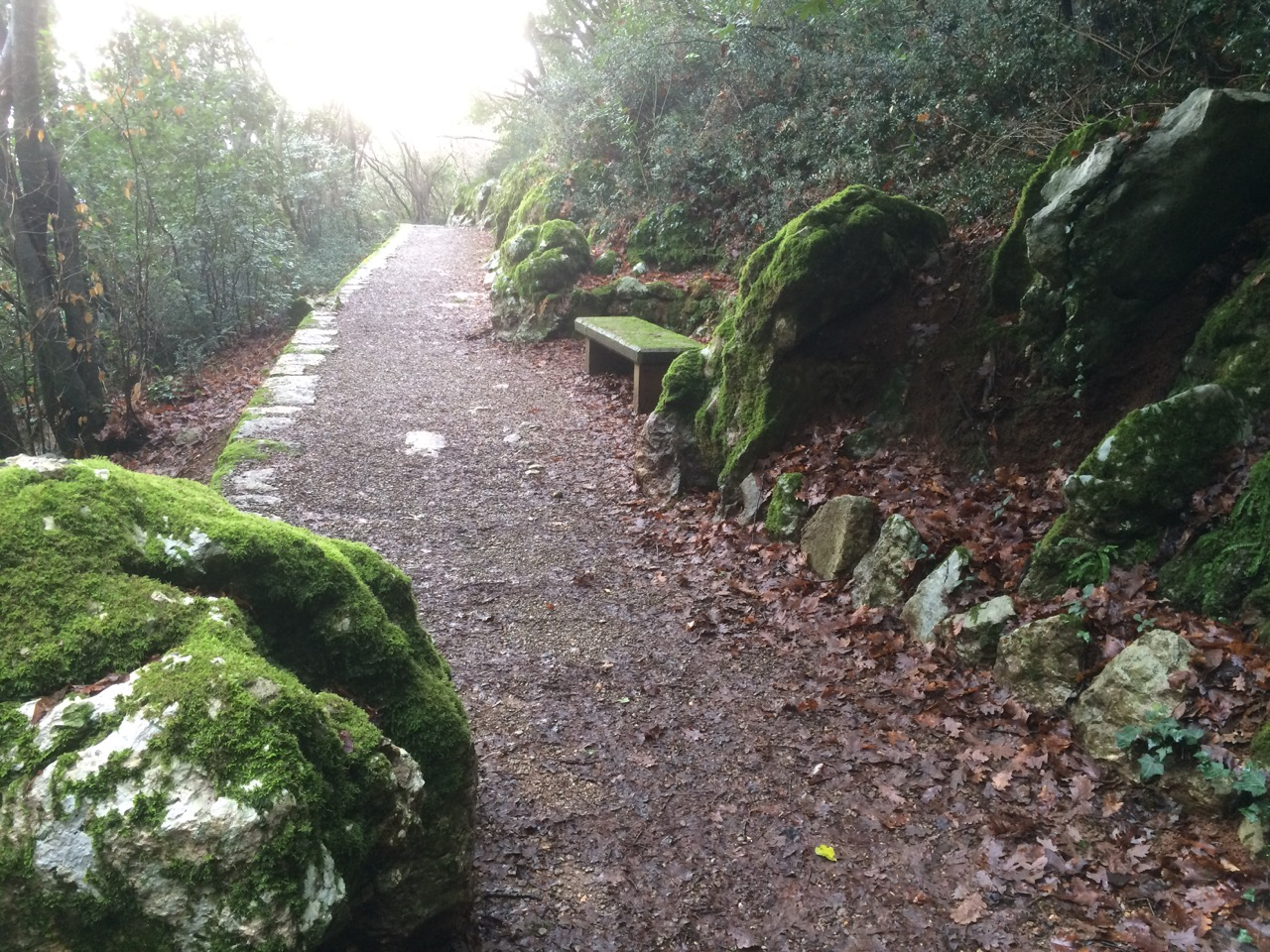
A section of the forest path of Carmen Sylva

The Carmen Sylva forest path (Croatian: Šetalište Carmen Sylve) is a trail in Opatija, Croatia.

The forest path, which starts approx. 45°20'00.3"N 14°17'50.0"E and ends approx. 45°20'58.7"N 14°18'35.5"E, was originally called "King Carol's Forest Trail" (König-Carol-Waldweg). King Carol I of Romania came to Opatija in April 1896 and stayed in the Villa Angiolina together with his wife Elisabeth (née Elisabeth of Wied), also known by her literary name of Carmen Sylva. King Carol I is said to have discovered the trail during a horse ride in the woods beneath Veprinac. A plaque today commemorates Baron Arthur Schmidt-Zabierow, the former district principal of Volosko, who constructed the path with funds donated by King Carol.
