= Elisabeth of Wied =

Princess/Queen of Romania from 1869 to 1914

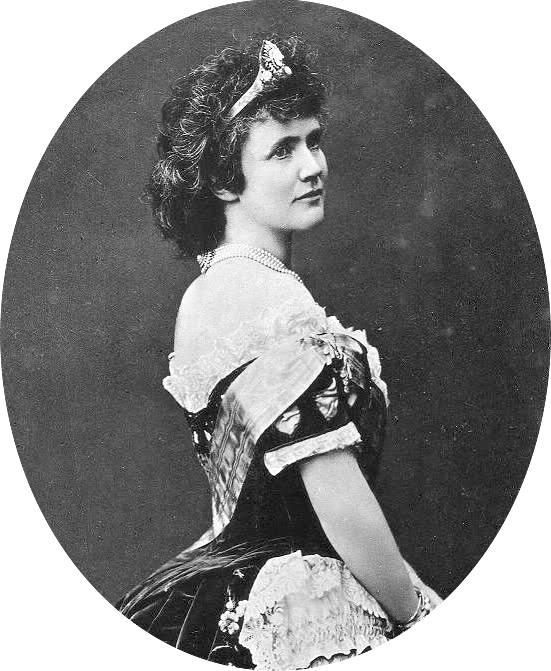
- Elisabeth c. 1870

Queen consort of Romania
- Tenure: 15 March 1881 – 27 September 1914
- Coronation: 10 May 1881

Princess consort of Romania
- Tenure: 15 November 1869 – 15 March 1881
- Born: 29 December 1843; Schloss Monrepos, Neuwied, Duchy of Nassau
- Died: 2 March 1916 (aged 72); Golescu Mansion, Bucharest, Kingdom of Romania
- Burial: Curtea de Argeș Cathedral
- Spouse: Carol I of Romania (m. 1869; died 1914)
- Issue: Princess Maria of Romania
Names
- Pauline Elisabeth Ottilie Luise
- House: Wied-Neuwied
- Father: Hermann, Prince of Wied
- Mother: Princess Marie of Nassau
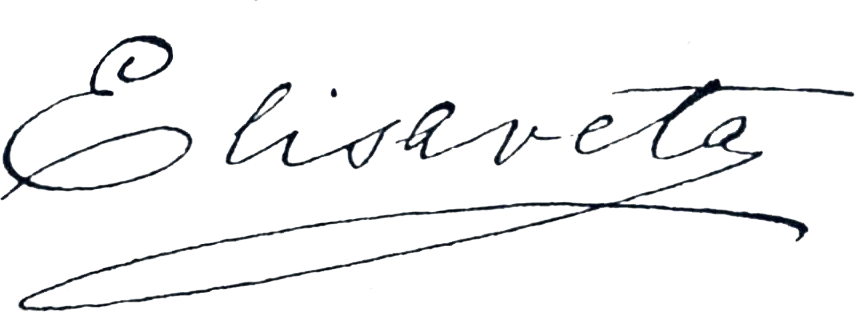
- Signature

Elisabeth of Wied (Pauline Elisabeth Ottilie Luise; 29 December 1843 – 2 March [O.S. 18 February] 1916) was the first Queen of Romania as the wife of King Carol I from 15 March 1881 to 27 September 1914. She had been the princess consort of Romania since her marriage to then-Prince Carol on 15 November 1869.

Elisabeth was born into a German noble family. She was briefly considered as a potential bride for the future British king Edward VII, but Edward rejected her. Elisabeth married Prince Carol of Romania in 1869. Their only child, Princess Maria, died aged three in 1874, and Elisabeth never fully recovered from the loss of her daughter. When Romania became a kingdom in 1881, Elisabeth became queen, and she was crowned together with Carol that same year.

Elisabeth was a prolific writer under the name Carmen Sylva.

== Family and early life ==
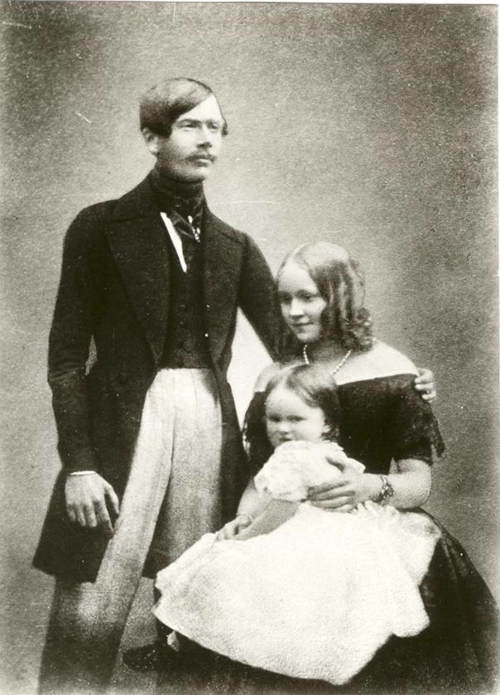
Princess Elisabeth with her parents Hermann, Prince of Wied and Princess Marie of Nassau in 1845.

Princess Elisabeth was born on 29 December 1843 at Castle Monrepos in Neuwied near Koblenz in Germany as the eldest child of Herman, 4th Prince of Wied, and his wife Princess Marie of Nassau. Her father was the prince of the small mediatized German Principality of Wied. Her mother was the daughter of William, Duke of Nassau and a sister of Adolf, Duke of Nassau and Queen Sophia of Sweden and Norway.

Elisabeth had artistic leanings; her childhood featured seances and visits to the local asylum for the mentally ill.

== Marriage ==
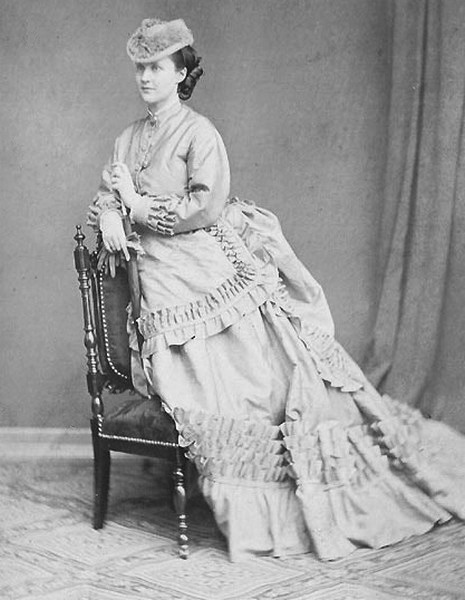
Princess Elisabeth of Wied in her youth, circa 1867-72

When she was about 16, Elisabeth was considered as a possible bride for Albert Edward, Prince of Wales ("Bertie"), the eldest son and heir apparent of Queen Victoria of the United Kingdom. The Queen strongly favored Elisabeth as a prospective daughter-in-law and urged her daughter Victoria, Princess Royal, to look further into her. Elisabeth was spending the social season at the Berlin court, where her family hoped she would be tamed into a docile, marriageable princess. Princess Victoria told the Queen, "I do not think her at all distinguée looking—certainly the opposite to Bertie's usual taste", whereas the tall and slender Alexandra of Denmark was "just the style Bertie admires". The Prince of Wales was also shown photographs of Elisabeth, but professed himself unmoved and declined to give them a second glance. In the end, Alexandra was selected for Albert Edward.

Elisabeth first met Prince Karl of Hohenzollern-Sigmaringen in Berlin in 1861. In 1869, Karl, who was now Prince Carol of Romania, traveled to Germany in search of a suitable consort. He was reunited with Elisabeth, and the two were married on 15 November 1869 in Neuwied. Their only child, a daughter, Maria, died in 1874 at age three – an event from which Elisabeth never recovered. She was crowned Queen of Romania in 1881 after Romania was proclaimed a kingdom.

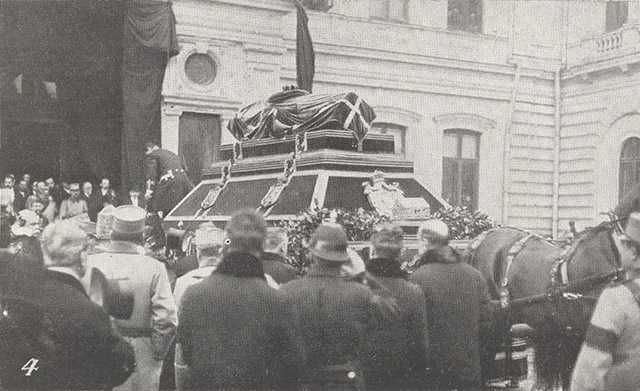
Funeral procession in 1916, with Princess Marie's coffin atop her mother's casquet.

In the Russo-Turkish War of 1877–1878, also known as the Romanian War of Independence, she devoted herself to the care of the wounded, and founded the Decoration of the Cross of Queen Elisabeth to reward distinguished service in such work. She founded the National Society for the Blind and was the first royal patron of the Romanian Red Cross.She fostered the higher education of women in Romania, and established societies for various charitable objects. She was the 835th Dame of the Order of Queen Maria Luisa. She died at the Golescu Mansion in Bucharest.

Early distinguished by her excellence as a pianist, organist and singer, she also showed considerable ability in painting and illuminating; but a lively poetic imagination led her to the path of literature, and more especially to poetry, folk-lore and ballads. In addition to numerous original works she put into literary form many of the legends current among the Romanian peasantry.

== Literary activity ==
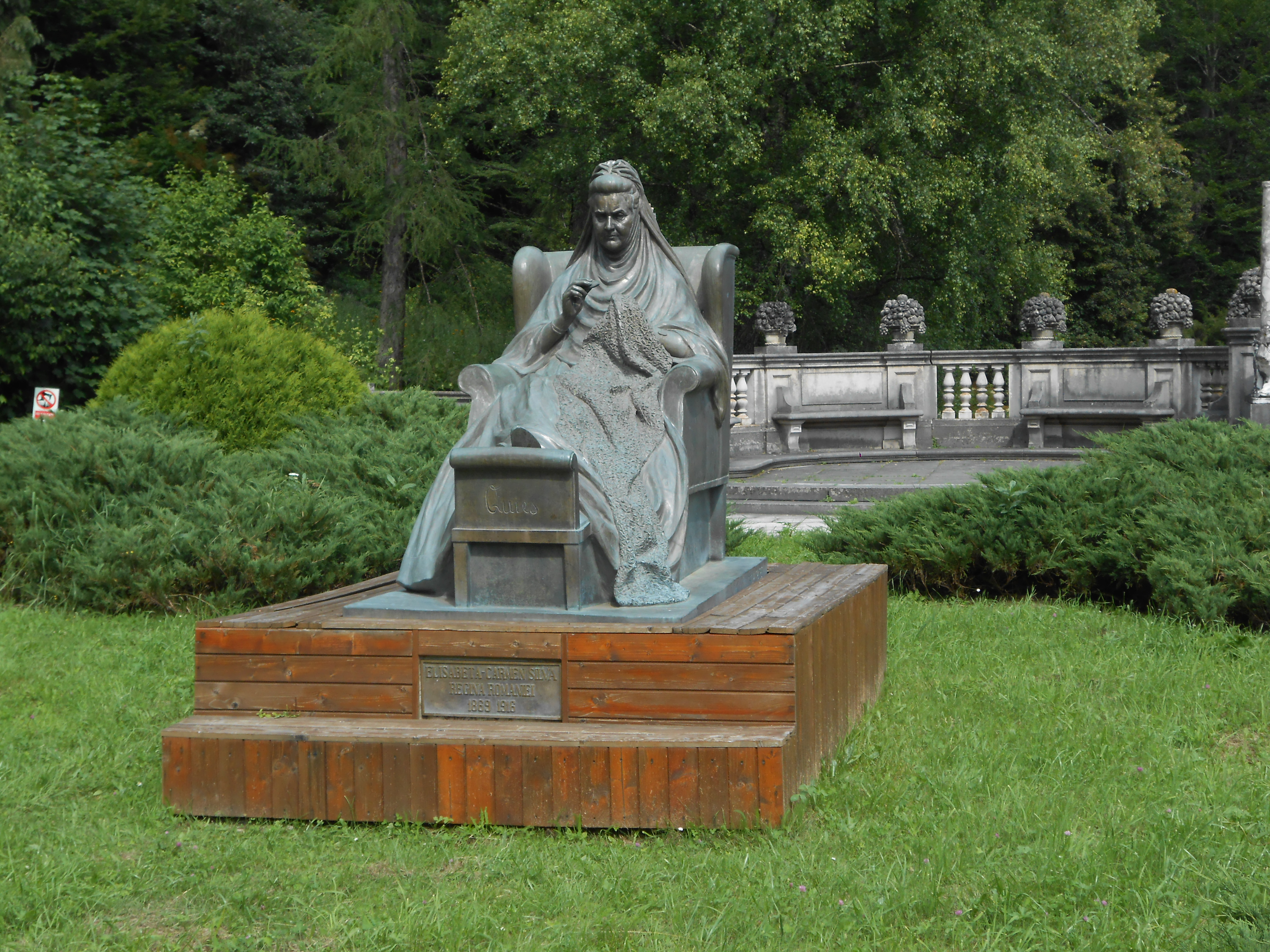
Monument to Elisabeth of Wied at Peleș Castle, Sinaia (by Oscar Späthe)

As "Carmen Sylva", she wrote with facility in German, Romanian, French and English. A few of her voluminous writings, which include poems, plays, novels, short stories, essays, collections of aphorisms, etc., may be singled out for special mention:

- Her earliest publications were Sappho and Hammerstein, two poems which appeared at Leipzig in 1880.
- In 1888 she received the Prix Botta, a prize awarded triennially by the Académie Française, for her volume of prose aphorisms Les Pensees d'une reine (Paris, 1882), a German version of which is entitled Vom Amboss (Bonn, 1890).
- Cuvinte Sufletesci, religious meditations in Romanian (Bucharest, 1888), was also translated into German (Bonn, 1890), as Seelen-Gespräche.

Several of the queen's works as "Carmen Sylva" were written in collaboration with Mite Kremnitz, one of her maids of honor; these were published between 1881 and 1888, sometimes under the joint pseudonym Dito et Idem. These include:

- Aus zwei Welten (Leipzig, 1884), a novel
- Anna Boleyn (Bonn, 1886), a tragedy
- In der Irre (Bonn, 1888), a collection of short stories
- Edleen Vaughan, or Paths of Peril (London, 1894), a novel
- Sweet Hours (London, 1904), a collection of English poems

Among several translations by "Carmen Sylva" include:

- German versions of Pierre Loti's romance Pecheur d'Islande
- German versions of Paul de St Victor's dramatic criticisms Les Deux Masques (Paris, 1881–1884)
- The Bard of the Dimbovitza, an English translation of Elena Văcărescu's collection of Romanian folk-songs, etc., entitled Lieder aus dem Dimbovitzathal (Bonn, 1889), translated in collaboration with British poet Alma Strettell. The Bard of the Dimbovitza was first published in 1891, and was soon reissued and expanded.

Translations of original works by "Carmen Sylva" have appeared in all principal languages of Europe and in Armenian.

A book of reminiscences, From Memory's Shrine, was published in 1911.

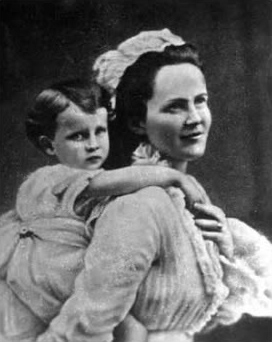
Queen Elisabeth of Romania with her daughter Maria

== Văcărescu Affair ==
In 1881, due to the lack of heirs to the Romanian throne, King Carol I adopted his nephew, Ferdinand. Ferdinand, a complete stranger in his new home, started to get close to one of Elisabeth's ladies in waiting, Elena Văcărescu. Elisabeth, very close to Elena herself, encouraged the romance, although she was perfectly aware of the fact that a marriage between the two was forbidden by the Romanian constitution.

The result of this was the exile of both Elisabeth (in Neuwied) and Elena (in Paris), as well as a trip by Ferdinand through Europe in search of a suitable bride, whom he eventually found in Queen Victoria's granddaughter, Princess Marie of Edinburgh. The affair helped reinforce Elisabeth's image as a dreamer and eccentric.

Quite unusually for a queen, Elisabeth of Wied was personally of the opinion that a republican form of government was preferable to monarchy—an opinion which she expressed forthrightly in her diary, though she did not make it public at the time:

"I must sympathize with the Social Democrats, especially in view of the inaction and corruption of the nobles. These "little people", after all, want only what nature confers: equality. The Republican form of government is the only rational one. I can never understand the foolish people, the fact that they continue to tolerate us."

== Honours ==
=== National ===
- Germany: Dame of the Order of Louise
  - Hohenzollern: Dame of the House Order of Hohenzollern
- Romania: Knight Grand Cross of the Order of the Crown
- Romania: Knight Grand Cross with Collar of the Order of Carol I
- Romania: Knight Grand Cross of the Order of the Star of Romania
- Romania: Grand Master Knight of the Decoration of the Cross of Queen Elisabeth
- Romania: Recipient of the Ruby Jubilee Medal of King Carol I

=== Foreign ===
- Austria-Hungary:
  - Dame of the Order of the Starry Cross, 1st Class
  - Decoration of Honour for Arts and Sciences, in Brilliants, 1896
  - Grand Cross of the Imperial Austrian Order of Elizabeth, 1913
- Portugal: Dame of the Order of Queen Saint Isabel
- Russia: Grand Cross of the Imperial Order of Saint Catherine
- Serbia: Grand Cross of the Royal Order of Saint Sava
- Spain: Dame of the Order of Queen Maria Luisa, 26 December 1884
- United Kingdom: Royal Order of Victoria and Albert, 1st Class
- Württemberg: Dame of the Order of Olga, 1880

== Legacy ==
The Bucharest-born colonizer of Patagonia and Tierra del Fuego, Julius Popper, was a fan of her work and named some features after her.

- Sierra Carmen Silva (Chile)
- Río Carmen Silva (Argentina, also known as Río Chico)
- The Forest path of Carmen Sylva (Šetalište Carmen Sylve) in Opatija, Croatia
- Villa Carmen Sylva (Domburg)
- Villa Carmen Sylva (Varese)

== Ancestry ==
Ancestors of Elisabeth of Wied

8. Friedrich Karl, Prince of Wied
4. Johann August Karl, Prince of Wied
9. Countess Marie of Sayn-Wittgenstein-Berleburg
2. Hermann, Prince of Wied
10. Wilhelm, Prince of Solms-Braunfels
5. Princess Sophie Auguste of Solms-Braunfels
11. Wild- and Rhinegravine Auguste Franziska of Salm-Grumbach
1. Princess Elisabeth of Wied
12. Frederick William, Prince of Nassau-Weilburg
6. William, Duke of Nassau
13. Burgravine Louise Isabelle of Kirchberg
3. Princess Marie of Nassau
14. Frederick, Duke of Saxe-Altenburg
7. Princess Louise of Saxe-Hildburghausen
15. Duchess Charlotte Georgine of Mecklenburg-Strelitz

== Bibliography ==
- Badea-Păun, Gabriel (2003). Carmen Sylva : Uimitoarea Regină Elisabeta a României, 1843–1916 [Carmen Sylva : The Amazing Queen Elisabeth of Romania, 1843–1916] (in Romanian). Translated by Irina-Margareta Nistor (1st edition, second edition in 2007, third edition in 2008 ed.). Bucharest: Editura Humanitas. ISBN 978-973-50-1101-7.
- Gabriel Badea-Päun, Jean-Jules-Antoine Lecomte du Nouÿ (1842–1923) à la cour royale de Roumanie, dans Bulletin de la Société de l'Historie de l'Art Français, Année 2005, Paris, 2006, pp. 257–81.
- Badea-Păun, Gabriel (2011). Carmen Sylva : la reine Elisabeth de Roumanie [Carmen Sylva : Queen Elisabeth of Romania] (in French). Versailles: Via Romana. ISBN 978-2916727950.
- Badea-Păun, Gabriel (2011). Carmen Sylva : Königin Elisabeth von Rumänien – eine rheinische Prinzessin auf Rumäniens Thron [Carmen Sylva : Queen Elisabeth of Romania – a Rhineland princess on Romania's throne] (in German). Translated by Silvia Irina Zimmermann. With a preface by HSH Carl, Prince of Wied. Stuttgart: ibidem-Verlag. ISBN 978-3-8382-0245-7.
- Bengesco, Georges (1904). Carmen Sylva. (Sa Majesté la Reine Elisabeth du Roumanie). Bibliographie et extraits de ses oeuvres (in French). Paris: Le Soudier i.a.
- Bengesco, Georges (1905). Carmen Sylva intime : la famille, l'enfance, l'éducation, les fiançailles, le mariage, la maternité, l'œuvre littéraire et l'œuvre philanthropique (in French). Paris: Felix Juven.
- Crǎciun, Boris (1997). Regii și Reginele României : O istorie ilustrata a Casei Regale [The Kings and Queens of Romania: An Illustrated History of the Royal House] (in Romanian). Iași: Editura Porțile Orientului. ISBN 973-97442-2-2.
- Diederich, Benno (1898). Königin Elisabeth von Rumänien (Carmen Sylva). Ein Lebensbild [Queen Elisabeth of Romania (Carmen Sylva). A biography] (in German). Leipzig: R. Voigtländer.
- Ghermani, Dionisie (1974). "Carmen Sylva". Biographisches Lexikon zur Geschichte Südosteuropas (in German). Vol. 1. Munich: Oldenourg Verlag. pp. 457–458. ISBN 3-486-47871-0.
- Elisabeth Heimpel (1957). "Carmen Sylva". Neue Deutsche Biographie (in German). Vol. 3. Berlin: Duncker & Humblot. pp. 149–149. (full text online).
- Hitchins, Keith (1994). Rumania 1866–1947. Oxford University Press.
- Hibbert, Christopher (2007). Edward VII: The Last Victorian King. New York: Palgrave Macmillan.
- Muzeul Naţional de Istorie a României (2009). Familia regala. O istorie in imagini [The Royal Family. A History in Images] (in Romanian). Cetatea de Scaun. ISBN 978-973-8966-97-0.
- Pakula, Hannah (1995). An Uncommon Woman: The Empress Frederick, Daughter of Queen Victoria, Wife of the Crown Prince of Prussia, Mother of Kaiser Wilhelm. New York: Simon and Schuster. ISBN 0-684-84216-5.
- von Stackelberg, Natalie (1889). Aus Carmen Sylva's Leben [From Carmen Sylva's life] (in German) (5th ed.). Heidelberg: Universitätsverlag Winter.
- Wolbe, Eugen (1933). Carmen Sylva : Der Lebensweg einer einsamen Königin [Carmen Sylva: The Life of a Lonely Queen] (in German). Leipzig: Koehler und Amelang.
- Zimmermann, Silvia Irina: Die dichtende Königin. Elisabeth, Prinzessin zu Wied, Königin von Rumänien, Carmen Sylva (1843–1916). Selbstmythisierung und prodynastische Öffentlichkeitsarbeit durch Literatur, (Doctoral thesis University of Marburg 2001/2003), ibidem-Verlag, Stuttgart, 2010, 482 pages; ISBN 978-3-8382-0185-6.
- Zimmermann, Silvia Irina: Der Zauber des fernen Königreichs. Carmen Sylvas „Pelesch-Märchen“, (Magisterarbeit Universität Marburg 1996), ibidem-Verlag, Stuttgart, 2011, 180 pages; ISBN 978-3-8382-0195-5.
- Zimmermann, Silvia Irina (2014). Unterschiedliche Wege, dasselbe Ideal: Das Königsbild im Werk Carmen Sylvas und in Fotografien des Fürstlich Wiedischen Archivs [Different paths, the same ideal: The image of the king in the work of Carmen Sylva and in photographs from the Princely Archive of Wied]. Schriftenreihe der Forschungsstelle Carmen Sylva – Fürstlich Wiedisches Archiv (in German). Vol. 1. Stuttgart: ibidem-Verlag. ISBN 978-3-8382-0655-4.
- Zimmermann, Silvia Irina: The Child of the Sun: Royal Fairy Tales and Essays by the Queens of Romania, Elisabeth (Carmen Sylva, 1843-1916) and Marie (1875-1938). Selected and edited, with an introduction and bibliography by Silvia Irina Zimmermann. Stuttgart: ibidem-Verlag (Ibidem Press), 2020, 315 pages, 54 illustrations (7 colored), ISBN 978-3-8382-1393-4.

Elisabeth of Wied House of Wied Cadet branch of the House of Wied Born: 29 December 1843 Died: 2 March 1916
Romanian royalty
Preceded by Elena Rosetti	Princess consort of Romania; 1869–1881	Title abandoned
New title	Queen consort of Romania; 1881–1914	Succeeded by Marie of Edinburgh
