= Gabriel Badea-Päun =

French art historian (born 1973)

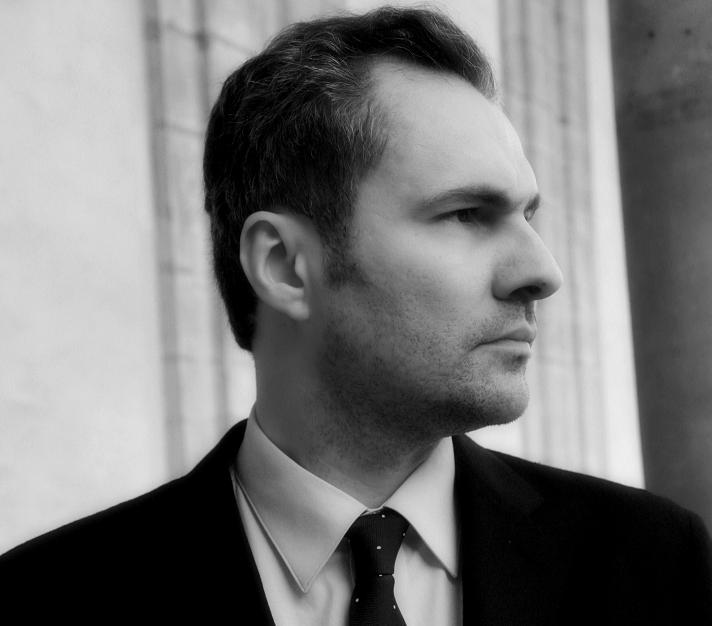
- Badea-Päun in 2011
- Born: 20 January 1973 (age 53); Sinaia, Romania
- Occupations: Art historian, historian

Gabriel Badea-Päun (born 20 January 1973), is a French art historian of Romanian descent.

Having trained at the University of Bucharest, in the History Department, he pursued his studies at the Sorbonne (Paris IV) where he wrote his PhD thesis on Antonio de La Gandara (1861–1917), un portraitiste de la Belle Époque. Gabriel Badea-Päun contributed to various art historical publications such as : Bulletin de la Société de l'Histoire de l'Art Français, Revue de la Bibliothèque Nationale de France, Nouvelles de l'Estampe, and Revue roumaine de l'histoire de l'art.

== Bibliography ==
Books

- Les Peintres roumains et la France (1834-1939), Paris, In Fine Éditions d'art, 2019, (foreword by Adrian-Silvan Ionescu) (ISBN 978-290-230-2130).
  - Pictori români în Franța (1834-1939), (Romanian painters in France, 1834-1939), Bucharest, Noi Media Print, 2012. (ISBN 978-606-572-014-5).
- Le style Second Empire. Architecture, décors et art de vivre, Paris, Citadelles et Mazenod, 2009. (ISBN 978-2-85088-297-5) (Foreword by Daniel Alcouffe), Prix Second Empire de la Fondation Napoléon 2010.
- Mecena si comanditari. Arta si mesaj politic, (Mecenas and commissioners. Art and political message), Bucharest, Noi Media Print, 2009. ISBN 978-973-180-545-0 (in Roumanian), Prize Alexandru Tzigara-Samurcaş of the Magazin Istoric Foundation, 2010.
- Portraits de Société XIXe – XXe siècle, Paris, Citadelles et Mazenod, 2007. Foreword by Richard Ormond (ISBN 978-2-85088-246-3). Prix du cercle Montherlant-Académie des Beaux-Arts 2008.
  - The Society Portrait from David to Warhol, translated into English by Barbara Mellor, New York, Vendôme Press, 2007. (ISBN 978-0-86565-183-8)
  - The Society Portrait; Painting, Prestige And The Pursuit Of Elegance, translated into English by Barbara Mellor, London, Thames & Hudson, 2007. (ISBN 0-500-23842-1)
- Carmen Sylva, la reine Elisabeth de Roumanie, Versailles, Via Romana, 2011, ISBN 978-2-916727-95-0
  - Carmen Sylva, uimitoarea Regina Elisabeta a României, translated from the French by Irina Margareta Nistor, Bucharest, Humanitas, 2003. New revised and enlarged edition in 2007. (ISBN 978-973-50-1101-7); third edition 2008; fourth edition in 2010.
  - Carmen Sylva. Königin Elisabeth von Rumänien - eine rheinische Prinzessin auf Rumäniens Thron, German translation by Silvia Irina Zimmermann, Stuttgart, Ibidem Verlag, 2011, ISBN 978-3-8382-0245-7
- Monarhi europeni. Marile modele. 1848-1914, (The European Monarchs. The Great Models), Bucharest, Silex, 1997. (with Ion Bulei) (ISBN 973-97927-8-2)

Forewords and editions

- Eugen Wolbe, Regele Ferdinand al României, (King Ferdinand of Roumania), foreword by Gabriel Badea-Päun, Humanitas, 2004, pp. 7–14. ISBN 973-50-0755-X
- Carmen Sylva, Versuri alese, (Selected verses), edition, foreword and chronology by Gabriel Badea-Päun, Bucharest, Eminescu, 1998.ISBN 973-22-0655-1

== Awards and distinctions ==
- Prix Second Empire de la Fondation Napoléon, 2010
- Knight of the Royal Decoration of the Cross of the Royal House of Romania
- Medalia Regele Mihai I pentru Loialitate, (The Medal for Loyalty King Michael of Roumania), 2010
- Prize Alexandru Tzigara-Samurcaş of the Magazin Istoric Foundation, 2010
- Prix du Cercle Montherlant-Académie des Beaux-Arts (2008)
- Chevalier de l'Ordre du Mérite Culturel roumain (2009) Knight of the Roumanian Cultural Order of Merit
