= Opatija =

Opatija Abbazia
- Town
- Grad Opatija
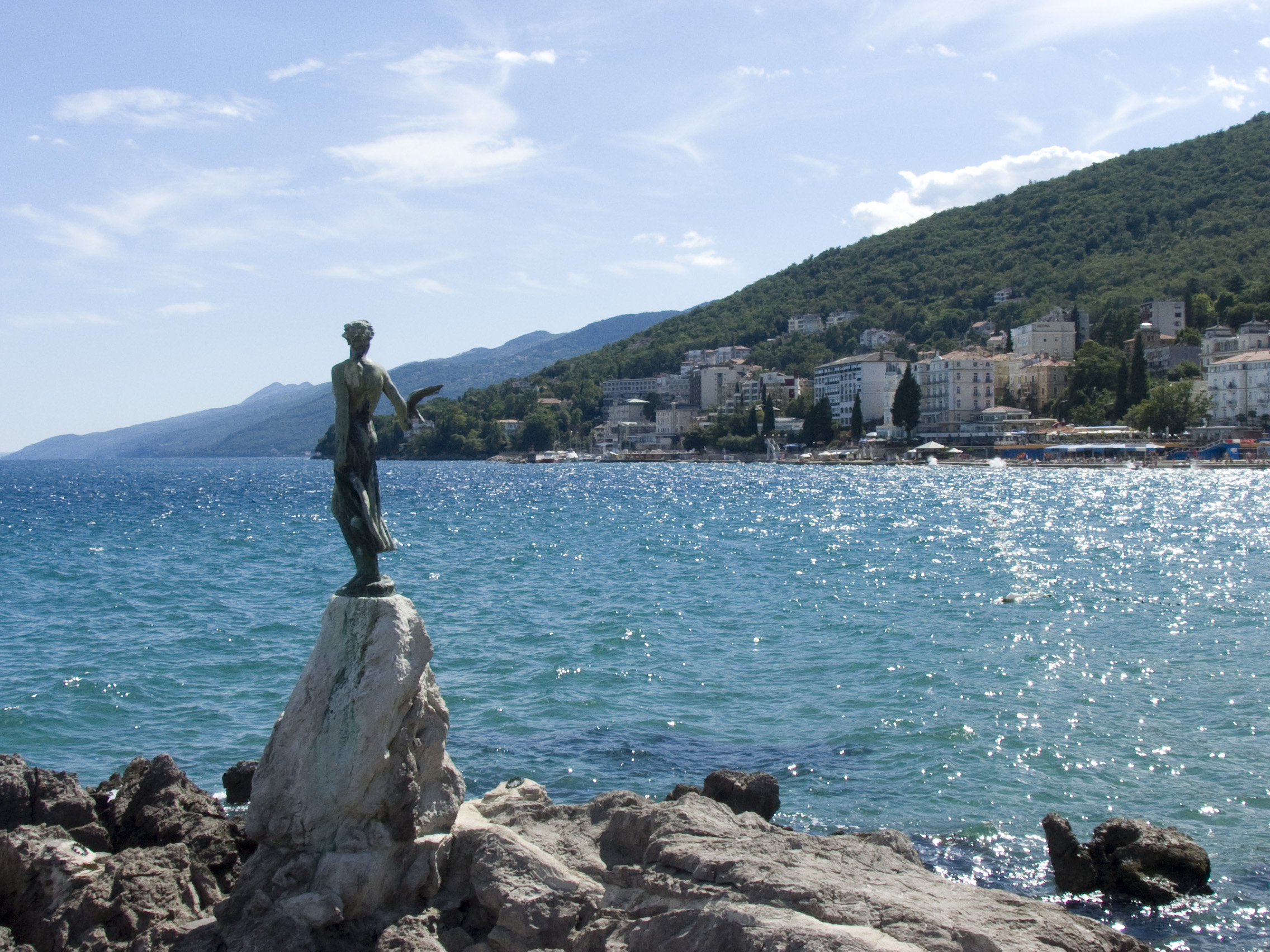
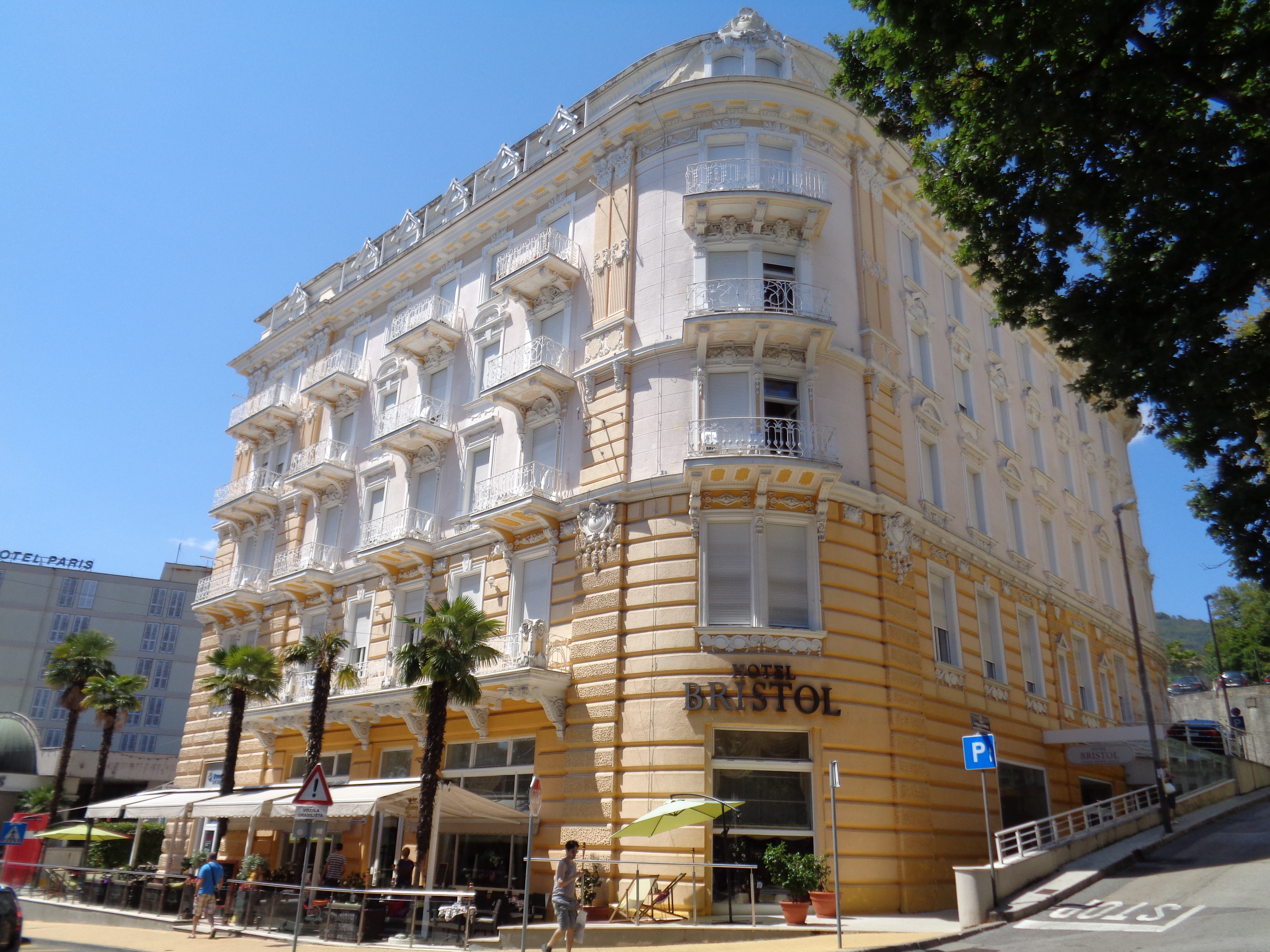
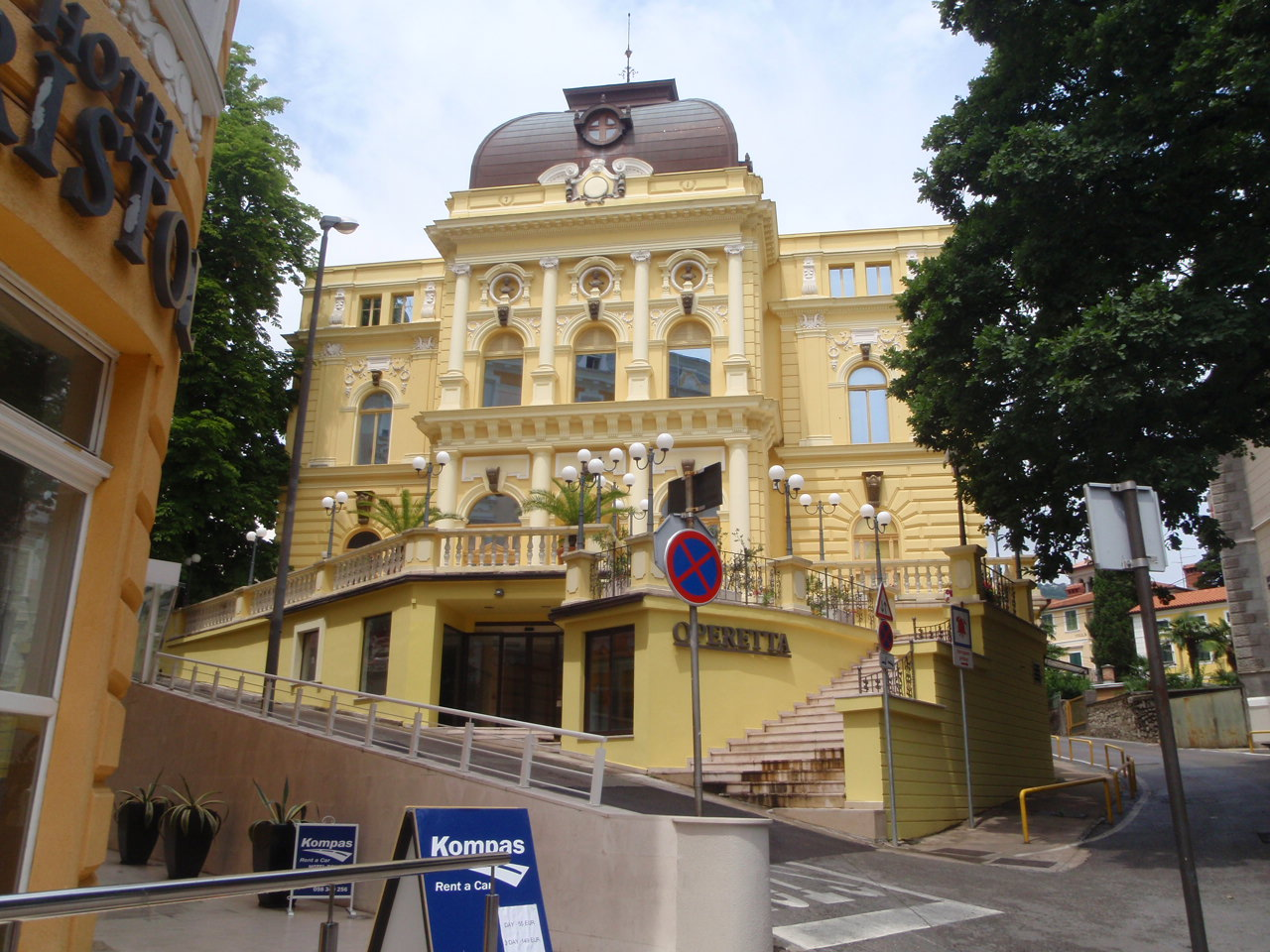
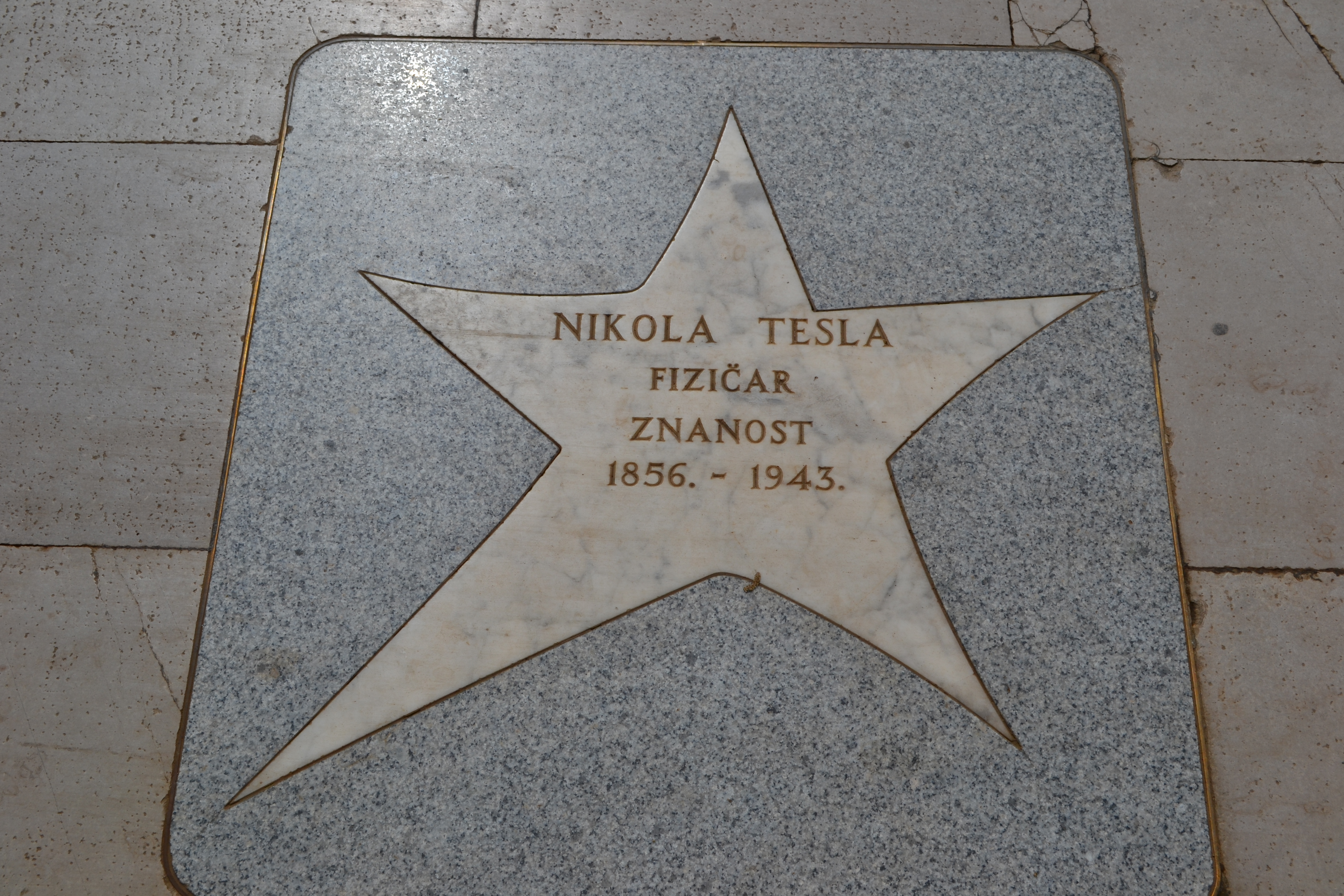
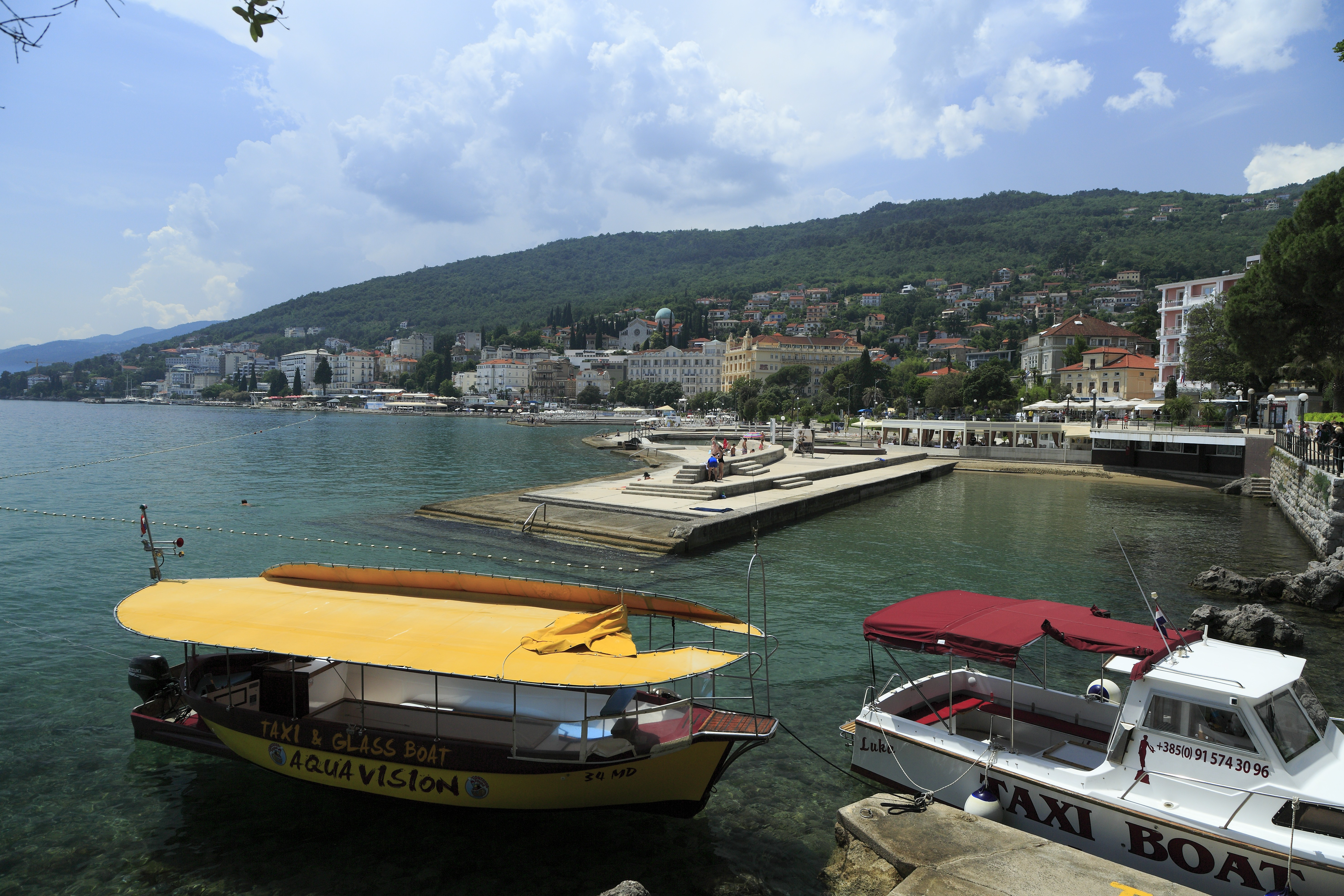
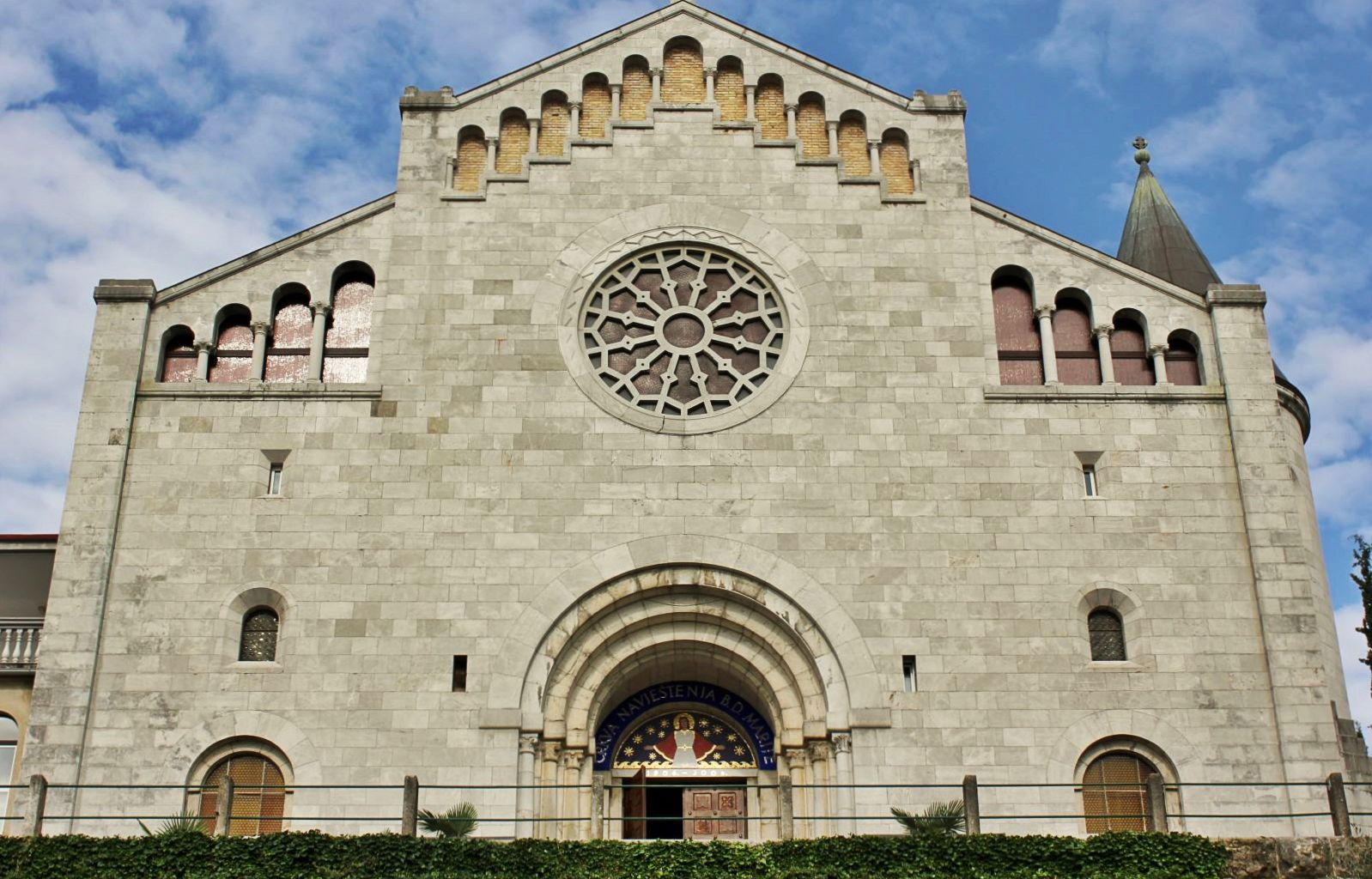
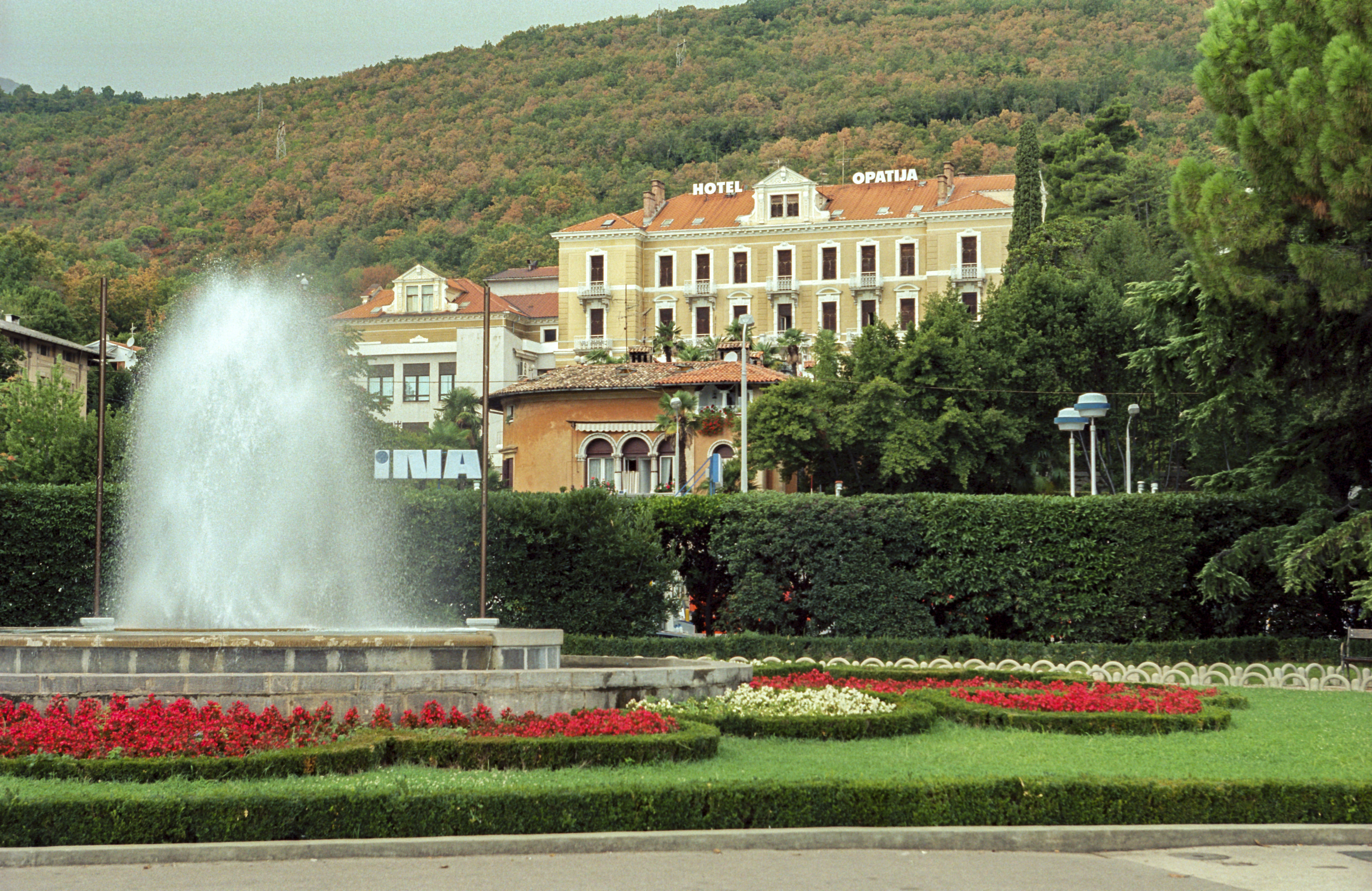
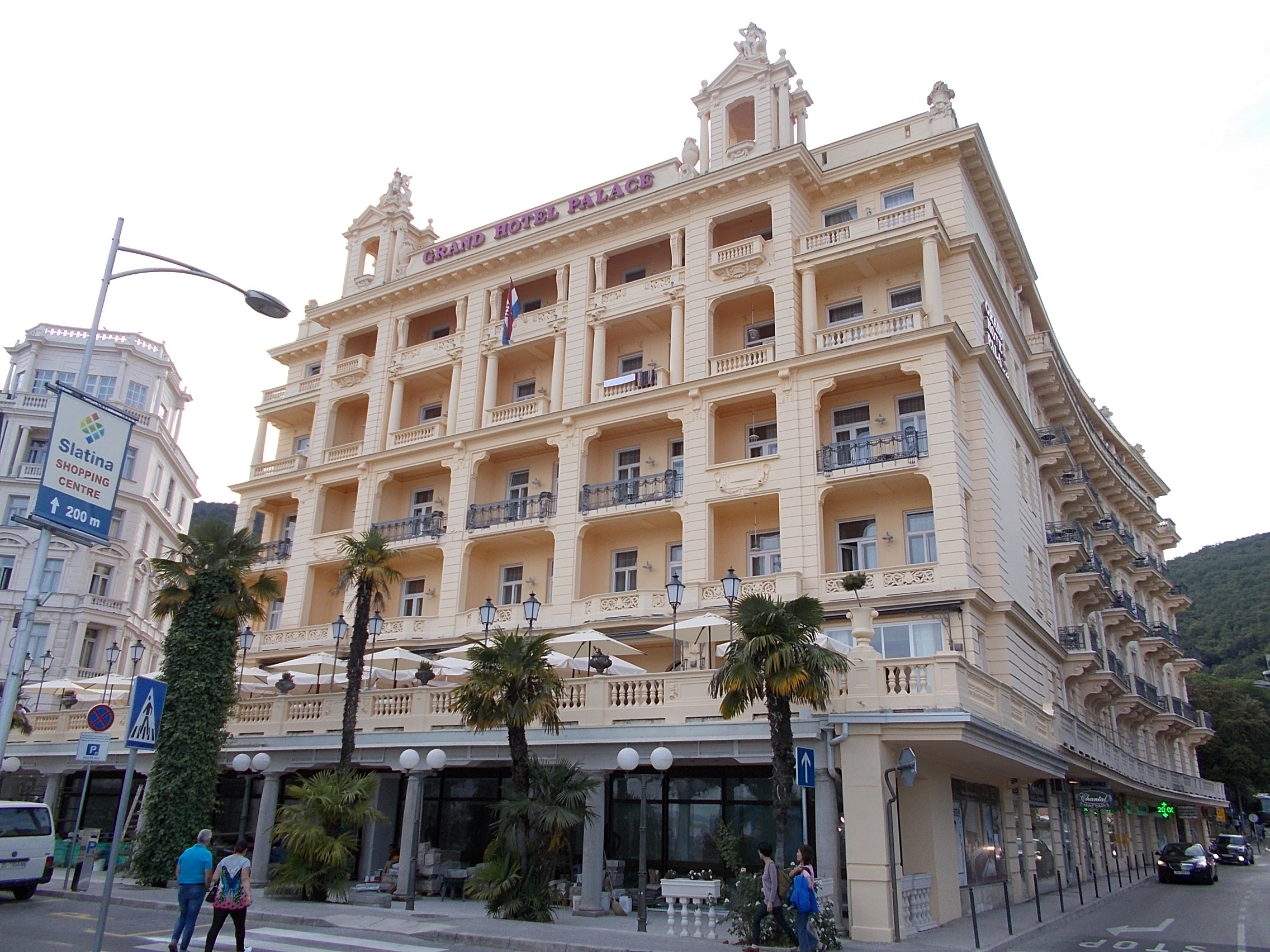
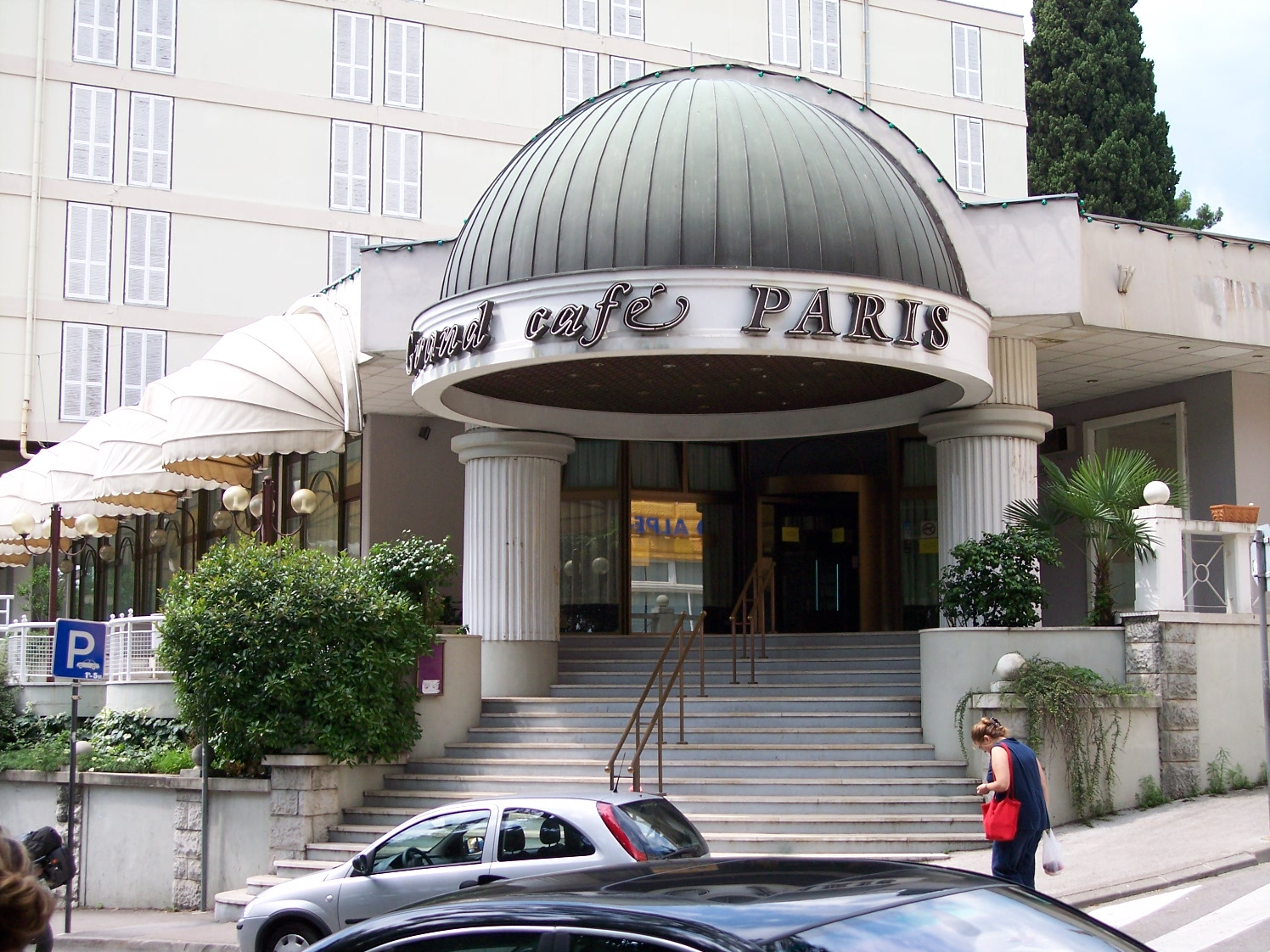
- From top; Opatija riviera with statue of "Girl with a Seagull", Hotel Bristol, Opera House, Nikola Tesla star on Opatija's walk of fame, view of harbour, Church of the Annunciation of the Blessed Virgin Mary, "Grand Hotel Palace" and Grand Hotel & cafe "Paris".

- Flag
- Interactive map of Opatija
- Location of Opatija within Croatia
- Coordinates: 45°20′N 14°18′E
- Country: Croatia
- Region: Kvarner
- County: Primorje-Gorski Kotar County

Government
  - Mayor: Fernando Kirigin (SDP)
  - City Council: 15 members: SDP (5); Independent list of Ivo Dujmić (5); AM-UK (3); HDZ (1); Independent list of Ante Štampalija (1)

Area
  - Town: 67.2 km^{2} (25.9 sq mi)
  - Urban: 3.5 km^{2} (1.4 sq mi)
- Elevation: 0 m (0 ft)

Population (2021)
  - Town: 10,619
  - Density: 158/km^{2} (409/sq mi)
  - Urban: 5,701
  - Urban density: 1,600/km^{2} (4,200/sq mi)
- Time zone: UTC+1 (CET)
  - Summer (DST): UTC+2 (CEST)
- Postal code: 51 410
- Area code: 051
- Website: opatija.hr

Opatija (Croatian: [opǎtija]; Italian: Abbazia; German: Sankt Jakobi) is a town and a municipality in Primorje-Gorski Kotar County in west Croatia. The traditional seaside resort on the Kvarner Gulf is known for its Mediterranean climate and its historic buildings reminiscent of the Austrian Riviera.

== Geography ==
Opatija is located 18 km (11 mi) northwest of the regional capital Rijeka, about 90 km (56 mi) from Trieste by rail and 82 km (51 mi) from Pula by road. The city is geographically on the Istrian peninsula, though not in Istria County. The tourist resort is situated on the Kvarner Gulf, part of the Adriatic coast, in a sheltered position at the foot of Učka massif, with the Vojak peak reaching at a height of 1,401 m (4,596 ft). as of 2021 census, the municipality had 10,661 inhabitants in total, of which 5,715 lived in the urban settlement.

The town is a popular summer and winter resort, with average high temperatures of 10 °C in winter, and 32 °C in summer. Opatija is surrounded by woods of bay laurel. The whole sea-coast to the north and south of Opatija is rocky.

== History ==
Opatija was included in the territory of the Liburni, a pre-Roman Illyrian tribe. In Roman times, the area was home to several patrician villas connected to the nearby town of Castrum Laureana, the modern Lovran.

Croats settled in the region from about 700 AD onwards. Conquered by King Pepin of Italy, son of Charlemagne, in 789, the Istrian peninsula up to the Kvarner Gulf was incorporated into the Carolingian March of Friuli by 803. In the east, it bordered on the medieval Kingdom of Croatia established by King Tomislav about 925. Having invaded Italy, King Otto of Germany made the Istrian lands part of the vast March of Verona and Aquileia; from the 11th century onwards, the Imperial estates were held by the Patriarchs of Aquileia.

In the Middle Ages the current town's territory was divided between Veprinac (now a locality of Opatija, perhaps home to a small fishing port) and Kastav, where the fisherman village of Veprinac. The small hamlet of Opatija itself developed around a Benedictine abbey dedicated to Saint Jacob, which was first mentioned in 1453. While western Istria was gradually conquered by the Republic of Venice by 1420, the remaining territory up to Opatija fell to the House of Habsburg and later was incorporated into the Austrian Littoral.

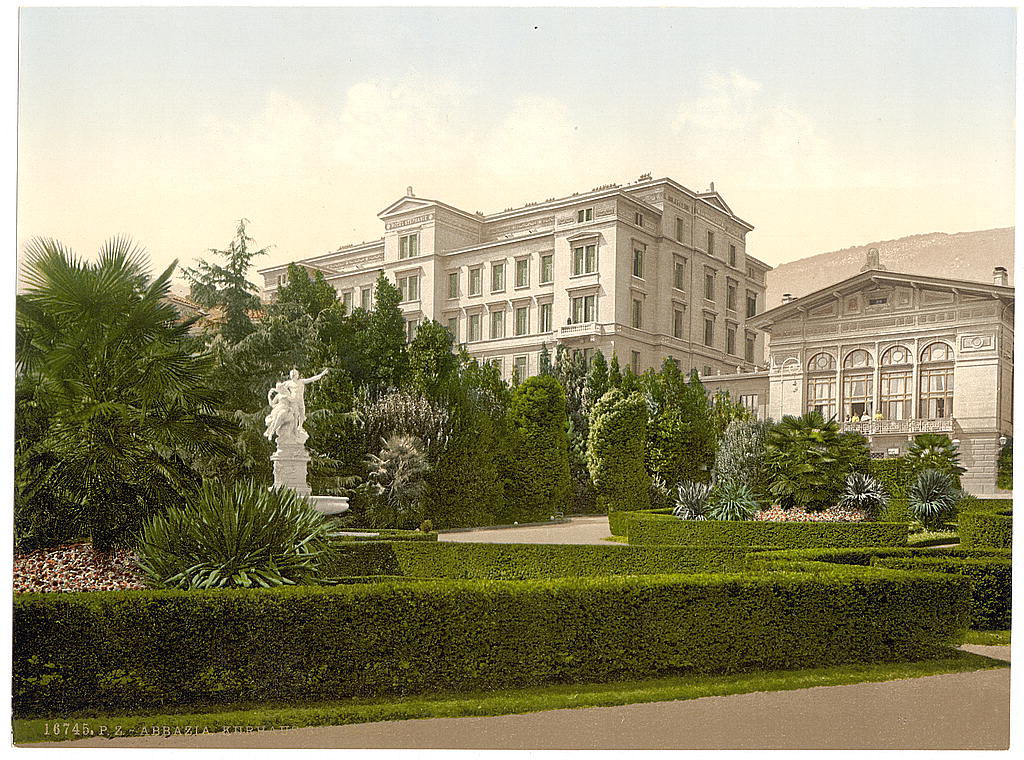
Abbazia, Hotel Stephanie and park, 1890s

The town's modern history began in 1844, when Iginio Scarpa (1794–1866), a wealthy merchant from Rijeka, had the Villa Angiolina manor built in an extended park, where he received notable guests such as Ban Josip Jelačić. In 1873 the Austrian Southern Railway company from Vienna opened the branch line from Pivka to Rijeka via nearby Matulji and thus opened the path for the development of tourism in Opatija and neighbouring Lovran. In 1882, the railway company purchased the Villa Angiolina, where it accommodated the crown princely couple Rudolf and Stéphanie. At the time, Friedrich Julius Schüler (1832–1894), the Managing Director of the Southern Railways, started the construction of the Hotel Quarnero (Kvarner Hotel) and the Hotel Kronprinzessin Stephanie (present-day Hotel Imperial), and also was responsible for the unique lungomare and parks (the Company engaged Carl Schubert, director of the Viennese Emperial-Royal Society for the construction of parks). The Villa Angiolina was later run by the Compagnie Internationale des Wagons-Lits. In the Angiolina Park today stands Schüler's bust, a work of the sculptor Hans Rathausky.

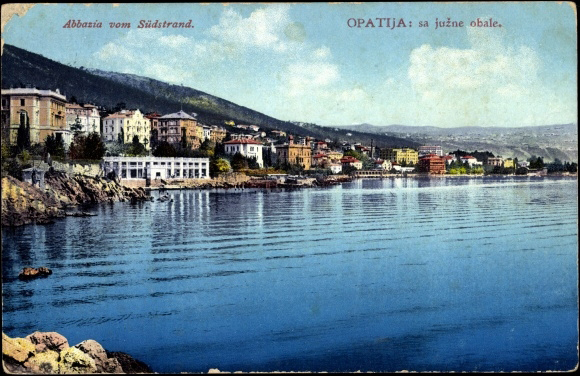
Opatija, 1900s

In 1887, Heinrich von Littrow established the "Union Yacht Club Quarnero" in Opatija (founded in June/July 1886); this was the first sailing club on the Adriatic coast. In 1889 the Cisleithanian government officially declared Abbazia (Opatija) the first climatic seaside resort (Seebad) on the Austrian Riviera, rivalled by Brioni, Duino, Grado, and Portorož. After the hotels, the building of villas started, for the needs of more demanding noble guests. The first Villa Amalia, in the immediate vicinity of the Hotel Quarnero, was built in 1890 as the hotel's annex. Opatija's first guide was published in 1883 in Vienna with the title Abbazia, Idylle von der Adria. The same year saw the publication of Abbazia und seine Umgebung (Opatija and its Environs) by Heinrich Noe, who in 1884 published his Tagebuch aus Abbazia (Diary from Opatija). Joseph Rable printed Curort und Seebad Abbazia (Spa and the bathing beach in Opatija), and Peter von Radics wrote a guidebook simply titled Abbazia.

In 1908 a tramway line was opened, running from Matulji station along the coast via Opatija down to Lovran in the south. Opatija is best known nowadays as the venue for a 1912 chess tournament devoted to the King’s Gambit. The Austrian emperor Franz Joseph I used to spend several months there during the winter. He met there with the German emperor Wilhelm II on 29 March 1894; other crowned heads seeking relaxation included Empress Elisabeth of Austria and the German empress Augusta Victoria, King Carol I of Romania and his consort Elisabeth, King George I of Greece, Albert, King of Saxony, William IV, Grand Duke of Luxembourg, and Prince Nikola I Petrović-Njegoš. Many of the late 19th-century luxury hotels and villas have survived to present times.

During World War I the Hotel Icicii was converted to a military hospital. The accompanying pictures show the nursing staff and wounded at lunch, on the grounds, and receiving care. In 1920 Opatija was assigned to Italy. The upper floor of Villa Amalia was built in 1930, and the building was renovated to become the summer residence of the House of Savoy.

In 1947 Opatija was given to Yugoslavia as part of the peace treaty with Italy; most of the Italian-speaking population emigrated to Italy. In 1963 the Hotel Adriatic, by the architect Andrija Čičin-Šain and his team was completed. Hotel "Adriatic" was the first hotel built in Opatija after the Austro-Hungarian era. The rooms of hotel "Adriatic" have been described as novelties in the hospitality industry. The "Casino Rosalia" was opened in Opatija – the first casino in Eastern Europe. In 1981 the Hotel "Admiral" and marina (200 berths and 40 dry berths) were completed. After the breakup of Yugoslavia which began in 1991, the town became part of Croatia.

== Population ==
Historical population
Year	Pop.	±%
1857	4,491	—
1869	4,159	−7.4%
1880	4,775	+14.8%
1890	5,994	+25.5%
1900	8,430	+40.6%
1910	11,825	+40.3%
1921	9,625	−18.6%
1931	11,865	+23.3%
1948	10,098	−14.9%
1953	9,920	−1.8%
1961	11,154	+12.4%
1971	12,242	+9.8%
1981	13,614	+11.2%
1991	13,566	−0.4%
2001	12,719	−6.2%
2011	11,659	−8.3%
2021	10,619	−8.9%
Source: Naselja i stanovništvo Republike Hrvatske 1857–2021, DZS

Town of Opatija: Population trends 1857–2021
v

population	4491	4159	4775	5994	8430	11825	9625	11865	10098	9920	11154	12242	13614	13566	12719	11659	10619
	1857	1869	1880	1890	1900	1910	1921	1931	1948	1953	1961	1971	1981	1991	2001	2011	2021

Sources: Croatian Bureau of Statistics publications

In the 2021 census, the total municipality population was 11,659, in the following settlements:

- Dobreć, population 375 ▼
- Ičići, population 836 ▼
- Ika, population 295 ▼
- Mala Učka, population 1
- Opatija, population 5701 ▼
- Oprič, population 719 ▼
- Pobri, population 1096 ▼
- Poljane, population 547 ▼
- Vela Učka, population 41 ▼
- Veprinac, population 1008 ▼

== Landmarks ==
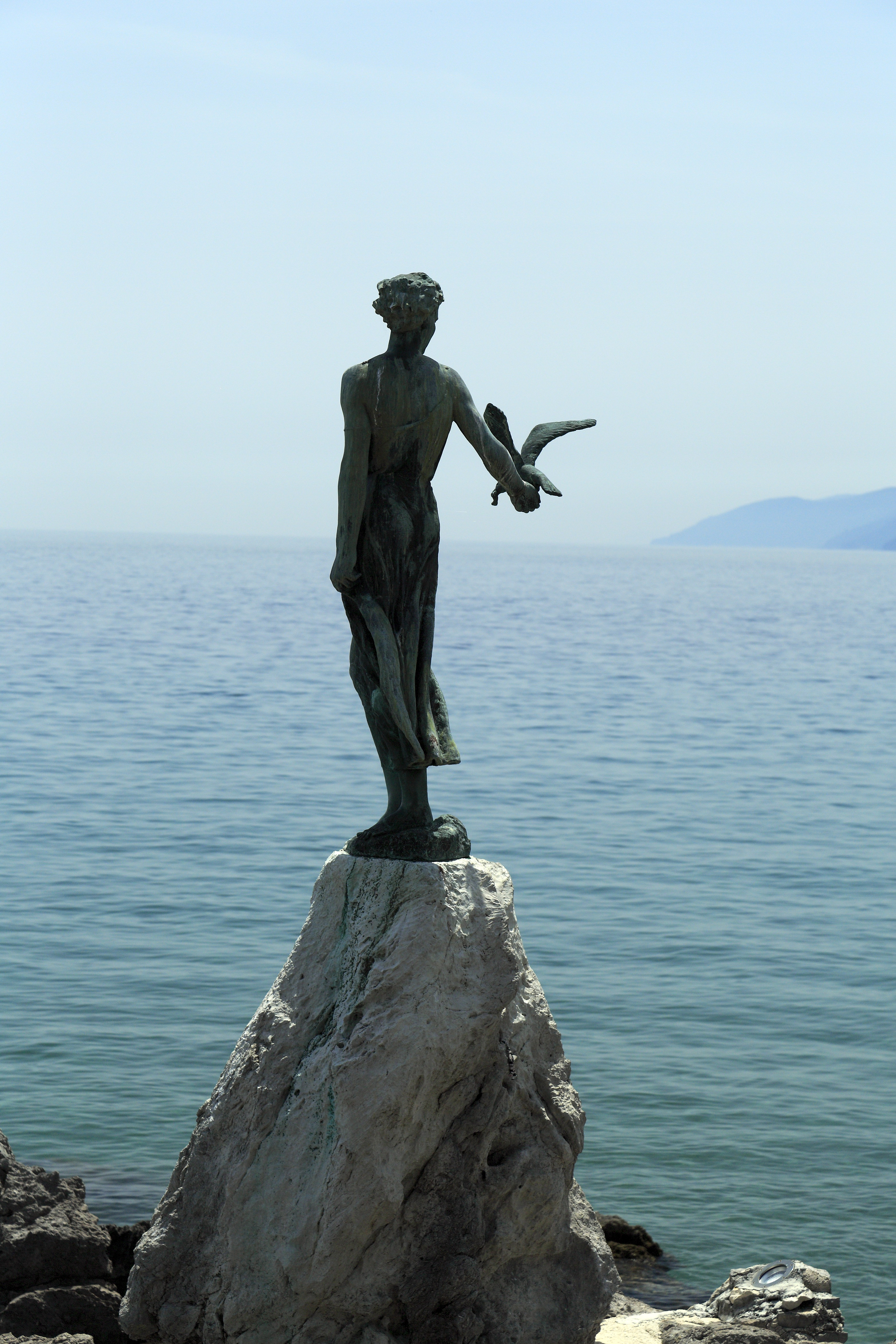
Statue Maiden with a seagull by Zvonko Car, one of the most photographed locations in Croatia

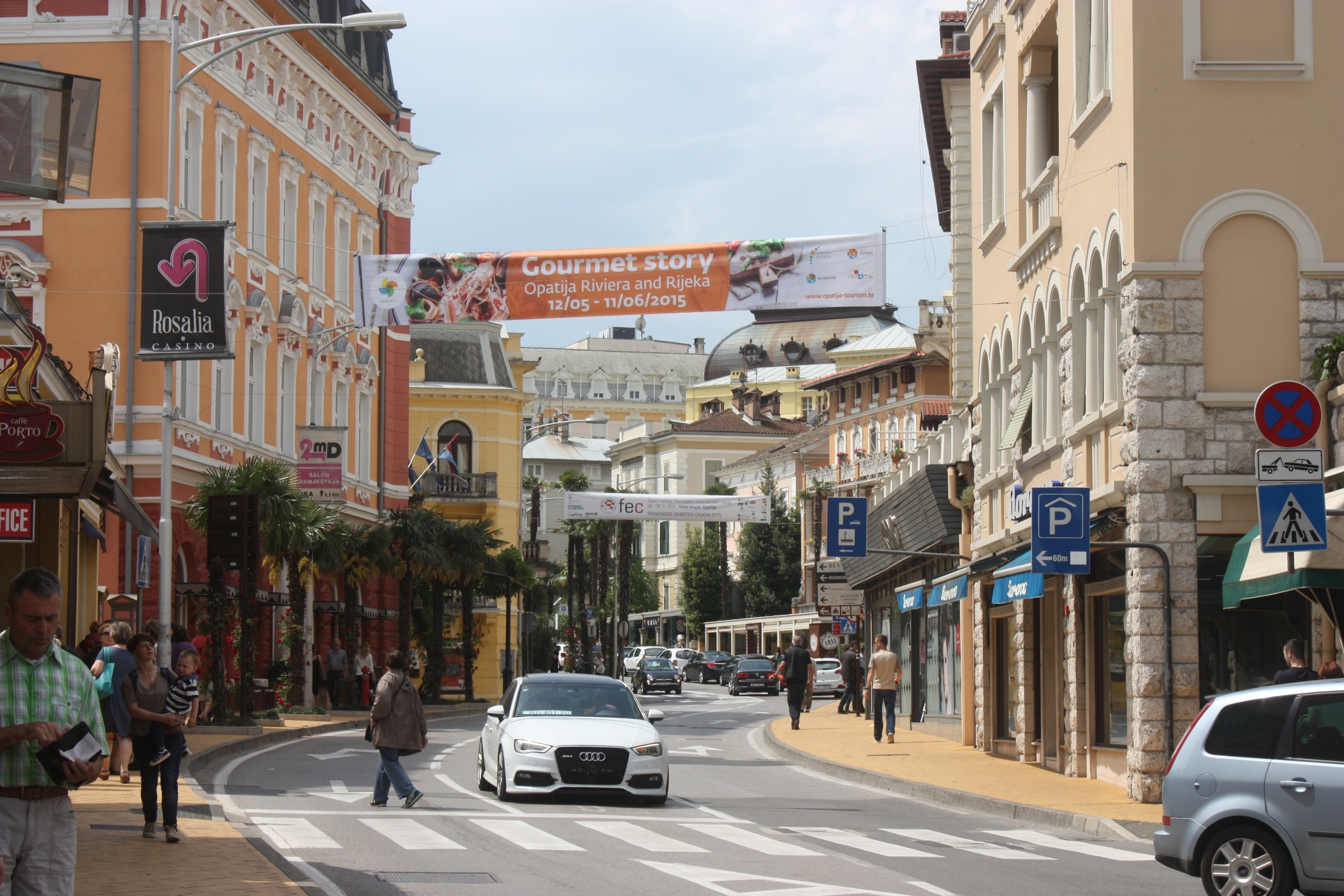
Streets of Opatija

The 14th-century Benedictine abbey, Opatija Sv. Jakova ("Abbey of Saint Jacob"), from which the town derives its name (opatija means "abbey" in Croatian, likewise for abbazia in Italian) is located in Park Svetog Jakova or Saint Jacob's Park. Saint Jacob's church, built in 1506 and enlarged in 1937, now stands on the same spot. The neo-Romanesque Church of the Annunciation with its pronounced green cupola, was designed in 1906 by architect Karl Seidl.

Another sight is the Villa Angiolina, built in 1844 by Iginio Scarpa. This villa, transformed into a museum. Since 1844. Villa Angiolina had many prominent guests

Opatija is known for the Maiden with the seagull, a statue by Zvonko Car (1956), which is positioned on a promontory by the Juraj Šporer art pavilion. It has turned into one of symbols of Opatija. A gilded variant of the statue Madonna, that once stood here but was demolished by communists after the end of World War II, now stands in front of Saint Jacob's Church.

The town park Angiolina contains many species of plants from all over the world. It has been protected since 1968. Close-by, vis-a-vis Hotel Imperial, stands the statue The Fountain - Helios and Selena, a work of the Austrian sculptor Hans Rathautsky from 1889. There is a 12 km-long promenade along the entire riviera, the Lungomare from Volosko, via Opatija, to Lovran and a 7 km-long forest path walk, the Šetalište Carmen Sylve, named after Elisabeth of Wied, Queen consort of Romania, widely known by her literary name of Carmen Sylva.

== Film location ==
Several scenes of "The Legacy Run" were shot in Opatija.

== Sports ==
NK Opatija is the city's professional association football club. It was founded in 1911 and currently plays in the First Football League, the country's second-tier league.

The Opatija Circuit was a motorsport racetrack used between 1931 and 1977, including the Yugoslavian motorcycle Grand Prix.

== Notable people ==
- Theodor Billroth (1829–1894), died in Opatija
- Robert Gerle (1924–2005), born in Opatija
- Drago Gervais (1904–1957), born in Opatija
- Kosta Hakman (1899–1961), died in Opatija
- Franz Graf von Meran (1839–1891), died in Opatija
- Frank Horvat (1928-2020), born in Opatija
- Andrija Mohorovičić (1857–1936), born in Opatija
- Leo Sternbach (1908–2005), born in Opatija
- Gyula Szapáry (1832–1905), died in Opatija
- Vedrana Rudan (1949-2026), born in Opatija

== Gallery ==
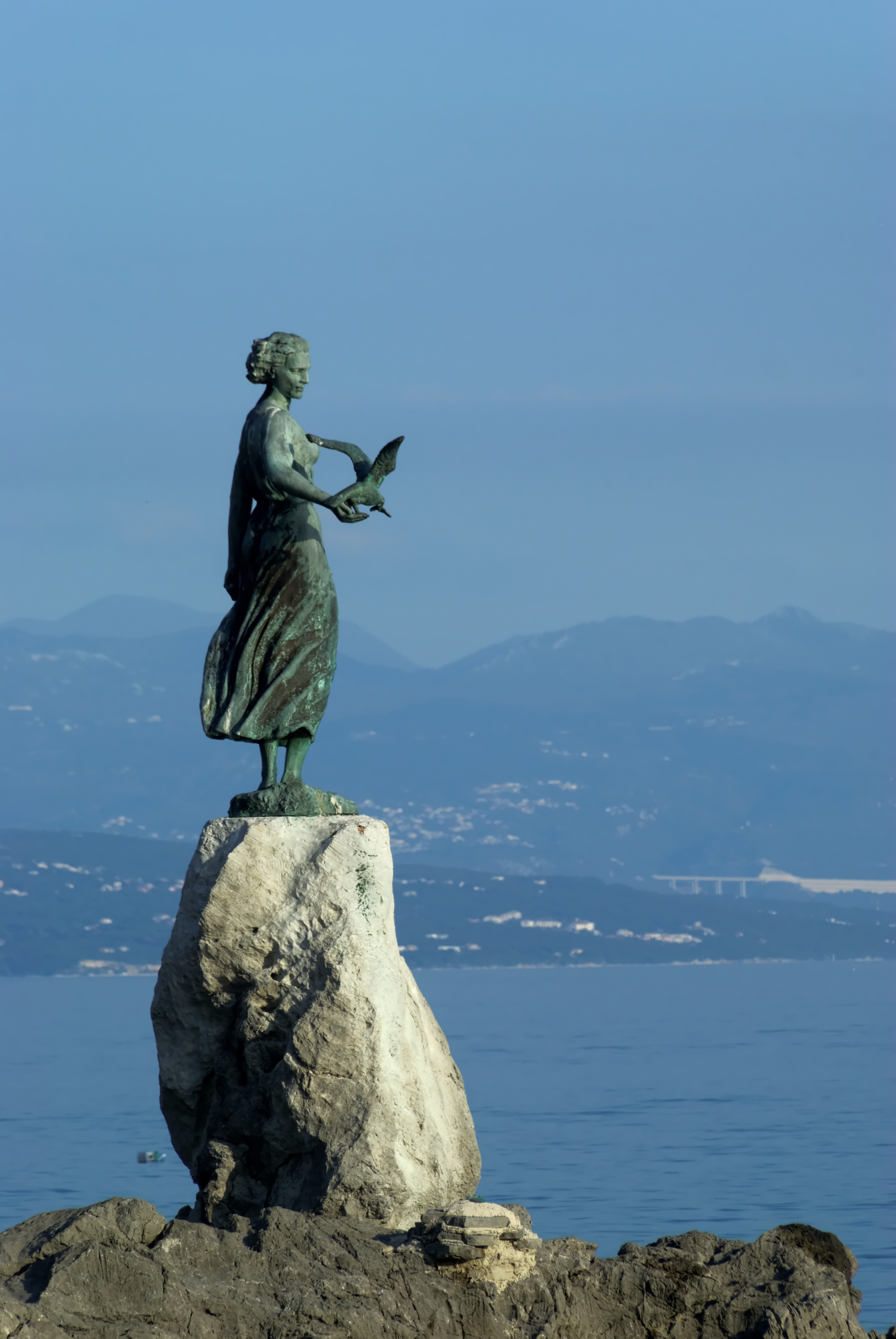
Maiden with the Seagull

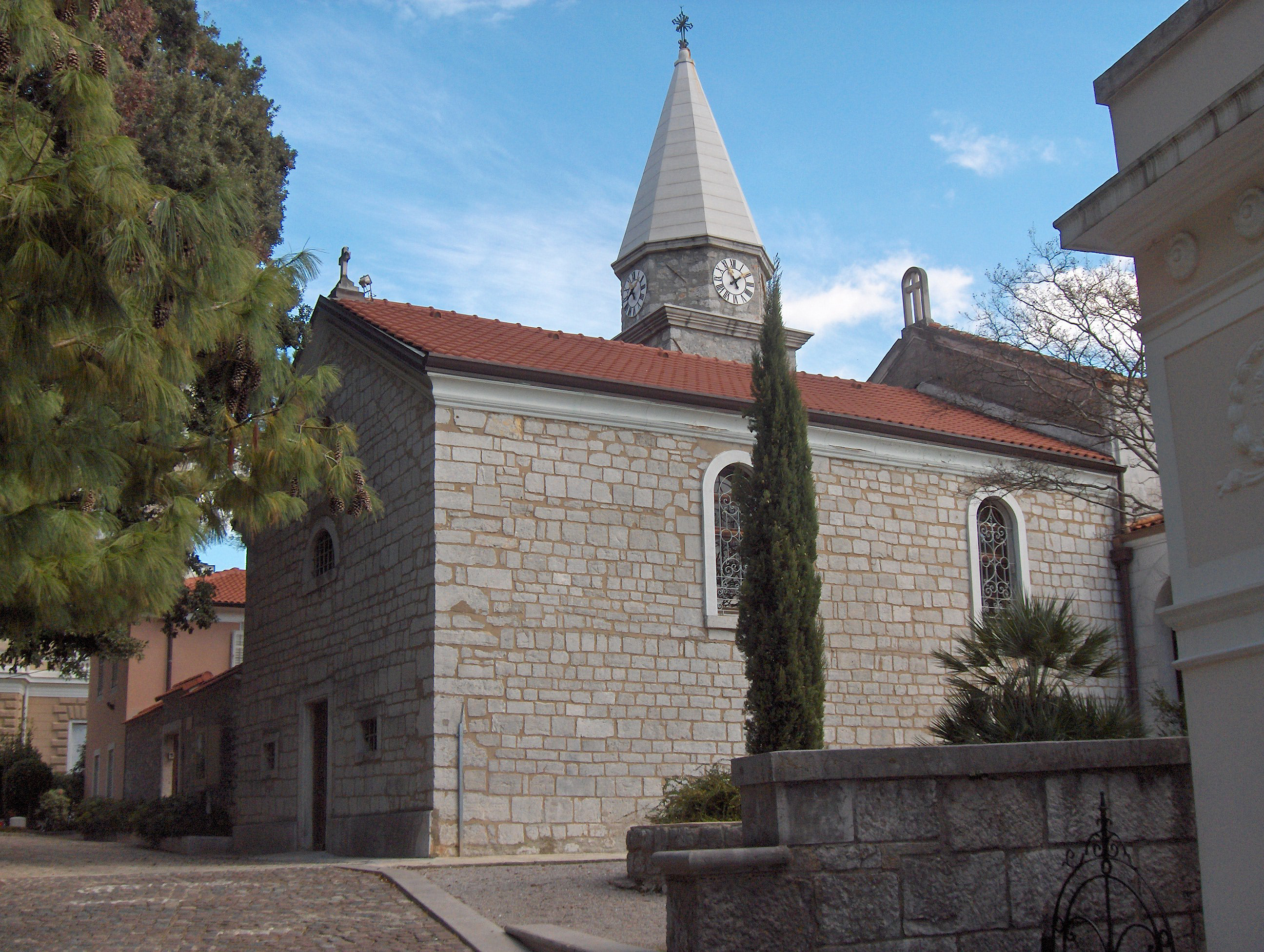
St. Jacob's Church

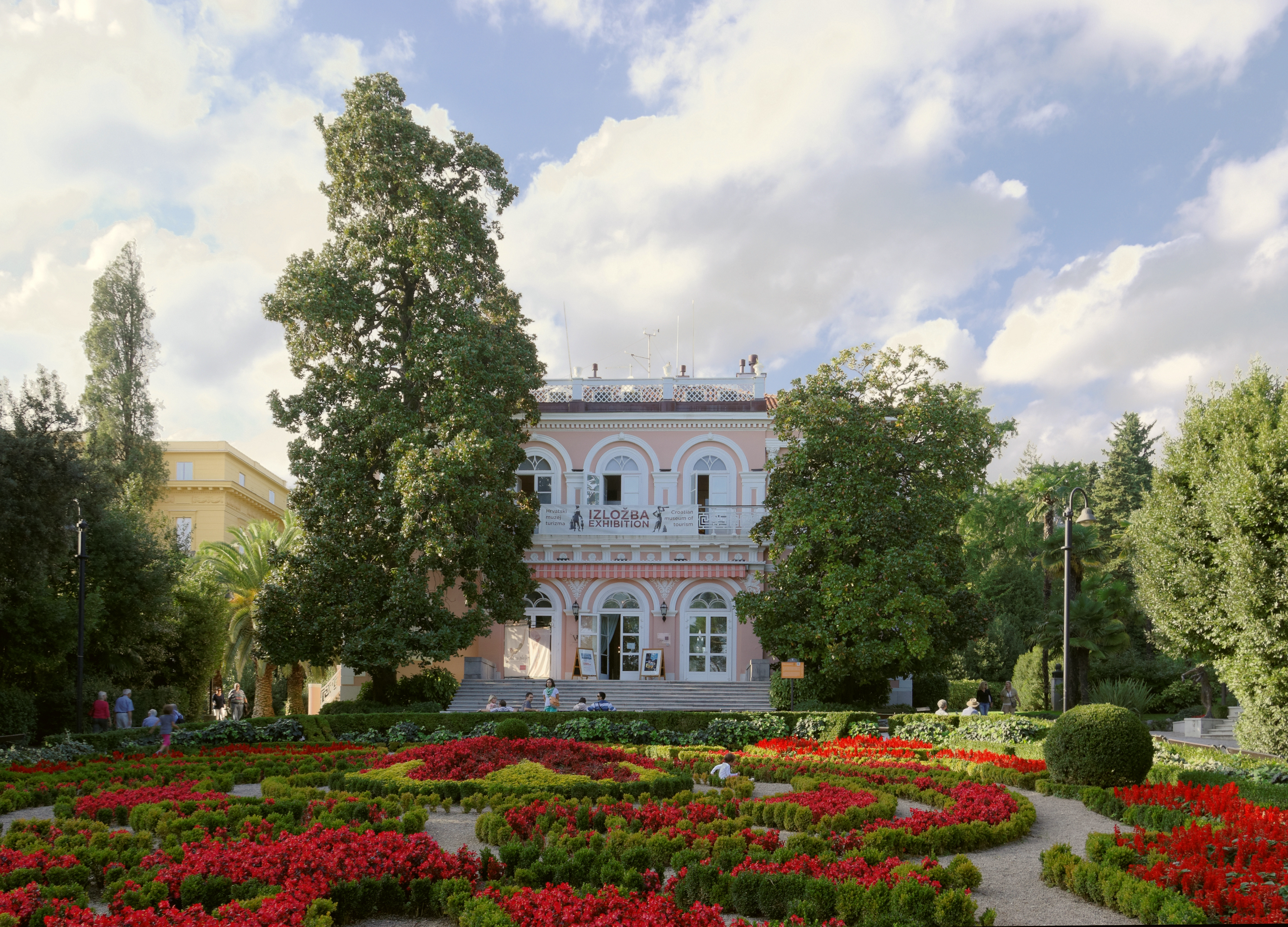
Villa Angiolina

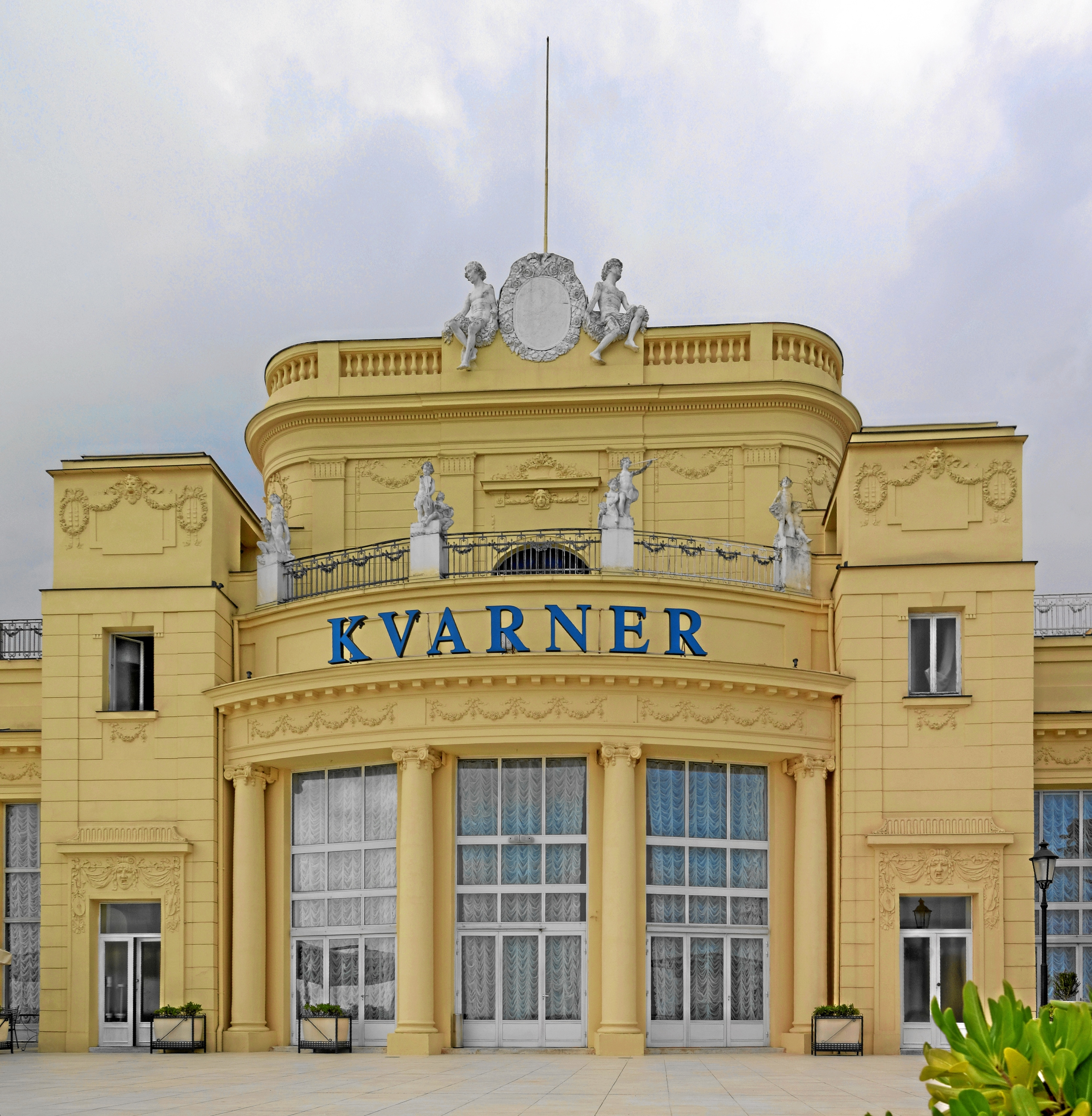
Hotel Kvarner

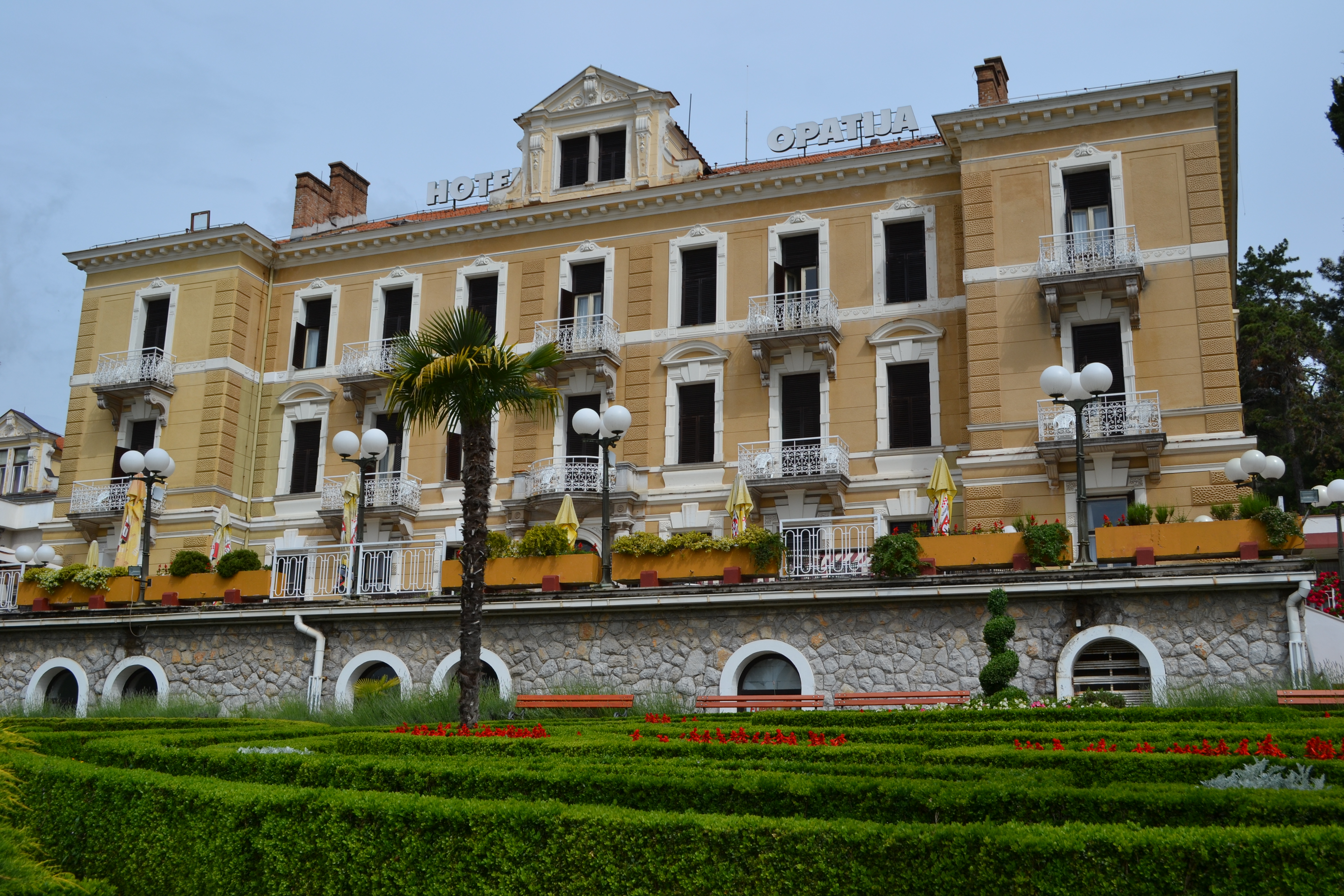
Hotel Opatija

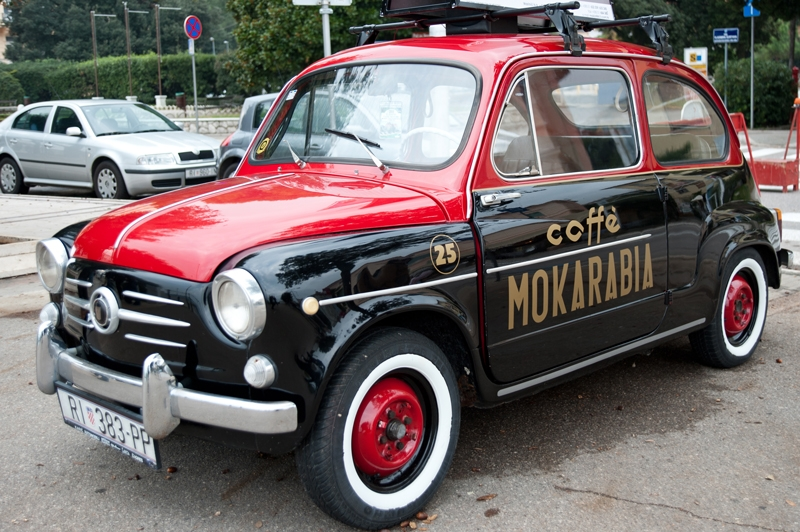
Fiat Mokarabia at the Chocolate Festival

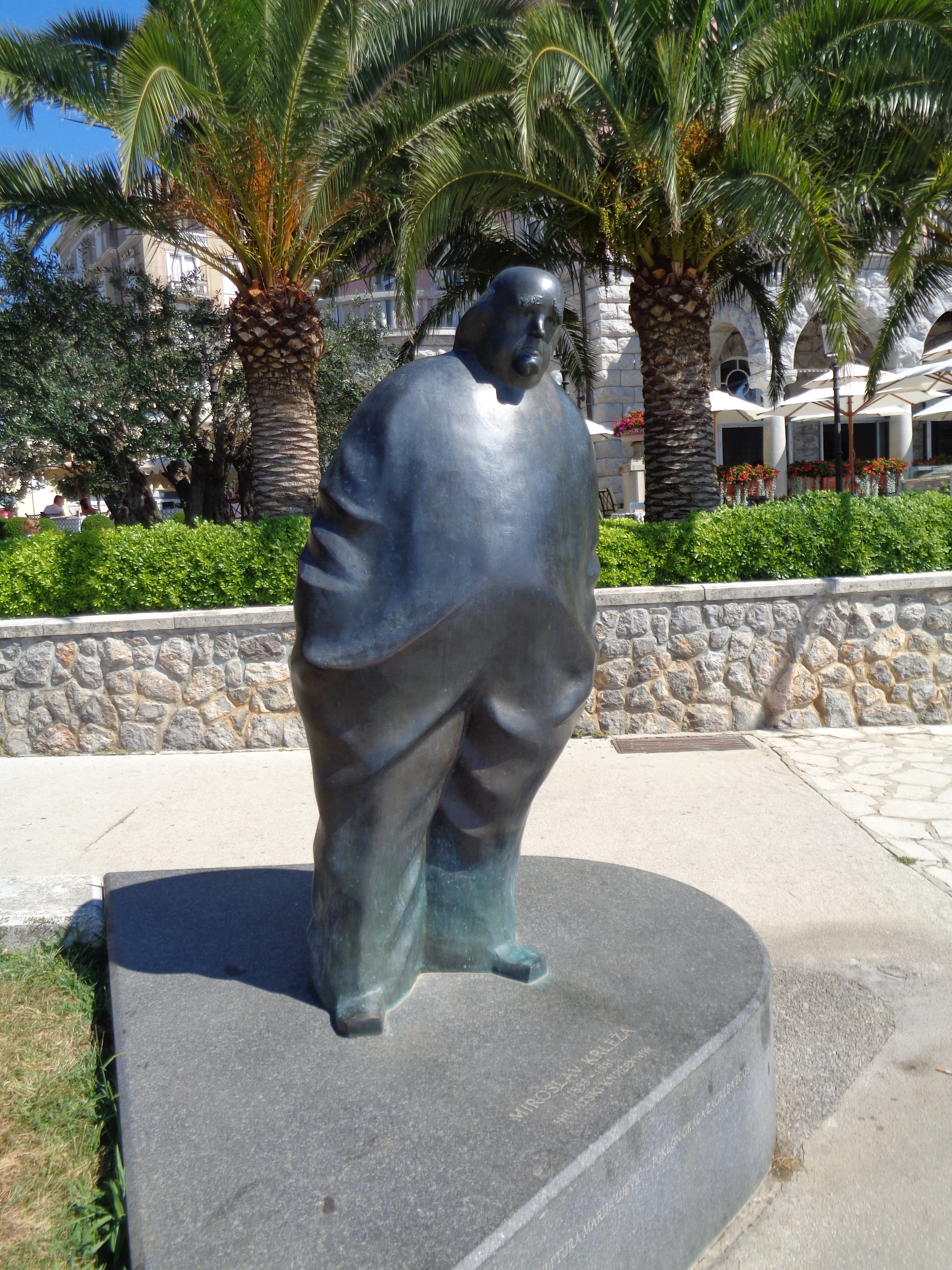
Miroslav Krleža statue

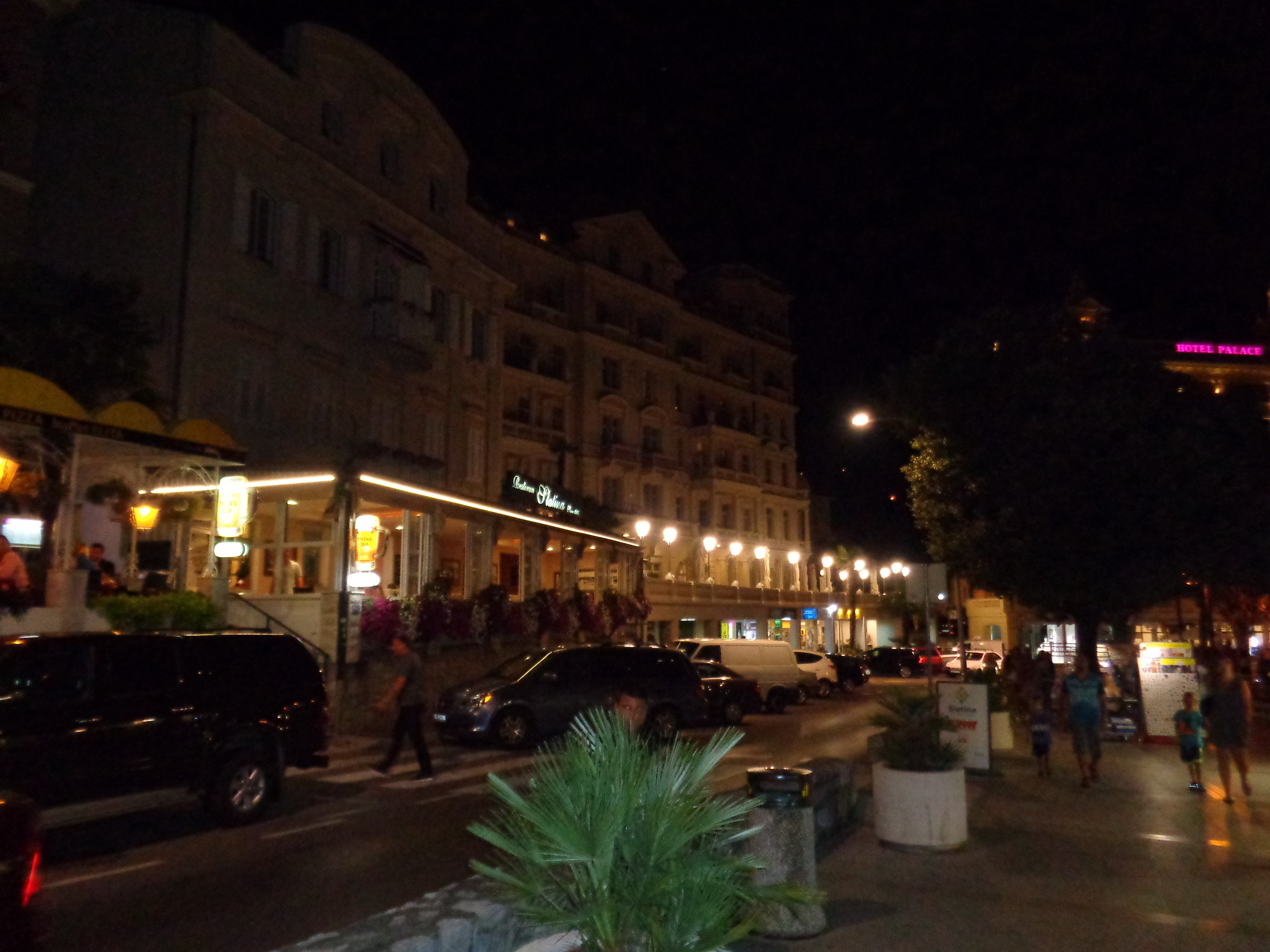
Opatija at night

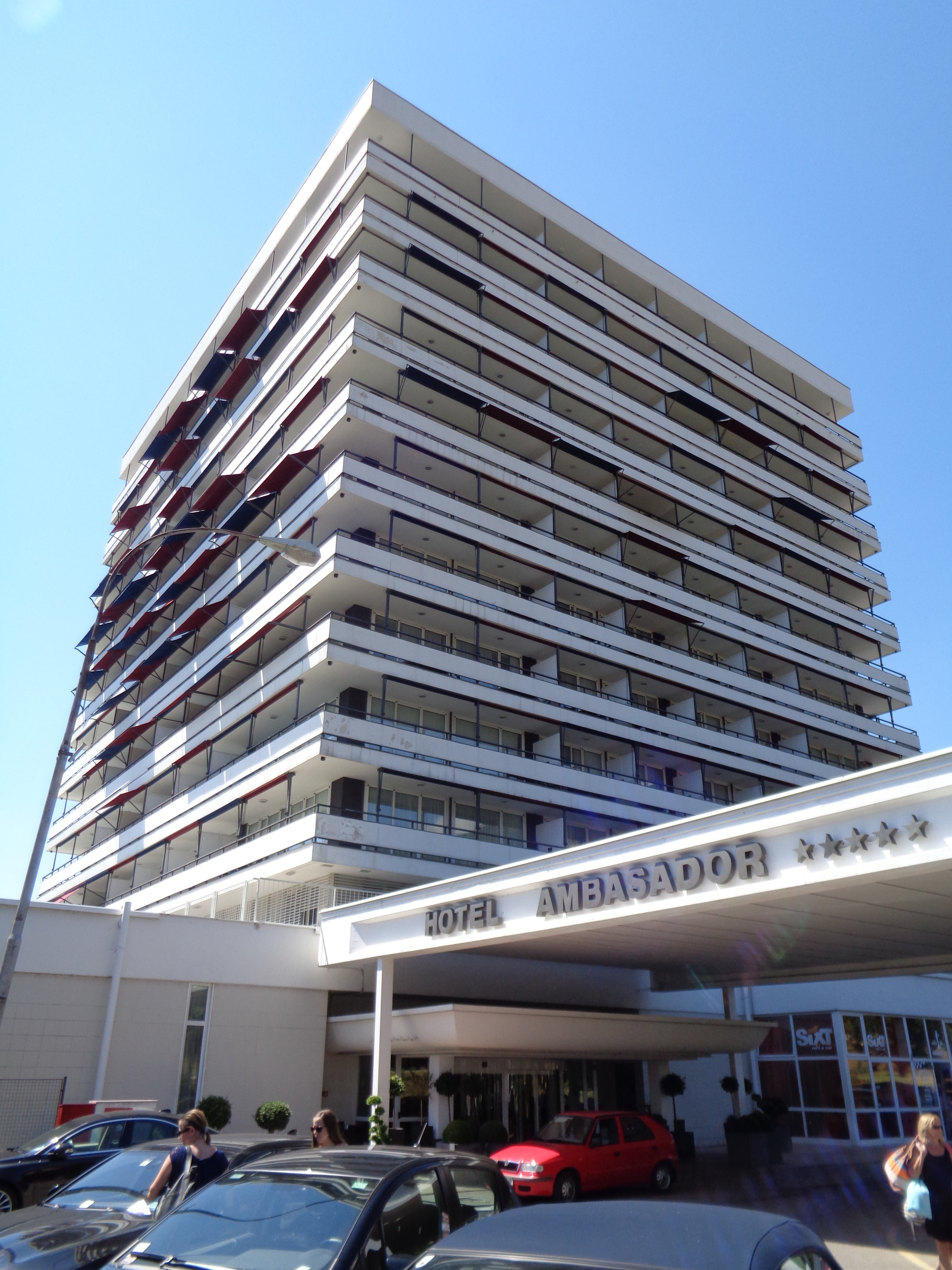
"Ambasador" Hotel

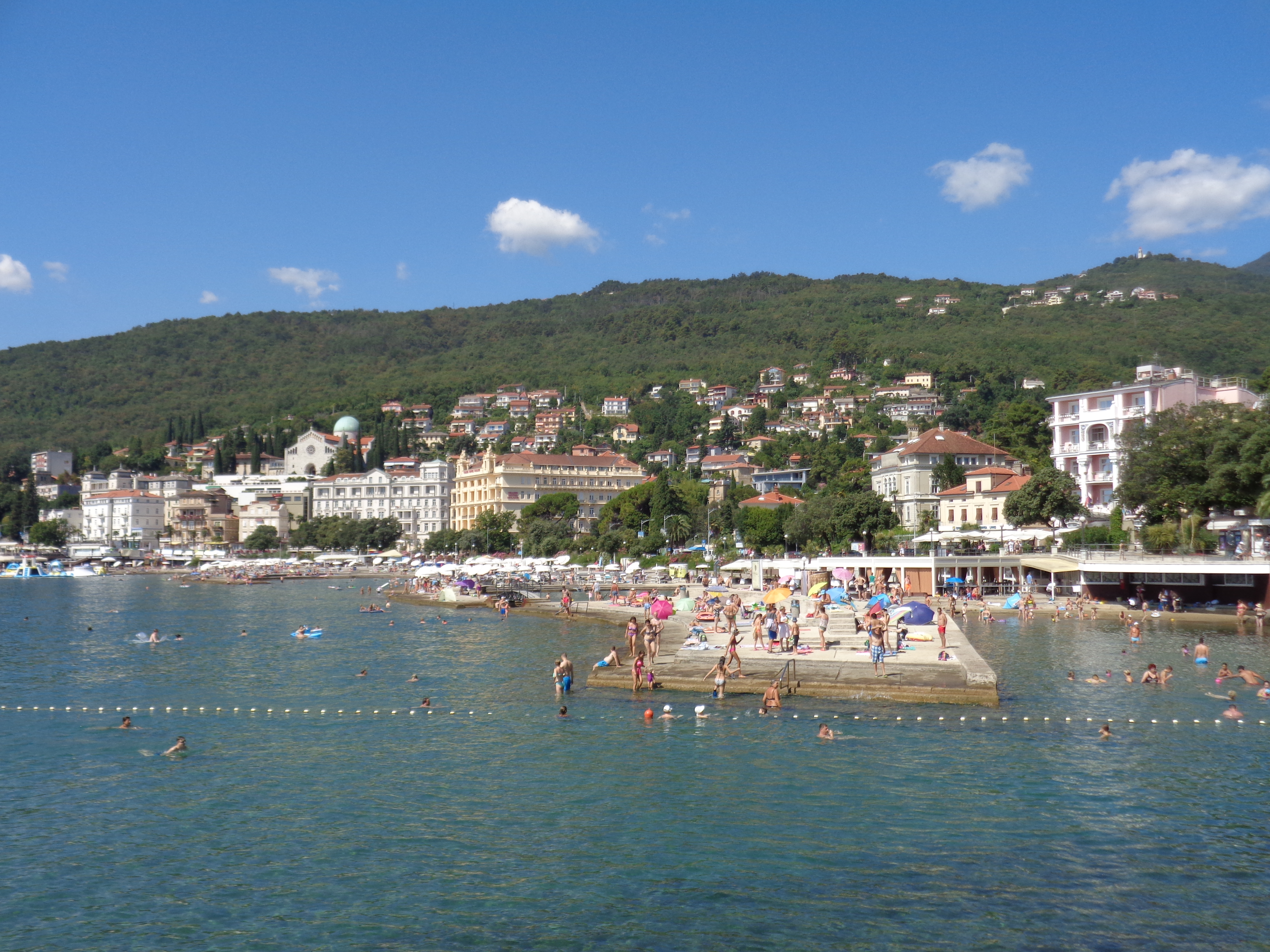
Beaches

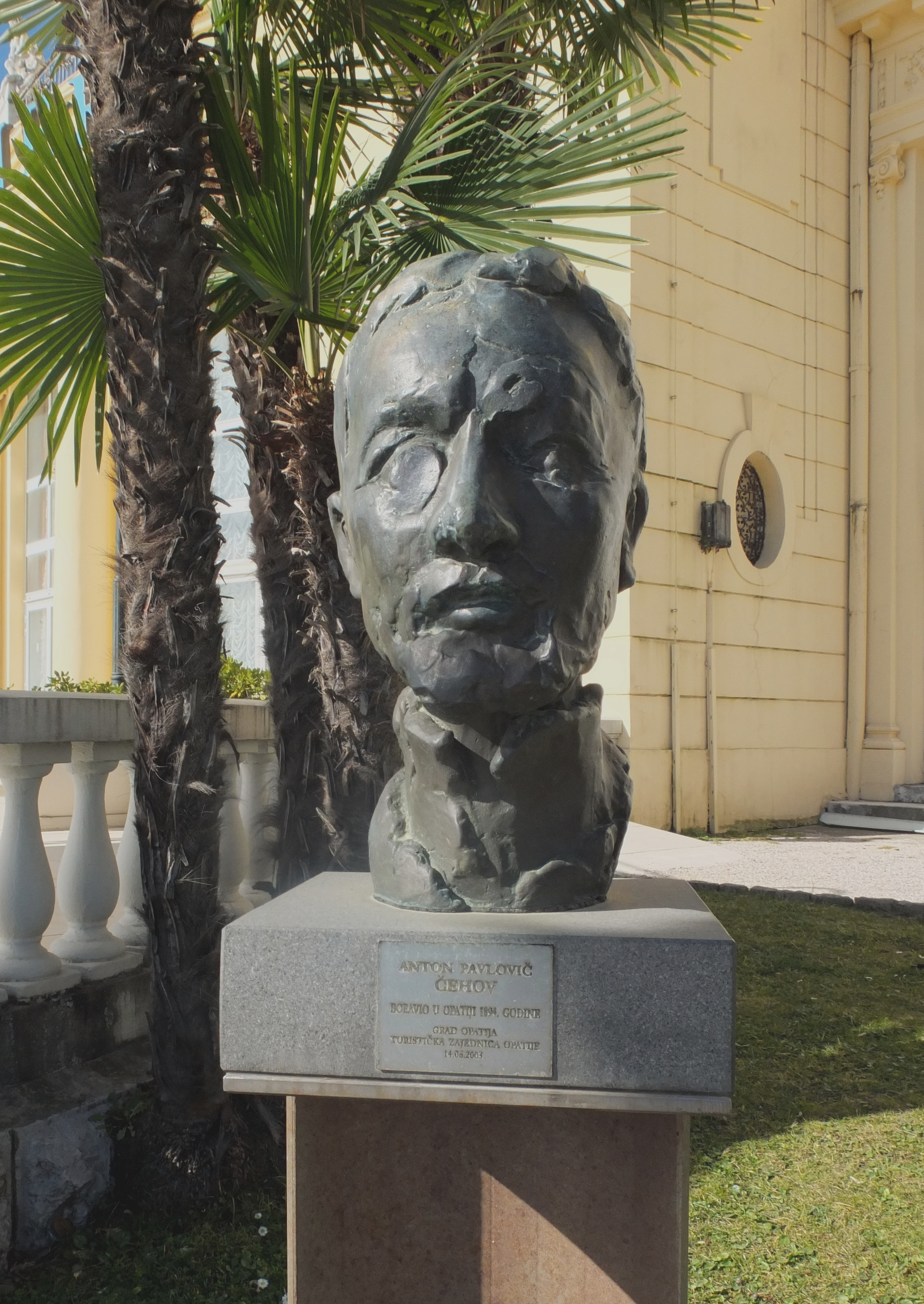
Bronze bust of Anton Chekhov

== Twin towns—Sister cities ==
Opatija is twinned with:

- Castel San Pietro Terme, Italy
- Ilirska Bistrica, Slovenia
- Balatonfüred, Hungary
- Carmagnola, Italy
- Bad Ischl, Austria
- Ferrara, Italy

== See also ==
- Opatija Circuit
