= Princess Maria of Romania (1870–1874) =

Romanian princess

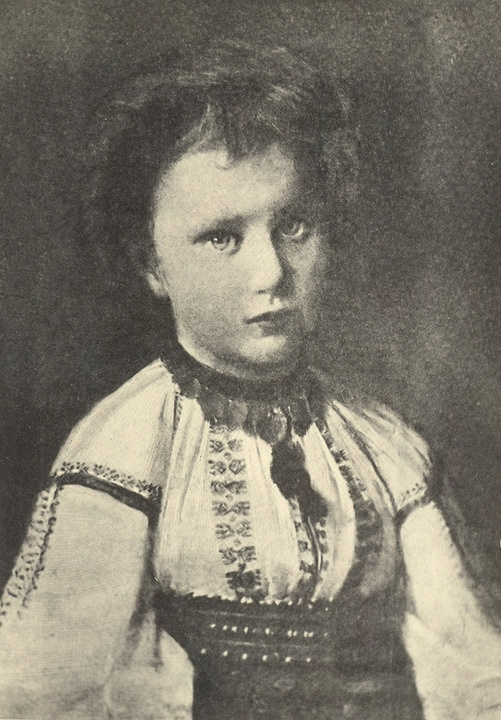
- Princess Maria, c. 1873
- Born: 8 September 1870; Golescu Mansion, Bucharest, United Principalities of Moldavia and Wallachia
- Died: 9 April 1874 (aged 3); Peleș Castle, Sinaia, United Principalities of Moldavia and Wallachia
- Burial: Cotroceni Palace (1874–1916); Curtea de Argeș Cathedral (from 1916)
- House: Hohenzollern-Sigmaringen
- Father: Carol I, Prince of Romania
- Mother: Elisabeth of Wied

Princess Maria of Romania (Romanian: Prinţesa Maria a României; 8 September [O.S. 27 August] 1870 – 9 April [O.S. 28 March] 1874) was the only child of Prince (later King) Carol I of Romania and Elisabeth of Wied.

== Life ==
Princess Maria was born in Bucharest as the first Princess of Romania that was also of the House of Hohenzollern-Sigmaringen, on 8 September [O.S. 27 August] 1870. After a month, she was baptised as a Romanian Orthodox at the monastery of Cotroceni (near the site of the present-day Cotroceni Palace). In her family, the young princess was nicknamed "Mariechen" (a possible homage to her parents' German heritage) or "Itty" (derived from little). Everyone who knew Maria described her as a beautiful and precocious young child, as she was said to look at maps and identify different countries for fun at the age of only two and a half.

Maria had no prospect of inheriting her father's throne; the 1866 Constitution limited succession to males.

== Death ==
On 5 April [O.S. 24 March] 1874, the Princess became ill with scarlet fever. An epidemic had been ravaging the capital at the time. She was immediately transported to the Peleș Castle. Despite being treated with much care by a doctor named Theodori and many others, the young princess died on 9 April [O.S. 28 March] 1874 and was buried at the monastery of Cotroceni. The funeral service took place at the Cotroceni Church within the grounds of the Cotroceni Royal Palace. The coffin was covered with white satin, criss-crossed with silver lace ornaments and was as large as one for an adult, because the infant princess' body was enclosed in several decreasing size caskets placed one inside another. After the religious service in the Romanian Orthodox rite, the cortege walked through the palace gardens to the burial place next to the palace church. Those gardens were the favorite playing grounds for the young princess, where only half a dozen days previously she had played with her nurse.

== Legacy ==
Maria's parents were devastated by her death. On 5 May that year, Carol wrote to his father Karl Anton, Prince of Hohenzollern, that he and Elisabeth intended to move to the Cotroceni Palace, in order to be closer to the resting place of their infant daughter:

Elisabeth's nerves are so shaken that the greatest care is necessary. I must confess to you that I am often anxious myself, and am much depressed by pain, sorrow, and apprehension. I get but very little sleep at night, and have repeatedly heard my poor Elisabeth cry out in her dreams: 'Dead, dead!'. This cry of pain is each time a fresh stab in my wounded heart!

In another letter to Lascăr Catargiu, he wrote:

The sweetest memory which our lost daughter has left us as an inestimable treasure is her boundless love for the country in which she was born, a love so strong that despite her tender age she felt the pangs of homesickness during her first stay abroad.

Maria's death worsened the relationship between Carol and Elisabeth, and they did not have any further children. In 1875, Karl Storck created a bust of the sleeping princess which was erected by her tomb. This bust inspired Elisabeth to write many emotional poems. When Queen Elisabeth died in 1916, according to her wishes, her daughter's remains were exhumed and the casket placed on her coffin for the public procession. Mother and daughter were then buried together in the same tomb at the Cathedral of Curtea de Argeș. At the Elisabeta Palace, an 1880s style piece of furniture contains a plaster-mold of the infant princess.

== Gallery ==
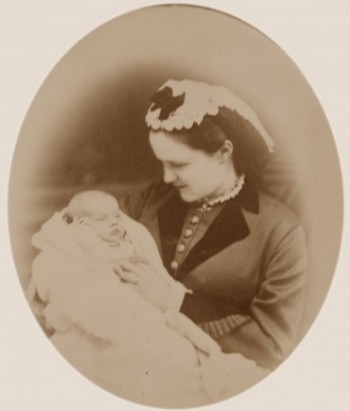
Princess Maria and her mother shortly after her birth, in 1870.

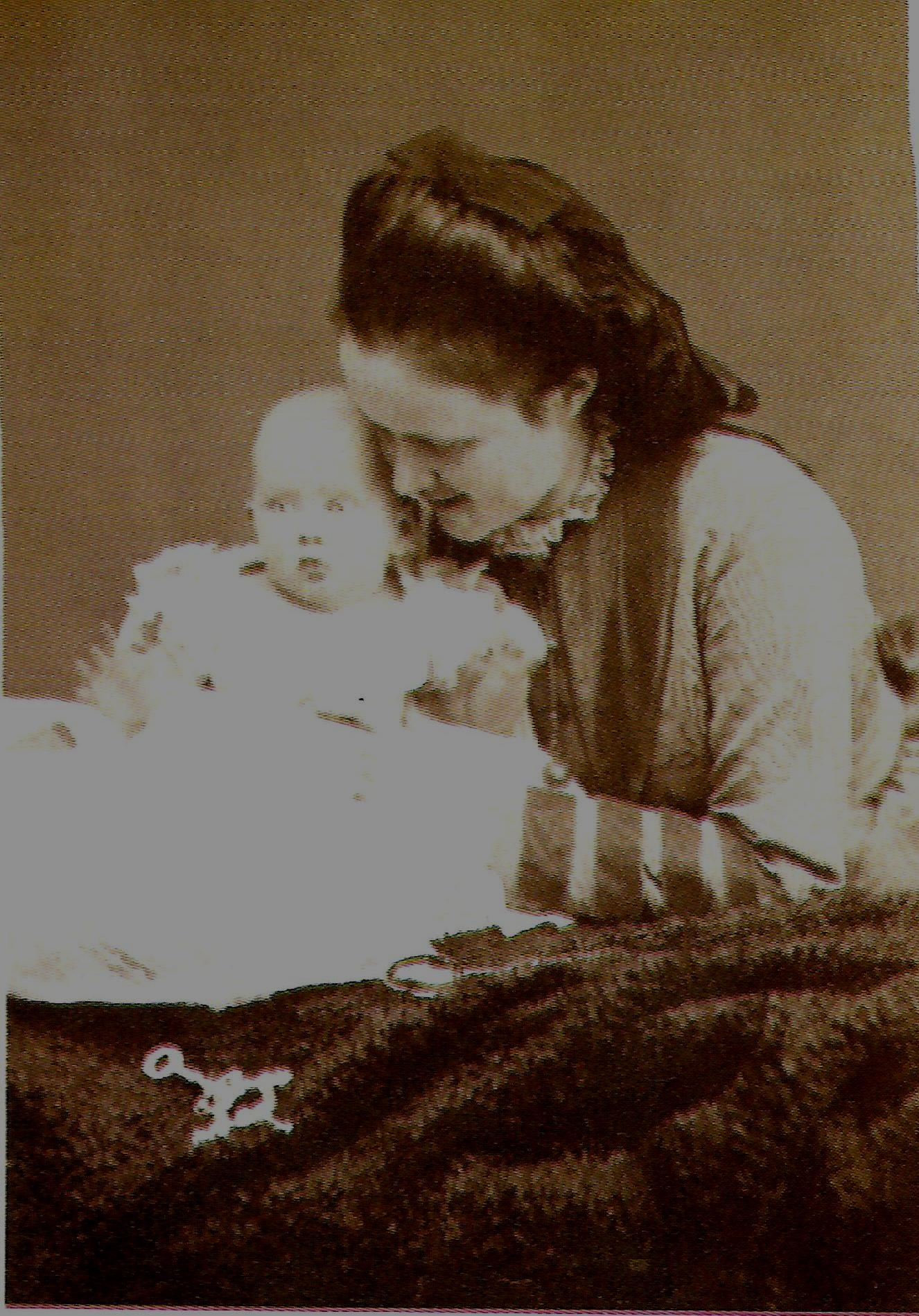
Maria and her mother in 1871.

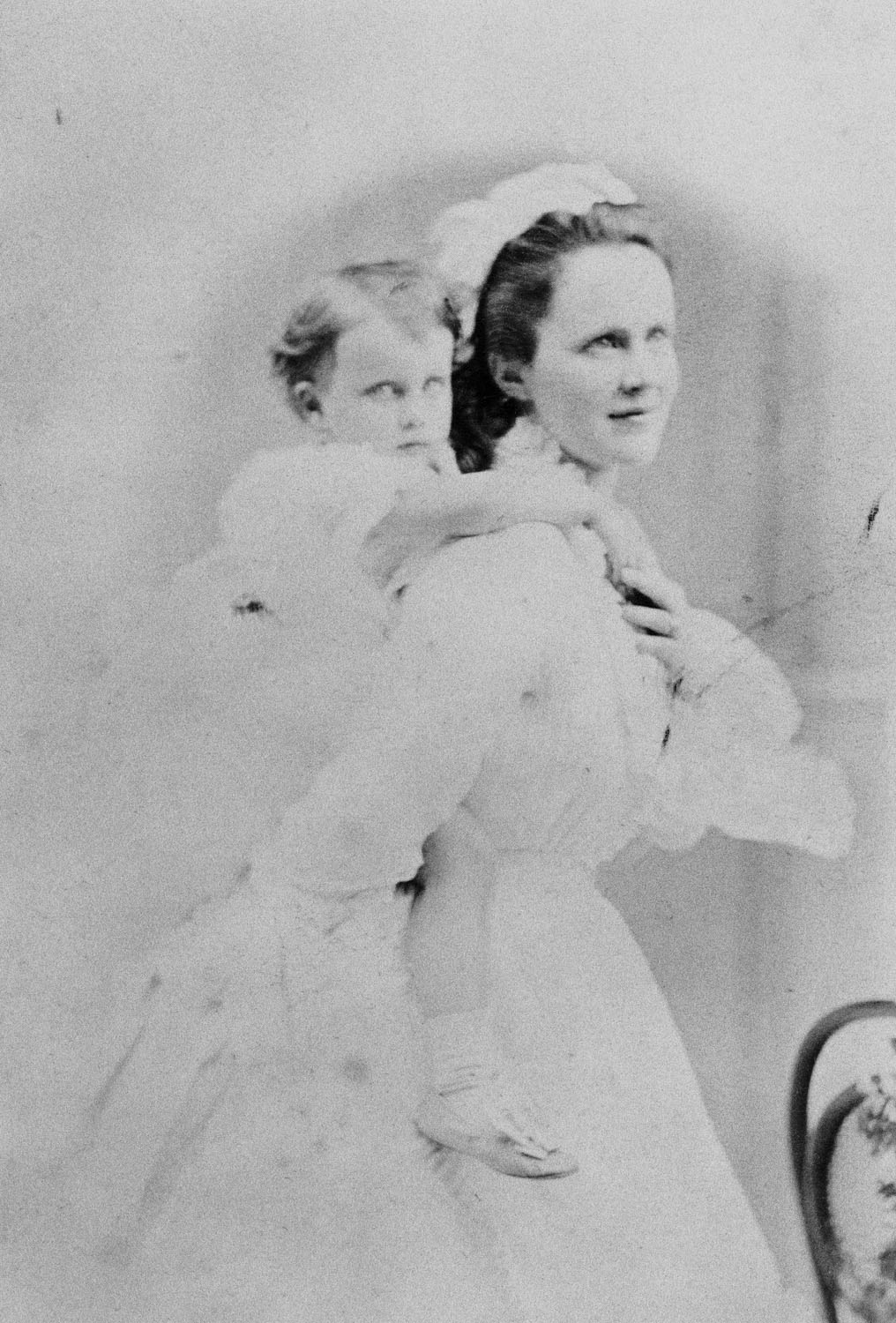
Princess Maria with her mother in 1872.

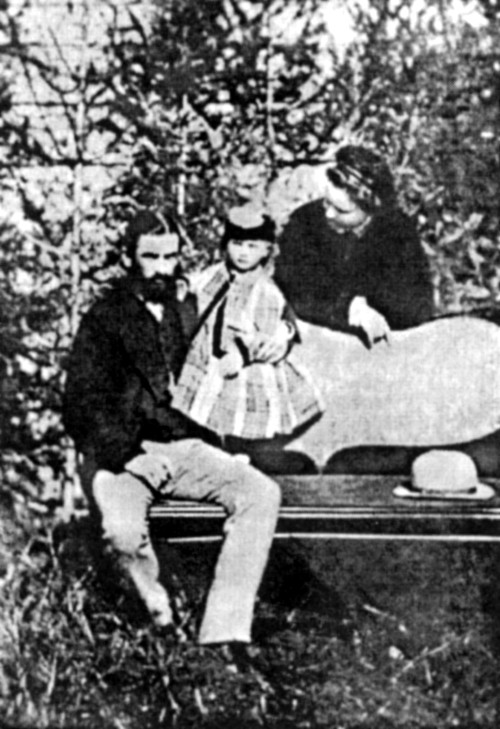
Maria with her parents in 1873.

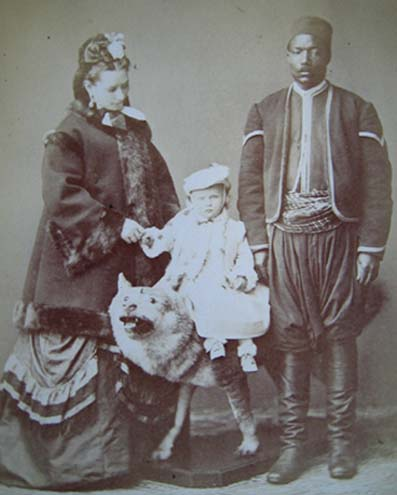
Princess Maria with her nanny, c. 1873.

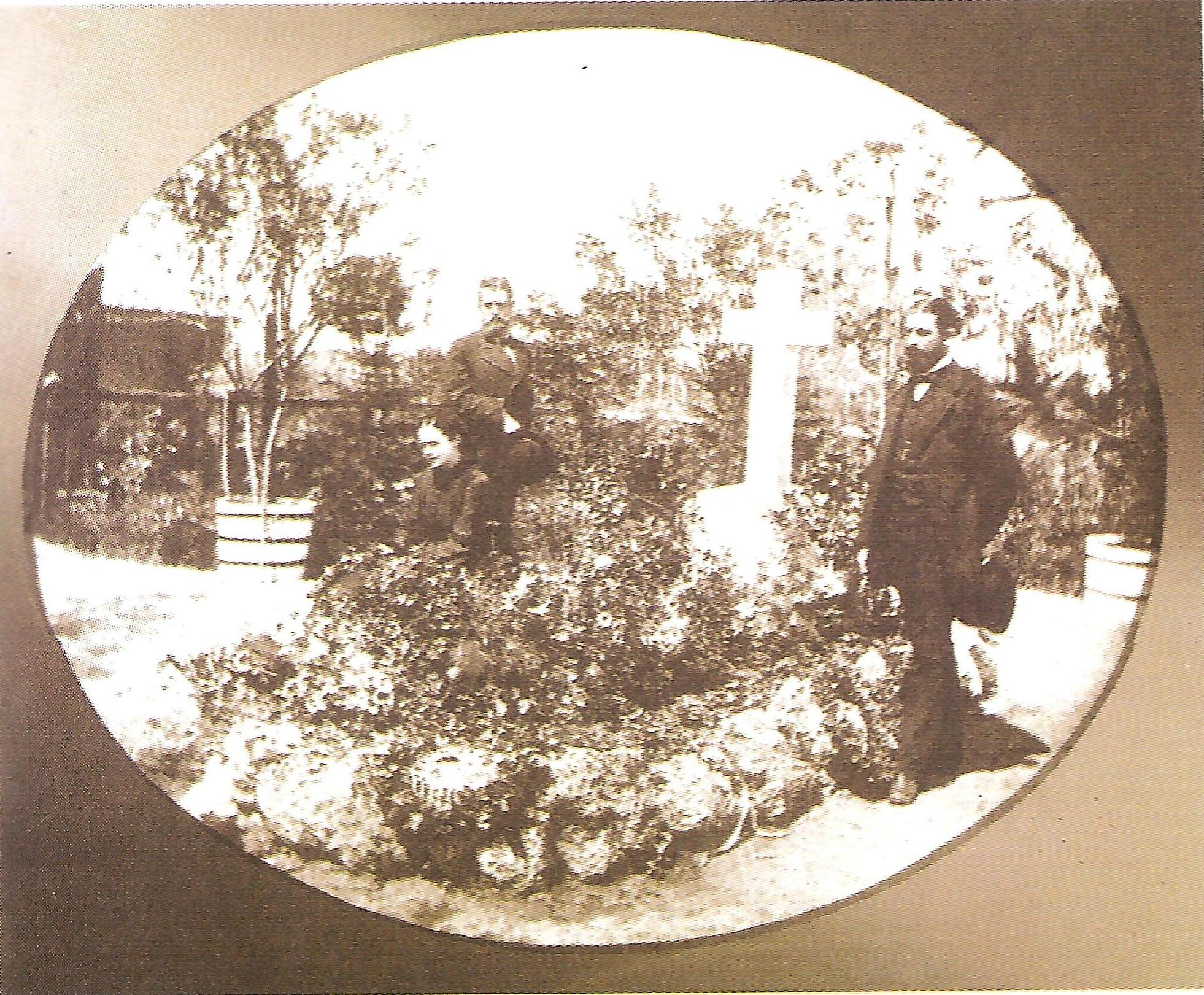
Prince Carol I and Princess Elisabeth at Maria's grave shortly after her death.

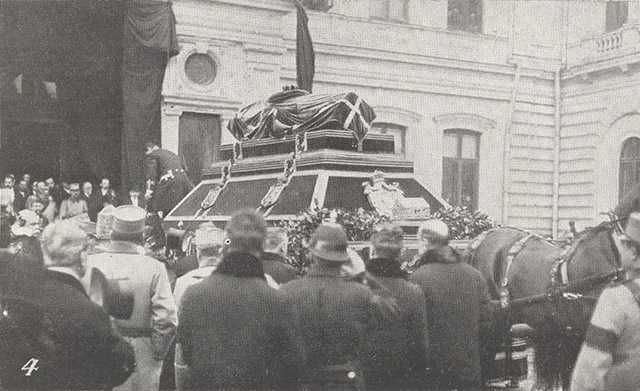
Marie's remains being taken to the Cathedral of Curtea de Argeș, in 1916.

== Ancestors ==
Ancestors of Princess Maria of Romania (1870–1874)

8. Karl, Prince of Hohenzollern-Sigmaringen
4. Karl Anton, Prince of Hohenzollern
9. Marie Antoinette Murat
2. Carol I, Prince of Romania
10. Charles, Grand Duke of Baden
5. Princess Josephine of Baden
11. Stéphanie de Beauharnais
1. Princess Maria of Romania
12. Johann August Karl, Prince of Wied
6. Hermann, Prince of Wied
13. Princess Sophie Auguste of Solms-Braunfels
3. Princess Elisabeth of Wied
14. William, Duke of Nassau
7. Princess Marie of Nassau
15. Princess Louise of Saxe-Hildburghausen

== Bibliography ==
- Muzeul Naţional de Istorie a României (2009). Familia regala. O istorie in imagini [The Royal Family. A History in Images] (in Romanian). Cetatea de Scaun. ISBN 978-973-8966-97-0.
