= Van Bergen =

van Bergen is a Dutch toponymic surname meaning "from/of Bergen". Most commonly this refers to Bergen in Dutch Limburg, Bergen op Zoom, Bergen in North Holland, or Mons in Hainaut (known as Bergen in Dutch). People born in Belgium oder the United States typically bear the surname Van Bergen. Notable people with the surname include:

- Adriaen van Bergen (fl. 1590), Dutch participant of the Eighty Years' War
- Anthony Van Bergen (1786–1859), American politician and judge
- Anthony T. Van Bergen (1827–1912), American businessman
- Barbara van Bergen (born 1978), Dutch wheelchair basketball player and para-alpine skier
- Carolin van Bergen (1964–1990), German actress, daughter of Ingrid van Bergen
- Cornelis van Bergen (1458–1509), Dutch admiral
- Dirck van Bergen (1645–1700), Dutch landscape painter
- Harry Van Bergen (1871–1963), American competitive sailor
- Ingrid van Bergen (1931–2025), German actress
- John S. Van Bergen (1885–1969), American architect
- Julia van Bergen (born 1999), Dutch singer
- Lewis Van Bergen (1938–2018), American actor
- Mitchell van Bergen (born 1999), Dutch football forward
- Peter A. Van Bergen (1763–1804), American politician and judge
- Ryan Van Bergen (born 1989), American football player
- Tjapko van Bergen (1903–1944), Dutch rower
- Willem van Bergen (1551–1609), Flemish noble and bishop of Antwerp

Van Glymes van Bergen

- Anton van Glymes van Bergen (1500–1541), First Margrave of Bergen op Zoom
- Cornelis van Glymes van Bergen (1490?–c.1560), Prince-bishop of Liège 1538–1544
- Jan III van Glymes van Bergen (1452–1532), Lord of Bergen op Zoom
- Jan IV van Glymes van Bergen (1528–1567), Second Margrave of Bergen op Zoom
- Robert van Glymes van Bergen (c. 1520–1565), Prince-bishop of Liège 1557–1563

== See also ==
- Van Bergen House, historic house in Greene County, New York
- Van Bergen's Regiment of Militia, New York militia led by Antony Van Bergen
- Bergen (name), a surname (including a list of people with this surname)
