= Anthony T. Van Bergen =

American businessman (1827–1912)

Anthony Van Bergen
- Born: Anthony Thomas Van Bergen; January 7, 1827; New Baltimore, New York, US
- Died: February 18, 1912 (aged 85); Paris, France
- Spouse: Julia Augusta Peirson (m. 1864; died 1897)
- Children: Charles Van Bergen; Harry Van Bergen; Countess Alice Grote
- Parent(s): Clarine Peck Van Bergen; Anthony Van Bergen
- Relatives: Peter A. Van Bergen (grandfather)

Anthony Thomas Van Bergen (January 7, 1827 – February 18, 1912) was a prominent and wealthy American businessman who lived in Paris.

== Early life ==
Van Bergen was born on January 7, 1827, in New Baltimore, New York, and grew up at the Van Bergen homestead there. He was the youngest son of ten children born to Clarine (née Peck) Van Bergen (1785–1872) and Anthony Van Bergen, a judge and Democrat who represented Greene County in the New York State Assembly and served as the first president of the New York State Agricultural Society. Among his siblings were Lucy Ann Van Bergen (wife of the Rev. Leonard Bronk Van Dyck); Peter A. Van Bergen (who married Lucy A. Smart); Esther Van Bergen (wife of Stephen J. Matson); Rebecca Smith Van Bergen (wife of Roswell Read Jr.); Maria Van Bergen (who died unmarried); John Peck Van Bergen (who married Margaret Baker, a daughter of the Governor Joshua Baker); and James Oliver Van Bergen (who married Harriet Lay).

His father, "an intimate friend of ex-president Martin Van Buren," was the only child of New York State Senator Peter A. Van Bergen (son of Col. Anthony Van Bergen of Van Bergen's Regiment in the Revolutionary War who was a descendant of Mayor Dirck Wesselse Ten Broeck) and Hester (née Houghtaling) Van Bergen (sister of Assemblyman Coenradt T. Houghtaling). After his grandfather's death in 1814, his grandmother remarried to Dr. James Oliver. His maternal grandfather was Capt. John Peck of Peck Tavern in Lyme, Connecticut.

== Career ==
Van Bergen moved to Brooklyn Heights with his brother John Peck Van Bergen. He worked for the Arnold Constable & Co., a department store chain in the New York City. He permanently moved to Paris where he became the representative of the firm abroad under his firm, A. Van Bergen & Company of New York. All three of his children were born in Paris. He was also the foreign representative for the Equitable Life Assurance Society, a large American insurance company, for which he served on the board of directors for many years. He was an American Commissioner to the Paris exhibitions of 1878 and 1889.

In 1899, he reported having crossed the Atlantic by boat at least 70 times, including aboard the RMS Oceanic in 1903. In 1880, he was made an Officer of the Legion of Honour.

== Personal life ==
On July 21, 1864, Van Bergen was married to Julia Augusta Peirson (1843–1897) in Isleworth, London. Julia was a daughter of Julia Frances and Charles Peirson of Arnold Constable & Co. They lived at 118 Champs-Élysées in Paris and were the parents of three children:

- Charles Peirson Van Bergen (1869–1944), a University of Paris trained physician who married Amelia Louise "Millie" Thorn (1871–1923), a daughter of Francis Shaw Thorn and Georgianna (née Stevenson) Thorn, in Buffalo, New York, in December 1896; he lived at 869 Delaware Avenue in Buffalo and a mansion in Paris. He remarried and moved to Glendale, California.
- Henry "Harry" Anthony Van Bergen (1871–1963), who competed at the 1900 Summer Olympics in Le Havre, France; he married Ethel Irvin (1874–1947), a daughter of Alexander Proudfit Irvin and Susan Sherman (née Taylor) Irvin and granddaughter of Richard Irvin, at the American Cathedral in Paris in November 1901; they lived at the Avenue du Trocadéro in Paris, then Attingham Park in England (which they leased from Thomas Noel-Hill, 8th Baron Berwick). In 1904, he established the American Hospital Association of Paris with Dr. A.J. Magnin which aimed to offer expatriates access to American-trained doctors in the Paris suburb of Neuilly-sur-Seine.
- Alice Van Bergen (1877–1960), who married Count Otto Grote (1861–1942) of Schloss Varchentin in Mecklenburg in 1900. His sister, Countess Thyra Grote, married German diplomat Martin Rücker von Jenisch, in 1905. In 1918 during World War I, Alice was among the American heiresses, including Countess Gladys Vanderbilt Széchenyi, who had married German or Austrian subjects and had their property confiscated by the U.S. Government. She later lived in Paris and Montreux, Switzerland.

His wife died in Paris on November 21, 1897. Van Bergen died at his home on Champs-Élysées in Paris on February 18, 1912. They were both buried at St. Peter and St. Paul Churchyard in Pettistree in Suffolk, England.

=== Descendants ===
Through his second son Harry, he was a grandfather of four, including Suzanne Ethel Van Bergen (1902–1977), Anthony Harry Van Bergen (1904–1968), Alice Van Bergen (1909–2005) (who married Charles William Francis Busk in India in 1934), and Edith Florence Van Bergen (1913–1999).

Through his daughter Alice, he was a grandfather of Count Frederick (who married American Rachel Derby Smith), Countess Zia, and Countess Antoinette Julia Grote (1902–1988), who married Prince Dietrich of Wied (1901–1976), a son of William Frederick, 6th Prince of Wied and Princess Pauline of Württemberg (the elder daughter of King William II of Württemberg), in 1928. Their son, Van Bergen's great-grandson, was Prince Ulrich of Wied (1931–2010), who was the father of Princess Marie of Wied (b. 1973), who married Duke Friedrich of Württemberg (1961–2018), eldest son of Carl, Duke of Württemberg and heir to the House of Württemberg, in 1993.
