= Harry Van Bergen =

American sailor (1871–1963)

Personal information
- Nationality: American
- Born: Henry Anthony Van Bergen; April 15, 1871 Paris, France
- Died: December 31, 1963 (aged 92) Chelsea, England

Sailing career
- Sport: Sailing
- Club: CVP; Yacht Club de France
- Class: 20+ ton
Medal record
Sailing
Representing United States
Olympic Games
Bronze medal – third place	1900 Paris	20+ ton

Henry Anthony "Harry" Van Bergen (April 15, 1871 – December 12, 1963) was an American sailor who competed in the 1900 Summer Olympics in Le Havre, France. Van Bergen took the bronze in the 20+ ton.

== Early life ==
Van Bergen was born in Paris on April 15, 1871. He was the second of three children born to wealthy Americans Julia Augusta (née Peirson) Van Bergen (1843–1897) and Anthony T. Van Bergen, the Paris representative of Arnold Constable & Co., the Equitable Life Assurance Society, and an American Commissioner to the Paris exhibitions of 1878 and 1889. He had two siblings, an elder brother, Dr. Charles Peirson Van Bergen, a University of Paris trained doctor, and a younger sister, Alice Van Bergen, who married Count Otto von Grote of Schloss Varchentin in 1900. His niece, Countess Antoinette Julia Grote, married Prince Dietrich of Wied, a son of William Frederick, 6th Prince of Wied and Princess Pauline of Württemberg (the elder daughter of King William II of Württemberg), in 1928.

His paternal grandfather was Judge Anthony Van Bergen, a close friend of former president Martin Van Buren who served was a Democratic representative for Greene County in the New York State Assembly and served as the first president of the New York State Agricultural Society. His grandfather was the only child of New York State Senator Peter A. Van Bergen (son of Col. Anthony Van Bergen of Van Bergen's Regiment in the Revolutionary War who was a descendant of Mayor Dirck Wesselse Ten Broeck).

== Career ==
In 1904, he established the American Hospital Association of Paris with Dr. A.J. Magnin which aimed to offer expatriates access to American-trained doctors in the Paris suburb of Neuilly-sur-Seine.

=== Olympic career ===
Van Bergen represented America at the 1900 Summer Olympics in Le Havre, France. Van Bergen took the bronze in the 20+ ton.

== Personal life ==
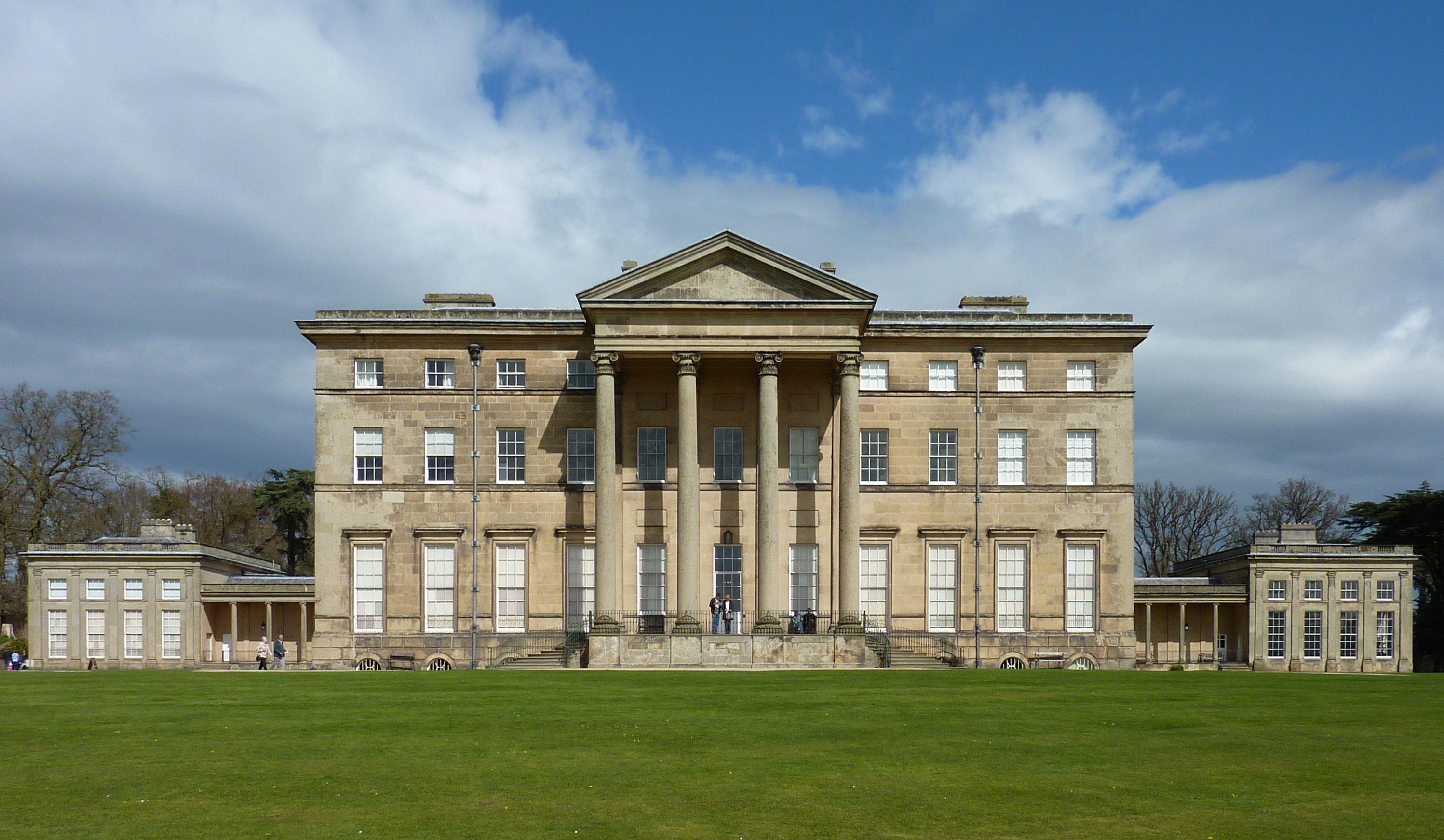
Attingham Park

In November 1901, Van Bergen was married to Ethel Irvin (1874–1947) at the American Cathedral in Paris. She was a daughter of Alexander Proudfit Irvin and Susan Sherman (née Taylor) Irvin and granddaughter of Richard Irvin, After their marriage, they lived at the Avenue du Trocadéro in Paris, before moving to England where they rented Attingham Park from Thomas Noel-Hill, 8th Baron Berwick. Together, they were the parents of four children:

- Suzanne Ethel Van Bergen (1902–1977)
- Anthony Harry Van Bergen (1904–1968)
- Alice Van Bergen (1909–2005), who married Charles William Francis Busk in India in 1934.
- Edith Florence Van Bergen (1913–1999).

Van Bergen died on December 12, 1963.
