= Ilse Koch =

German war criminal (1906–1967)

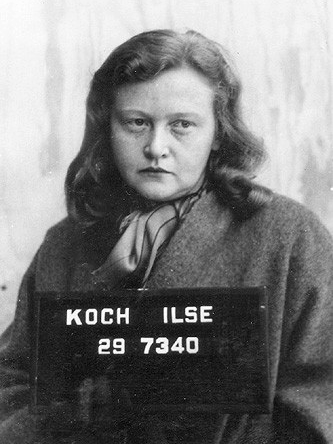
- Koch, c. 1945
- Born: Margarete Ilse Köhler; 22 September 1906; Dresden, German Empire
- Died: 1 September 1967 (aged 60); Aichach, West Germany
- Cause of death: Suicide by hanging
- Other names: The Bitch of Buchenwald; The Witch of Buchenwald
- Spouse: Karl-Otto Koch (m. 1937; died 1945)
- Children: 4
- Status: Deceased
- Convictions: U.S. Military; War crimes (1947); West Germany; Incitement to murder Incitement to attempted murder Incitement to infliction of grievous bodily harm Incitement to infliction of bodily harm (2 counts)
- Penalty: U.S. Military; Life imprisonment; commuted to 4 years imprisonment (1947); West Germany; Life imprisonment (1951)

Margarete Ilse Koch (née Köhler; 22 September 1906 – 1 September 1967) was a German war criminal who committed atrocities while her husband Karl-Otto Koch was the commandant at Buchenwald. Though Ilse Koch had no official position in Nazi Germany, she became one of the most infamous Nazi figures at the war's end and was referred to as the "Kommandeuse of Buchenwald".

Because of the egregiousness of her alleged actions, including that she had selected Jewish prisoners for death in order to fashion lampshades from human skin and other items from it, her 1947 U.S. military commission court trial at Dachau received worldwide media attention, as did the testimony of survivors who ascribed sadistic and perverse acts of violence to Koch—giving rise to the image of her as "the concentration camp murderess".

However, the most serious of these allegations was found to be without proof in two different legal processes, one conducted by an American military commission court at Dachau in 1947, and another by the West German Judiciary at Augsburg in 1950–1951. Harold Kuhn and Richard Schneider, two U.S. Army lawyers tasked with conducting the official review of her conviction at Dachau, noted that "in spite of the extravagant statements made in the newspapers, the record contains little convincing evidence against the accused ... In regard to the widely publicised charges that she ordered inmates killed for their tattooed skin, the record is especially silent".

That the wild claims were dismissed as lacking evidence did little to sway public opinion. She was known as "The Witch of Buchenwald" (Die Hexe von Buchenwald) by the inmates of the camp because of her suspected cruelty and lasciviousness toward prisoners. She has been nicknamed "The Beast of Buchenwald", the "Queen of Buchenwald", the "Red Witch of Buchenwald", "Butcher Widow", and "The Bitch of Buchenwald".

She committed suicide by hanging at Aichach women's prison on 1 September 1967 at age 60.

== Early life ==
Koch was born Margarete Ilse Köhler in Dresden, Germany, in 1906. Alongside two brothers, Koch was raised by her parents Max and Anna Köhler (née Kubisch), in a Protestant, lower-middle class household. After completing her compulsory German elementary and lower secondary schooling, she attended a trade school, where she learned secretarial skills and then found employment as a secretary in a number of local firms. During this period, Germany had not yet recovered from defeat in World War I and proved both economically and politically turbulent. In 1932, Koch joined the Nazi Party. Through her social engagement with members of the local SS detachment in Dresden, she met her future husband, Karl-Otto Koch, in 1934.

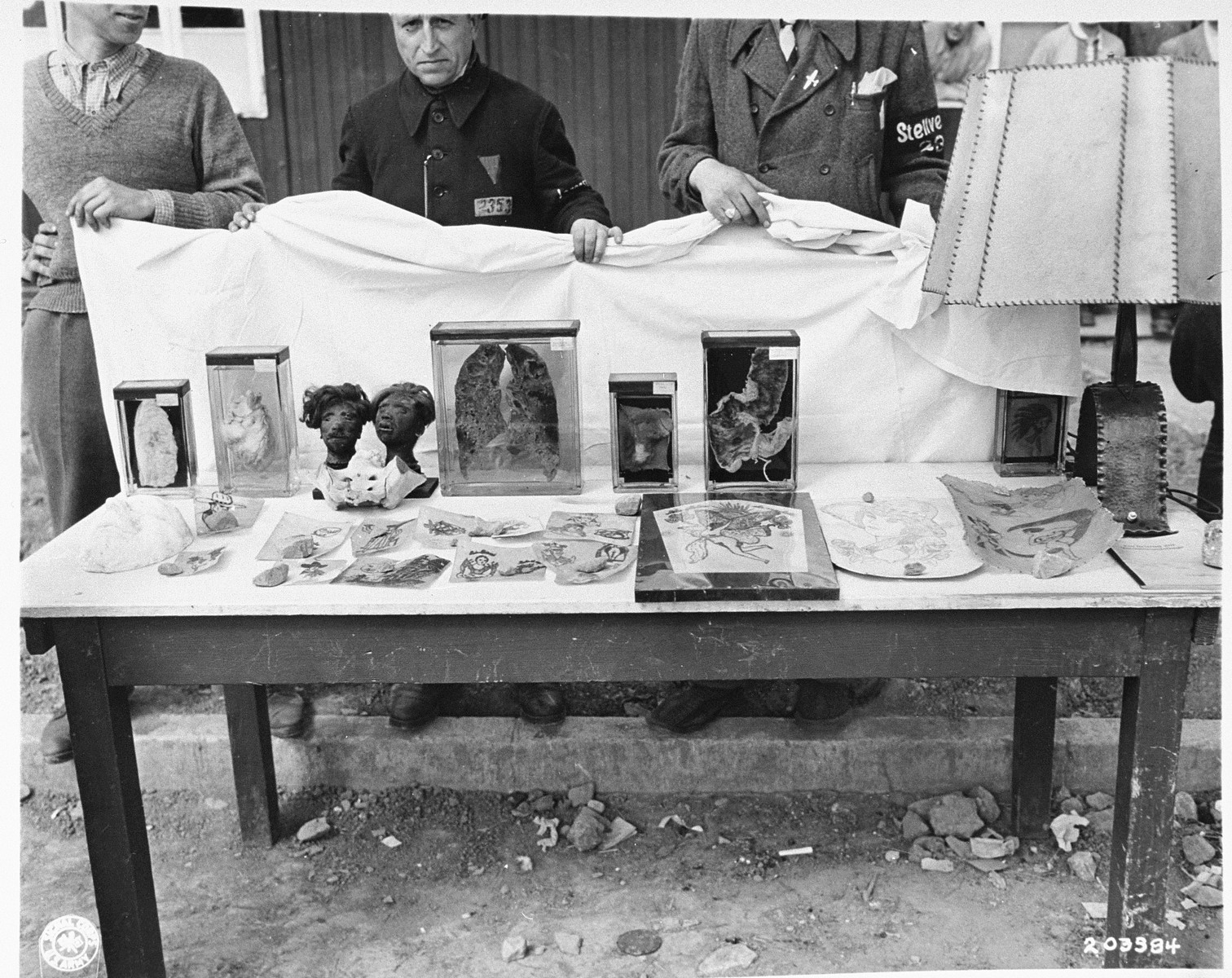
Buchenwald 16 April 1945. Collection of prisoners' internal organs and two human heads (upper left) and also examples of tattooed skins (foreground)

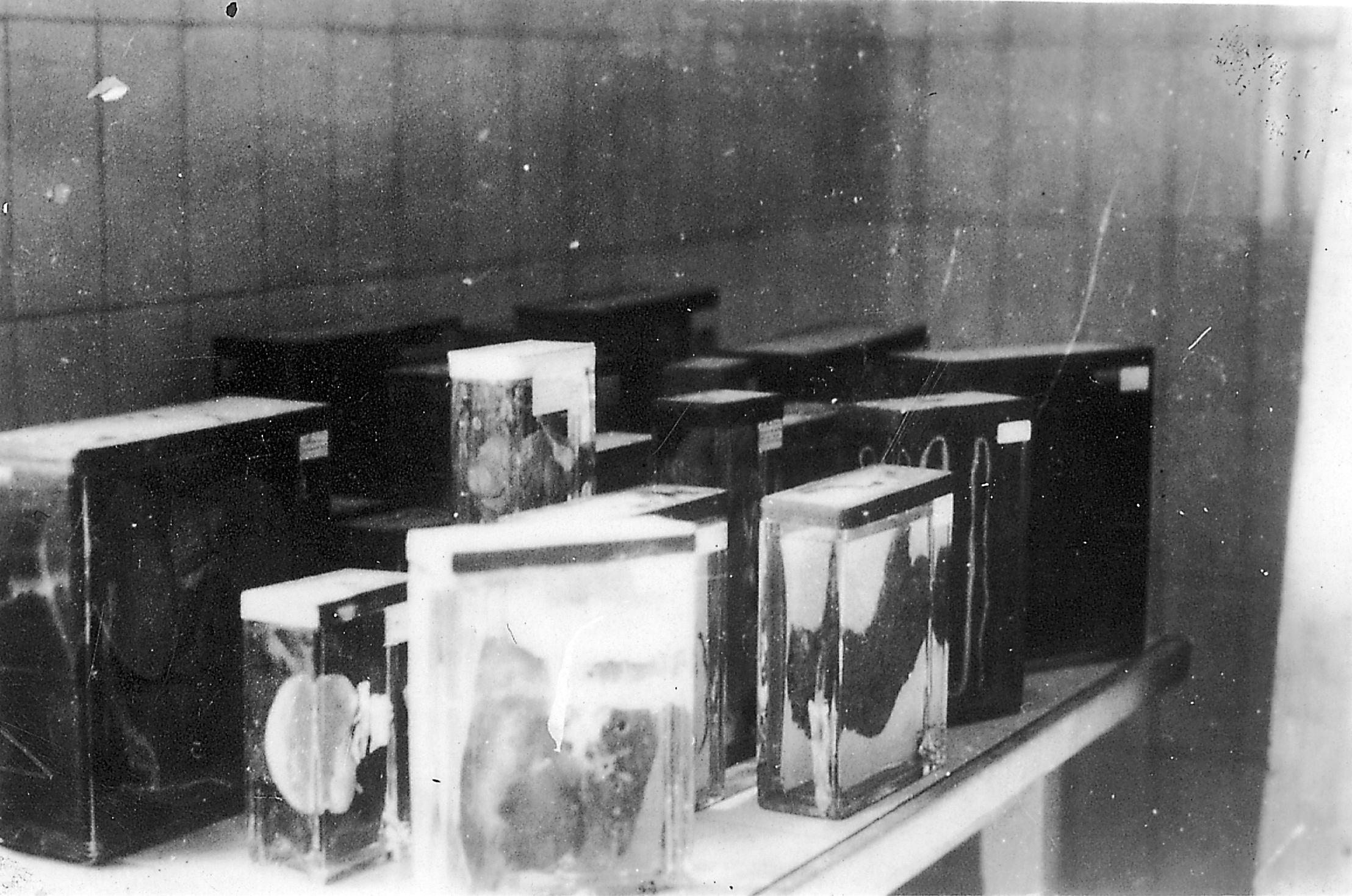
Buchenwald 16 April 1945. Collection of prisoners' internal organs. Photo taken by Jules Rouard, military volunteer incorporated to the 1st American Army, 16ème Bataillon de Fusiliers

In 1936, she followed Koch to Sachsenhausen concentration camp near Berlin, where he had been posted as Commandant. They requested permission to marry from the SS Office of Racial and Settlement Affairs, which investigated their "fitness for marriage". This was determined according to racial criteria and Ilse provided evidence of her Aryan ancestry. The couple married the following year at Sachsenhausen concentration camp.

In July 1937, Karl gave up his post at Sachsenhausen in order to establish and take command of Buchenwald. Karl and Ilse had two daughters and one son, who were all born on the Buchenwald concentration camp grounds from October 1937. The family lived in the camp commandant's three-story villa at Buchenwald and were regularly visited by SS officers Theodor Eicke and Richard Glücks, and on one occasion by the SS leader Heinrich Himmler.

== War crimes ==
Following the war, she was accused of having selected Jewish prisoners to be killed in order to have decorative objects such as lampshades and book bindings made from their skins. For example, inmates Josef Ackermann and Gustav Wegerer testified in 1950 that they had witnessed (circa August 1941) a lampshade being prepared from human skin to be presented to Ilse Koch. This crime, however, has been said to be apocryphal. While various objects fashioned from human skins were discovered in Buchenwald's pathology department at liberation, their connection to Koch was tenuous, given that she had not been at the camp since the summer of 1943. The more likely culprit was SS doctor Erich Wagner, who wrote a dissertation while serving at Buchenwald on the purported link he saw between habitual criminality and the practice of tattooing one's skin.

However, testimony from witnesses at Koch's postwar trials established that she had used slave labor at the camp; had assaulted inmates on several occasions; and had reported inmates to the camp SS for beatings that caused death on at least one occasion. In 1940, Koch also commissioned the construction of an indoor riding arena which cost over 250,000 reichsmarks ($100,000 US as per 1940 exchange rates). Prisoners were reported to have died laboring to complete its construction.

== SS investigation and trial ==
In 1941, Prince Josias von Waldeck-Pyrmont, SS and Police Leader for Weimar, began an internal investigation into Karl-Otto Koch's governance of Buchenwald, as rumors of corruption and embezzlement reached his office. After discovering significant evidence of graft, Waldeck had Karl arrested on 18 December 1941. When Karl's friend, SS chief Heinrich Himmler heard of Karl's arrest, however, he ordered him released. Karl was nonetheless relieved of his duties at Buchenwald, and sent instead to command Majdanek concentration and extermination camp. Ilse Koch continued to live in the SS settlement at Buchenwald in Karl's absence. However, on 24 August 1943, both Karl and Ilse were arrested following a renewed investigation led by SS judge Konrad Morgen. Morgen's indictment, issued 17 August 1944, formally charged Karl Koch with the "embezzlement and concealing of funds and goods in an amount of at least 200,000 RM," and the "premeditated murder" of three inmates – ostensibly to prevent them from giving evidence to the SS investigatory commission. Ilse was charged with the "habitual receiving of stolen goods, and taking for her benefit at least 25,000 RM". While Ilse Koch was acquitted at the subsequent SS trial in December 1944, Karl was found guilty, sentenced to death, and ultimately executed at Buchenwald only days prior to its liberation. Following the trial, Ilse Koch was released – having spent sixteen months in the Gestapo prison in Weimar – and moved with her two children into a small flat in Ludwigsburg. She was arrested by American occupation authorities in Ludwigsburg on 30 June 1945, after being recognized on the street by a former inmate of Buchenwald.

== Trial before the U.S. Military Commission Court at Dachau ==
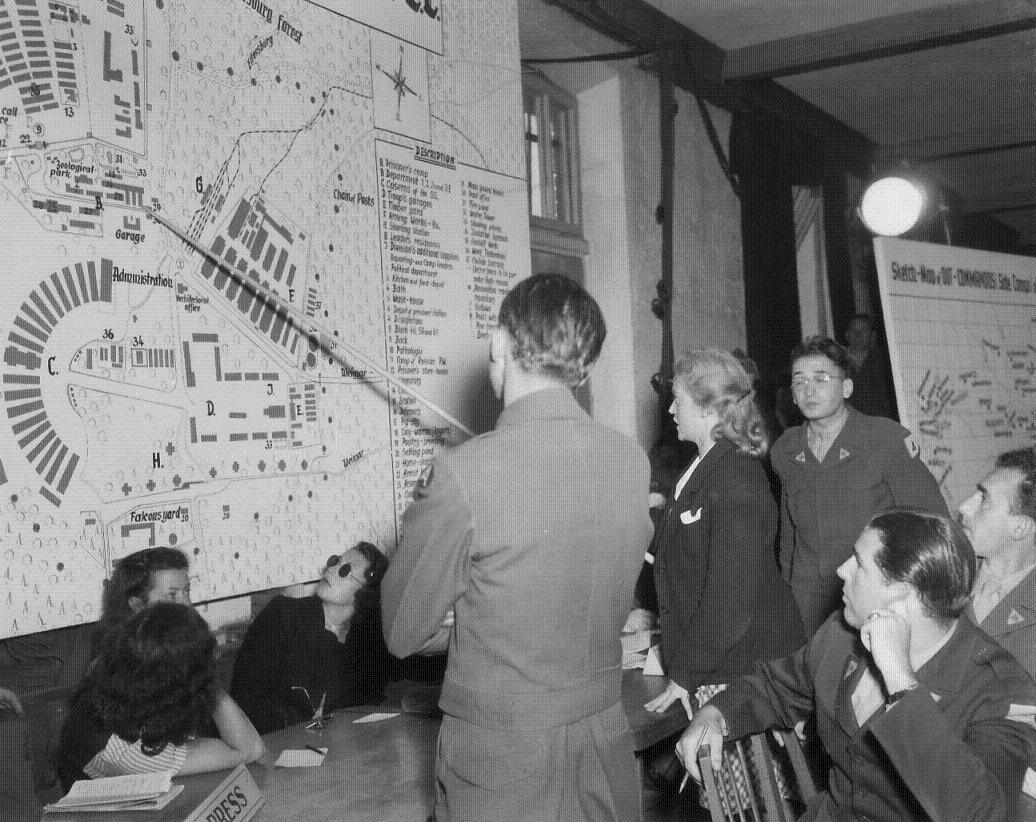
Ilse Koch at the U.S. Military Tribunal in Dachau, 1947

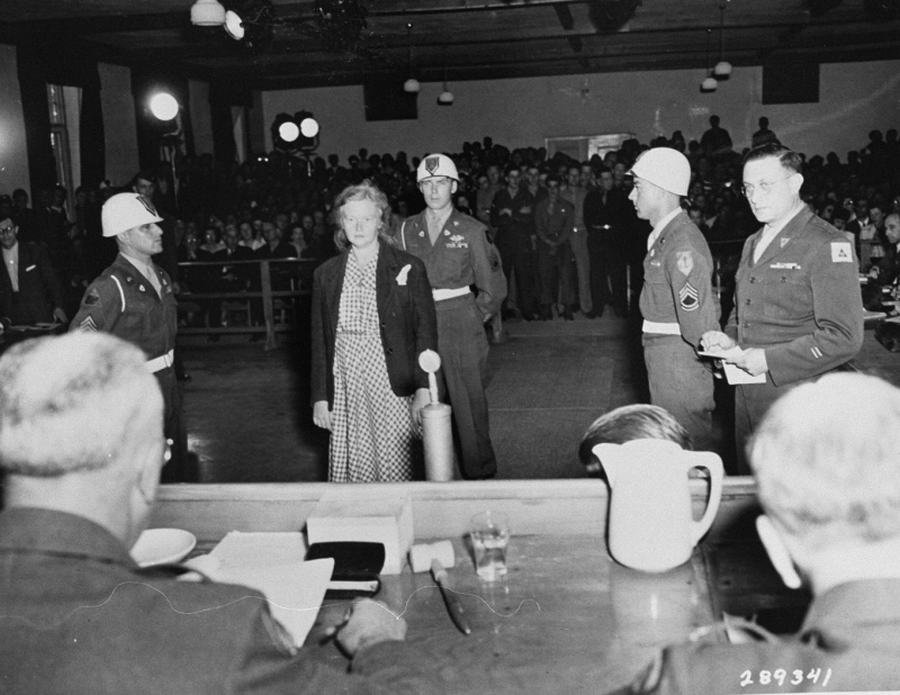
Koch being sentenced to life in prison on 14 August 1947

Following her arrest by American occupation authorities, Koch was chosen to stand trial alongside 30 other defendants accused of having committed war crimes at Buchenwald. The defendants would be tried by an American military court at Dachau in 1947 and be prosecuted by Lieutenant Colonel William Denson for the single charge of "participating in a common design to commit war crimes." According to this expansive charge, the prosecution was not required to show that Koch or any of her codefendants had committed any specific act of violence or atrocity, but only that they had in some fashion aided and abetted the functioning of the murderous criminal enterprise that was Buchenwald. Denson described her during the trial as "no woman in the usual sense but a creature from some other tortured world."

Like each of her codefendants at the Buchenwald trial, Ilse Koch was ultimately found guilty by the court on 14 August 1947; she was sentenced to life imprisonment. She avoided a probable death sentence since she was seven months pregnant with her fourth child at the time, by an unknown father.

== Sentence reduction and controversy ==
Following Koch's conviction at Dachau, her sentence was subjected to various levels of mandatory judicial review, before going to General Lucius D. Clay, the interim military governor of the American Zone in Germany, for final approval. First to review Koch's case were two lawyers in the office of the Deputy Judge Advocate for War Crimes, Harold Kuhn and Richard Schneider. They concluded that "in spite of the extravagant statements made in the newspapers, the record contains little convincing evidence against the accused ... In regard to the widely publicized charges that she ordered inmates killed for their tattooed skin, the record is especially silent." They found key testimony given against Koch to be "based on presumption and of doubtful veracity." Though Koch was shown to have beaten a few inmates, "no deaths or serious injuries are shown to have resulted." The War Crimes Review Board, a separate advisory body made up of military and civilian lawyers, conducted its own review, and similarly concluded that there was no reliable evidence that she had prisoners killed, "nor is there any evidence in this record of any kind that she at any time ever ordered any article made of human skin."

Upon receiving the reports of the War Crimes Review Board and his legal staff, and after reviewing the trial record himself, Judge Advocate Colonel J.L. Harbaugh noted, "I can't see anything on which we honestly can hold the accused. There is no question but that she was tried in the newspapers, and suffered both before and during her trial from her unique position as the only woman at the camp." Harbaugh labelled her sentence "excessive" and recommended that General Clay reduce her sentence to four years. Heeding the recommendations of the U.S. Army's judicial branch, Clay reduced the sentence on 8 June 1948, on the grounds that "there was no convincing evidence that she had selected inmates for extermination in order to secure tattooed skins, or that she possessed any articles made of human skin".

However, Clay also suggested that Koch could be tried under West German law: "I hold no sympathy for Ilse Koch. She was a woman of depraved character and ill repute. She had done many things reprehensible and punishable, undoubtedly, under German law. We were not trying her for those things. We were trying her as a war criminal on specific charges."

The reduction of Koch's sentence to four years resulted in an uproar when it was made public on 16 September 1948, but Clay stood firm by his decision. Years later, Clay stated:

There was absolutely no evidence in the trial transcript, other than she was a rather loathsome creature, that would support the death sentence. I suppose I received more abuse for that than for anything else I did in Germany. Some reporter had called her the "Bitch of Buchenwald", had written that she had lamp shades made of human skin in her house. And that was introduced in court, where it was absolutely proven that the lampshades were made out of goat skin. In addition to that, her crimes were primarily against the German people; they were not war crimes against American or Allied prisoners ... Later she was tried by a German court for her crimes and sentenced to life imprisonment. But they had clear jurisdiction. We did not.

News of Koch's sentence reduction created major controversy in the United States. Editorial pages in major newspapers asked whether the US Army had lost its capacity for sound judgment, while continuing to assert that Koch was a sexual deviant who had killed prisoners for their skins. The Miami Herald demanded to know "in the name of basic human justice and decency, what 'further' does the army need to slap Ilse into jail and keep her there?". The New York Post labeled the reduction of Koch's sentence "Clay's counter-atrocity" and described it as "almost beyond credence." Ed Sullivan, writing for the New York News, pondered whether "the Army reduced [Koch's] sentence ... so she could get back into the lampshade business."

Such protests in the press found their parallel on the streets of American cities. Rallies were organized by both veterans associations and the American Jewish Congress, while General Clay, who visited the United States in the midst of the controversy, was picketed by protesters, some of whom carried lampshades and demanded his removal from European command.

With pressure mounting from both the public and the press, a group of U.S. Senators resolved to investigate the circumstances of Koch's sentence reduction. The Senate investigation, led by Homer S. Ferguson, culminated in hearings at which major participants at Koch's Dachau trial were called to testify. Dachau trial chief prosecutor William Denson was particularly insistent that Koch's sentence reduction was unjust and that the witness testimony he drew upon was sufficient to secure her conviction and life sentence. Ultimately, the Senate investigation resulted in a recommendation that Koch be tried again – not by the U.S. Army, but by the newly independent West German judiciary. According to the committee's final report, in "being a woman" and in acting independently, Koch's perpetration of violence had been "more unnatural and more deliberate." It was, the report concluded, "highly important that Ilse Koch receive the just punishment she so justly deserves without further doing violence to long-established safe-guards of democratic justice".

== Trial at Augsburg ==
At the urging of the U.S. government, the West German judiciary put Koch on trial for crimes against German nationals, something over which the American military court at Dachau had not had jurisdiction. The U.S. government further instructed the military to give full assistance to West German investigators.

Koch was immediately re-arrested following her release from Landsberg prison in 1949. Bavarian chief prosecutor Johann Ilkow indicted Koch for twenty-five misdemeanor counts of grievous bodily harm, incitement to grievous bodily harm in a number of cases "no longer determinable", sixty-five counts of incitement to attempted murder, and twenty-five counts of incitement to murder. The hearing opened on 27 November 1950 before the District Court at Augsburg and lasted seven weeks, during which 250 witnesses were heard, including 50 for the defense. Koch herself said during the trial that "I never saw anything at Buchenwald which might have been against humanity... I was too busy raising my two children." Her mental health began to suffer considerably during the trial, leading to her collapse in court in late December 1950, and again in January 1951. At least four witnesses for the prosecution testified that they had seen Koch choose tattooed prisoners, who were then killed, or had seen or been involved in the process of making human-skin lampshades from tattooed skin. However, this charge was dropped by the prosecution when they could not prove lampshades or any other items were actually made from human skin.

On 15 January 1951, the court pronounced its verdict, in a 111-page-long decision, for which Koch was not present in court. It was concluded that the previous trials in 1944 and 1947 were not a bar to proceedings under the principle of ne bis in idem, as at the 1944 trial Koch had only been charged with receiving stolen goods, while in 1947 she had been accused of crimes against foreigners after 1 September 1939, and not with crimes against German nationals. She was ultimately convicted of seven misdemeanor counts of incitement to grievous bodily harm, one count of incitement to attempted murder, and one count of incitement to murder. On 15 January 1951, she was sentenced to life imprisonment and the permanent forfeiture of her civil rights. In its written judgment, the Augsburg court labeled Koch's crimes at Buchenwald particularly egregious because she "consciously suppressed any feeling of compassion and pity she had as a woman", and instead gave "free rein to her pursuit of power and prestige, her arrogance and her selfishness." The court noted in particular Koch's "stubborn and irresponsible denial" and incapacity for even the "slightest admission of guilt."

Koch appealed to have the judgment quashed, but the appeal was dismissed on 22 April 1952 by the Federal Court of Justice. She later made several petitions for a pardon, all of which were rejected by the Bavarian Ministry of Justice. Koch protested her life sentence, to no avail, to the International Human Rights Commission.

== Family ==
Ilse and Karl-Otto Koch had a son named Artwin (b. 1938 - d. 1964), and two daughters, Gisela (b. 1939 - d. 2018) and Gudrun (b. 1940 - d. 1941). Gudrun died of pneumonia at four months of age in February 1941; Artwin died by suicide in 1964; Gisela died in 2018. In addition, Ilse Koch conceived another child with a fellow German war crimes internee under murky circumstances while awaiting her trial at Dachau. Koch gave birth to a son she named Uwe Köhler while incarcerated at Landsberg prison in October 1947. The child was immediately handed over to Bavarian child welfare authorities. Uwe only discovered the identity of his mother as a teenager, and began to correspond with, and visit, his mother in 1966.

== Suicide ==
Koch hanged herself with a bed sheet at Aichach women's prison on 1 September 1967 at age 60. She experienced delusions and had become convinced that concentration camp survivors would abuse her in her cell. Her suicide note was written to her son Uwe: "There is no other way. Death for me is a release."

In 1971, Uwe sought posthumous rehabilitation for his mother. Via the press, he used clemency documents from her former lawyer in 1957 and his impression of her based on their relationship in an attempt to change people's attitude towards Koch.

== See also ==
- Female guards in Nazi concentration camps
- Irma Grese
- Aribert Heim
- Phil Lamason, the senior officer in charge of 168 allied airmen taken to Buchenwald
- Maria Mandl
- List of people who committed suicide by hanging

== Sources ==
- Jardim, Tomaz (2023). Ilse Koch on Trial: Making the 'Bitch of Buchenwald'. Cambridge, MA: Harvard University Press. ISBN 9780674249189.
- Massimiliano, Livi (2008). "Ilse Koch". In Pugliese, Elizabeth; Hufford, Larry (eds.). War Crimes and Trials: A Historical Encyclopedia, from 1850 to the Present. Santa Barbara: ABC-CLIO. ISBN 9781576078907.
- Gutman, Israel, ed. (1995). Encyclopedia of the Holocaust. Macmillan. pp. 809–810. ISBN 9780028645285.
- Lacqueur, Walter; Baumel, Judith Tydor, eds. (2001). The Holocaust Encyclopedia. Yale University Press. p. 97. ISBN 9780300084320.
- Shirer, William L. (1960). The Rise and Fall of the Third Reich. New York: Simon & Schuster. LCCN 60-6729.
- Sjoberg, Laura Elizabeth (2016). Women as Wartime Rapists: Beyond Sensation and Stereotyping. NYU Press. ISBN 9781786990303.
