= Anthony Van Bergen =

American politician (1786–1859)

Member of the New York State Assembly for Greene County
- In office January 1, 1835 – December 31, 1835 Serving with David Ingersoll
- Preceded by: Sylvester Nichols; Benedict Bagley
- Succeeded by: Luke Kiersted; Ambrose Baker

Personal details
- Born: Anthony Abraham Van Bergen; 1786 Catskill, New York
- Died: December 27, 1859 (aged 72–73) Coxsackie, New York
- Party: Democratic
- Spouse: Clarine Peck (m. 1806)
- Relations: Coenradt T. Houghtaling (uncle)
- Children: 10, including Anthony
- Parent(s): Peter A. Van Bergen; Hester Houghtaling Van Bergen
- Education: Union College

Anthony Abraham Van Bergen (1786 – December 27, 1859) was an American politician and judge from New York.

== Early life ==
Van Bergen was the only child of New York State Senator Peter A. Van Bergen and Hester (née Houghtaling) Van Bergen (1768–1824) and they lived in Catskill, New York. After his father's death in 1814, his mother remarried to Dr. James Oliver in 1811.

His paternal grandparents were Maria (née Salisbury) Van Bergen and Col. Anthony Van Bergen, a descendant of Mayor Dirck Wesselse Ten Broeck. His grandfather led the 11th Regiment of the Albany County militia (known as Van Bergen's Regiment) in the Revolutionary War. His maternal grandparents were Elizabeth (née Whitbeck) Houghtaling and Capt. Thomas Houghtaling, who fought in the second Battle of Saratoga under his paternal grandfather. His maternal uncle, Assemblyman Coenradt T. Houghtaling, was the wife of his paternal aunt, Catharina Van Bergen. and were the parents of one son:

He graduated from Union College, where he was a member of the Philomathean Society, with the class of 1808.

== Career ==
Van Bergen served as a judge of the Greene County Court. He also served as the first president of the New York State Agricultural Society upon its creation in 1832.

In 1834, he was elected as a Democrat to represent Greene County in the New York State Assembly. He served from January 1 to December 31, 1835 in the 58th New York State Legislature.

== Personal life ==
On April 19, 1806, Van Bergen was married to Clarine Peck (1785–1872), a daughter of John Peck of Lyme, Connecticut. Together, they lived at the Van Bergen homestead in New Baltimore, New York and were the parents of ten children, including:

- Elizabeth Van Bergen (1806–1822), who died unmarried of yellow fever.
- Lucy Ann Van Bergen (b. 1809), who married the Rev. Leonard Bronk Van Dyck (1806–1877), a son of Abraham Van Dyck and Catharine (née Bronck) Van Dyke.
- Peter A. Van Bergen (1812–1881), who married Lucy A. Smart (d. 1901), a daughter of William Smart and Elizabeth (née Franklin) Smart of Flushing, Queens, in 1849.
- Esther Van Bergen (1814–1875), who married Stephen J. Matson, a son of Israel Matson of Lyme, Connecticut.
- Rebecca Smith Van Bergen (1816–1888), who married Roswell Read Jr. (1814–1861), a son of Roswell Read, in 1838.
- Maria Van Bergen (1818–1879), who died unmarried.
- John Peck Van Bergen (1821–1908), who married Margaret Baker (1828–1893), a daughter of the Governor Joshua Baker of New Orleans and Fairfax Plantation in St. Mary Parish.
- James Oliver Van Bergen (1823–1891), who married Harriet Lay (d. 1883).
- Abraham Henry Van Bergen (1826–1826), who died in infancy.
- Anthony T. Van Bergen (1827–1912), who married Julia Augusta Pierson (1843–1897), a daughter of Charles Pierson of Arnold Constable & Co.; they moved to Paris, and he was made an Officer of the Legion of Honour.

Van Bergen died at Coxsackie on December 27, 1859.

=== Descendants ===
Through his youngest son Anthony, he was a grandfather of three, including Dr. Daniel Van Bergen, Harry Anthony Van Bergen (who lived at Attingham Park and married Ethel Irvin, a granddaughter of Richard Irvin), and Alice Van Bergen (1877–1960), who married Count Otto von Grote in 1900; their daughter, Van Bergen's great-granddaughter, Countess Antoinette Julia von Grote (1902–1988), was the wife of Prince Dietrich of Wied, a son of William Frederick, Prince of Wied and Princess Pauline of Württemberg (the elder daughter of William II of Württemberg). Van Bergen's great-great-grandson Prince Ulrich of Wied (1931–2010), was the father of Princess Marie of Wied (b. 1973), married Duke Friedrich of Württemberg (1961–2018), eldest son of Carl, Duke of Württemberg and heir to the House of Württemberg, in 1993.

== Sources ==
Political offices
Preceded by Sylvester Nichols; Benedict Bagley	Member of the New York State Assembly for Greene County; 1835–1835	Succeeded by Luke Kiersted; Ambrose Baker
