= Wittekind Fürst zu Waldeck und Pyrmont =

Head of House of Waldeck and Pyrmont
- Tenure: 30 November 1967 – 16 December 2024
- Predecessor: Josias, Hereditary Prince of Waldeck and Pyrmont
- Successor: Carl-Anton, Hereditary Prince of Waldeck and Pyrmont
- Born: 9 March 1936; Arolsen, Nazi Germany
- Died: 16 December 2024 (aged 88); Bad Arolsen, Germany
- Spouse: Countess Cecilie von Goëss-Saurau (m. 1988)
- Issue: Carl-Anton, Prince of Waldeck and Pyrmont; Prince Josias of Waldeck and Pyrmont; Prince Johannes of Waldeck and Pyrmont
Names
- Wittekind Adolf Heinrich Georg-Wilhelm
- House: Waldeck and Pyrmont
- Father: Josias, Hereditary Prince of Waldeck and Pyrmont
- Mother: Duchess Altburg of Oldenburg

Military service
- Allegiance: West Germany
- Rank: Oberstleutnant

Wittekind Adolf Heinrich Georg-Wilhelm Fürst zu Waldeck und Pyrmont (9 March 1936 – 16 December 2024) was a member of the former German nobility who from 1967 to 2024 was head of the House of Waldeck and Pyrmont. A life-long champion of the Waldeck region's cultural and environmental heritage, he served as president of the Hessian Forest Owners Association from 1978 to 1999.

== Biography ==
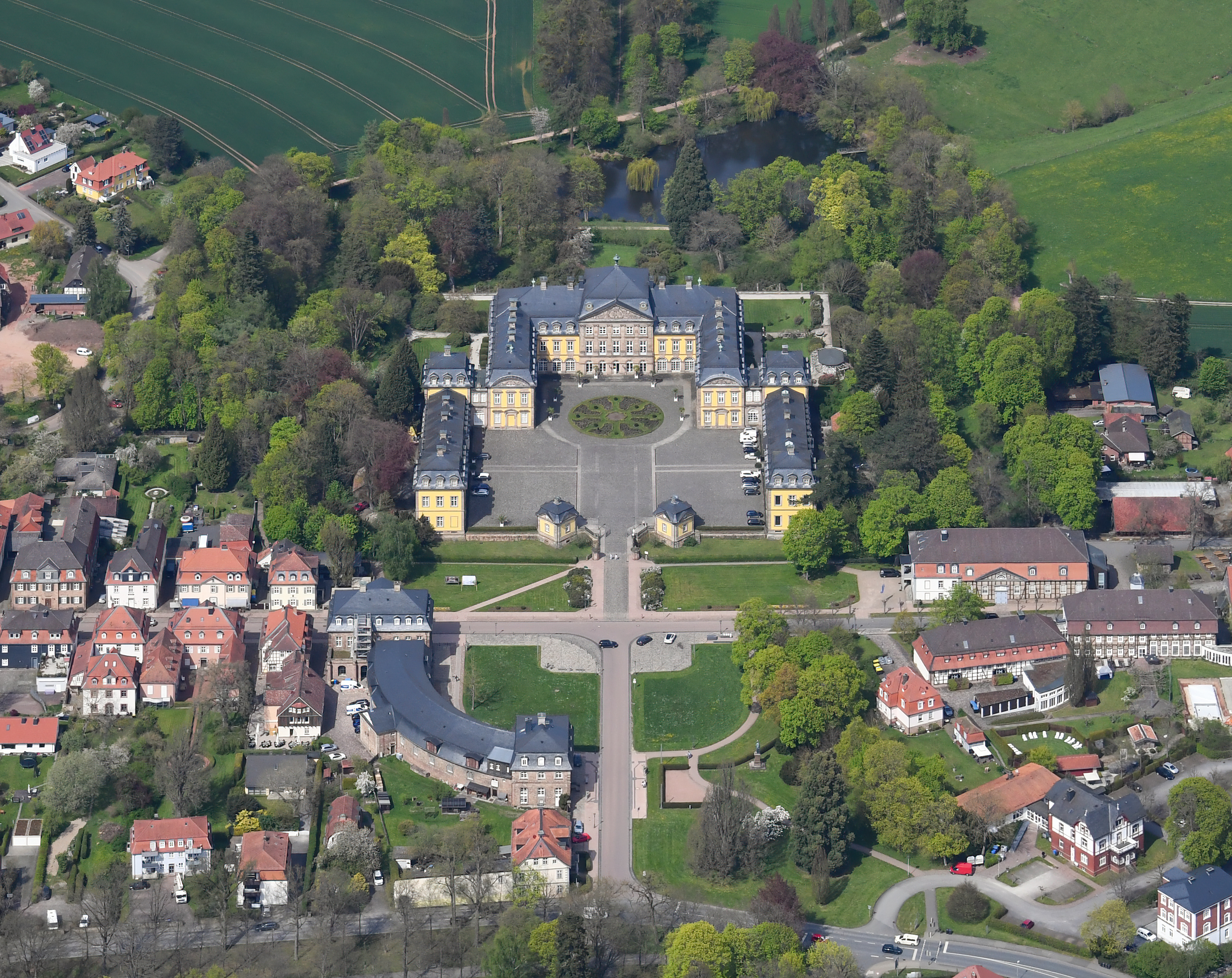
Arolsen Castle in Hesse, Germany, where Wittekind resided.

Born in Arolsen (now Bad Arolsen) in Hesse, Germany, Wittekind was the only son of Josias Georg Wilhelm Adolf, Hereditary Prince of Waldeck and Pyrmont (1896−1967), an SS officer later found guilty of war crimes, and Duchess Altburg Marie Mathilde von Oldenburg (1903–2001), daughter of Frederick Augustus II, Grand Duke of Oldenburg. His godfather was Heinrich Himmler. He was the great-nephew of Emma of Waldeck and Pyrmont (later Queen of the Netherlands and Grand Duchess of Luxembourg) and thus a second cousin of Queen Beatrix of the Netherlands, whom he welcomed to Arolsen Castle in both 2008, on the 150th anniversary of Queen Emma's birth, and 2016, to celebrate his own 80th birthday.

After studying business economics at Goethe University Frankfurt and the University of Cologne, he served in the German army, eventually holding the rank of lieutenant colonel.

Wittekind became head of the House of Waldeck and Pyrmont on his father's death in 1967. Until 2016 he was chair of the foundation that managed the estate, museum and library at Arolsen Castle, where he lived with his family. He worked to preserve the Hesse region's historical and architectural heritage and was president of the Hessian Forest Owners Association from 1978 to 1999, promoting the interests of private and communal forest owners at the regional and federal levels. He also inherited Schaumburg Castle, Rhineland-Palatinate, which he sold to an investment group in 1983.

Wittekind died in Bad Arolsen on 16 December 2024, at the age of 88. In a statement, the Minister-President of Hesse, Boris Rhein, paid tribute to Wittekind's achievements in promoting the region's cultural heritage.

== Marriage and family ==
On 19 May 1988, in Frohnleiten, Wittekind married Countess Cecilia von Goëss-Saurau (born 1956), with whom he had three sons, including Carl-Anton, who succeeded him as Prince of Waldeck and Pyrmont.

== Honours ==
On 9 August 2001, Wittekind was awarded the Federal Cross of Merit by Roland Koch, Minister-President of Hesse, in recognition of his decades of work with the Hessian Forest Owners Association. In 2011 he was also awarded the Georg-Ludwig-Hartig prize for his forestry work.

== Ancestors ==
Ancestors of Wittekind Fürst zu Waldeck und Pyrmont

8. George Victor, Prince of Waldeck and Pyrmont
4. Friedrich, Prince of Waldeck and Pyrmont
9. Princess Helena of Nassau
2. Josias, Hereditary Prince of Waldeck and Pyrmont
10. Prince William of Schaumburg-Lippe
5. Princess Bathildis of Schaumburg-Lippe
11. Princess Bathildis of Anhalt-Dessau
1. Wittekind, Prince of Waldeck and Pyrmont
12. Peter II, Grand Duke of Oldenburg
6. Frederick Augustus II, Grand Duke of Oldenburg
13. Princess Elisabeth of Saxe-Altenburg
3. Duchess Altburg of Oldenburg
14. Frederick Francis II, Grand Duke of Mecklenburg-Schwerin
7. Duchess Elisabeth Alexandrine of Mecklenburg-Schwerin
15. Princess Marie of Schwarzburg-Rudolstadt

== Notes ==
Wittekind Fürst zu Waldeck und Pyrmont House of Waldeck and Pyrmont Born: 9 March 1936 Died: 16 December 2024
Titles in pretence
Preceded by Hereditary Prince Josias	— TITULAR — Prince of Waldeck and Pyrmont; 30 November 1967 – 16 December 2024; Reason for succession failure: Monarchy abolished in 1918	Succeeded by Hereditary Prince Carl-Anton
