= Joshua Baker =

American politician

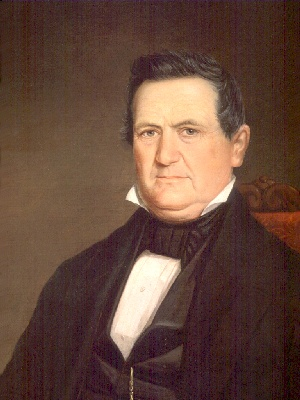

22nd Governor of Louisiana
- In office January 8, 1868 – June 27, 1868
- Lieutenant: Albert Voorhies
- Preceded by: Benjamin Flanders
- Succeeded by: Henry C. Warmoth

Personal details
- Born: March 23, 1799 Mason County, Kentucky
- Died: April 16, 1885 (aged 86) Lyme, Connecticut
- Party: Democratic
- Spouse(s): (1) Fanny Assherton (2) Catherine Patton
- Children: 5
- Education: United States Military Academy

Military service
- Allegiance: United States
- Branch/service: United States Army; Louisiana State Militia
- Years of service: 1819-1820 (Army); 1826-1861 (Militia)
- Rank: Second Lieutenant (Army); Colonel (Militia)

Joshua Gabriel Baker (March 23, 1799 – April 16, 1885) was a lawyer, engineer, and planter who served as the military governor of Louisiana during Reconstruction from January to July 1868. Baker opposed secession and remained loyal to The Union during the Civil War. He was appointed as military governor by General Winfield Scott Hancock, head of the Fifth Military District which included Louisiana and Texas.

== Early life ==
Joshua Baker was born March 23, 1799, in Mason County, Kentucky to Colonel Joshua G. Baker and Susan Lewis. In 1803, the Baker family moved to the Mississippi Territory where his father was a member of the Mississippi Territory's legislative council. In 1811, the family relocated to the vicinity of Bayou Teche, settling at Oaklawn Plantation in St. Mary Parish in the Territory of Orleans.

Baker attended the United States Military Academy from 1817 to 1819. Andrew Jackson Donelson was his roommate. After graduating, he was commissioned a Second Lieutenant in the Army Artillery Corps and served as an assistant professor at West Point before resigning in October 1820. In 1821, he moved to Litchfield, Connecticut to study law, and was admitted to the bar in Kentucky and Louisiana in 1822.

== Career ==
Baker moved back to Louisiana and remained active in public service in both St. Mary and Terrebonne Parishes. He served as a judge for St. Mary Parish from 1829 to 1832 and built the Parish courthouse in 1850. He served in state senate and was on the State Board of Public Works. In 1833, he was Assistant State Engineer for Louisiana until 1838. He was appointed Director of Public Works for the State of Louisiana 1840–1845.

From 1826 to 1829, Baker was a Colonel in the Louisiana State Militia. He was made Captain of Cavalry from 1846 until 1851 and in 1853 he was appointed to the Board of Visitors United States Military Academy, serving until 1861.

He worked on Engineering projects in Plaquemines Parish until 1829, when he was appointed Judge in St. Mary Parish; a position he held until 1839. Throughout this time, Baker owned three plantations: Black Bayou in Terrebonne Parish, Grand River in St. Martin Parish, and Fairfax Plantation in St. Mary Parish. He also was enthusiastic investor in steamboat properties.

=== Civil War and Governorship ===
Baker opposed Louisiana's succession from the Union and retired to his plantation in Franklin in 1861 after the outbreak of the Civil War. A Union Democrat, he chose to cooperate with the Union Army and was elected to Congress in November 1863 from Union occupied Louisiana but refused to travel to Washington D.C. to take his seat. On January 8, 1868, Baker took the Oath of Loyalty to the Union.

He was Appointed Military Governor by General Winfield Scott Hancock upon the resignation of Governor Benjamin Flanders. As Governor, Baker supported the lenient reconstruction plan of President Andrew Johnson. His administration had little influence on the course of the Louisiana government, as its orders were liable to be countermanded by the military due to the reconstruction acts. Baker sought to fix the state treasury which was virtually insolvent. With the state bankrupt, he authorized a directive to accrue all outstanding state fees, taxes, and revenues, which were to be used in the payment of state salaries and to supplement educational institutions and state programs.

Baker removed nine New Orleans City Councilmen which resulted in President Ulysses S. Grant's reversing his order, despite Hancock's support. For this, Governor Baker resigned and retired from public life. In a special election Republican Henry C. Warmoth was elected Governor to replace him.

== Personal life ==
In 1825, Baker married Fanny Assheton Stelle in Opelousas. Before her death on August 17, 1831, they were the parents of three children, including:

- Margaret Baker (1828–1893), who married John Peck Van Bergen, a brother of Anthony T. Van Bergen, a son of New York Assemblyman Anthony Van Bergen, and grandson of New York State Senator Peter A. Van Bergen.

He married a second time to Catherine Patton from Fairfax, Virginia in 1832. They had two children.

Baker died in Lyme, Connecticut, on April 16, 1885, at "Cricket Lawn" the home of his daughter Margaret Van Bergen. He was interred at Green-Wood Cemetery in Brooklyn, New York.

Political offices
Preceded by Benjamin Flanders	Governor of Louisiana; 1868	Succeeded by Henry C. Warmoth
