= Cecil Quentin =

British sailor

Personal information
- Nationality: British
- Born: 1852 Waterford, Ireland
- Died: 29 October 1926 (aged 73) Ramsgate, England

Sailing career
- Sport: Sailing
- Club: Royal Portsmouth Corinthian Yacht Club
- Class: 20+ ton
Medal record
Sailing
Representing Great Britain
Olympic Games
Gold medal – first place	1900 Paris	20+ ton

Cecil Quentin (1852 – 29 October 1926) was a British sailor who competed in the 1900 Summer Olympics in Le Havre, France. Quentin took the gold in the 20+ ton.

He was educated at Cheltenham College.
