= Coenradt T. Houghtaling =

American politician (1763–1836)

Member of the New York State Assembly for Greene County
- In office July 1, 1807 – June 30, 1808 Serving with Perez Steele
- Preceded by: Samuel Haight; James Thompson
- Succeeded by: James Gale; Eliakim Reed

Personal details
- Born: Coenradt Thomas Houghtaling; 1763 New Baltimore, New York
- Died: March 18, 1836 (aged 72–73)
- Spouse: Catharine Van Bergen
- Relations: Anthony Van Bergen (nephew)
- Parent(s): Thomas Houghtaling; Elizabeth Whitbeck Houghtaling

Coenradt Thomas Houghtaling (1763 – March 18, 1836) was an American politician.

== Early life ==
Houghtaling was born in New Baltimore, New York in 1763. He was a son of Capt. Thomas Houghtaling (1731–1824) and Elizabeth (née Whitbeck) Houghtaling. Among his siblings were brothers Hendrick Houghtaling (who married Elizabeth Staats), Andries "Andrew" Houghtaling (who married Polly N. Van Benthuysen) and sister, Hester Houghtaling, was the wife of Peter A. Van Bergen (the brother of his wife). His father fought in the second Battle of Saratoga under Lt.-Col. DuBois and Col. Anthony Van Bergen, who led the 11th Regiment of the Albany County militia in the Revolutionary War.

His paternal grandparents were Hendrick Houghtaling and Hester (née Bricker) Houghtaling. He was a descendant of Mathys Houghtaling, the original Houghtaling Patent holder.

== Career ==
In April 1807, Houghtaling was elected to represent Greene County in the New York State Assembly for the 31st New York State Legislature, serving from July 1, 1807 to June 30, 1808.

== Personal life ==
Houghtaling was married to Catharina "Catharine" Van Bergen (b. 1767), the sister of his wife's husband Peter, and a daughter of Col. Anthony Van Bergen and Maria (née Salisbury) Van Bergen. Through her grandmother, Christina (née Coster) Van Bergen, she was a descendant of Albany Mayor Dirck Wesselse Ten Broeck. Together, they were the parents of:

- Abraham Coenradt Houghtaling (1798–1841), who married Charlotte Bronk (1799–1891); their daughter Mary (b. 1831) was the wife of Martin Geritsen Van Slyke (b. 1829).

Houghtaling died on March 18, 1836.
