= Olivier, Baron de Brandois =

Olympic sailor

Personal information
- Full name: Marie Calixte Anne Olivier de Foucher de Brandois
- Born: 21 June 1870 Rilly-sur-Loire, Second French Empire
- Died: 6 June 1916 (aged 45) Pauillac, France

Sailing career
- Sport: Sailing
- Class: 20+ ton

Olivier, Baron de Brandois (21 June 1870 – 9 June 1916) was a French sailor who competed in the 1900 Summer Olympics in Le Havre, France. Baron de Brandois took the 4th place in the 20+ ton. He died of war-related illnesses contracted during World War I.
