= Edwin Katzen-Ellenbogen =

German-American eugenicist and Nazi collaborator (1882–1955)

Edwin Katzenellenbogen
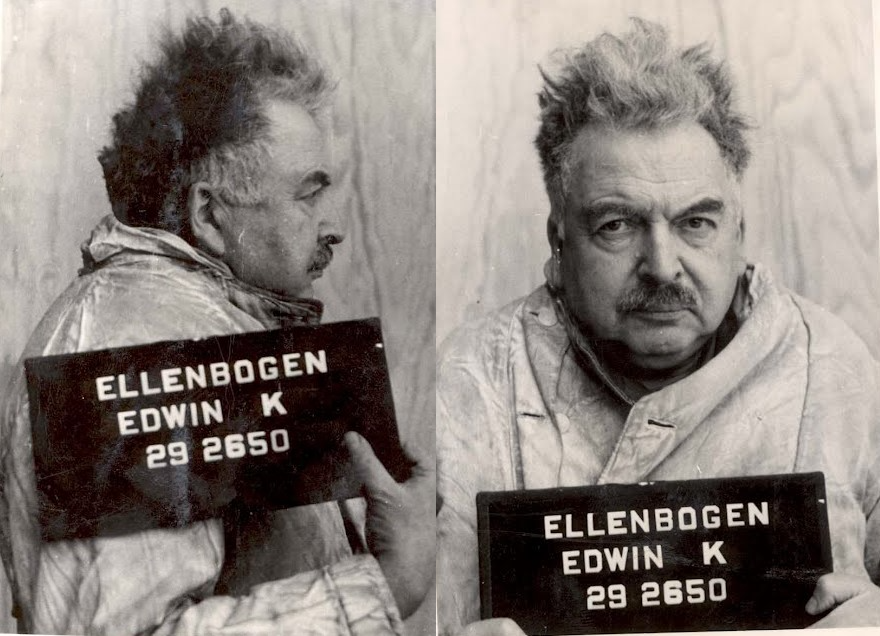
- Katzenellenbogen in U.S. custody (April 1947)
- Born: Edwin Maria Katzenellenbogen; May 22, 1882; Stanislau, Ivano-Frankivsk Oblast, Austria-Hungary
- Died: 1957
- Occupation: Psychiatrist
- Status: Deceased
- Conviction: War crimes
- Trial: Buchenwald trial
- Penalty: Life imprisonment; commuted 12 years imprisonment

Edwin Maria Katzenellenbogen, also spelled Katzen-Ellenbogen (22 May 1882 – after 1955) was an ethnically Jewish, German-American Nazi collaborator, eugenicist, and physician in the concentration camp of Buchenwald.

== Early life and education ==
Born in 1882 in Austrian Galicia, he attended a Polish-speaking Jesuit high school, and was a practicing Catholic. In 1905 he graduated as a doctor from Leipzig University.

== Career ==
He emigrated to the United States that same year, where he was naturalized a citizen. Katzenellenbogen worked as a eugenicist for the Carnegie Institution. At one point, he was a faculty member at Harvard Medical School. During this time, Katzenellenbogen married Aurelia Marie Pierce, the daughter of a Massachusetts Supreme Court Justice, whom he later divorced. He would be asked by then Governor of New Jersey, and later President of the United States, Woodrow Wilson, to draft a law for sterilising epileptics and those he considered as being so-called "defectives".

Katzenellenbogen returned to Europe in 1915 and moved between several countries on the continent. While in Holland, he was informed by telegram from the US that his only son had fallen from a roof and died. The shock affected his psyche for the rest of his life.

He and his new female partner were living in Germany during Hitler's ascension to power in the 1930s.

== Arrest and activity in Buchenwald ==
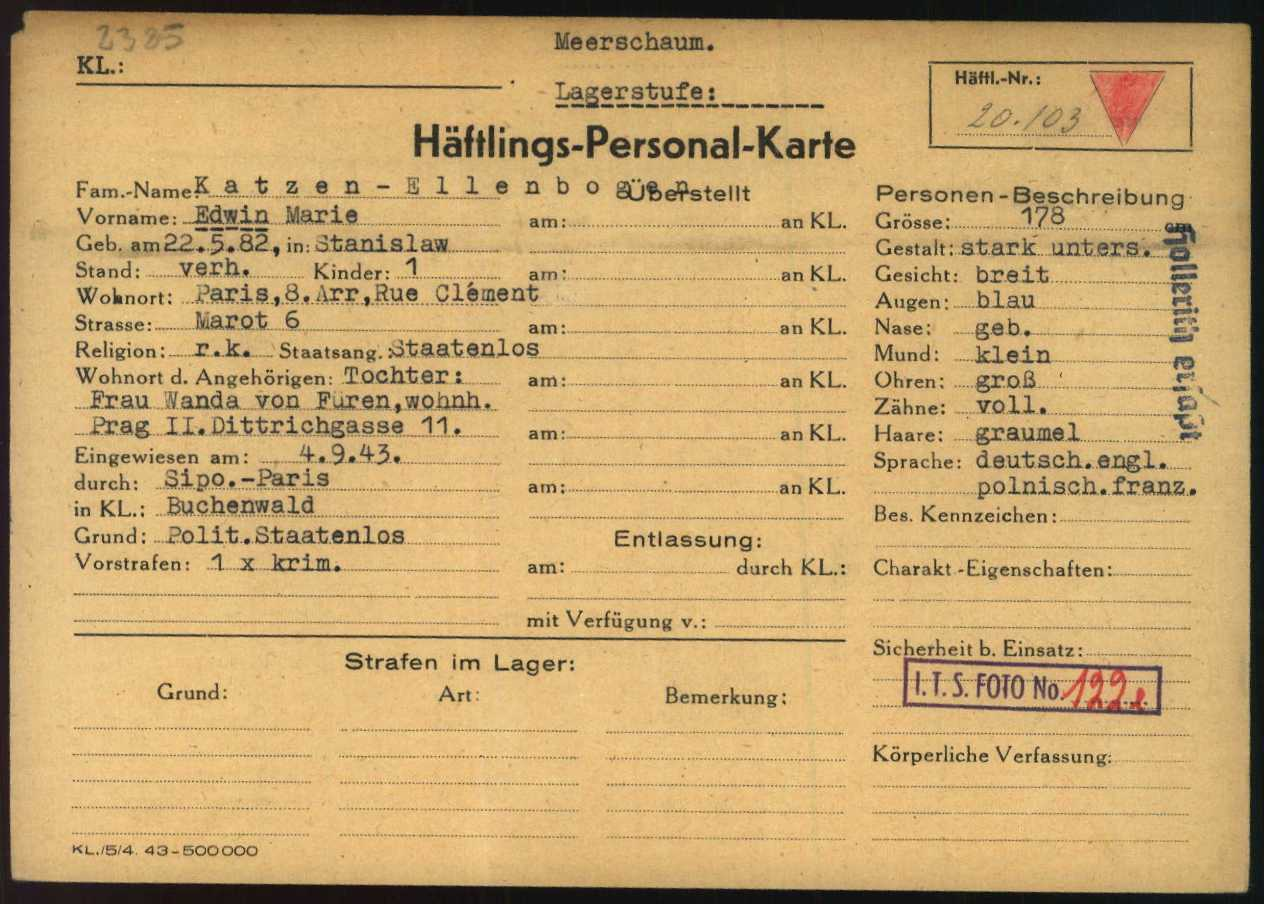
Registration card of Edwin Katzenellenbogen as a prisoner at Buchenwald Nazi concentration camp

He tried to escape arrest as a Jew under the 1935 Nuremberg laws by successively moving to Czechoslovakia, Italy, and after the start of the war in 1939, to France. Once that country was also partly occupied, he managed to gain a privileged position among Germans as a medical specialist with rare and much-needed professional and language skills. After several temporary arrests, he was first detained by the Gestapo in late summer of 1943, and then in September deported to Buchenwald concentration camp near Weimar in Germany. There he continued collaborating with the Nazis as a doctor, also conducting human experiments. He once again gained a position of privilege and even strong influence over the Nazi staff, while becoming infamous amongst prisoners for his cruelty, especially towards French communists.

== Trial and imprisonment ==
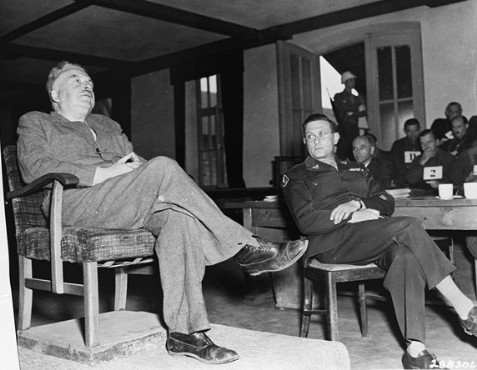
Katzenellenbogen testifies during his trial

In September 1945, Katzenellenbogen was arrested by the British occupation authorities in Marburg. In the Buchenwald Camp Trial (part of the Dachau Trials), he was charged along with 30 others. Katzenellenbogen was accused of mistreating prisoners and killing 1000 of them via lethal injection. After being found guilty, Katzenellenbogen requested a death sentence in a very twisted manner, by referring to himself in the third person and not actually admitting his guilt:

"You have placed the mark of Cain on my forehead. Any physician who committed the crimes I am charged with deserves to be killed. Therefore, I ask for only one grace. Apply to me the highest therapy that is in your hands."

On August 14, 1947, Katzenellenbogen was sentenced to life in prison. Given the fact that eyewitnesses of his alleged major crimes - murder by injection and human experiments, including on the inmates' eyes - were out of reach, being either back home or dead and cremated, military prosecutors failed to present conclusive evidence that he killed anyone. As a result, he was only found guilty of committing non-fatal abuse.

Katzenellenbogen's sentence was later commuted to 12 years, and he was already released from prison on September 26, 1953, eight years after his arrest by the British.

== Later years and death ==
Katzenellenbogen returned to the U.S. and resumed practice as a psychiatrist and psychoanalyst until at least the end of 1955. He died in 1957.
