= Peter A. Van Bergen =

American politician (1763–1804)

Member of the New York State Senate for the Middle District
- In office July 1, 1802 – August 30, 1804
- Preceded by: Peter Cantine Jr.
- Succeeded by: Peter C. Adams

Personal details
- Born: Peter Anthony Van Bergen; July 11, 1763
- Died: August 30, 1804 (aged 41)
- Party: Democratic-Republican
- Spouse: Hester Houghtaling (before 1804)
- Relations: Anthony T. Van Bergen (grandson)
- Children: Anthony Van Bergen
- Parent(s): Maria Salisbury; Anthony Van Bergen

Peter Anthony Van Bergen (July 11, 1763 – August 30, 1804) was an American politician and owner of a large amount of land from New York.

== Early life ==
Van Bergen was born on July 11, 1763. He was the second son of eight children born to Maria (née Salisbury) Van Bergen (b. 1739) and Col. Anthony Van Bergen (1729–1792), who led the 11th Regiment of the Albany County militia in the Revolutionary War.

His parents, who married in 1762, lived in Coxsackie, Greene County, New York. His elder brother was Abraham Van Bergen and his younger siblings were Myndert Van Bergen, Catharina Van Bergen (wife of Assemblyman Coenradt T. Houghtaling), Marten Gerritsen Van Bergen (who married Sally Conyn), Christina Van Bergen (wife of Arthur MacCloskey), Henry Coster Van Bergen and Rachel Van Bergen.

His paternal grandparents were Pieter van Bergen and Christina (née Coster) van Bergen (a daughter of Anthony Coster, niece of Johannes Cuyler, and granddaughter of Mayor Dirck Wesselse Ten Broeck). His maternal grandparents were Abraham Salisbury and Rachel (née Ten Broeck) Salisbury (a granddaughter of Wessel Wesselszen Ten Broeck, brother to Mayor Ten Broeck).

== Career ==
In April 1802, he was elected to a four-year term to replace Federalist Peter Cantine Jr. as a member of the New York State Senate, for the Middle District (consisted of Dutchess, Orange, Ulster, Columbia, Delaware, Rockland and Greene counties), alongside fellow Democratic-Republicans Jacobus S. Bruyn and James G. Graham. Van Bergen served in the 25th, 26th, and 27th New York State Legislatures until his death on August 30, 1804, before he was to serve in the 28th Legislature. He was succeeded by Peter C. Adams.

== Personal life ==
Van Bergen was married to Hester Houghtaling (1768–1824), the only daughter of Elizabeth (née Whitbeck) Houghtaling and Capt. Thomas Houghtaling, who fought in the second Battle of Saratoga under Van Bergen's father and Lt.-Col. DuBois. Hester's brother, Coenradt T. Houghtaling, was the husband of Peter's younger sister, Catharina. They lived in Catskill and were the parents of one son:

- Anthony Van Bergen (1786–1859), a judge of the county court, member of the New York State Legislature in 1835 and president of the New York State Agricultural Society who married Clarine Peck, a daughter of John Peck of Lyme, Connecticut.

Van Bergen died on August 30, 1804, aged 41. His widow remarried to Dr. James Oliver in 1811.

=== Descendants ===
Through his son Anthony, he was a grandfather of ten, including Anthony T. Van Bergen (who moved to Paris, was made an Officer of the Legion of Honour, and married Julia Pierson with whom he had three children, Charles, Henry and Alice Van Bergen).

Van Bergen's great-granddaughter, Alice Van Bergen (1877-1960), married Count Otto von Grote in 1900; their daughter, Van Bergen's great-great-granddaughter, Countess Antoinette Julia von Grote (1902–1988), was the wife of Prince Dietrich of Wied, a son of William Frederick, Prince of Wied and Princess Pauline of Württemberg (the elder daughter of William II of Württemberg). Van Bergen's great-great-great-grandson Prince Ulrich of Wied (1931–2010), was the father of Princess Marie of Wied (b. 1973), married Duke Friedrich of Württemberg (1961–2018), eldest son of Carl, Duke of Württemberg and heir to the House of Württemberg, in 1993.

== Sources ==
Political offices
Preceded by Peter Cantine Jr.	Member of the New York State Senate for the Middle District; 1802–1804	Succeeded by Peter C. Adams
