= Selwyn Calverley =

British sailor

John Selwyn Calverley
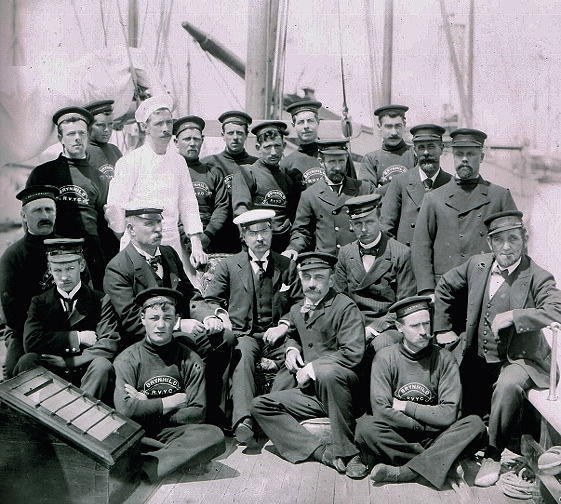
- John Selwin Calverley, seated in the centre, with the crew of his racing yacht Brynhild which was built in 1899

Personal information
- Full name: John Selwyn Calverley
- Nationality: British
- Born: 4 July 1855 Leeds, England
- Died: 30 December 1900 (aged 45) Leeds, England

Sailing career
- Sport: Sailing
- Class: 20+ ton
Medal record
Sailing
Representing Great Britain
Olympic Games
Silver medal – second place	1900 Paris	20+ ton

John Selwyn Calverley (middle name sometimes spelled Selwin; 4 July 1855 – 30 December 1900) was a British sailor who competed in the 1900 Summer Olympics in Le Havre, France. Calverley took the silver in the 20+ ton.

Calverley was born in Leeds, a member of the Calverley family of Oulton Hall. His father was Edmund Calverley and his mother, Isabella, was the daughter of Sir John Thomas Selwyn, 6th baronet Selwyn (or Selwin) and sister of the Conservative politician Henry Selwin-Ibbetson, 1st Baron Rookwood. In 1888 he married Sybil Disraeli, a niece of British prime minister Benjamin Disraeli, and they had two daughters:

1. Sybil Horatia Calverley (1889–1971)
2. Frances Mary Calverley (1896–1970)
