= Groß Plasten =

- Municipality
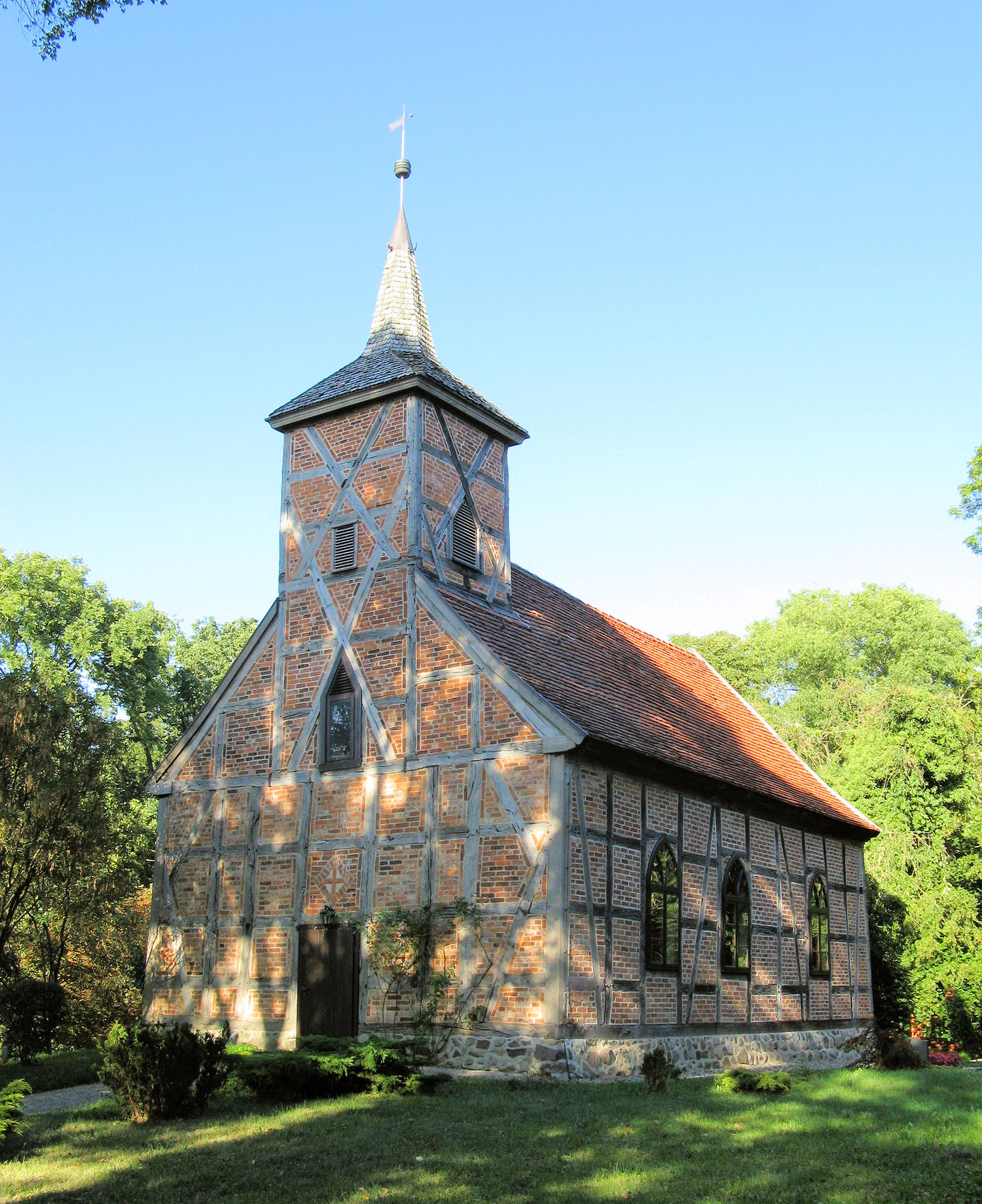
- Church in Klein Plasten

- Location of Groß Plasten within Mecklenburgische Seenplatte district
- Interactive map of Groß Plasten
- Location within Germany Location within Mecklenburg-Vorpommern
- Coordinates: 53°32′48″N 12°50′48″E
- Country: Germany
- State: Mecklenburg-Vorpommern
- District: Mecklenburgische Seenplatte
- Municipal assoc.: Seenlandschaft Waren

Government
  - Mayor: Rene Petzke

Area
  - Total: 34.77 km^{2} (13.42 sq mi)
- Elevation: 58 m (190 ft)

Population (2025-12-31)
  - Total: 1,031
  - Density: 29.65/km^{2} (76.80/sq mi)
- Time zone: UTC+01:00 (CET)
  - Summer (DST): UTC+02:00 (CEST)
- Postal codes: 17192
- Dialling codes: 039934
- Vehicle registration: MÜR
- Website: www.amt-slw.de

Groß Plasten is a municipality in the Mecklenburgische Seenplatte district, in Mecklenburg-Vorpommern, Germany. The former municipality Varchentin was merged into Groß Plasten in May 2019.
