= Josias, Hereditary Prince of Waldeck and Pyrmont =

German politician, Higher SS and Police Leader, SS-Obergruppenführer

Josias Erbprinz zu Waldeck und Pyrmont
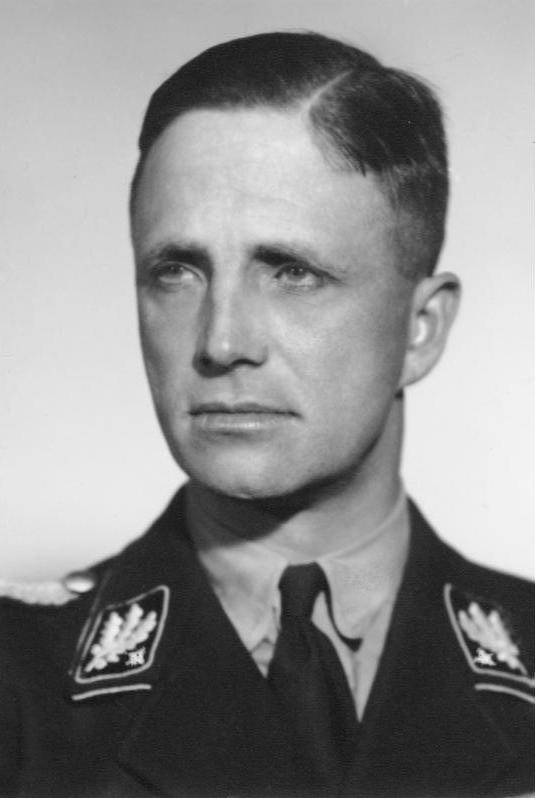
- Josias c. 1936–42
- Born: 13 May 1896; Arolsen, Principality of Waldeck-Pyrmont, German Empire
- Died: 30 November 1967 (aged 71); Schloss Schaumburg, near Diez an der Lahn, West Germany
- Military career
- Allegiance: German Empire; Weimar Republic; Nazi Germany
- Service years: 1914–1945
- Rank: SS-Obergruppenführer
- Commands: HSSPF Fulda-Werra; SS-Oberabschnitt Fulda-Werra
- Conflicts: World War I World War II
- Awards: Eisernes Kreuz I Clasp to the Iron Cross 1st Class, Wound Badge in Black 1918, German Cross in Gold, War Merit Cross 2nd Class With Swords.

Prince Josias
- Hereditary Prince of Waldeck and Pyrmont

Head of the House of Waldeck and Pyrmont
- Tenure: 26 May 1946 – 30 November 1967
- Predecessor: Friedrich
- Successor: Wittekind
- Spouse: Duchess Altburg of Oldenburg (m. 1922)
- Issue: Countess Margarethe of Erbach-Erbach; Princess Alexandra of Bentheim and Steinfurt; Princess Ingrid; Wittekind, Prince of Waldeck and Pyrmont; Guda, Princess of Wied
- House: Waldeck and Pyrmont
- Father: Friedrich, Prince of Waldeck and Pyrmont
- Mother: Princess Bathildis of Schaumburg-Lippe

Josias, Hereditary Prince of Waldeck and Pyrmont (German: Josias Georg Wilhelm Adolf Erbprinz zu Waldeck und Pyrmont) (13 May 1896 – 30 November 1967) was the heir apparent to the throne of the Principality of Waldeck and Pyrmont and a general in the Schutzstaffel (SS). From 1946 until his death, he was the head of the Princely House of Waldeck and Pyrmont. After World War II, he was sentenced to life in prison at the Buchenwald Trial (later commuted to 20 years) for his part in the "common plan" to violate the Laws and Usages of War in connection with prisoners of war held at Buchenwald concentration camp, but was released after serving about three years in prison.

== Early years ==
He was born in Arolsen at the ruling family's castle, the eldest son and heir of Prince Friedrich of Waldeck and Pyrmont and his consort Princess Bathildis of Schaumburg-Lippe. He was the nephew of William II, King of Württemberg, and Emma of Waldeck and Pyrmont, Queen Regent of the Netherlands. He was also a cousin of Wilhelmina, Queen of the Netherlands, and Charles Edward, Duke of Saxe-Coburg and Gotha. He enlisted in the German Army as a cadet and fought in the First World War, where he suffered serious injuries. At the end of the war, his family lost their Principality as Waldeck and Pyrmont became a Free State in the new Weimar Republic, due to the German Revolution.

== SS career ==
After the war, Waldeck-Pyrmont studied agriculture. On 1 November 1929, he joined Adolf Hitler's Nazi Party, becoming a member of the Schutzstaffel (SS) on 2 March 1930. He was immediately appointed adjutant to Sepp Dietrich, before becoming Reichsführer-SS Heinrich Himmler's adjutant and staff chief in September 1930.

Waldeck-Pyrmont was elected to the Reichstag in March 1933 on the electoral list of the Nazi Party. At the November 1933 election, he was returned as a deputy for electoral constituency 23, (Düsseldorf West) and retained this seat until the final days of the Nazi regime. Also in 1933, he was promoted to the rank of SS lieutenant general. He was appointed in 1938 to the post of Higher SS and Police Leader for Weimar. In this position he had supervisory authority over Buchenwald concentration camp.

Buchenwald had first caught the attention of Waldeck in 1941 when, glancing over the camp's death list, he came across the name of Walter Krämer, a head hospital orderly at Buchenwald. He recognized it because Krämer had successfully treated him in the past. Waldeck investigated the case and discovered Karl-Otto Koch, the camp's commandant, had ordered both Krämer and Karl Peix (a hospital attendant) killed as "political prisoners" because they had treated him for syphilis, a fact Koch wished to keep secret. Waldeck also received reports that a certain prisoner had been shot while attempting to escape. By that time, Koch had been transferred to the Majdanek concentration camp in Poland, but his wife, Ilse, was still living at the Commandant's house in Buchenwald. Waldeck ordered a full-scale investigation of the camp by Georg Konrad Morgen, an SS major who was a judge in a German court. Throughout the investigation, more of Koch's orders to kill prisoners at the camp were revealed, as well as evidence of embezzlement of property stolen from prisoners. It was also discovered that the prisoner who was "shot while trying to escape" had been told to get water from a well some distance from the camp, then was shot from behind; he had also helped treat Koch for syphilis. A charge of incitement to murder was lodged against Koch by Waldeck-Pyrmont and Morgen, to which later was added a charge of embezzlement. Other camp officials were also charged, including Ilse Koch. The trial resulted in a death sentence for the Commandant, who was executed by firing squad on 5 April 1945. Morgen was convinced that Ilse Koch was guilty of sadistic crimes, but could not prove the charges against her; she was detained by German authorities until early 1945.

Adolf Hitler appointed Waldeck-Pyrmont a member of the Ordnungspolizei (uniformed police) in April 1941 and, a year later, he was appointed High Commissioner of Police in German-occupied France. One of his first acts in his new role was ordering French hostages to be placed on German troop trains, to discourage sabotage attempts on them. He was made a general in the Waffen-SS in July 1944.

== Arrest and later life ==
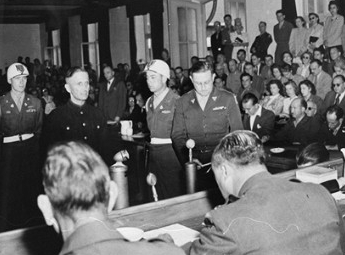
Waldeck-Pyrmont during the Buchenwald Trial

Waldeck-Pyrmont was arrested on 13 April 1945, and sentenced to life imprisonment by an American court at Dachau during the Buchenwald Trial on 14 August 1947. He was convicted of war crimes against Allied prisoners and civilians at Buchenwald, on the grounds that he held command authority over the camp, and that through receiving regular reports and repeated inspection visits, he was aware of events occurring there. Military Governor of Germany, General Lucius D. Clay ordered that the sentences of the Buchenwald Trial be re-examined on the basis of extensive records and, on 8 June 1948, confirmed fifteen of the death sentences and commuted seven. Most of the imprisonment sentences were also commuted, including Waldeck-Pyrmont's (from life to twenty years). Waldeck-Pyrmont was taken to Landsberg am Lech, where he served only three years of his sentence before being released in December 1950 for health reasons. He was granted an amnesty by the Minister President of Hesse in July 1953, which resulted in a significant reduction of the fine imposed on him.

== Head of the House of Waldeck and Pyrmont ==
Coat of Arms of the Princely House of Waldeck and Pyrmont

Waldeck-Pyrmont became head of the House of Waldeck and Pyrmont upon the death of his father, on 26 May 1946, while under house arrest. He died at his primary estate, Schloss Schaumburg, in 1967, and was succeeded as head of the house by his only son Prince Wittekind.

== Family ==
Waldeck-Pyrmont married Duchess Altburg of Oldenburg, a daughter of the former Grand Duke of Oldenburg, Friedrich August II, on 25 August 1922 at Rastede. They had five children:

- Princess Margarethe of Waldeck and Pyrmont (22 May 1923 – 21 August 2003); her son Count Eberhard of Erbach-Erbach would marry Princess Alexandra Reuss, granddaughter of Princess Marie Adelheid of Lippe
- Princess Alexandra of Waldeck and Pyrmont (25 September 1924 – 4 September 2009)
- Princess Ingrid of Waldeck and Pyrmont (b. 2 September 1931)
- Prince Wittekind of Waldeck and Pyrmont (9 March 1936 – 16 December 2024)
- Princess Guda of Waldeck and Pyrmont (b. 22 August 1939), married Friedrich Wilhelm, Prince of Wied (her second cousin twice-removed), grandson of William Frederick, Prince of Wied.

== Ancestry ==
Ancestors of Josias, Hereditary Prince of Waldeck and Pyrmont

8. George II, Prince of Waldeck and Pyrmont
4. George Victor, Prince of Waldeck and Pyrmont
9. Princess Emma of Anhalt-Bernburg-Schaumburg-Hoym
2. Friedrich, Prince of Waldeck and Pyrmont
10. William, Duke of Nassau
5. Princess Helena of Nassau
11. Princess Pauline of Württemberg
1. Josias, Hereditary Prince of Waldeck and Pyrmont
12. George William, Prince of Schaumburg-Lippe
6. Prince William of Schaumburg-Lippe
13. Princess Ida of Waldeck and Pyrmont
3. Princess Bathildis of Schaumburg-Lippe
14. Prince Frederick Augustus of Anhalt-Dessau
7. Princess Bathildis of Anhalt-Dessau
15. Princess Marie Luise Charlotte of Hesse-Kassel

== See also ==
- List of SS-Obergruppenführers

== Sources ==
- Petropoulos, Jonathan (2006). Royals and the Reich: The Princes Von Hessen in Nazi Germany. Oxford University Press. ISBN 0-19-516133-5.
- Hackett, David A. (1997). The Buchenwald Report. Westview Press. ISBN 0-8133-3363-6.
- Stein, Harry (2004). Buchenwald concentration camp 1937–1945. Wallstein Verlag. ISBN 3-89244-695-4.

Josias, Hereditary Prince of Waldeck and Pyrmont House of Waldeck and Pyrmont Cadet branch of the House of Waldeck Born: 13 May 1896 Died: 30 November 1967
Titles in pretence
Preceded by Friedrich	— TITULAR — Prince of Waldeck and Pyrmont; 26 May 1946 – 30 November 1967; Reason for succession failure: Monarchy abolished in 1918	Succeeded by Wittekind
