= Buchenwald trial =

War crime trial

Coordinates: 48.2703°N 11.4681°E

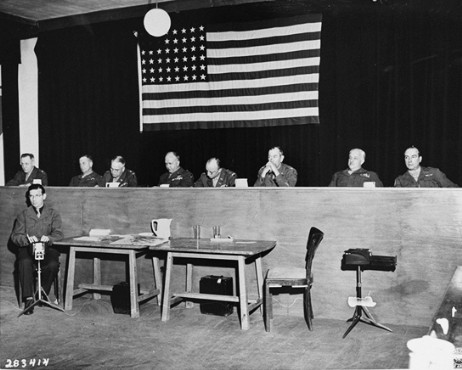
The eight American officers of the U.S. military tribunal at the trial of former camp personnel and prisoners from Buchenwald. From left to right: Lt. Col. Morris, Col. Robertson, Col. Ackerman, Brig. Gen. Kiel, Lt. Col. Dwinell, Col. Pierce, Col. Dunning, and Lt. Col. Walker.

The Buchenwald trial or United States of America vs. Josias Prince of Waldeck et al. (also referred as Case 000-50-9) was a war crime trial conducted by the United States Army as a court-martial in Dachau, then part of the American occupation zone. It took place from April 11 to August 14, 1947 in the internment camp of Dachau, where the former Dachau concentration camp had been located until late April 1945. In this trial, 31 people were indicted for war crimes related to the Buchenwald concentration camp and its satellite camps, all of whom were convicted. The Buchenwald trial was part of the Dachau trials, which were held between 1945 and 1948.

== Background ==
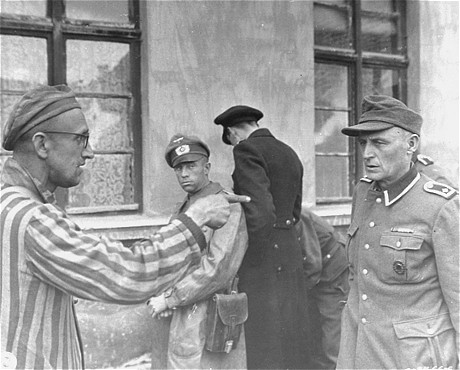
A SS guard who allegedly abused prisoners was identified on 14 April 1945 by a former Soviet Buchenwald prisoner at Buchenwald.

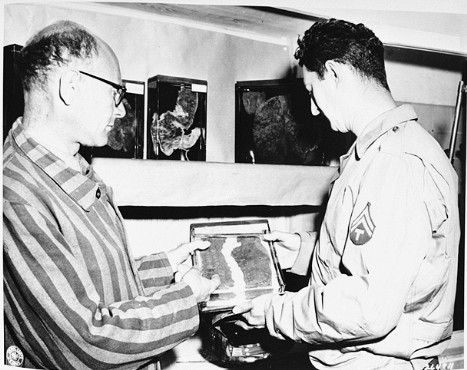
On 27 May 1945, a former Buchenwald inmate shows American soldier Jack Levine a container with human organs that Nazi physicians removed from camp inmates.

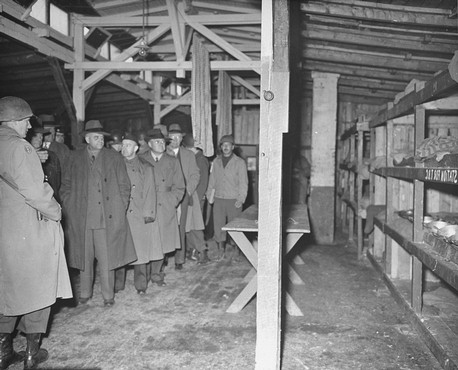
American congressmen visited Buchenwald on 24 April 1945.

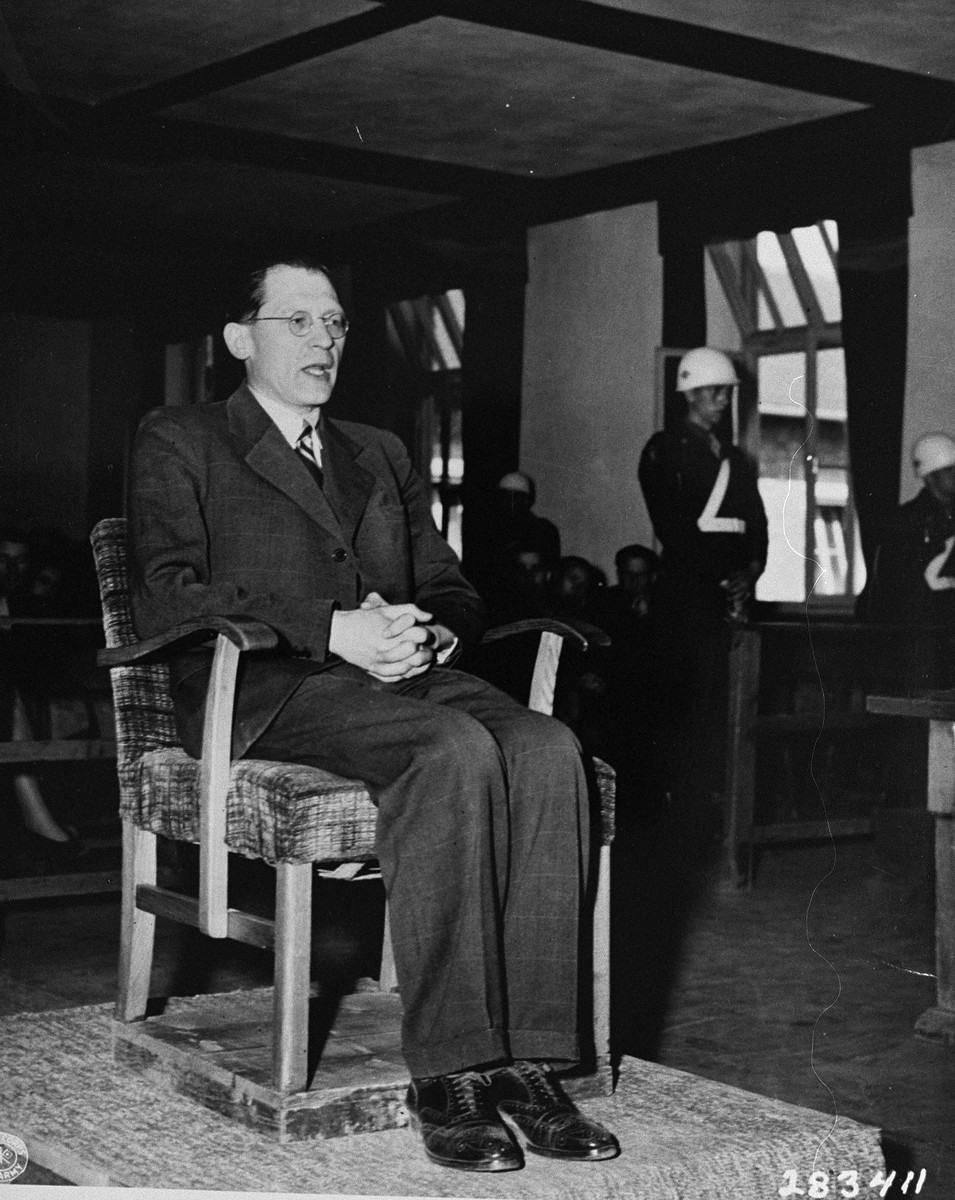
German historian and camp survivor Eugen Kogon giving his eyewitness testimony on 16 April 1947 at the Buchenwald trial.

The pigs in the SS stables received better feed, compared to the food of the prisoners

— Peter Zenkl, former Buchenwald inmate, Testimony in the Buchenwald Trial from mid April 1947.

When American troops reached the concentration camps of the German Reich in the final stages of World War II, they were unprepared, partly because they were in the middle of combat, to face and trail the atrocities in the concentration camps. The care of mostly emaciated and very sick "Muselmänner" and the burial on the death marches of thousands of prisoners who perished from starvation or shooting presented a difficult task for the United States Army. Before the liberation of the Buchenwald concentration camp on 11 April 1945, the American soldiers had taken photographs after the capture of the Ohrdruf concentration camp, a subcamp of Buchenwald, that illustrate the horrific circumstances of the camp evacuation. As early as 12 April 1945 the Supreme Commander of the Allied forces, Dwight D. Eisenhower, visited the Ohrdruf concentration camp and, because of the terrible camp conditions, he asked for U.S. and British politicians, representatives of the United Nations and the U.S. press to view the camp. On 16 April 1945, 1000 people from Weimar under American command were mandated to visit Buchenwald concentration camp where they could witness the remaining traces of the mass extinction. Elsewhere nearby residents had to bury the victims from the evacuation marches.

In this context, as part of the U.S. War Crimes Trial Program, a U.S. program for the instauration of legal standards and a judicial system to prosecute German war crimes, American investigators began promptly with inquiries to identify those responsible for these crimes. The perpetrators were soon caught and detained, including the last commandant of Buchenwald concentration camp Hermann Pister, who was arrested in June 1945 by American soldiers in Munich. The Command staff was interned in a prisoner-of-war camp at Bad Aibling and was interrogated shortly after the war ended in 1945 by the Counterintelligence Corps. At least 450 former Buchenwald inmates were called as witnesses, including Hermann Brill, and two truckloads of documentary material from the camp commander was used as evidence. Because of the London EAC Protocols, on 1 July 1945 the American military in Thuringia handed it over to the Soviet Military Administration in Germany (SMAD). After preliminary investigations against more than 6000 people until the fall of 1945, about 250 suspects were detained. However, witnesses were often no longer available to identify or incriminating photographs were not properly assigned; and some suspects managed to flee.

Since the Soviet Union had the most victims (about 15,000) in Buchenwald compared to the other nations involved, presumably other suspects were staying in the Soviet occupation zone or were there in custody, the American military government in Germany (OMGUS) considered to leave the Soviet Union in charge of the judicial process. On 9 November 1945, the deputy military governor Lucius D. Clay submitted a proposal to the leader of the Soviet Military Administration in Germany, Vasily Sokolovsky, to transfer the Buchenwald trial to the Soviet government. After lengthy negotiations and hesitant inspection of the investigation files, the Soviet side expressed interest in the proceeding only with respect to the mass killing in Gardelegen, where 1000 prisoners were burned alive. After the handover of the investigation of the 22 accused to the Soviet military authorities, it was agreed to perform the same procedure for the defendants in the Buchenwald concentration camp and Mittelbau-Dora, a former Buchenwald central warehouse and from October 1944 an independent concentration camp. 3 September 1946 was stipulated as the date for the transfer of the detainees and the extensive evidence concerning Buchenwald and Mittelbau; however, no representatives of the Soviet military administration appeared at the meeting point at the border zone. After 14 hours of waiting, the prisoners and the evidence were taken back to the detention center at Dachau. The Soviets may not have accepted the offer because they used the concentration camp after the takeover as "Special Camp 2" and may have feared future accusations of war crimes themselves.

Private negotiations regarding the competence of the Buchenwald proceedings arose because of the significant delayed international criticism. In particular, the United Nations War Crimes Commission, a Commission of Allied states to prosecute war crimes committed by the Axis powers, demanded already at the beginning of 1946 the implementation of the Buchenwald trial before an international court. After the Soviet military authorities showed no interest, French and Belgian judicial authorities announced their desire to carry out the trial. This option was rejected by the American side having regard to the immense work of translation that should have been done. The lead investigator in the U.S. Army forced then the beginning of the process. By the end of December 1946 the preparation for the process was completed.

== Prosecution and legal bases ==
Most of the indicted had been members of the camp staff, but also SS and Police Leader Josias, Hereditary Prince of Waldeck and Pyrmont was indicted, because Buchenwald concentration camp was in his jurisdiction. The camp commander, Hermann Pister, and members of the command staff, as well as the widow of the first commander, Ilse Koch, were indicted. Also, three of the camp doctors and senior SS medical officers had to stand trial. Finally, even block leaders, detachment commanders, three prisoner functionaries and a civilian employee stood trial.

The legal basis of the process was the "Legal and Penal Administration" from March 1947, based on the decrees of the Military Government. The Control Council Law No. 10 of 20 December 1945, according to which any person who have been indicted for war crimes, crimes against peace and crimes against humanity could be convicted, played no significant role in this process.

Defendant	Photograph	Rank	Function	Sentence
Josias, Hereditary Prince of Waldeck and Pyrmont		SS-Obergruppenführer	SS and Police Leader	Life imprisonment, later commuted to 20 years; released 1950
Hermann Pister		SS-Oberführer	Camp commandant	Death; died September 1948 before the sentence could be carried out
Hans-Theodor Schmidt		SS-Hauptsturmführer	Adjutant to Hermann Pister	Death; executed 7 June 1951
Ilse Koch		SS-Oberaufseherin	Wife of the first camp commandant Karl Koch	Life imprisonment, commuted to four years imprisonment, then re-instated at retrial; committed suicide while serving her sentence
Hermann Hackmann		SS-Hauptsturmführer	Head of protective custody	Death, commuted to life imprisonment, then 25 years; released 1955
Wolfgang Otto		SS-Sturmscharführer	Head of the Kommandanturschreibstube	20 years imprisonment, commuted to 10 years; released 6 March 1952
Hermann Grossmann		SS-Obersturmführer	Manager of Buchenwald's satellite camps	Death; executed 19 November 1948
Max Schobert		SS-Sturmbannführer	Schutzhaftlagerführer	Death; executed 19 November 1948
Hans Merbach		SS-Obersturmführer	Schutzhaftlagerführer	Death; executed 14 January 1949
Hans Eisele		SS-Hauptsturmführer	Camp physician	Death, commuted to 10 years imprisonment; released 26 February 1952
August Bender		SS-Sturmbannführer	Camp physician	10 years imprisonment, commuted to three years; released June 1948
Werner Greunuss		SS-Untersturmführer	Physician in subcamp Ohrdruf	Life imprisonment, commuted to 20 years; may have escaped 1949
Friedrich Karl Wilhelm		SS-Untersturmführer	Sanitätswesen	Death; executed 26 November 1948
Otto Barnewald		SS-Sturmbannführer	Administrative director	Death, commuted to life imprisonment; released 28 June 1954
Philipp Grimm		SS-Obersturmführer	Labor overseer	Death, commuted to life imprisonment; released 12 February 1954
Albert Fredrich Schwartz		SS-Hauptsturmführer	Labor overseer	Death, commuted to life imprisonment; released 14 May 1954
Franz Zinecker		SS-Obersturmführer	Labor overseer	Life imprisonment
Richard Köhler		SS-Unterscharführer	Kommando leader	Death; executed 26 November 1948
Josef Kestel		SS-Hauptscharführer	Kommando leader	Death; executed 19 November 1948
Hubert Krautwurst		SS-Hauptscharführer	Kommando leader	Death; executed 26 November 1948
Gustav Heigel		SS-Hauptscharführer	Kommando leader and head of the arrest blocks	Death, commuted to life imprisonment; released 1957
Anton Bergmeier		SS-Oberscharführer	Detention supervisor	Death, commuted to life imprisonment; released mid-1950s
Hermann Helbig		SS-Hauptscharführer	Crematorium Kommando leader	Death; executed 19 November 1948
Emil Pleissner		SS-Hauptscharführer	Crematorium Kommando leader	Death; executed 26 November 1948
Guido Reimer		SS-Obersturmführer	Commander of the SS-Sturmbanns	Death, commuted to life imprisonment; released 16 December 1952
Helmut Roscher		SS-Oberscharführer	Rapportführer	Death, commuted to life imprisonment; released mid-1950s
Arthur Dietzsch		Kapo	Prisoner nurse in Block 46	15 years imprisonment; overturned 1950
Hans Wolf (Kapo concentration camp)		Kapo	Camp elder in the Tröglitz subcamp	Death; executed 19 November 1948
Edwin Katzenellenbogen		Kapo	Prisoner doctor	Life imprisonment, commuted to 15 years; released 1953
Peter Merker		SS-Oberscharführer	Kommandoführer in Gustloff-Werk II	Death, commuted to 20 years
Walter Wendt		SA-Sturmführer	Civilian personnel manager	15 years imprisonment, commuted to five years

== Bibliography ==
- Buchenwald-Hauptprozess: Deputy Judge Advocate’s Office 7708 War Crimes Group European Command APO 407. (United States of America v. Josias Prince zu Waldeck et al. – Case 000-50-9). Review and Recommendations of the Deputy Judge Advocate for War Crimes, November 1947 (PDF)
- Ludwig Eiber, Robert Sigl (Hrsg.): Dachauer Prozesse –NS-Verbrechen vor amerikanischen Militärgerichten in Dachau 1945–1948. Göttingen: Wallstein, 2007, ISBN 978-3-8353-0167-2
- Manfred Overesch: Buchenwald und die DDR – oder die Suche nach Selbstlegitimation. Vandenhoeck & Ruprecht, 1995, ISBN 978-3-525-01356-4.
- Katrin Greiser: Entsetzen der Befreier: Das US-War Crimes Program.In: Die Todesmärsche von Buchenwald. Räumung des Lagerkomplexes im Frühjahr 1945 und Spuren der Erinnerung. Göttingen: Wallstein, 2008, ISBN 978-3-8353-0353-9, S. 370–450.
- Ute Stiepani: Die Dachauer Prozesse und ihre Bedeutung im Rahmen der alliierten Strafverfolgung von NS-Verbrechen. In: Gerd R. Ueberschär: Die alliierten Prozesse gegen Kriegsverbrecher und Soldaten 1943–1952. Frankfurt: Fischer, 1999, ISBN 3-596-13589-3.
- Robert Sigel: Im Interesse der Gerechtigkeit. Die Dachauer Kriegsverbrecherprozesse 1945–48. Frankfurt: Campus, 1992, ISBN 3-593-34641-9.
- Wolfgang Benz, Barbara Distel, Angelika Königseder: Der Ort des Terrors: Geschichte der nationalsozialistischen Konzentrationslager. Vol. 3: Sachsenhausen und Buchenwald. Munich: Beck, 2006, ISBN 3-406-52963-1.
