= Sailing at the 1900 Summer Olympics – 20+ ton =

Sailing at the Olympics

20+ ton Sailing at the Games of the II Olympiad
- 20+ Ton Class
- Venue: Le Havre
- Date: 2 August 1900
- Competitors: 14 (documented) from 4 nations
- Teams: 14

Medalists
1st place, gold medalist(s)		Cécil Quentin	Great Britain
2nd place, silver medalist(s)		John Selwin Calverley	Great Britain
3rd place, bronze medalist(s)		Harry Van Bergen	United States

The 20+ ton was a sailing event on the Sailing at the 1900 Summer Olympics program in Le Havre. The race was planned for 2 August 1900. However, as result of the storm that was unleashed on the port and the poor condition of the sea the race was postponed to Sunday 3 August 1900. 14 boats, from 4 nations registered for the competition. Due to the weather conditions only four of them started and finished the race. Originally this race was not a part of the Olympic competition but was part of the l’Exposition universelle. Later it was incorporated in the Olympic history.

== Race schedule ==
●	Meulan competition	●	Le Havre competition

1900	May								August					
1900	20 Sun	21 Mon	22 Tue	23 Wed	24 Thu	25 Fri	26 Sat	27 Thu	1 Fri	2 Sat	3 Sun	4 Mon	5 Tue	6 Wed
20+ ton											●			
Total gold medals											1			

== Course area and course configuration ==
For the 20+ ton the 40 nautical miles (74 km) course off the coast of Le Havre was used.

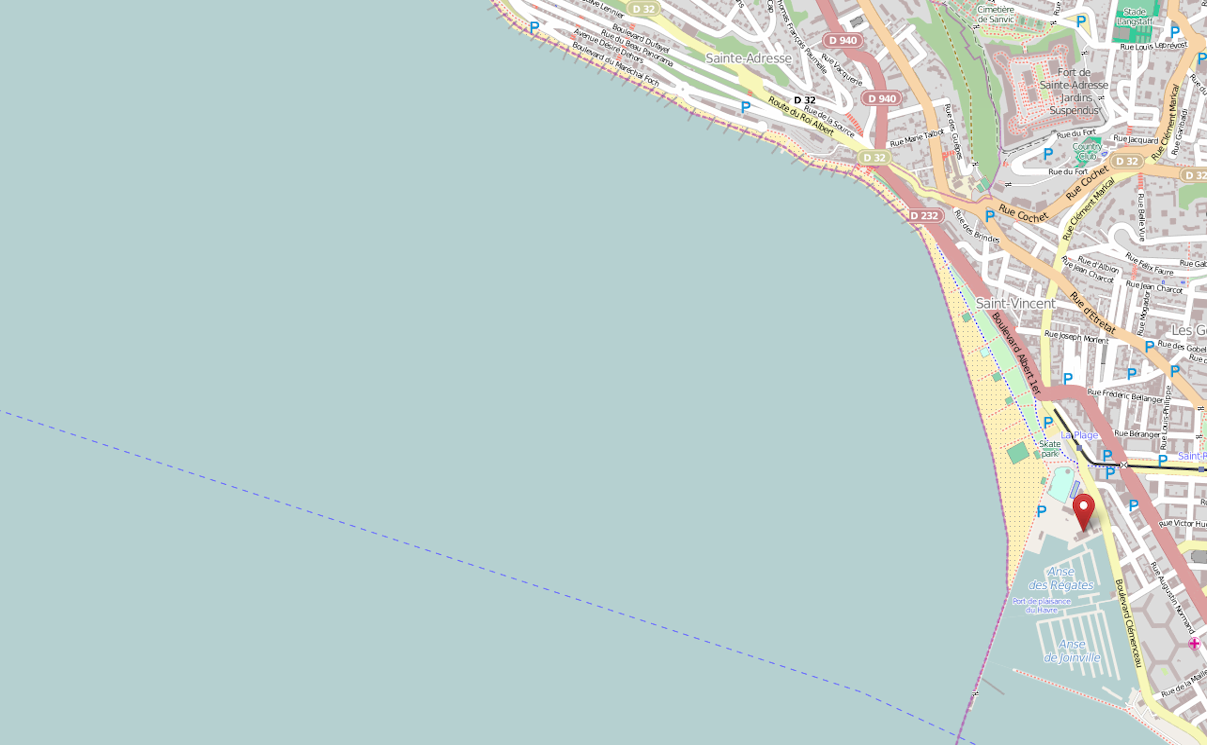
Course area Le Havre

== Weather conditions ==
Date	Race	Description	Sea	Wind direction	Remark
03-AUG-1900	1	Very strong breeze	Heavy seas		

== Final results ==
The 1900 Olympic scoring system was used. Handicaps were added to each boat's actual time to give a total adjusted time.

Rank	Country	Helmsman	Boat	Race	
Rank	Country	Helmsman	Boat	Pos.	Pts.
1st place, gold medalist(s)	Great Britain	Cecil Quentin	Cicely	6:01:06 (T)	5:29:46 (C)
2nd place, silver medalist(s)	Great Britain	John Selwin Calverley	Brynhild	5:30:06 (T)	5:30:06 (C)
3rd place, bronze medalist(s)	United States	Harry Van Bergen	Formosa	6:21:32 (T)	5:32:52 (C)
4	France	Olivier, Baron de Brandois	Souvenance	7:18:58 (T)	6:20:58 (C)
	Great Britain	Byles	Caress	DNS	
	Germany	Max Guillaume	Clara	DNS	
	Great Britain	Fynn	Colombine	DNS	
	Great Britain	Rait	Fiona	DNS	
	Great Britain	Aubry Harcourt	Héloise	DNS	
	Great Britain	Kermedy	Maid-Marion	DNS	
	France	Piton	Miriam	DNS	
	Great Britain	Payet	Namara	DNS	
	Great Britain	Fulcher	Roseneath	DNS	
	Great Britain	James	Zullanar	DNS	

Legend: DNS – Did not start;
Gender: – male; – female;

== Notes ==
In the second round, Formosa, which was ahead of its competitors, had its spinnaker gone in a burst, which was significant set back.

== Other information ==
The races drew a considerable number of spectators and yachts to watch the races in Le Havre. The harbour was packed with different tonnage vessels. Offshore the Fleurus, Cassini, and Mangini destroyers were present. Most of the members of the international jury followed the races aboard the Almee, a yacht owned by Henri Menier.

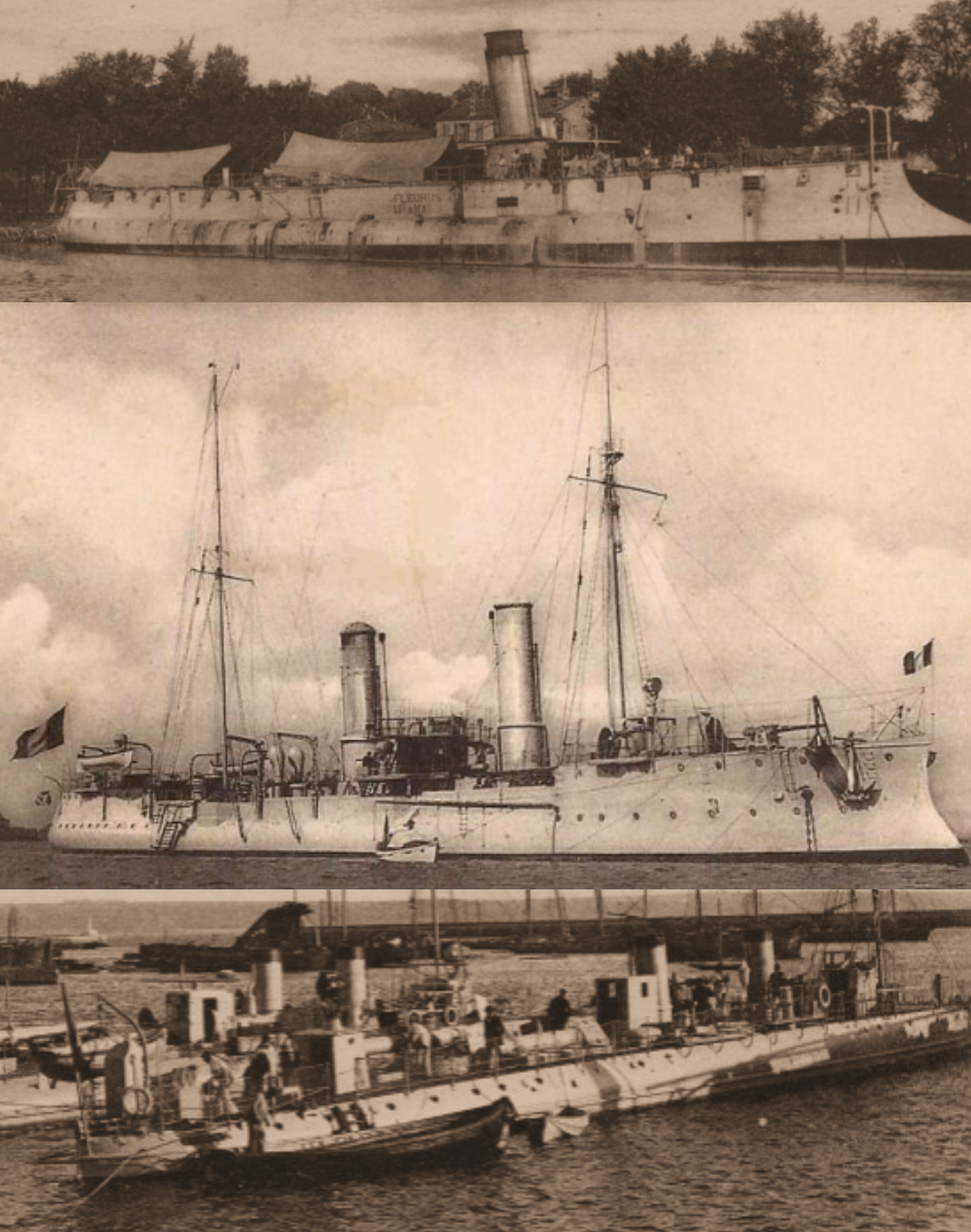
These three French destroyers were present during the sailing of the 1900 Summer Olympics off the coast of Le Havre (FRA).
