= William Denson =

Chief Prosecutor in Nazi concentration camps trials

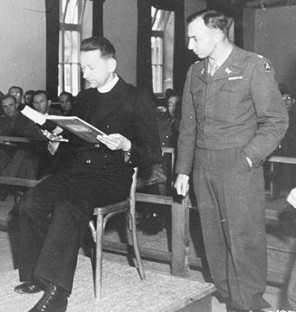
William Denson (right) at the trial of war criminals from Dachau concentration camp

William Denson (May 31, 1913 – December 13, 1998) was an American lawyer and military prosecutor who served as Chief Prosecutor in the trials of war criminals of Nazi concentration camps.

Denson was born on May 31, 1913, in Birmingham, Alabama. He was the grandson of William Henry Denson, a prominent local lawyer and politician. He attended United States Military Academy at West Point, graduating in 1934. He resigned from the army the same year to attend Harvard Law School, from which he graduated in 1937. In 1942, he returned to the army to teach law at West Point. In January 1945, he was transferred to the United States Army Central in Munich, Germany, as a judge advocate, where he was assigned to lead the investigation and prosecution of war crimes committed at Nazi concentration camps.

Denson served as Chief Prosecutor at trials for the concentration camps at Dachau, Mauthausen, Flossenbürg and Buchenwald. During this time, he led the prosecution of 177 people and secured convictions of 174, of whom 132 were sentenced to death. Denson was instrumental in deciding not to prosecute the camp staff for crimes against humanity as was happening in the concurrent Nuremberg trials, but rather under existing German law, specifically Germany's obligations as signatories to the Hague Conventions and first and third Geneva Conventions. He reasoned that the evidence for war crimes committed by camp staff against Allied prisoners of war was more than sufficient to secure convictions and that concentrating on this would minimize the risks of convictions being overturned on appeal.

After the trials concluded in 1947, Denson returned to the United States, where he entered private practice as chief of litigation for the newly created Atomic Energy Commission. In 1950, he represented the Commission in the trials of Julius and Ethel Rosenberg. In 1952, he moved to New York City, where he transitioned into patent law. From 1966 to 1976, he was mayor of Lawrence, New York. In 1950, Denson married Constance von Francken-Sierstorpff, whom he had met during his time in Germany.
