= Erich Wagner =

SS-Sturmbannführer and camp doctor (1912–1959)

- Born: 15 September 1912; Komotau, Austria-Hungary
- Died: 23 March 1959 (aged 46); Oberkirch, Baden-Württemberg, West Germany
- Cause of death: Suicide
- Status: Deceased
- Military career
- Allegiance: Nazi Germany
- Branch: Waffen-SS
- Rank: SS-Sturmbannführer
- Commands: Buchenwald concentration camp (1941–1945)

Erich Wagner (15 September 1912 – 22 March 1959) was a German-Austrian SS-Sturmbannführer and camp doctor in the Buchenwald concentration camp.

== Life ==
Wagner was born on 15 September 1912 in Komotau, Austria-Hungary (now Chomutov, Czech Republic). After completing his school career, Wagner studied medicine at the University of Graz and Innsbruck, among others, and completed his studies in December 1938 with the state examination. Even before Austria's annexation to the German Reich in March 1938, he was involved with the NSDAP and SS, which were banned in Austria. Wagner then attended an SS Junkers school and received his license to practice medicine. In November 1939, Wagner was employed as a camp doctor in the Buchenwald concentration camp, where he worked until January 1941.

From the fall of 1940 onwards, SS-Hauptsturmführer Müller worked in pathology, [...] Müller worked with the camp doctor Dr. Wagner, who wrote a doctoral thesis about tattoos. Both searched the entire camp for tattooed people and had them photographed. The prisoners were then called to the gate by Commander Koch, selected based on the splendor of their tattooed skin and sent to the infirmary. Soon afterwards, the best skin specimens appeared in the 'Department of Pathology', where they were prepared and shown to SS visitors for years as special treasures.

Eugen Kogon – The SS state: The system of the German concentration camps – Kindler, Reinbek near Hamburg 1974, p. 161f

In June 1940, his thesis, A Contribution to the Tattoo Question was accepted by Friedrich Timm, who had been head of the Institute for Forensic Medicine and Scientific Criminology at the University of Jena since 1938 . At the end of November 1940, Wagner submitted his dissertation, which was later rated “very good”. Wagner graduated with a medical doctorate in September 1941. For this study, 800 tattooed Buchenwald prisoners were examined according to reasons for imprisonment, origin, motivation for tattooing and type of tattoo. In particular, connections between “tattoos and criminality” should be researched. The work was probably mainly written by the Buchenwald prisoner Paul Grünewald and was only accompanied by Wagner. However, the University of Jena was not aware of this.

The prisoner Gustav Wegerer, a Viennese chemical engineer and Kapo in the pathology department of the Buchenwald concentration camp, later said the following: “The SS doctor Dr. Wagner did a dissertation on tattoos, and it was noticeable that the prisoners he ordered died and their tattoos were removed. It can be assumed that he liquidated them in the hospital.”

After his deployment in Buchenwald, Wagner was probably employed as a troop doctor in Waffen-SS formations. At the end of the war, Wagner was taken prisoner by the Americans, from which he was able to escape in 1948. He lived undetected in Bavaria for six years under a pseudonym. From 1957 he practiced in his wife's medical practice in Lahr/Black Forest until he was arrested in 1958. Wagner was ultimately charged by the Offenburg regional court for his crimes committed in Buchenwald and committed suicide while in custody in Oberkirch prison in March 1959.
