= Princess Pauline of Württemberg (1877–1965) =

Pauline of Württemberg
- Princess of Wied
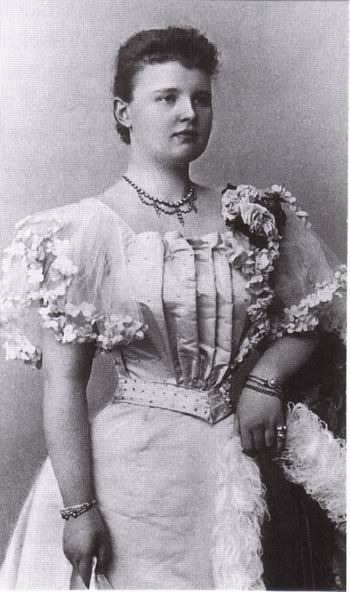
- Born: 19 December 1877; Stuttgart, Kingdom of Württemberg
- Died: 7 May 1965 (aged 87); Ludwigsburg, West Germany
- Spouse: William Frederick, Prince of Wied (m. 1898; died 1945)
- Issue Detail: Hermann, Hereditary Prince of Wied; Prince Dietrich
Names
- Pauline Olga Helene Emma
- House: Württemberg
- Father: William II of Württemberg
- Mother: Princess Marie of Waldeck and Pyrmont

Princess Pauline Olga Helene Emma of Württemberg (19 December 1877 – 7 May 1965) was the only child of William II of Württemberg and Princess Marie of Waldeck and Pyrmont to reach adulthood. Pauline was the wife of William Frederick, Prince of Wied, and worked for many years as the regional director of the German Red Cross in western Germany.

== Early life ==
Pauline was born at Stuttgart in the Kingdom of Württemberg, the elder daughter of William II of Württemberg by his first wife, Princess Marie of Waldeck and Pyrmont. She became their only surviving child after the deaths of her brother Prince Ulrich and unnamed stillborn sister.

== World War II ==
She was indicted for concealing, since October 1945, a pair of important Nazis by a military court of the United States. She confessed to knowingly sheltering Gertrud Scholtz-Klink and her spouse, former SS Maj. General August Heissmeyer. The Princess was aware that Scholtz-Klink was the head of the Nazi women's organizations, but she denied that she had been aware of Heissmayer's SS position.

Princess Pauline was bailed out of custody but scheduled for trial in March 1948. She stated that she came to know Scholtz-Klink during the years when both women headed significant institutions under the Nazis, the Princess asserting that she had then been the director of the German Red Cross for Hesse, Nassau, the Rhineland and Westphalia.

Heissmeyer and Scholtz-Klink informed the French that they asked for Princess Pauline's aid in 1945; Princess Pauline arranged for them to stay inconspicuously in Bebenhausen, where they were arrested by Allied authorities.

== Marriage and family ==
Princess Pauline married on 29 October 1898 in Stuttgart to William Frederick, Prince of Wied (1872–1945), son of William, Prince of Wied and the spectacularly wealthy Princess Marie of the Netherlands. Her husband's elder brother was William, Prince of Albania, and she was a first cousin of the Dutch queen, Wilhelmina of the Netherlands.

They had 2 children:

- Hermann, Hereditary Prince of Wied (18 August 1899 – 5 November 1941), married Countess Marie Antonia von Stolberg-Wernigerode, and had issue, including Friedrich Wilhelm, Prince of Wied, who married Princess Guda of Waldeck und Pyrmont, daughter of Josias, Hereditary Prince of Waldeck and Pyrmont.
- Prince Dietrich of Wied (30 October 1901 – 8 June 1976), married Countess Antoinette Julia von Grote, and had issue. The Countess was a niece of Countess Thyra von Grote, who married German diplomat Martin Rücker von Jenisch, in 1905. She was also a niece of American expatriate Harry Van Bergen and a granddaughter of businessman Anthony T. Van Bergen.

=== Descendants ===
Through Prince Dietrich, she was a grandmother of Prince Maximilian (1929–2008), Prince Ulrich (1931–2010) and Prince Ludwig-Eugen (1938–2001). Her grandson Prince Ulrich married Ilke Fischer and they were the parents of Prince Ulrich (b. 1970), who married Clarissa Elizabeth Makepeace-Massingham (b. 1971); and Princess Marie (b. 1973), who married Friedrich, Hereditary Duke of Württemberg (1961–2018), eldest son of Carl, Duke of Württemberg and heir to the House of Württemberg. Hereditary Duke Friedrich died in a car accident in 2018. When Carl died in 2022, he was succeeded by his grandson (Friedrich’s son) Wilhelm.

== Ancestry ==
Ancestors of Princess Pauline of Württemberg (1877–1965)

8. Prince Paul of Württemberg
4. Prince Frederick of Württemberg
9. Princess Charlotte of Saxe-Hildburghausen
2. William II of Württemberg
10. William I of Württemberg
5. Princess Catherine of Württemberg
11. Duchess Pauline Therese of Württemberg
1. Princess Pauline of Württemberg
12. George II, Prince of Waldeck and Pyrmont
6. George Victor, Prince of Waldeck and Pyrmont
13. Princess Emma of Anhalt-Bernburg-Schaumburg-Hoym
3. Princess Marie of Waldeck and Pyrmont
14. William, Duke of Nassau
7. Princess Helena of Nassau
15. Princess Pauline of Württemberg
