= Varchentin =

- Ortsteil of Groß Plasten
- Interactive map of Varchentin
- Location within Germany Location within Mecklenburg-Vorpommern
- Coordinates: 53°35′N 12°51′E
- Country: Germany
- State: Mecklenburg-Vorpommern
- District: Mecklenburgische Seenplatte
- Municipality: Groß Plasten

Area
  - Total: 17.31 km^{2} (6.68 sq mi)
- Elevation: 45 m (148 ft)

Population (2017-12-31)
  - Total: 291
  - Density: 16.8/km^{2} (43.5/sq mi)
- Time zone: UTC+01:00 (CET)
  - Summer (DST): UTC+02:00 (CEST)
- Postal codes: 17192
- Dialling codes: 039934
- Website: www.amt-slw.de

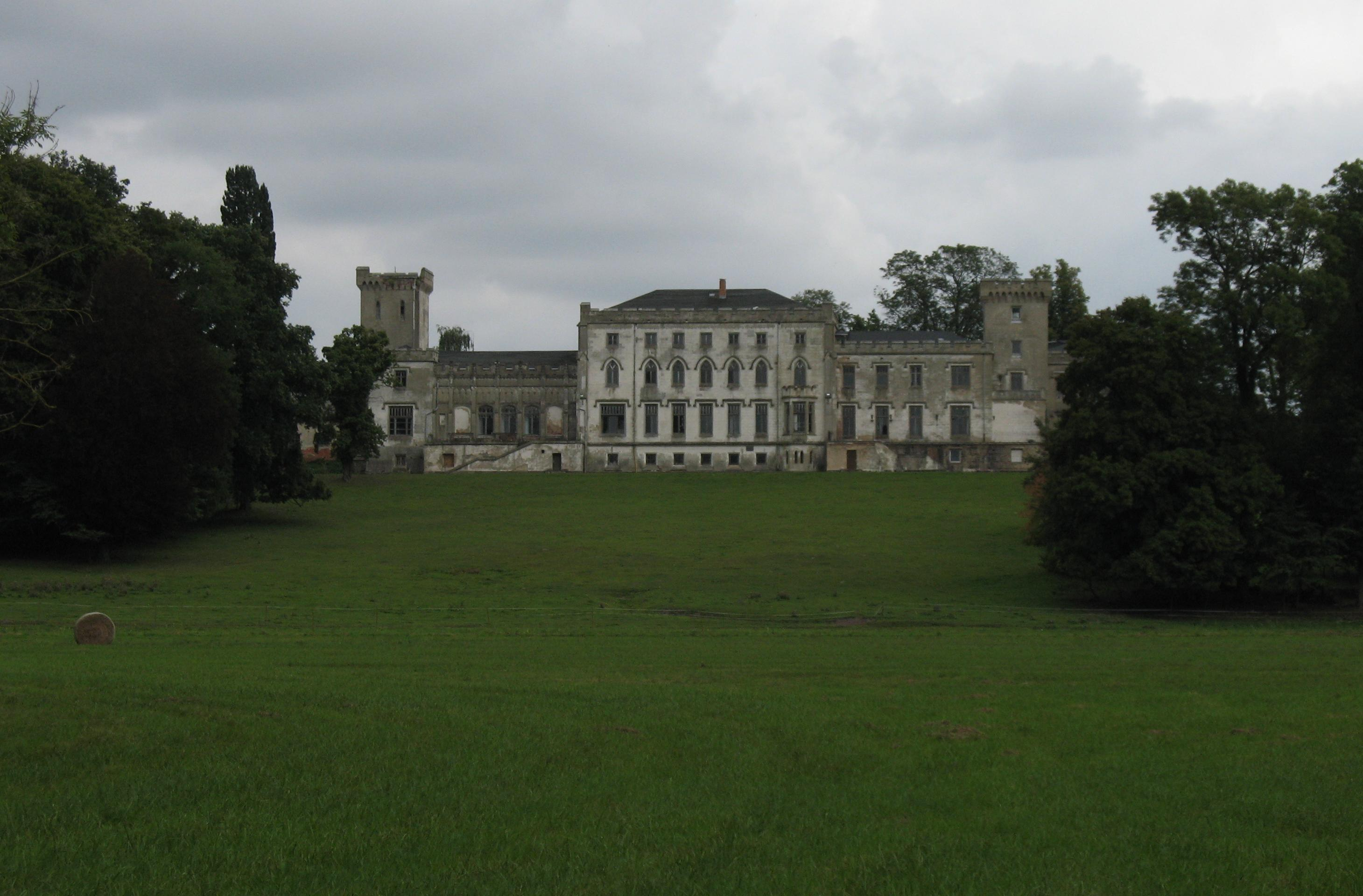
Park by Lenné and mansion

Varchentin is a village and a former municipality in the Mecklenburgische Seenplatte district, in Mecklenburg-Vorpommern, Germany. Since May 2019, it is part of the municipality Groß Plasten.
