= Friedrich, Prince of Wied =

William Frederick
- Prince of Wied
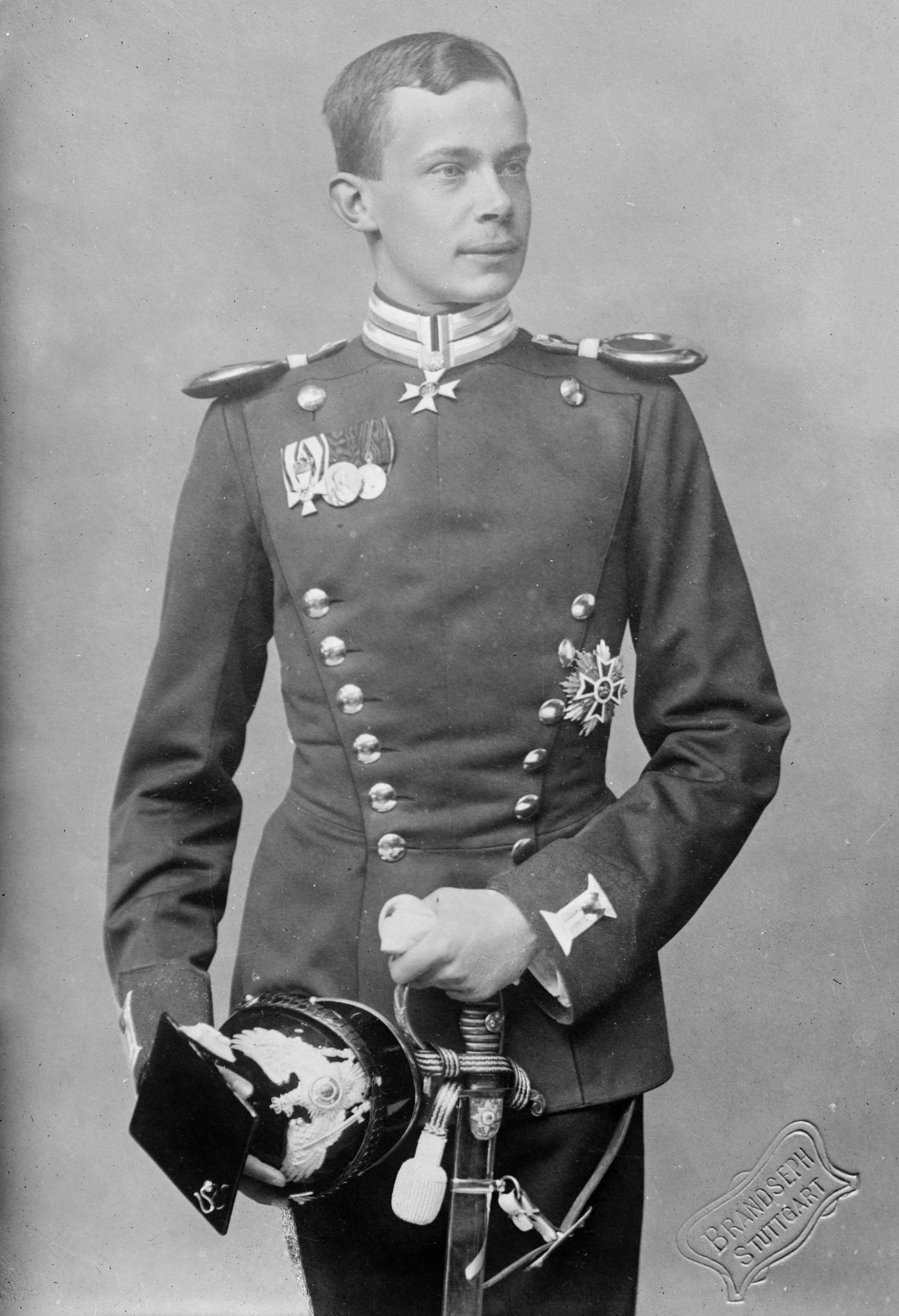
- Friedrich in 1910
- Born: 27 June 1872; Neuwied, Kingdom of Prussia
- Died: 18 June 1945 (aged 72); Neuwied, Allied-occupied Germany
- Spouse: Princess Pauline of Württemberg (m. 1898)
- Issue Detail: Hermann, Hereditary Prince of Wied; Prince Dietrich
Names
- German: Wilhelm Friedrich Hermann Otto Karl Fürst von Wied
- House: Wied-Neuwied
- Father: William, Prince of Wied
- Mother: Princess Marie of the Netherlands

William Frederick, Prince of Wied (German: Wilhelm Friedrich Hermann Otto Karl Fürst von Wied; 27 June 1872 – 18 June 1945) was a German nobleman, eldest child of William, Prince of Wied. He was an elder brother of William, Prince of Albania.

== Early life ==
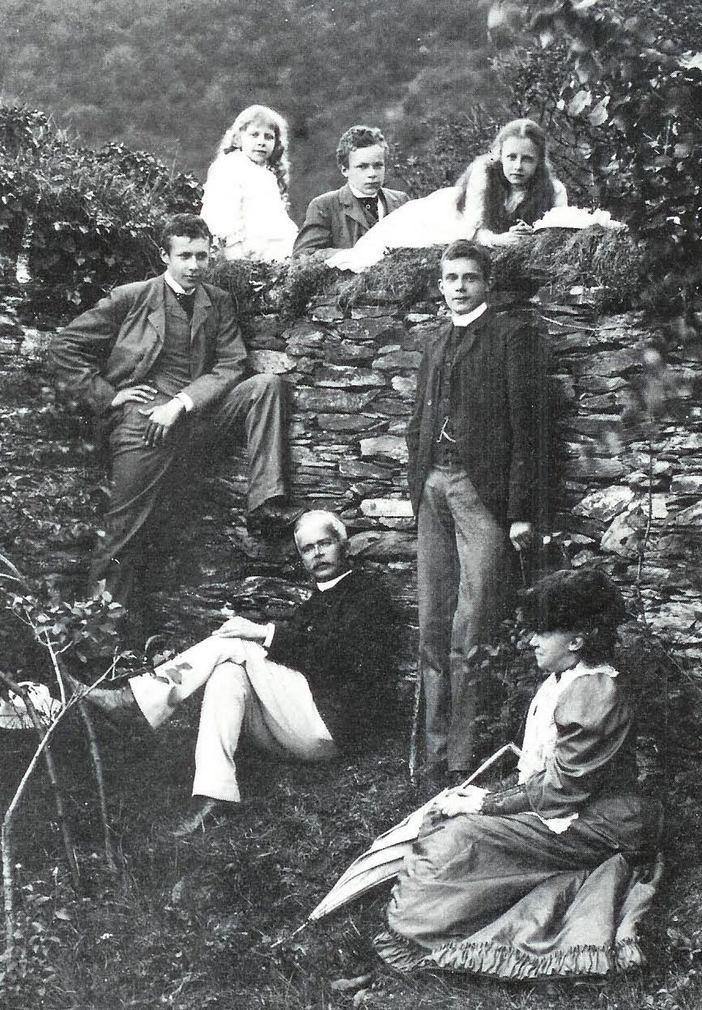
Prince William Frederick with his parents and siblings, c. 1890.

Prince William Frederick of Wied was born at Neuwied near Koblenz, in the Prussian Rhineland, a province of the Kingdom of Prussia. He was the first child of William, Prince of Wied (1845–1907; son of Hermann, Prince of Wied and Princess Marie of Nassau) and his wife, Princess Marie of the Netherlands (1841–1910; daughter of Prince Frederick of the Netherlands and his wife Princess Louise of Prussia). He was descended from George II of Great Britain through both his parents. His great-grandparents were William I of the Netherlands and Frederick William III of Prussia. He was a nephew of Queen Elisabeth of Romania.

== Marriage ==
William Frederick married on 29 October 1898 in Stuttgart, Princess Pauline of Württemberg (1877–1965), only daughter of King William II of Württemberg and his first wife, Princess Marie of Waldeck and Pyrmont, daughter of George Victor, Prince of Waldeck and Pyrmont. They had two sons:

- Hermann, Hereditary Prince of Wied (18 August 1899 – 5 November 1941); married Countess Marie Antonia of Stolberg-Wernigerode and had issue, including Frederick William, Prince of Wied, who married Princess Guda (his second cousin twice removed), daughter of Josias, Hereditary Prince of Waldeck and Pyrmont.
- Prince Dietrich of Wied (30 October 1901 – 8 June 1976); married Countess Antoinette Julia Grote and had issue. Dietrich and Antoinette are great-grandparents of Wilhelm, Duke of Württemberg.

== Prince of Wied ==
William Frederick inherited the title of Prince of Wied after the death of his father in 1907. After the German Revolution in 1919 all nobility titles were abolished. He became the titular Prince, or Fürst, until his death in 1945, upon which the title was inherited by his 14-year-old grandson Frederick William (1931–2000). His son Hermann had predeceased him, having died of wounds received in action during World War II in Rzeszów, Poland.

== Honours ==
He received the following orders and decorations:

- Kingdom of Prussia:
  - Knight of the Red Eagle, 3rd Class with Crown, 18 July 1896; 2nd Class
  - Knight of the Royal Crown Order, 1st Class
  - Knight of Honour of the Johanniter Order
- Württemberg: Grand Cross of the Württemberg Crown, 1898; with Swords, 5 October 1916
- Principality of Lippe: Cross of Honour of the House Order of Lippe, 1st Class
- Kingdom of Saxony: Grand Cross of the Albert Order
- Waldeck and Pyrmont: Order of Merit, 1st Class
- (Austrian Empire) (Kingdom of Hungary) Austria-Hungary: Grand Cross of the Imperial Order of Leopold, 1909
- Luxembourg:
  - Knight of the Gold Lion of Nassau
  - Grand Cross of the Oak Crown
- Netherlands: Grand Cross of the Netherlands Lion
- Kingdom of Romania: Grand Cross of the Crown of Romania
- Sweden-Norway: Commander Grand Cross of the Polar Star, 17 June 1894
- United Kingdom: Honorary Knight Grand Cross of the Royal Victorian Order

== Ancestry ==
Ancestors of Friedrich, Prince of Wied

8. Johann August Karl, Prince of Wied
4. Hermann, Prince of Wied
9. Princess Sophie Auguste of Solms-Braunfels
2. Wilhelm, Prince of Wied
10. William, Duke of Nassau
5. Princess Marie of Nassau
11. Princess Louise of Saxe-Hildburghausen
1. Friedrich, Prince of Wied
12. William I of the Netherlands
6. Prince Frederick of the Netherlands
13. Princess Wilhelmine of Prussia
3. Princess Marie of the Netherlands
14. Frederick William III of Prussia
7. Princess Louise of Prussia
15. Duchess Louise of Mecklenburg-Strelitz

== Notes ==
Friedrich, Prince of Wied House of Wied-Neuwied Cadet branch of the House of Wied Born: 27 June 1872 Died: 18 June 1945
German nobility
Preceded by William	Prince of Wied; 1907–1919	Succeeded by German nobility titles abolished
Titles in pretence
Loss of title	— TITULAR — Prince of Wied; 1919 – 1945; Reason for succession failure: German nobility titles abolished	Succeeded by Frederick William
