= Van Bergen's Regiment of Militia =

Militia in the American Revolutionary War

- Active: 1777
- Allegiance: State of New York
- Type: militia
- Part of: New York Militia
- Engagements: Saratoga

Commanders
- Notable commanders: Antony Van Bergen

The Van Bergen's Regiment of Militia, also known as the 11th Albany County Militia Regiment, was called up in July, 1777 at Coxsackie, New York to reinforce General Horatio Gates's Continental Army during the Saratoga Campaign. The regiment served in Brigadier General Abraham Ten Broeck's Brigade. With the defeat of General John Burgoyne's British Army on October 17, 1777, the regiment stood down.

== See also ==
- Albany County militia
