= Carol Victor, Hereditary Prince of Albania =

German-Albanian prince (1913–1973)

Carol Victor
- Hereditary Prince of Albania; Prince of Wied
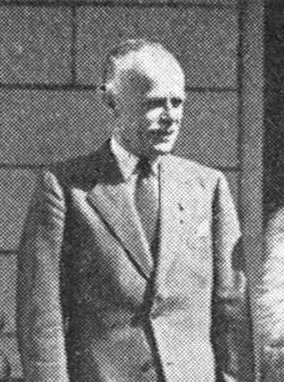

Head of the Princely House of Albania
- Tenure: 18 April 1945 – 8 December 1973
- Predecessor: William, Prince of Albania
- Successor: None
- Born: 19 May 1913; Potsdam, Prussia, Germany
- Died: 8 December 1973 (aged 60); Munich, Bavaria, West Germany
- Burial: Neuwied, Rhineland-Palatinate, Germany
- Spouse: Eileen Johnston (m. 1966)
Names
- Karl Viktor Wilhelm Friedrich Ernst Günther
- House: Wied-Neuwied
- Father: William, Prince of Albania
- Mother: Princess Sophie of Schönburg-Waldenburg
- Religion: Protestantism

Carol Victor, Hereditary Prince of Albania (Karl Viktor Wilhelm Friedrich Ernst Günther zu Wied, 19 May 1913 – 8 December 1973), was the only son of William, Prince of Albania, and briefly heir to the Principality of Albania. He held the title of Hereditary Prince of Albania. He was also styled Skënder, in homage to Skanderbeg, the national hero.

== Early life ==
=== Birth and family ===
Carol Victor was born on 19 May 1913 in Potsdam, Kingdom of Prussia, as Prince Charles Victor of Wied (German: Karl Viktor Prinz zu Wied). He was the second child and only son of Prince William Frederick of Wied (1876–1945), son of William, Prince of Wied, and Princess Marie of the Netherlands, and his wife, Princess Sophie of Schönburg-Waldenburg (1885–1936), daughter of Victor, Hereditary Prince of Schönburg-Waldenburg and his wife, Princess Lucia of Sayn-Wittgenstein-Berleburg. Through his paternal grandmother he was related with the Dutch royal family. His great-grandparents were King William I of the Netherlands and King Frederick William III of Prussia. He had some remote Albanian ancestry through his mother, being a descendant of Ruxandra Ghica, daughter of Grigore I Ghica, Prince of Wallachia.

=== Hereditary Prince of Albania ===
Styles of Hereditary Prince Carol Victor of Albania
- Reference style: His Highness
- Spoken style: Your Highness

On 7 March 1914, appointed by the Great Powers of Europe, his father William was created Prince of Albania. After his father became Prince, he held the title of Hereditary Prince of Albania.

With Albania in a state of civil war since July 1914, Greece occupying the south of the country, the great powers at war with one another, the regime collapsed, and so all of his family left the country on 3 September 1914 originally heading to Venice. Despite leaving Albania his father insisted that he remained head of state. In the spring of 1924, the Albanian parliament debated the form of government and Milto Tutulani, a senator, appointed Prince William, his son Carol Victor or a Briton as a monarch.

=== Education ===
Carol Victor first attended the Wilhelmsgymnasium in Munich, after that studied law at Tübingen, Munich, Königsberg and Würzburg universities. His doctoral thesis on criminal procedure was published in Stuttgart in 1936. He was a keen swordsman and enjoyed skiing. In 1937, Swire described him as a young man of great ability, with his father's good nature.

== World War II ==
During the Second World War, Carol Victor served as an officer in the German army in Romania, and in the autumn of 1941 there was speculation that the Germans, who had occupied Kingdom of Yugoslavia, including the Kosovo with Albanian majority, would use him to rally Albanians to the German cause. This worried Mussolini's Foreign Minister, Count Ciano, to such extent that in November 1941, he accused the Germans of aiming to construct a new Albanian state led by Prince Carol Victor, which would be anti-Italian and whose militia would take oath directly to Hitler. There appeared to be little truth to Ciano's fears, and the Germans reassured him they had no such ambition for the prince. At the time of second/third Battle of Cassino he belonged to the 44th Infantry Division.

On the death of his father, on 18 April 1945 at Predeal, near Sinaia, in Romania, he succeeded as Head of the Princely House of Albania (Wied) and Sovereign Grand Master of the Order of the Black Eagle although he made no public claim to the throne of Albania. Within less than a year of his father's death, both his uncles William Frederick (6. Fürst zu Wied) and Victor, former German ambassador to Sweden (1933 -1943) died. Also in 1945, his uncle Günther (5. Fürst von Schönburg-Waldenburg), Sophie's brother, was expropriated without compensation and interned at Rügen island (Sächsische Biografie). His sister, Princess Marie Eleonore of Albania (Princesha e Shqipërisë) died in a communist internment camp at Miercurea Ciuc, Romania, on 29 September 1956, without issue.

== Later life ==
In 1952, Carol Victor wrote a bibliographical survey of his ancestor the German explorer, ethnologist and naturalist Prince Maximilian of Wied-Neuwied. Later he wrote "Maximilian Prinz zu Wied, sein Leben und seine Reisen" in Maximilian Prinz zu Wied, unveröffentliche Bilder und Handschriften zur Völkerkunde Brasiliens, Josef Röder and Hermann Trimborn (editors), Bonn, Ferdinand Dümmler, 1954), pages 13 – 25.

In 1960, Carol Victor left the Munich society "Freunde des Balletts", of which he was president since its foundation in 1956. The following year he published the book: "Königinnen des Balletts: Zweihundert Jahre europäisches Ballett".

== Marriage ==
On 8 September 1966, whilst living in New York City, Carol Victor married morganatically the English-born widow Eileen de Coppet, whose first husband had been Captain André de Coppet (1892 –1953). They had no children; de Coppet was in her forties when the marriage occurred.

Carol Victor and Eileen lived later in Cheyne Walk, Chelsea, London.

Carol Victor died seven years later without issue in Munich. He was buried at Neuwied. His widow lived on until 1985. The Princely House of Albania became extinct on his death as he had no children, and no arrangements had been put in place for a successor.

== Ancestry ==
Ancestors of Carol Victor, Hereditary Prince of Albania

8. Hermann, Prince of Wied
4. William, Prince of Wied
9. Princess Marie of Nassau
2. Vidi I of Albania
10. Prince Frederick of the Netherlands
5. Princess Marie of the Netherlands
11. Princess Louise of Prussia
1. Carol Victor, Hereditary Prince of Albania
12. Otto, Prince of Schönburg-Waldenburg
6. Victor, Hereditary Prince of Schönburg-Waldenburg
13. Pàmela Labunska
3. Princess Sophie of Schönburg-Waldenburg
14. Emil, Prince of Sayn-Wittgenstein-Berleburg
7. Princess Lucia of Sayn-Wittgenstein-Berleburg
15. Princess Pulcheria Cantacuzene

== Notes and sources ==
Carol Victor, Hereditary Prince of Albania House of Wied-Neuwied Cadet branch of the House of Wied Born: 19 May 1913 Died: 8 December 1973
Titles in pretence
Preceded by William I	— TITULAR — Prince of Albania; 18 April 1945 – 8 December 1973; Reason for succession failure: Republic proclaimed in 1925	Extinct
