= Princess Marie Eleonore of Albania =

Princess Marie Eleonore
- Princess Alfred of Schönburg-Waldenburg; Princess of Albania
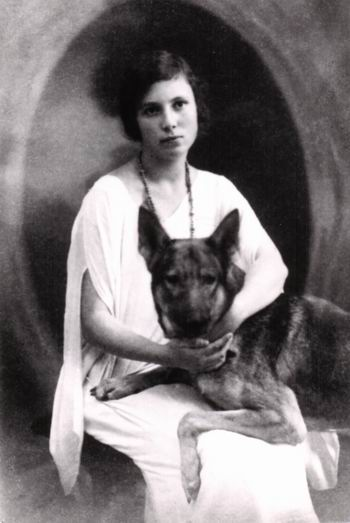
- Born: 19 February 1909; Potsdam, Prussia
- Died: 29 September 1956 (aged 47); Miercurea Ciuc, Romanian People's Republic (now Romania)
- Burial: Neuwied, Germany
- Spouse: Prince Alfred of Schönburg-Waldenburg (m. 1937; died 1941) Ion Octavian Bunea (m. 1948)
Names
- Marie Eleonore Elisabeth Cecilie Mathilde Lucie
- House: Wied-Neuwied
- Father: William, Prince of Albania
- Mother: Princess Sophie of Schönburg-Waldenburg
- Religion: Protestant

Princess Marie Eleonore of Albania, Princess of Wied (Marie Eleonore Elisabeth Cecilie Mathilde Lucie Prinzessin von Wied; 19 February 1909 – 29 September 1956) was the only daughter of William, Prince of Albania and Princess Sophie of Schönburg-Waldenburg.

She held the title of Princess of Albania. She was also styled Donika, in homage to Donika Kastrioti.

== Life ==
Princess Marie Eleonore of Wied was born on 19 February 1909 at Potsdam, Brandenburg, Prussia. She was elder sister of Carol Victor, Hereditary Prince of Albania.

She married, firstly, Prince Alfred of Schönburg-Waldenburg, son of Prince Heinrich of Schönburg-Waldenburg and Princess Olga of Löwenstein-Wertheim-Freudenberg, on 16 November 1937 at Munich, Bavaria, Germany.

She married, secondly, Ion Octavian Bunea, son of Aureliu Bunea, on 5 February 1949 at Bucharest, Romania. She became a Romanian citizen after this marriage.

She was arrested by the Romanian communist authorities on 25 July, 1949.

She died without issue at age 47, on 29 September 1956 at a communist internment camp in Miercurea Ciuc, Romania.

== Ancestry ==
Ancestors of Princess Marie Eleonore of Albania

8. Hermann, Prince of Wied
4. William, Prince of Wied
9. Princess Marie of Nassau
2. William, Prince of Albania
10. Prince Frederick of the Netherlands
5. Princess Marie of the Netherlands
11. Princess Louise of Prussia
1. Princess Marie Eleonore of Albania
12. Otto, Prince of Schönburg-Waldenburg
6. Victor, Hereditary Prince of Schönburg-Waldenburg
13. Pàmela Labunska
3. Princess Sophie of Schönburg-Waldenburg
14. Emil, Prince of Sayn-Wittgenstein-Berleburg
7. Princess Lucia of Sayn-Wittgenstein-Berleburg
15. Princess Pulcheria Cantacuzene
