= Wilhelm, Prince of Albania =

Prince of Albania (1876–1945)

Wilhelm I
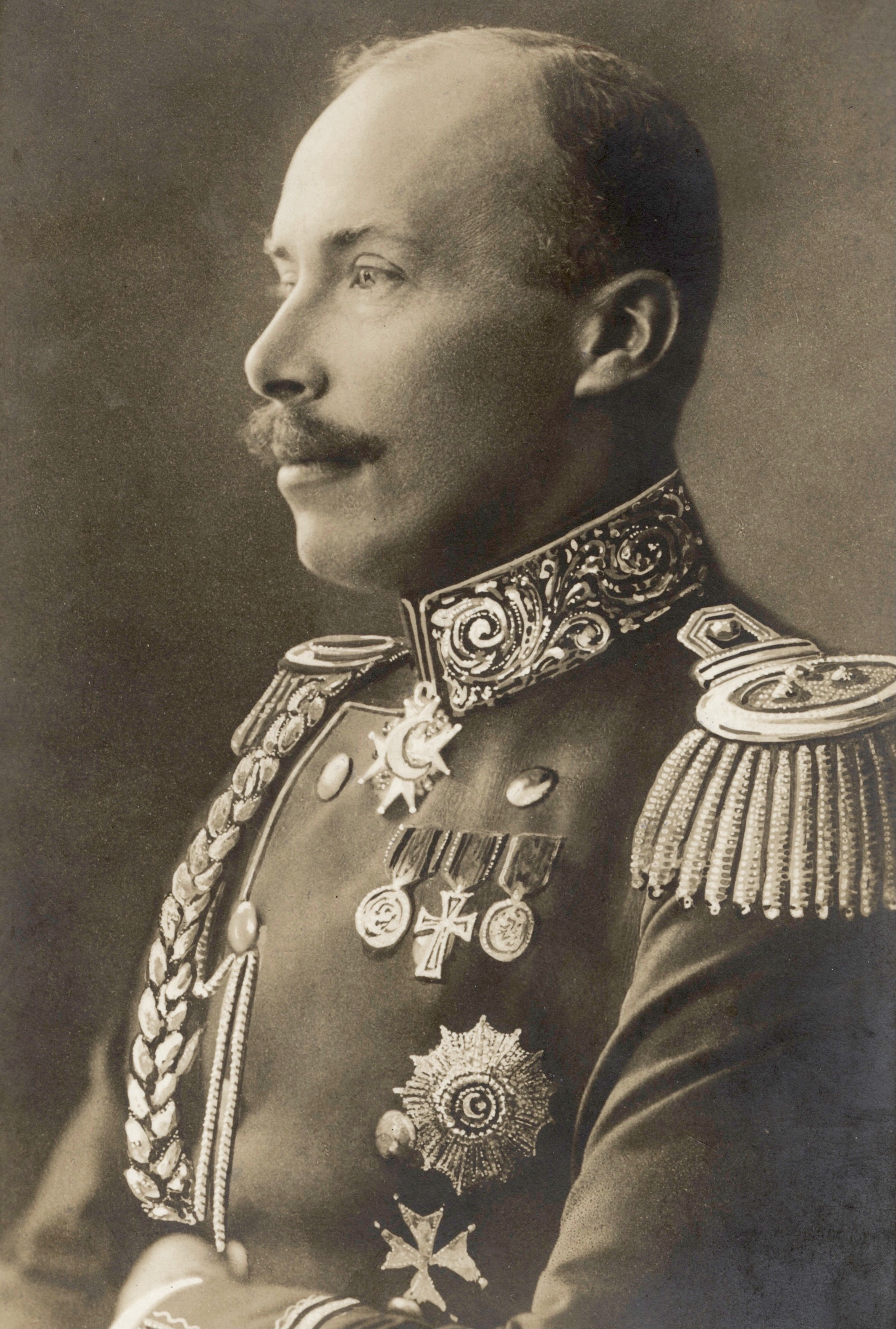
- Formal portrait, 1914

Prince of Albania
- Reign: 21 February 1914 – 31 January 1925 (Note: The de facto end of his reign, however, was on September 3, 1914)
- Coronation: 21 February 1914 (Note: An official delegation of Albania, led by Essad Pasha Toptani, made a formal request, which he accepted thereby becoming By the grace of the powers and the will of the people the Prince (Mbret) of Albania.)
- Predecessor: Monarchy established
- Successor: Regency; Zog I as next monarch, 1928–1939
- Born: 26 March 1876; Schloss Neuwied, Neuwied, Germany
- Died: 18 April 1945 (aged 69); Predeal, Romania
- Burial: Lutheran Church, Bucharest, Romania
- Spouse: Princess Sophie of Schönburg-Waldenburg (m. 1906; died 1936)
- Issue: Princess Marie Eleonore of Albania; Carol Victor, Hereditary Prince of Albania
Names
- Wilhelm Friedrich Heinrich
- House: Wied-Neuwied
- Father: Wilhelm, Prince of Wied
- Mother: Princess Marie of the Netherlands
- Religion: Protestantism

Wilhelm, Prince of Albania (Wilhelm Friedrich Heinrich; Albanian: Vilhelm, Princ i Shqipërisë, 26 March 1876 – 18 April 1945) was sovereign of the Principality of Albania from 7 March to 3 September 1914. His reign officially came to an end on 31 January 1925, when the country was declared an Albanian Republic.

Outside the country and in diplomatic correspondence, he was styled "sovereign prince", but in Albania, he was referred to as mbret, or king.

== Family and early life ==
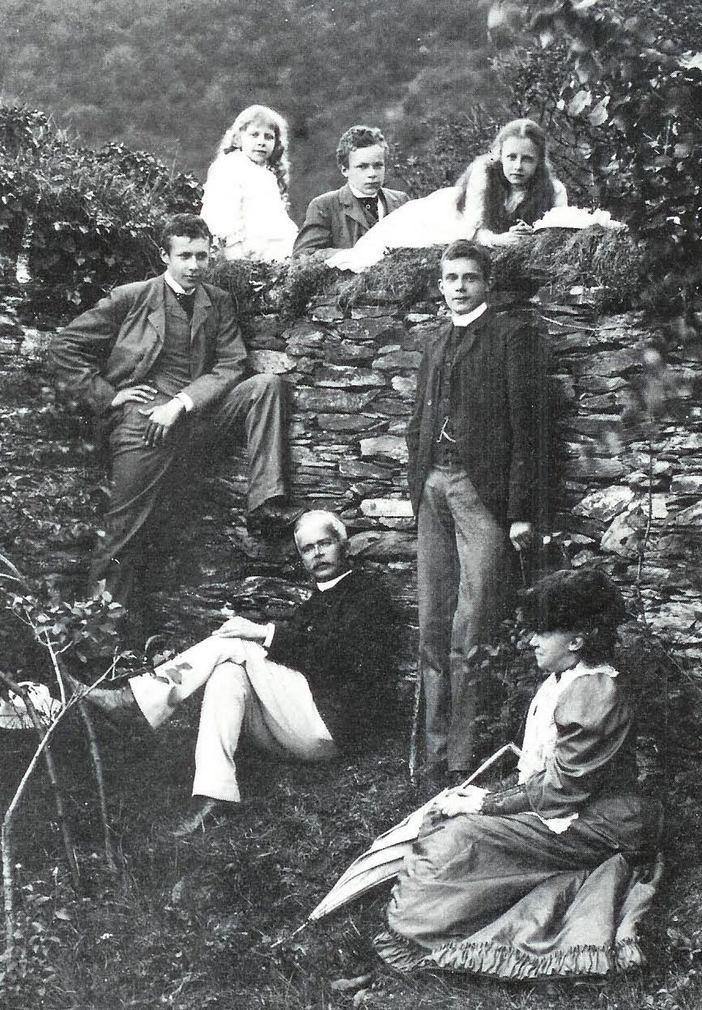
Prince Wilhelm with his parents and siblings, c. 1890.

William was born on 26 March 1876 in Neuwied Castle, near Koblenz, in the Prussian Rhineland, as Prince William of Wied (German: Wilhelm Friedrich Heinrich Prinz zu Wied). Born into the mediatised house of Wied-Neuwied, he was the third son of William, 5th Prince of Wied (brother of Queen Elisabeth of Romania), and his wife Princess Marie of the Netherlands (sister of Queen Louise of Sweden). He was second cousin of Wilhelm II, German Emperor.

Prince William served as a Prussian cavalry officer before becoming a captain in the German General Staff in 1911.

== Candidate for the Albanian throne ==
During the First Balkan War, Albania had declared its independence from the Ottoman Empire in November 1912, which was recognized in the Treaty of London in 1913. Prince William's aunt, Queen Elisabeth of Romania, on learning that the Great Powers were looking for an aristocrat to rule over Albania, asked Take Ionescu to attempt to persuade them to appoint her nephew to the post.

Great Arms of Prince Wilhelm

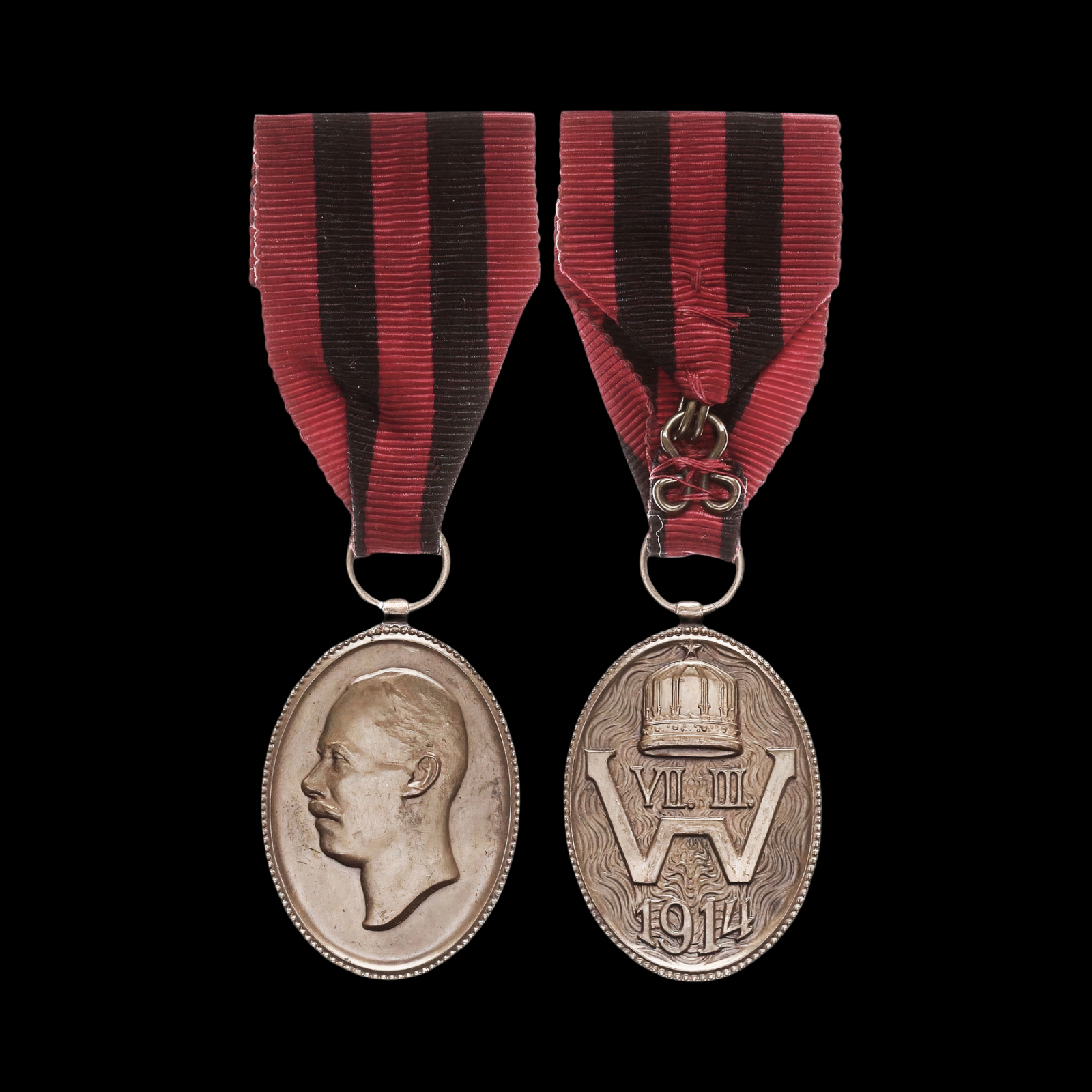
Prince Wilhelm of Wied accession medal

Eventually the European Great Powers – Austria-Hungary, the United Kingdom of Great Britain and Ireland, the French Third Republic, the German Empire, the Russian Empire and the Kingdom of Italy – selected William, a member of the German princely house of Wied, and related to the Queen of the Netherlands to rule over the newly independent Albania. The announcement was made in November 1913 and the decision was accepted by Ismail Kemal, the head of the provisional government. The offer of the Albanian throne was first made to him in the spring of 1913 but he turned it down. Despite rejecting the offer, the Austrians put pressure on Prince William in an attempt to change his mind. Kaiser Wilhelm was not pleased with the selection of the prince as the king of Albania; considering the choice to be unwise. The Kaiser claimed that he tried to have "a Mohammedan Prince chosen, if possible".

Western Europeans considered Albania to be a poor, lawless and antiquated country, and some foreign opinion was scathing. The French press referred to Wilhelm as "le Prince de Vide", meaning "the prince of emptiness"; vide being a pun on his homeland of Wied.

== Prince of Albania ==
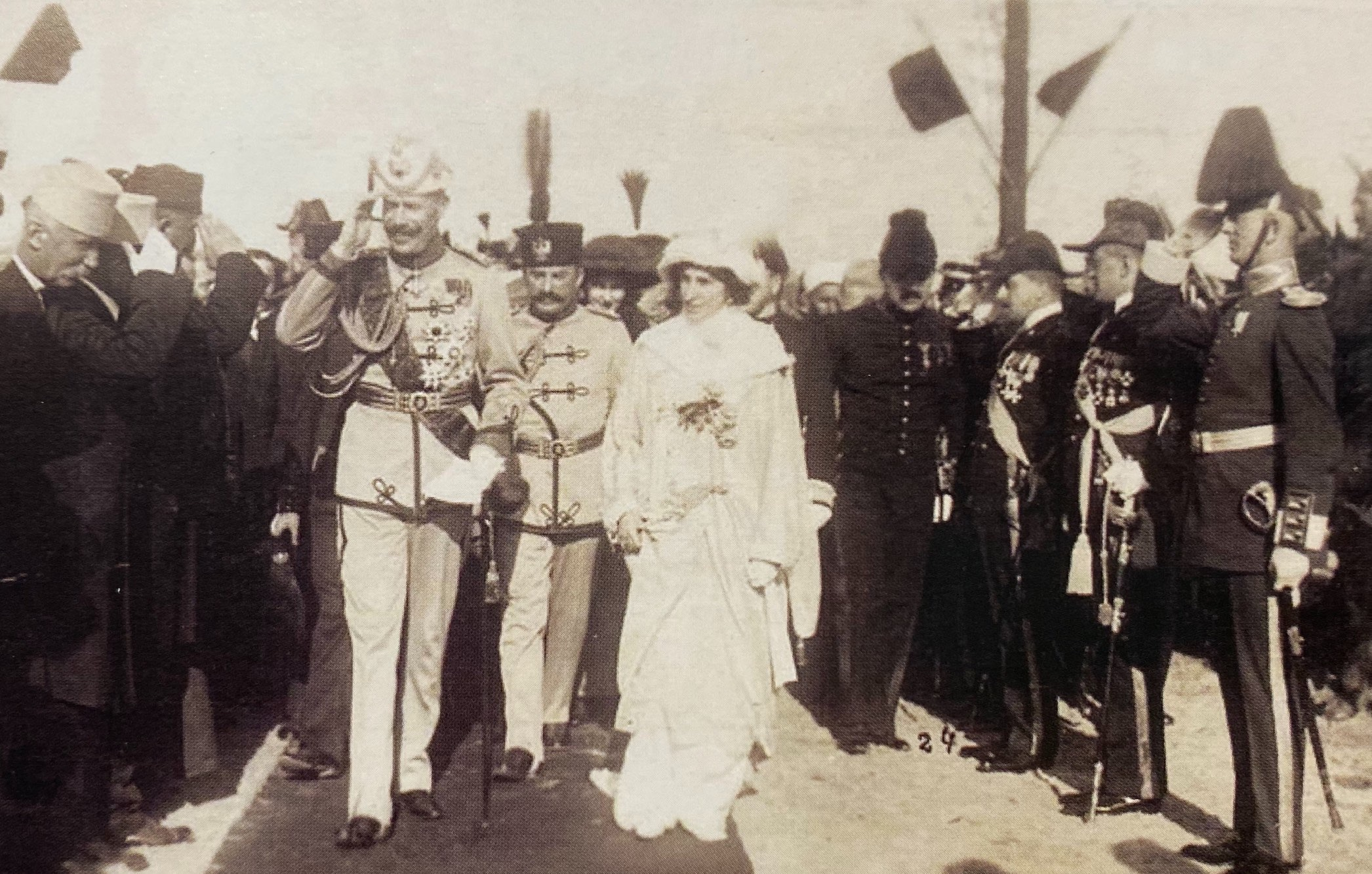
Prince William and his wife Princess Sophie arriving in Durrës on 7 March 1914

On 7 February 1914, William let the Great Powers know that he would accept the throne. On 21 February 1914 a delegation of Albanian notables led by Essad Pasha Toptani and Arbëreshë ones (headed by Luigi Baffa and Vincenzo Baffa Trasci), made a formal request, which he accepted thereby becoming By the grace of the powers and the will of the people the Prince (Mbret) of Albania. One month after accepting the throne on 7 March, he arrived in his provisional capital of Durrës and started to organise his government, appointing Turhan Pasha Përmeti to form the first Albanian cabinet. This first cabinet was dominated by aristocrats, with prince Essad Pasha Toptani as minister of defence and foreign affairs, prince Gjergj Adhamidhi bej Frashëri as minister of finances, and prince Aziz Pasha Vrioni as minister of agriculture.

His brief reign proved a turbulent one. Immediately following his arrival, revolts of Muslims broke out in central Albania against his Chief Minister, Essad Pasha, and against foreign domination that was not Turkish. Greece encouraged the formation of a separatist provisional government in North Epirus. William's position was also undermined by his own officials, notably Essad Pasha himself, who actually accepted money from Italy to finance a revolt and to stage a coup against William. The plot was exposed, Essad Pasha was arrested on 19 May 1914, tried for treason and sentenced to death. Only the intervention of the Italian government saved his life and he escaped to exile in Italy.

The outbreak of World War I presented more problems for Prince William as Austria-Hungary demanded that he send Albanian soldiers to fight alongside them. When he refused, citing the neutrality of Albania in the Treaty of London, the remuneration that he had been receiving was cut off.

== Reign in exile, overthrow, and death ==
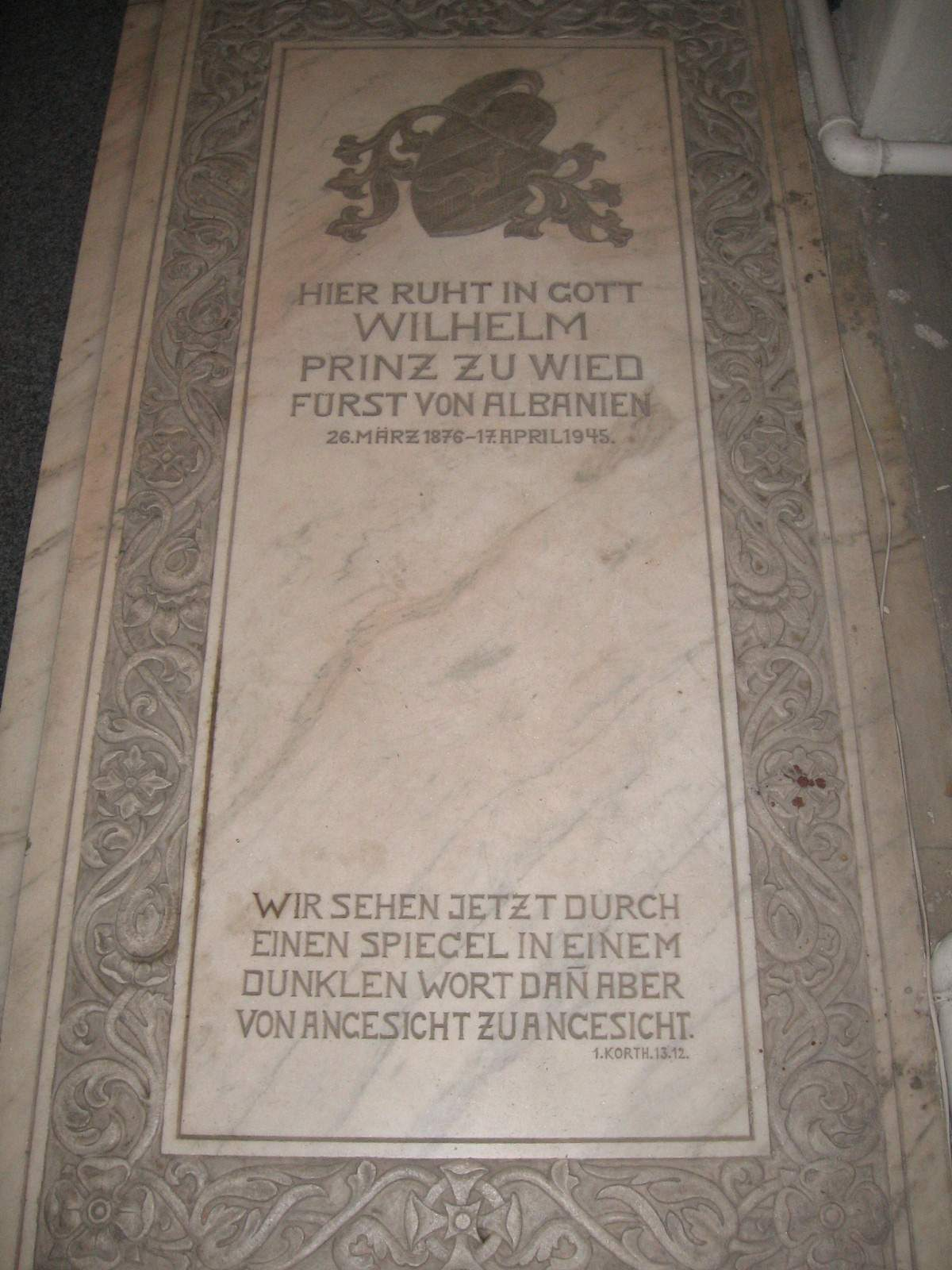
His tombstone at the Lutheran Church, Bucharest

Prince William left the country on 3 September 1914 originally heading to Venice. Despite leaving Albania he did so insisting that he remained head of state. In his proclamation he informed the people that "he deemed it necessary to absent himself temporarily." He was also styled Skanderbeg II, in homage to Skanderbeg, the national hero.

He returned to Germany and rejoined the Imperial German Army under the pseudonym "Count of Kruja" (German: Graf von Kruja). The name derived from the city of Krujë in Albania. When the Austro-Hungarians forced the Serbian and Montenegrin armies out of Northern Albania in the early months of 1916, William's hopes of being restored were raised although ultimately they came to nothing. After the war, he still harboured ambitions that he might be restored, but the participants at the Paris Peace Conference were unlikely to restore the throne to someone who had just fought against them.

Although several of the factions competing for power in post-war Albania billed themselves as regencies for William, once central authority was definitively restored in 1924, the country was declared a republic on 31 January 1925, officially ending his reign.

With the monarchy in Albania set to be restored with President Ahmet Zogu becoming king, Prince William reaffirmed his claim to the throne announcing he still claimed the throne for himself and his heirs.

Prince William died in Predeal, near Sinaia, in Romania, leaving his son, Hereditary Prince Carol Victor, as heir to his Albanian claims. He was buried at the Lutheran Church in Bucharest.

== Marriage and children ==
On 30 November 1906 at Waldenburg, Saxony, Prince William married Princess Sophie of Schönburg-Waldenburg (1885–1936), member of the House of Schönburg, daughter of Hereditary Prince Otto Karl Viktor I von Schönburg-Waldenburg (1856-1888) and his wife, Princess Lucie zu Sayn-Wittgenstein-Berleburg (1859-1903). She had remotely distant Albanian roots, through Orthodox Ghica family. They had two children:

- Princess Marie Eleonore (1909–1956) ⚭ Prince Alfred of Schönburg-Waldenburg (1905–1941), son of Prince Heinrich of Schönburg-Waldenburg and Princess Olga of Löwenstein-Wertheim-Freudenberg ⚭ Ion Octavian Bunea (1899–1977)
- Hereditary Prince Carol Victor (1913–1973) ⚭ Eileen de Coppet (1922–1985)

== Honors ==
- Albania: Founder and Sovereign of the Princely Order of the Black Eagle, 26 March 1914
- Russia: Knight of St. Alexander Nevsky, 27 February 1914
- Sweden: Commander Grand Cross of the Polar Star, 1896
- Württemberg: Grand Cross of the Friedrich Order, 29 October 1898
- Romania:
  - Grand Cross of the Star of Romania, 4 December 1913
  - Grand Cross of the Crown of Romania
- Italy: Grand Cross of Saints Maurice and Lazarus, 10 February 1914
- Austria-Hungary: Grand Cross of the Imperial Order of Leopold, 13 February 1914
- France: Grand Cross of the Legion of Honour, 19 February 1914
- Prussia:
  - Grand Cross of the Red Eagle, 25 February 1914
  - Knight of Honor of the Johanniter Order
  - Knight of the Prussian Crown, 3rd Class
- Bulgaria: Knight of the Royal Order of Military Merit, 5th Class

== Gallery ==
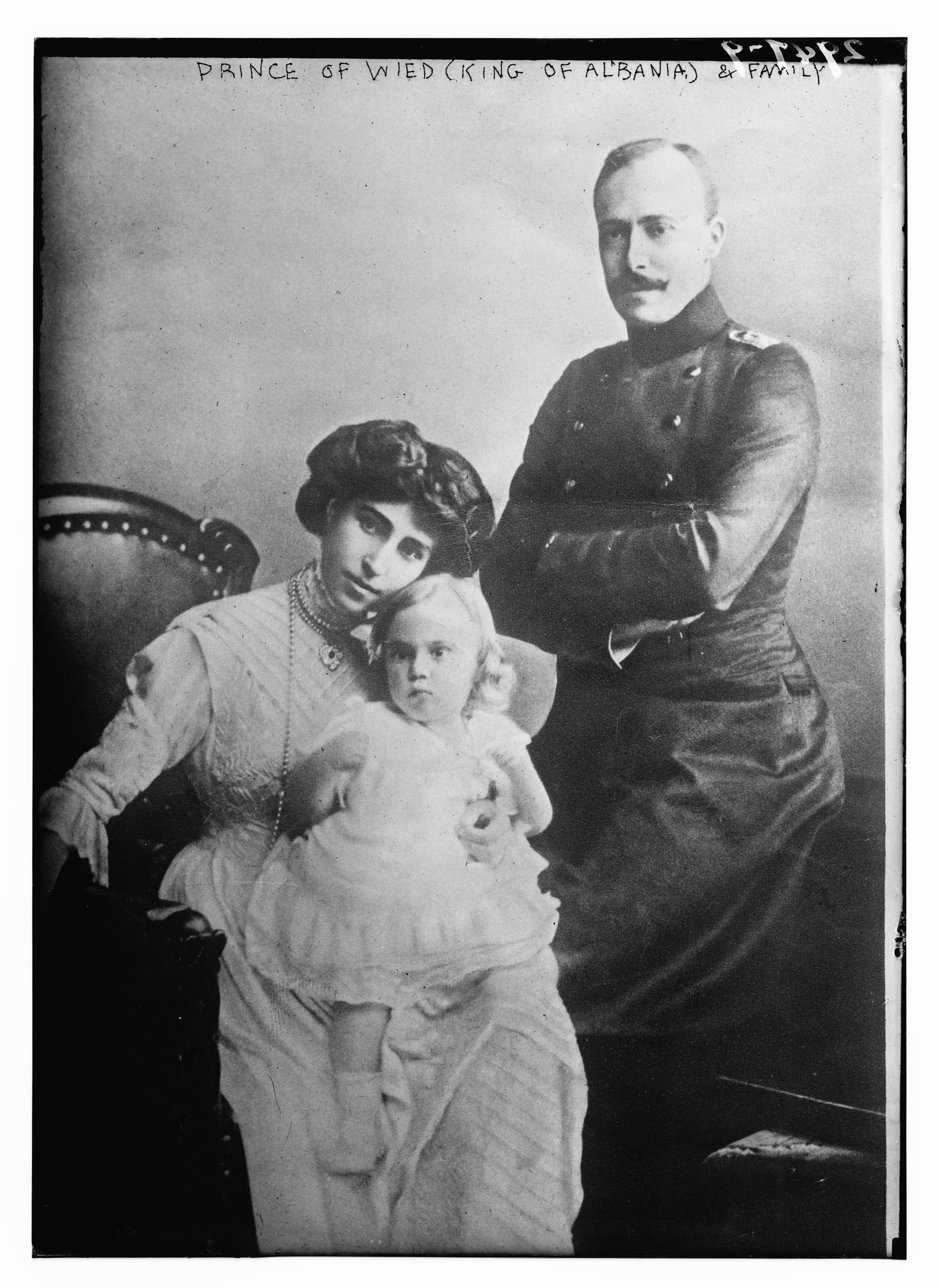
1909

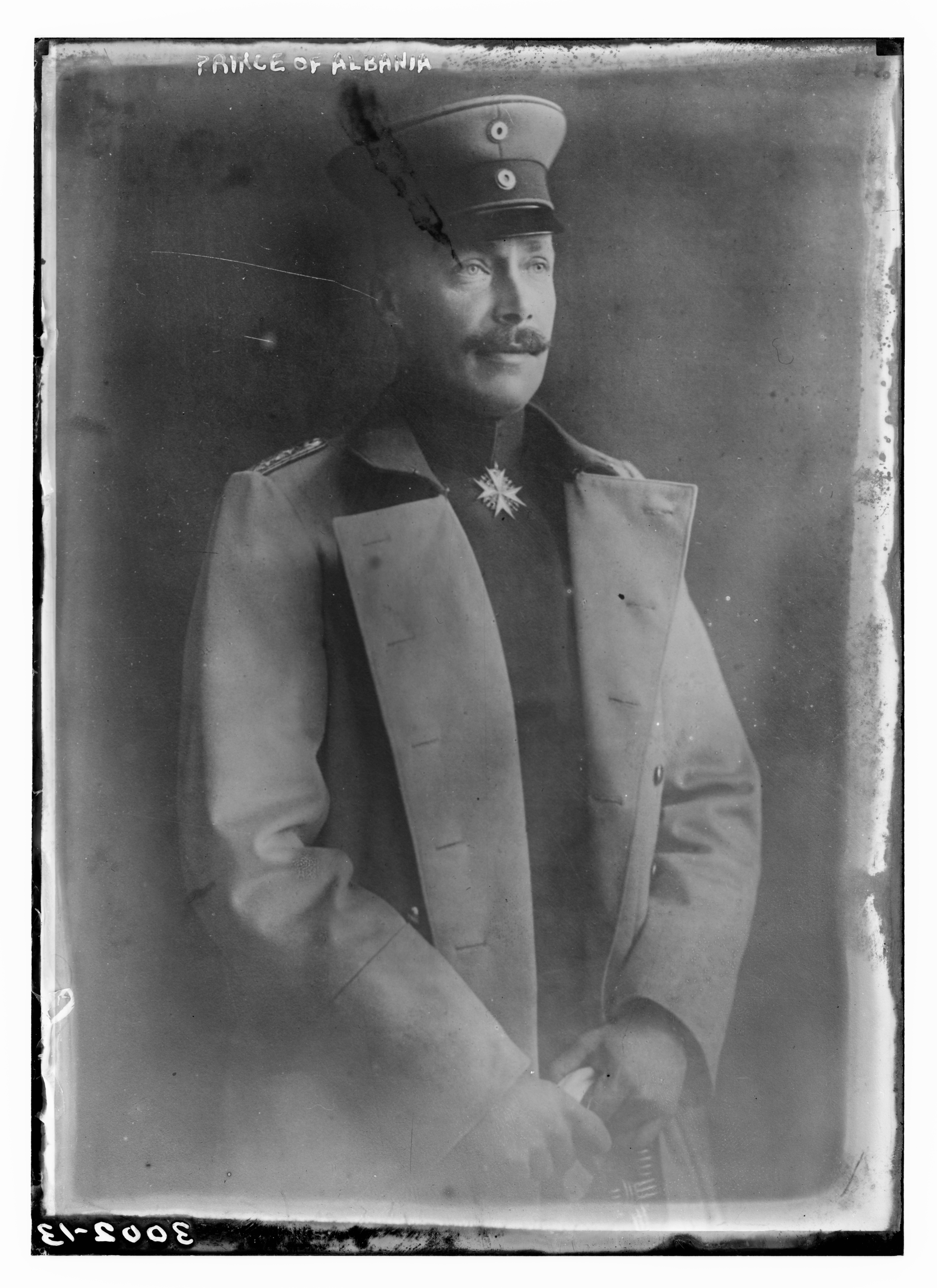
1913 (circa)

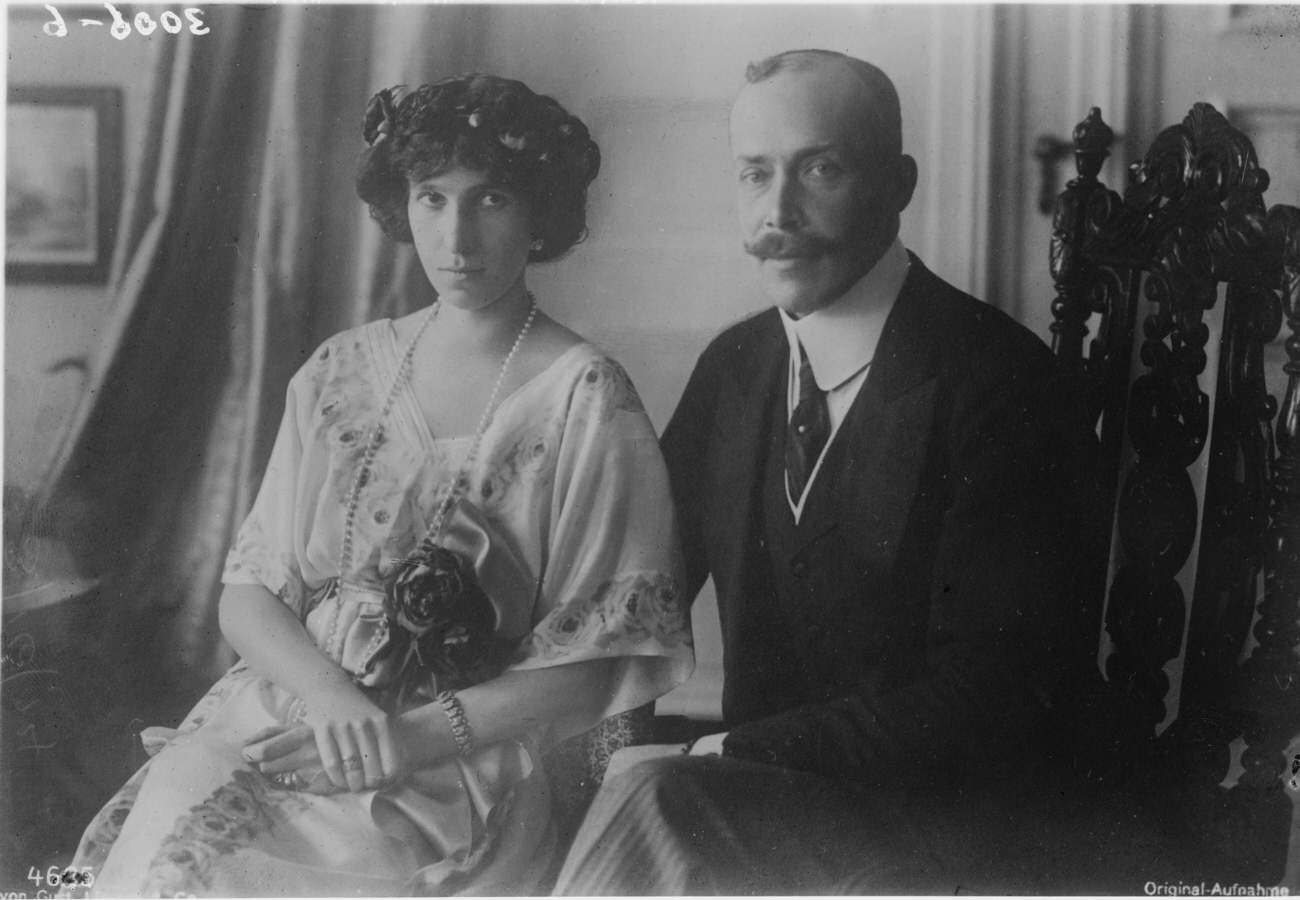
1913

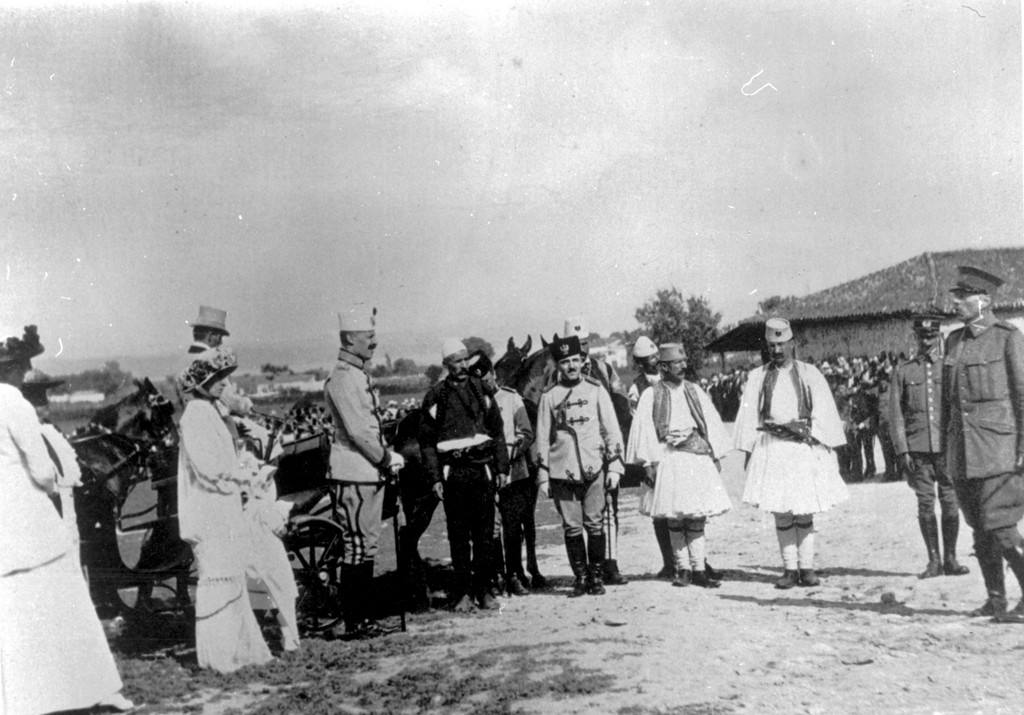
Prince Wilhelm of Wied, Isa Boletini and officers of the International Gendarmerie: Duncan Heaton-Armstrong and Colonel Thomson near Durrës in June 1914

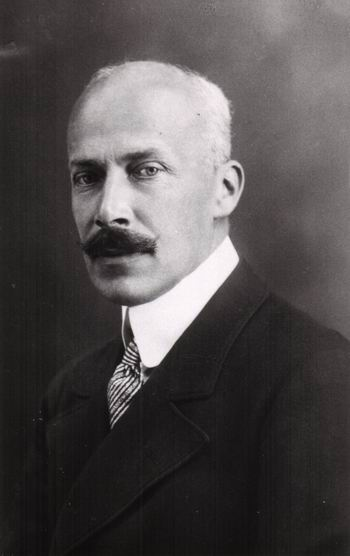
1914

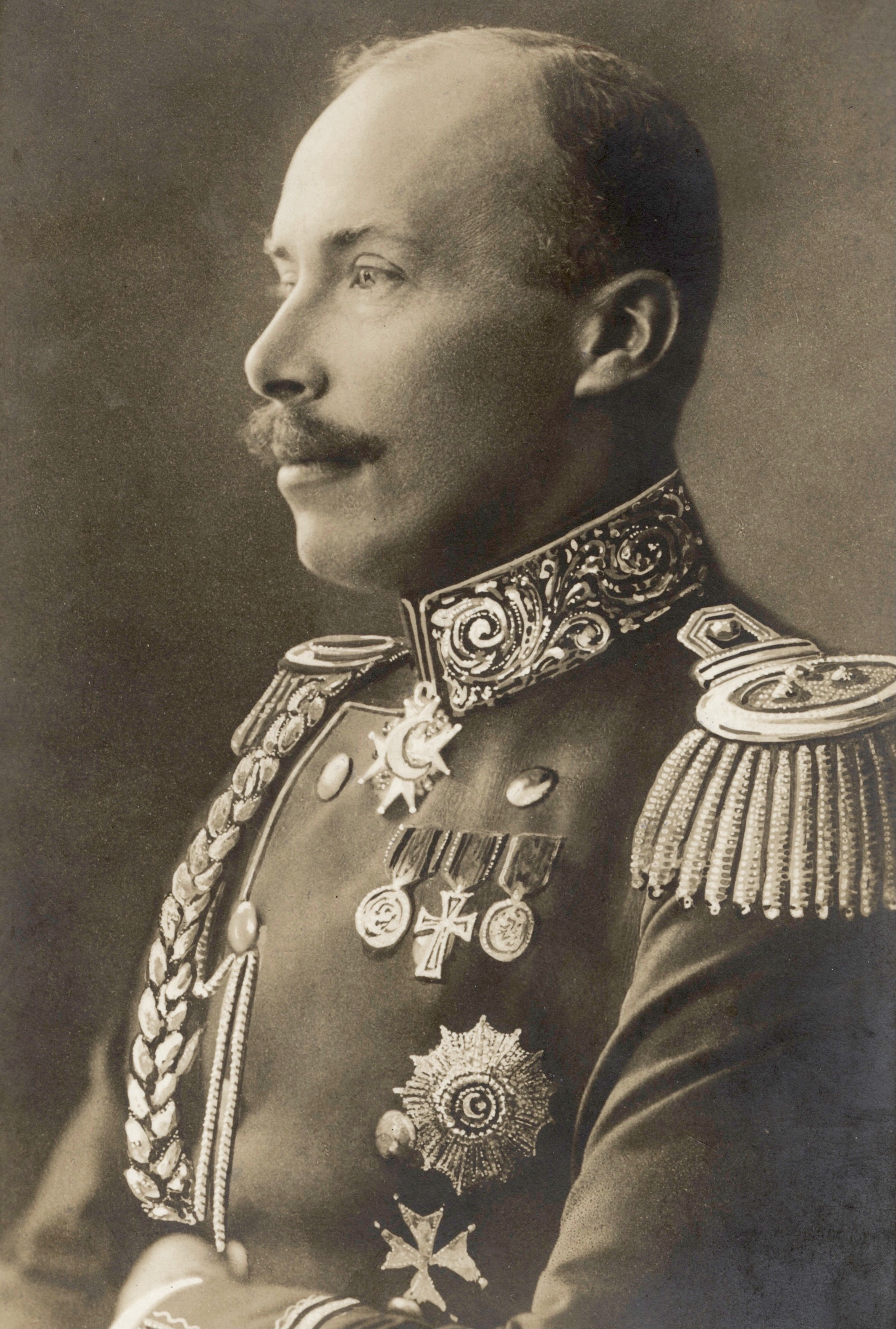
1914

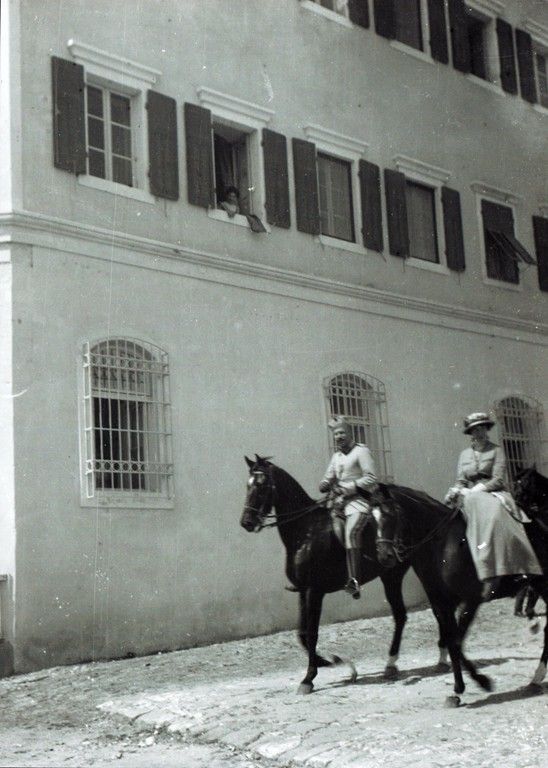
Prince Wilhelm on horseback in front of the palace in Durrës.

Royal Monogram

== Ancestry ==
Ancestors of Wilhelm, Prince of Albania

8. Johann August Karl, Prince of Wied
4. Hermann, Prince of Wied
9. Princess Sophie Auguste of Solms-Braunfels
2. William, Prince of Wied
10. William, Duke of Nassau
5. Princess Marie of Nassau
11. Princess Louise of Saxe-Hildburghausen
1. William, Prince of Albania
12. William I of the Netherlands
6. Prince Frederick of the Netherlands
13. Princess Wilhelmine of Prussia
3. Princess Marie of the Netherlands
14. Frederick William III of Prussia
7. Princess Louise of Prussia
15. Duchess Louise of Mecklenburg-Strelitz

== In popular culture ==
German circus acrobat Otto Witte claimed in the 1920s to have secretly ruled for five days as King of Albania in 1913. His story may have been inspired by the similarity of his name to Wilhelm von Wied. Witte's urban legend was used as the basis for Harry Turtledove's fantasy novel Every Inch a King (2005), whose narrator (based on Witte) makes a brief reference to "William of Weed."

Prince Wilhelm is portrayed in the 2008 Albanian film Time of the Comet (based on Ismail Kadare's novel "The dark year" (Viti i mbrapshtë), which takes place during his reign. He is played by the German actor Thomas Heinze.

== Notes ==
Wilhelm, Prince of Albania House of Wied Born: 26 March 1876 Died: 18 April 1945
Regnal titles
Preceded by Fejzi Bej Alizoti as Chairman of the Central Government	Prince of Albania; 7 March 1914 – 3 September 1914	Succeeded by Qamil Musa Haxhi Feza as Chairman of the Administrative Commission
Titles in pretence
New title	— TITULAR — Prince of Albania; 3 September 1914 – 18 April 1945	Succeeded by Carol Victor
