= Princess of Wied =

Princess of Wied may refer to:

- Elisabeth of Wied, Pauline Elisabeth Ottilie Luise zu Wied (1843–1916); Queen Consort of King Carol I of Romania, widely known by her literary name of Carmen Sylva
- Princess Sophie of Schönburg-Waldenburg (1885–1936), wife of Prince William of Wied; With her husband's accession to the Albanian throne she became the Princess of Albania
