= Sophie, Princess of Albania =

Sophie
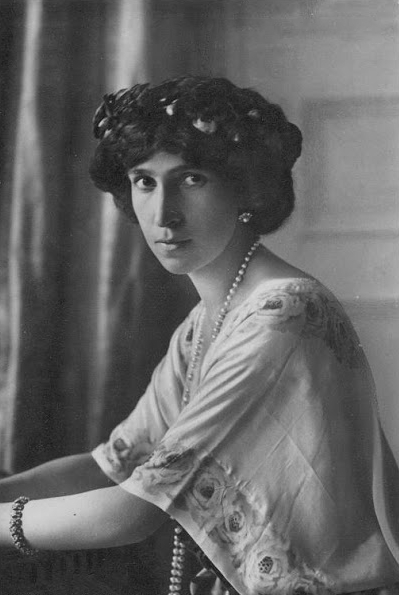
- Princess Sophie in 1914

Princess consort of Albania
- Tenure: 7 March – 3 September 1914
- Born: Princess Sophie of Schönburg-Waldenburg; 21 May 1885; Potsdam, Brandenburg, German Empire
- Died: 3 February 1936 (aged 50); Fântânele, Romania
- Spouse: Wilhelm, Prince of Albania (m. 1906)
- Issue: Marie Eleonore, Princess Alfred of Schönburg-Waldenburg; Carol Victor, Hereditary Prince of Albania
Names
- Sophie Helene Cecilie
- House: Schönburg-Waldenburg
- Father: Victor, Hereditary Prince of Schönburg-Waldenburg
- Mother: Princess Lucia of Sayn-Wittgenstein-Berleburg

Sophie (born Princess Sophie Helene Cecilie of Schönburg-Waldenburg; 21 May 1885 – 3 February 1936) was Princess of Albania from 7 March to 3 September 1914 as the wife of Prince Wilhelm. In 1906, she married Wilhelm, second son of the Prince of Wied. When her husband became prince of Albania, Sophie became princess consort. However, in Albania, she was referred to as Mbretëreshë, or Queen.

== Early life ==
Sophie Helene Cecilie was born in Potsdam, Brandenburg, German Empire, into an ancient House of Schönburg, as daughter of Hereditary Prince Otto Karl Viktor I von Schönburg-Waldenburg and his wife, Princess Lucie zu Sayn-Wittgenstein-Berleburg.

Both of Princess Sophie's parents died when she was young, so she spent much of her youth at the Castle Hemeiuș in Fântânele estate in Moldavia, which was owned by her maternal relatives.

== Marriage and issue ==
On 30 November 1906 at Waldenburg, Saxony, Princess Sophie married Prince Wilhelm of Wied, son of William, Prince of Wied, and Princess Marie of the Netherlands. He was related to Wilhelm II, German Emperor, being his second cousin. They had two children:

- Princess Marie Eleonore of Albania (19 February 1909 – 29 September 1956) ⚭ Prince Alfred of Schönburg-Waldenburg (1905-1941), son of Prince Heinrich of Schönburg-Waldenburg and Princess Olga of Löwenstein-Wertheim-Freudenberg ⚭ Ion Octavian Bunea (1899-1977)
- Carol Victor, Hereditary Prince of Albania (19 May 1913 – 8 December 1973) ⚭ Eileen de Coppet (1922-1985)

== Albanian ancestry ==
She had some remote Albanian ancestry, being a descendant of Princess Elena Callimachi, daughter of Prince Scarlat Ghica (Prince of Moldavia and Prince of Wallachia), and his wife, Princess Ruxandra Muruzi. She was also descended from Princess Ruxandra Ghica, daughter of Grigore I Ghica, Prince of Wallachia and his wife, Princess Maria Strurdza. Although officially Romanian, the Ghica Princely family had Albanian roots.

== Princess of Albania ==
Styles of Princess Sophie of Albania
- Reference style: Her Highness
- Spoken style: Your Highness

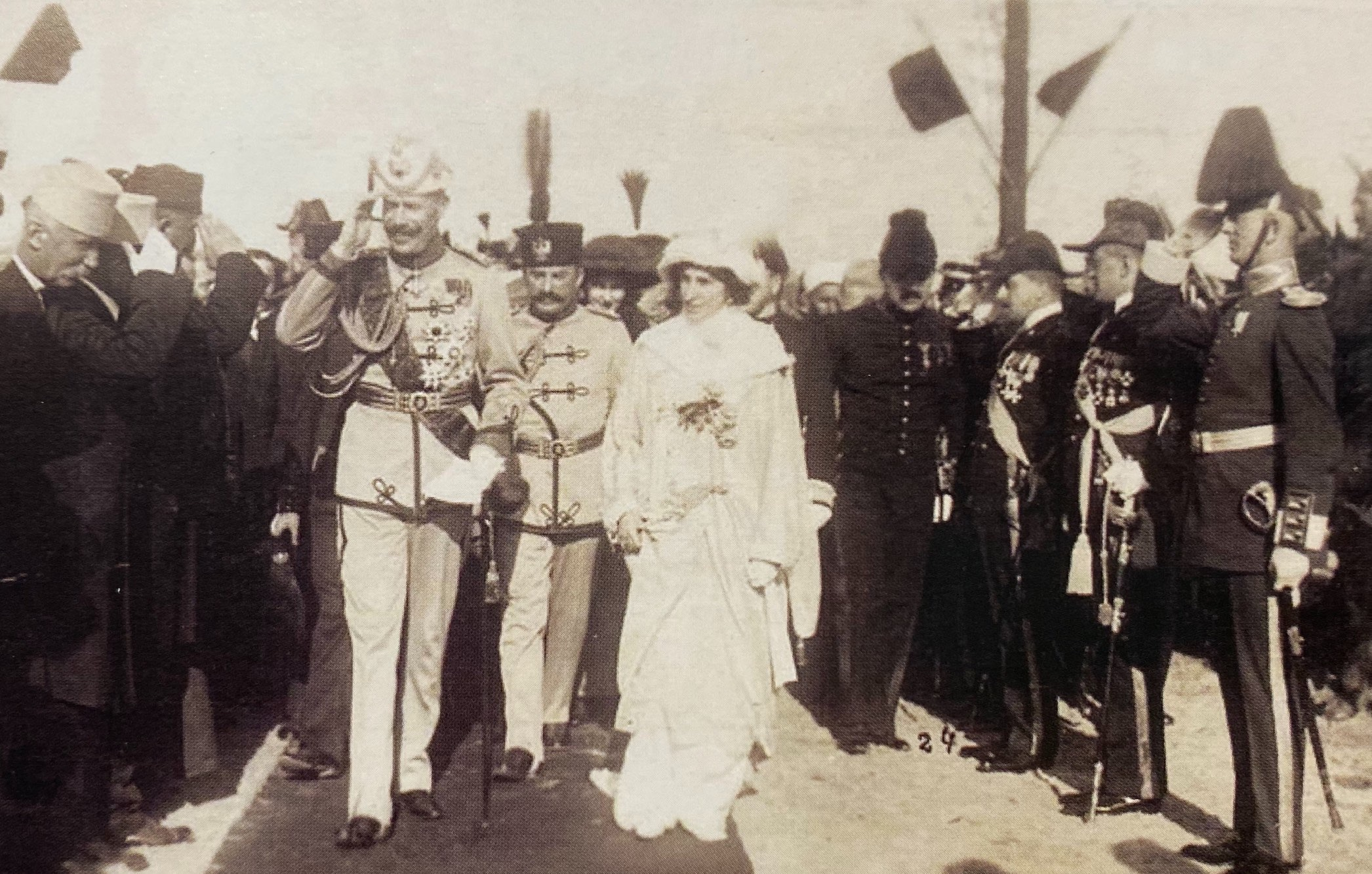
William of Albania and his wife Princess Sophie arriving in Durrës the capital of Principality of Albania, (now Albania) on 7 March 1914

Princess Sophie was close to her husband's aunt Queen Elisabeth of Romania, whom she had known since moving to Romania after the death of her parents. Princess Sophie and Queen Elisabeth sang, painted, composed and played musical instruments together. Queen Elisabeth played an important role in getting Princess Sophie's husband William on the Albanian throne by asking Take Ionescu to persuade the great powers to select William. Princess Sophie and Queen Elisabeth both worked to overcome William's reluctance to accept the throne.

Eventually William agreed, and on 21 February 1914, Prince William and Princess Sophie hosted a delegation of Albanian and Italo-Albanians notables at their castle in Neuwied, where William was formally offered the throne. The Albanian and Italo-Albanian delegation then visited Waldenburg, Saxony, where they paid their respects to Princess Sophie's family.

Sophie and her husband arrived in Albania on 7 March 1914, in Durrës, the provisional capital. Sophie and Wilhelm were not successful in Albania: they were strangers to the culture and sought to introduce habits which were normal for royalty in Europe but unknown in poor Albania. Sophie showed no interest in politics. Her representational duties and disinterest in state affairs were considered ideal for a royal consort and modelled after her mentor queen Elizabeth of Romania. Edith Durham, who met them in Durrës, described them thus:

"They are very royal – both of them [...] keep a court and keep people standing in their presence. It is all ludicrous [...] her [Sophie's] only idea is to play lady bountiful, distribute flowers, put medals on the wounded and make tiny blouses of native embroidery."

Her Albanian adventure proved short-lived. On 3 September 1914, with the country in turmoil, Princess Sophie and Prince William left Albania, never to return. However, she officially remained the Princess of Albania until 31 January 1925, when the country was declared a republic.

On 3 February 1936, Princess Sophie died at Fântânele, Romania.

== Ancestry ==
Ancestors of Sophie, Princess of Albania

8. Otto Viktor, Prince of Schönburg-Waldenburg
4. Otto, Prince of Schönburg-Waldenburg
9. Princess Thekla of Schwarzburg-Rudolstadt
2. Victor, Hereditary Prince of Schönburg-Waldenburg
10. Apollinaris Labunski
5. Pàmela Labunska
11. Iuliana Popów
1. Princess Sophie of Schönburg-Waldenburg
12. Prince August of Sayn-Wittgenstein-Berleburg
6. Prince Emil of Sayn-Wittgenstein-Berleburg
13. Franziska Allesina genannt von Schweitzer
3. Princess Lucia of Sayn-Wittgenstein-Berleburg
14. Prince Nicolae Cantacuzene
7. Princess Pulcheria Cantacuzene
15. Lucie Palladi

== See also ==
- Principality of Albania
- List of Albanian consorts

Sophie, Princess of Albania House of Schönburg-Waldenburg Cadet branch of the House of Schönburg Born: 21 May 1885 Died: 3 February 1936
Albanian royalty
New title	Princess of Albania; 7 March 1914 – 3 September 1914	Vacant Title next held by Geraldine Apponyi de Nagy-Apponyi as Queen of the Albanians
