= Hemeiuș =

- Commune
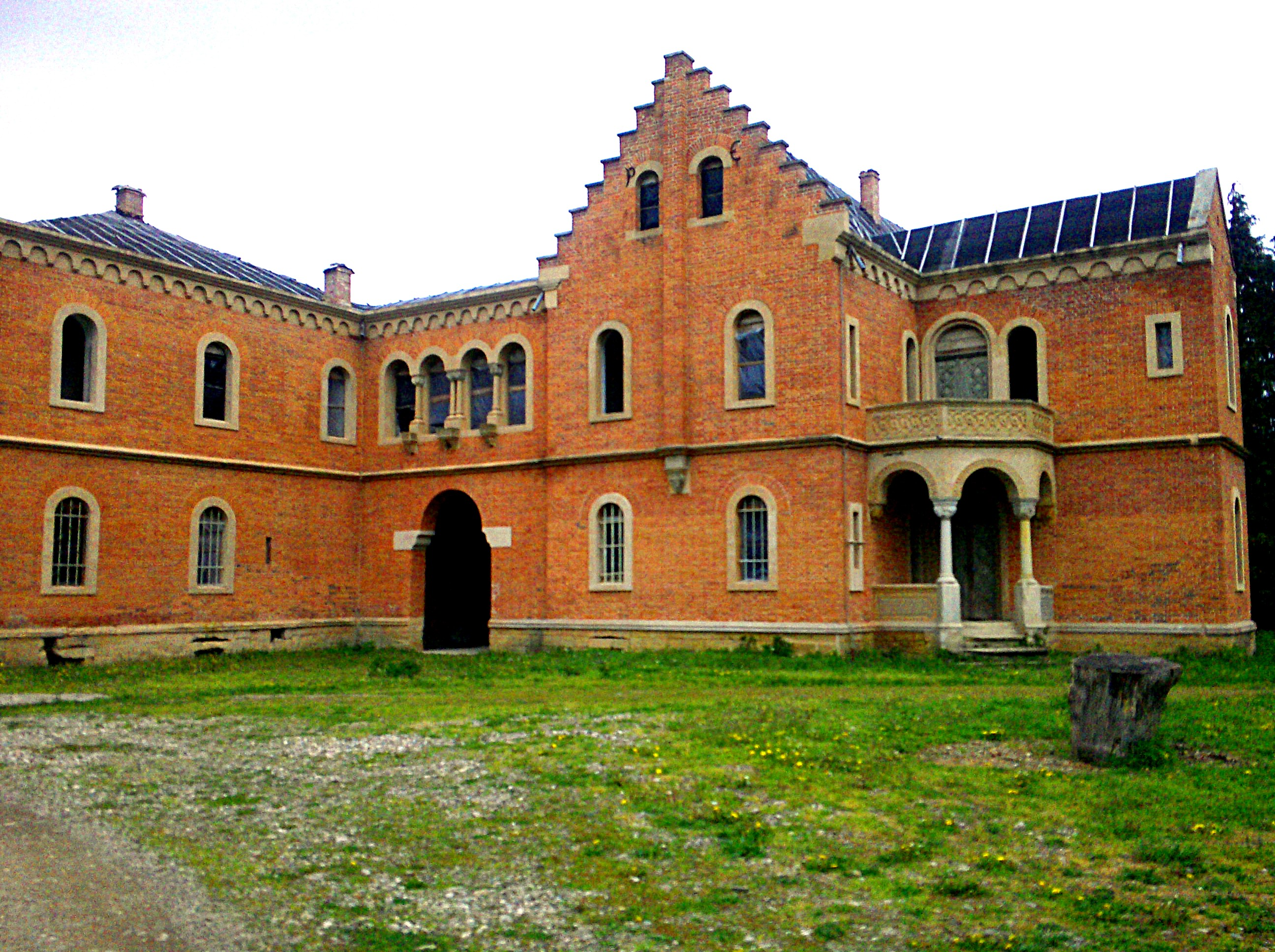
- Castle of Hemeiuș

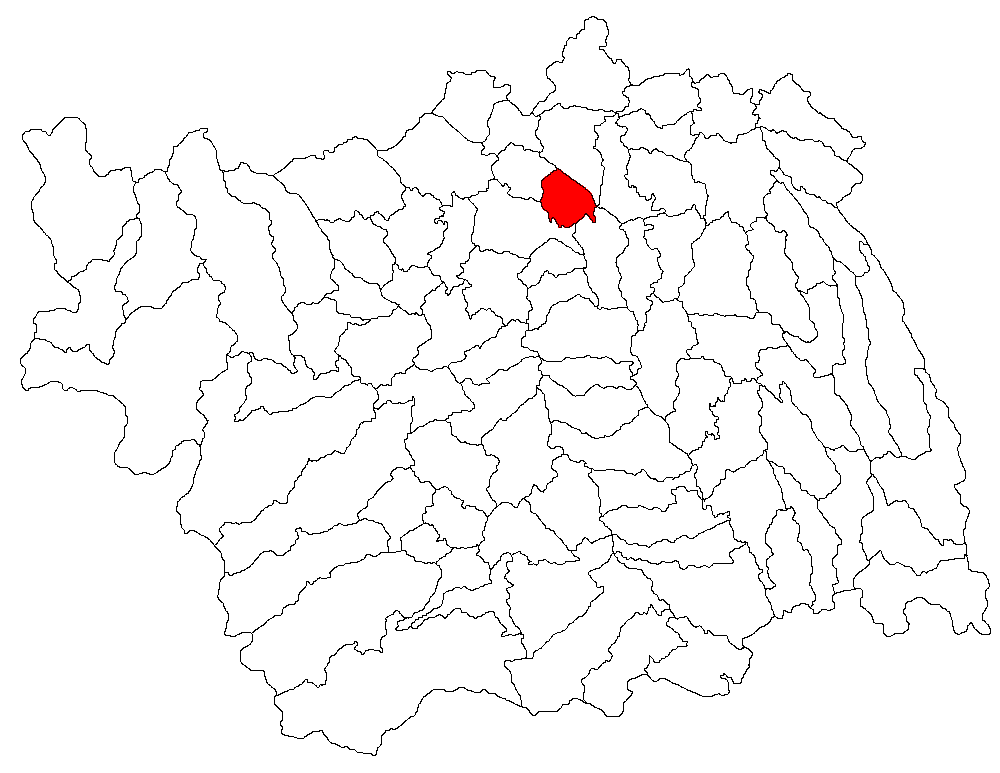
- Location in Bacău County

- Location in Romania
- Coordinates: 46°37′N 26°51′E
- Country: Romania
- County: Bacău

Government
  - Mayor (2024–2028): Constantin Sava (PNL)
- Area: 27.95 km^{2} (10.79 sq mi)
- Elevation: 176 m (577 ft)
- Population (2021-12-01): 6,523
  - Density: 233.4/km^{2} (604.5/sq mi)
- Time zone: UTC+02:00 (EET)
  - Summer (DST): UTC+03:00 (EEST)
- Postal code: 607235
- Area code: +(40) 0234
- Vehicle reg.: BC
- Website: primariahemeius.ro

Hemeiuș is a commune in Bacău County, Western Moldavia, Romania. It is composed of three villages: Fântânele, Hemeiuș, and Lilieci.

Princess Sophie of Albania died in Fântânele village in 1936.

== Natives ==
- Walter Adolph (1913–1941), German Luftwaffe military aviator in the Spanish Civil War and a fighter ace during World War II
- Ion Th. Simionescu (1873–1944), geologist, paleontologist, and naturalist
