= Hermann, Prince of Wied =

Hermann
- Prince of Wied
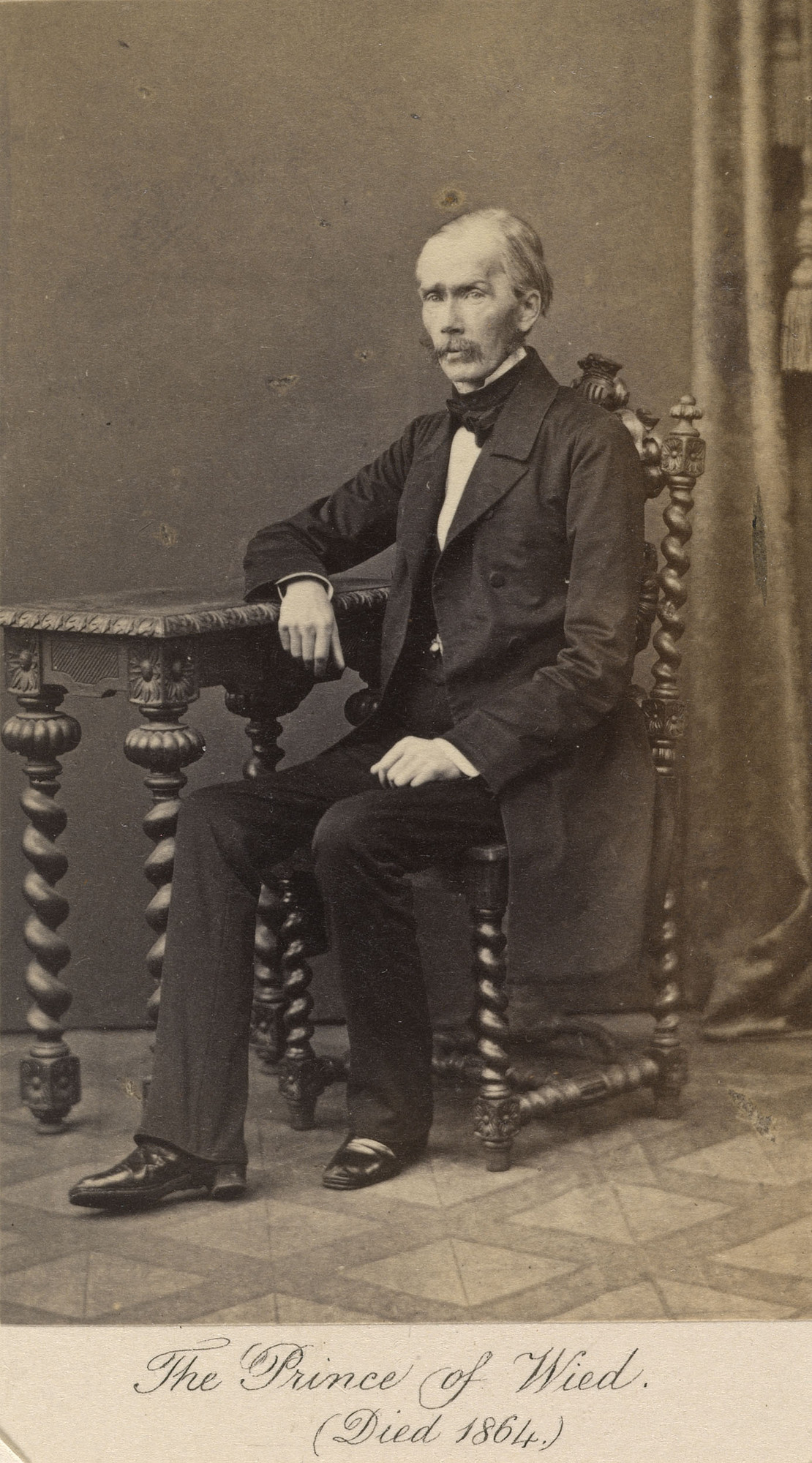
- Born: 22 May 1814; Neuwied, Duchy of Nassau
- Died: 5 March 1864 (aged 49); Neuwied, Duchy of Nassau
- Spouse: Princess Marie of Nassau (m. 1842)
- Issue: Elisabeth, Queen of Romania; William, Prince of Wied; Prince Otto
Names
- German: Wilhelm Hermann Karl
- House: Wied-Neuwied
- Father: Johann August Karl, Prince of Wied
- Mother: Princess Sophie Auguste of Solms-Braunfels

Hermann, Prince of Wied (German: Wilhelm Hermann Karl Fürst zu Wied; 22 May 1814 – 5 March 1864) was a German nobleman, elder son of Johann August Karl, Prince of Wied. He was the father of Queen Elisabeth of Romania and the paternal grandfather of William, Prince of Albania.

== Early life ==
Hermann was the second child and first son of Johann August Karl, Prince of Wied, son of Friedrich Karl, Prince of Wied and Countess Marie of Sayn-Wittgenstein-Berleburg, and his wife, Princess Sophie Auguste of Solms-Braunfels, daughter of William, Prince of Solms-Braunfels and his wife Countess Auguste of Salm-Grumbach.

== Texas ==
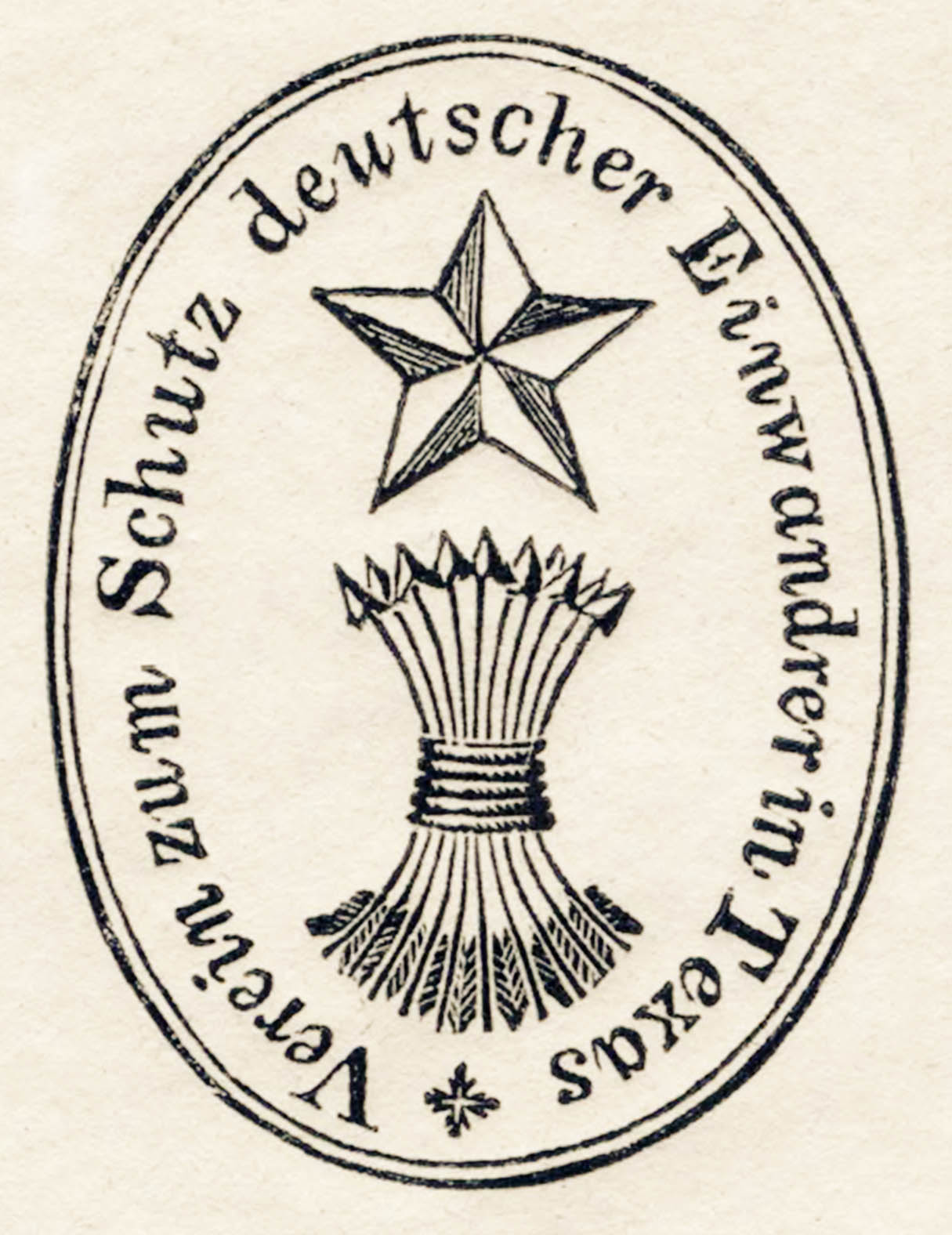
Logo of Verein zum Schutze Deutscher Einwanderer in Texas

In 1842, along with 20 other representatives of the German nobility, Prince Hermann founded the "Adelsverein, Society for the Protection of German Immigrants in Texas".

The settlement of New Wied, Texas, a few miles north of New Braunfels on the Guadalupe River located on the eastern side of Comal County, was established after more than 300 German settlers in the New Braunfels region died in the epidemic of 1846. The society also established the village of Wied, Texas in Lavaca County.

Hermann purchased a share in the society after he became engaged to the sister of Wilhelm, Duke of Nassau, the protector of the society. He took no active part in the society until 1847, when it became apparent that, because of debts and dissension, a new, more businesslike approach had to be taken in order to save the reputations and investments of the noblemen. Starting in 1847, Hermann's director of business affairs, August von Bibra became actively involved in the affairs of the Verein. When the prince was elected president of the society in 1851, following Carl, 3rd Prince of Leiningen, Bibra took over complete management of the enterprise. Bibra struggled for more than ten years to repay the Verein debts and to revitalize the emigration program.

== Marriage ==
Hermann married on 20 June 1842 in Biebrich, Princess Marie of Nassau, daughter of William, Duke of Nassau and his first wife Princess Louise of Saxe-Hildburghausen.

They had three children:

- Princess Elisabeth of Wied (29 December 1843 – 3 March 1916) married Carol I of Romania, had issue.
- William, Prince of Wied (22 August 1845 – 22 October 1907) married Princess Marie of the Netherlands, had issue.
- Prince Otto of Wied (22 November 1850 – 18 February 1862)

== Ancestry ==
Ancestors of Hermann, Prince of Wied

8. Johann Friedrich Alexander, Prince of Wied
4. Friedrich Karl, Prince of Wied
9. Burgravine Caroline of Kirchberg
2. Johann August Karl, Prince of Wied
10. Louis Ferdinand, Count of Sayn-Wittgenstein-Berleburg
5. Countess Marie of Sayn-Wittgenstein-Berleburg
11. Countess Friederike Christine of Ysenburg and Büdingen
1. Hermann, Prince of Wied
12. Ferdinand, Prince of Solms-Braunfels
6. William, Prince of Solms-Braunfels
13. Countess Sophie Christine of Solms-Laubach
3. Princess Sophie Auguste of Solms-Braunfels
14. Karl Ludwig Wild- und Rheingraf, Count of Salm-Grumbach and Dhaun
7. Countess Auguste Franziska of Salm-Grumbach
15. Princess Marianne of Leiningen

== Notes and sources ==
- Neue Deutsche Biografie (NDB), Band 3, Seite 149
- The Royal House of Stuart, London, 1969, 1971, 1976, Addington, A. C., Reference: 336

Hermann, Prince of Wied House of Wied-Neuwied Cadet branch of the House of Wied Born: 22 August 1845 Died: 22 October 1907
German nobility
Preceded by Johann August Karl	Prince of Wied; 1836–1864	Succeeded by William
