= Prince Frederick of the Netherlands =

Dutch prince (1797–1881)

Prince Frederick
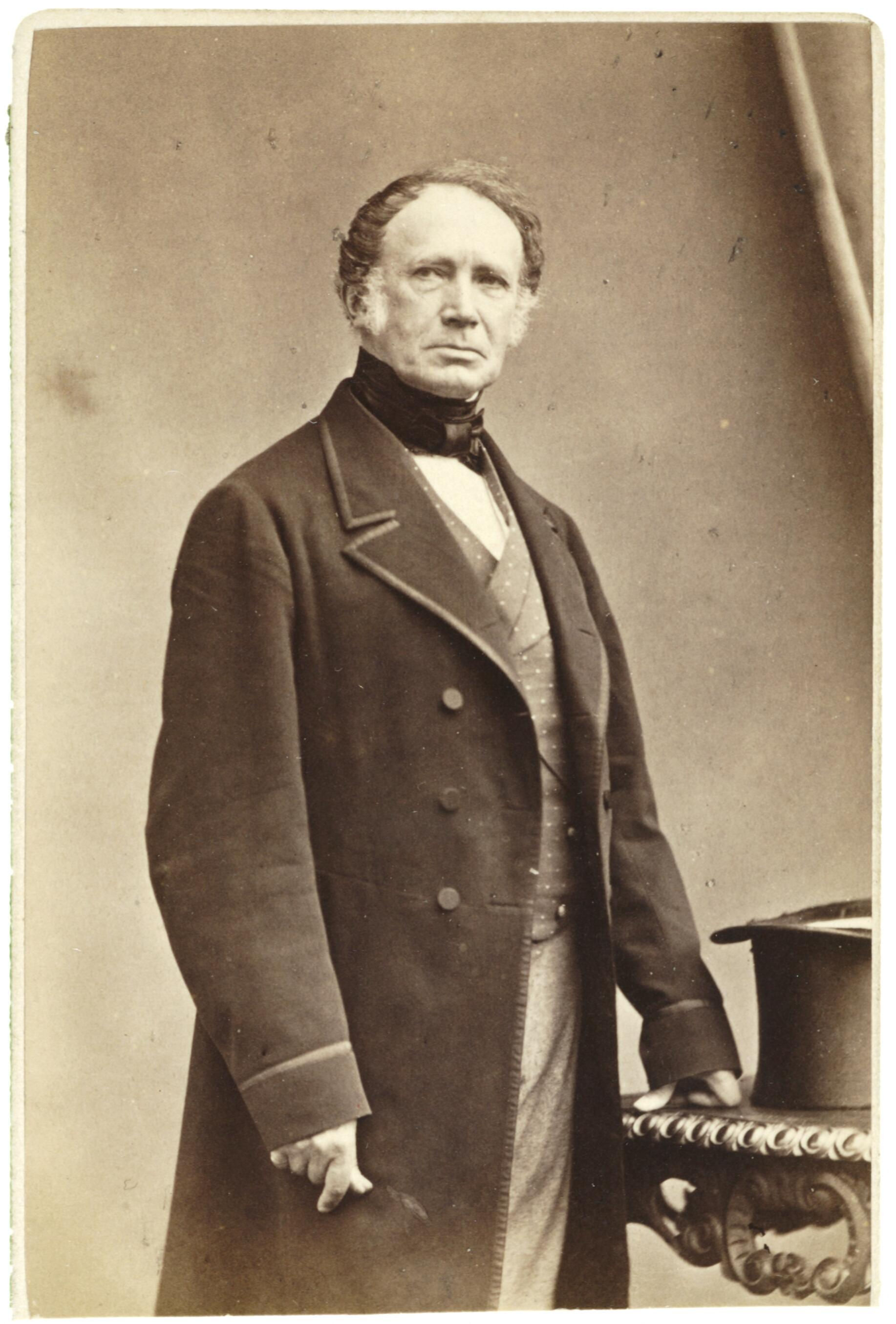
- Photograph of Prince Frederick
- Born: 28 February 1797; Berlin
- Died: 8 September 1881 (aged 84); Wassenaar
- Spouse: Princess Louise of Prussia (m. 1825; died 1870)
- Issue: Louise, Queen of Sweden and Norway; Prince Willem; Prince Frederick; Marie, Princess of Wied
- House: Orange-Nassau
- Father: William I of the Netherlands
- Mother: Wilhelmine of Prussia

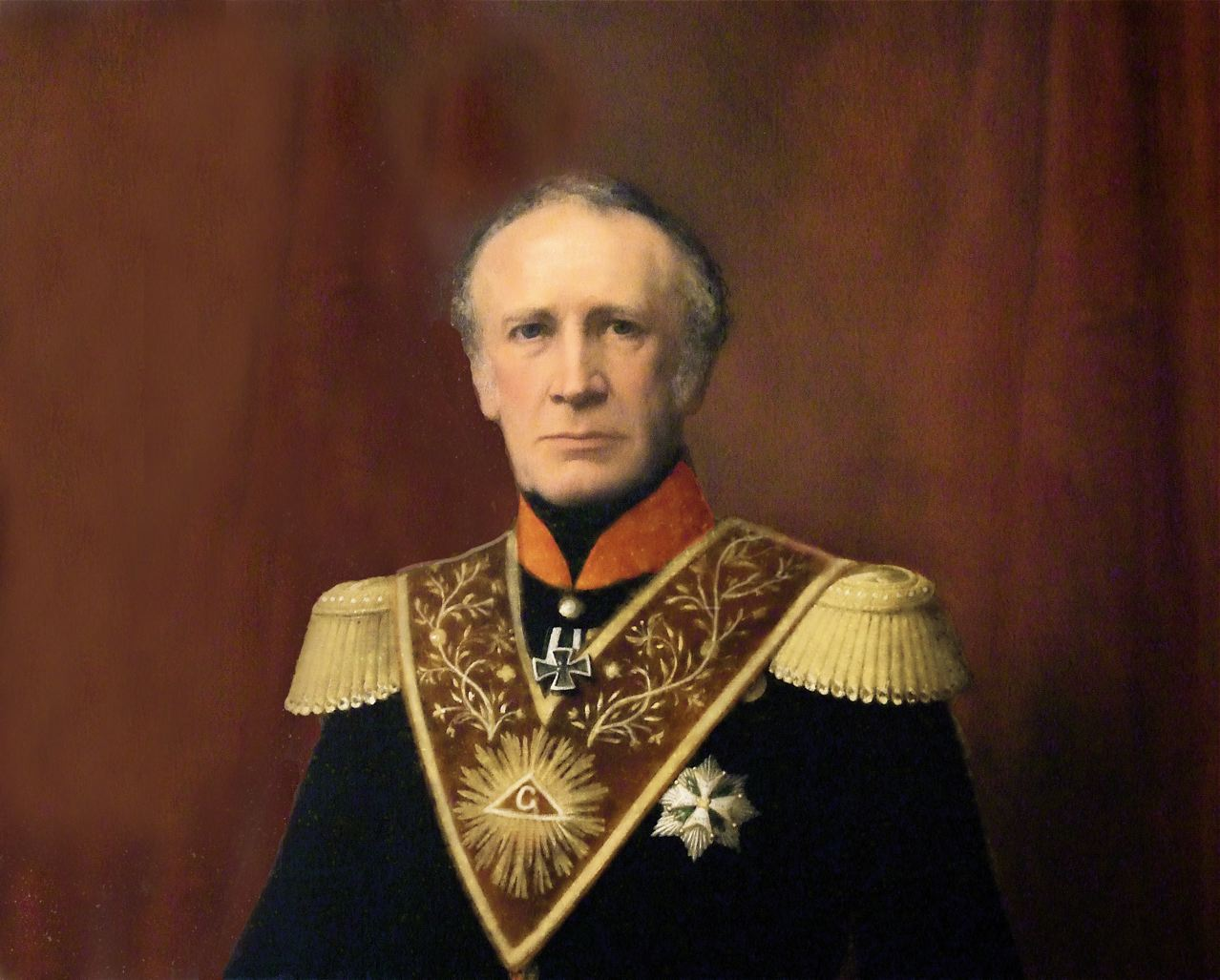
Prince Frederick in his Grand Master's regalia

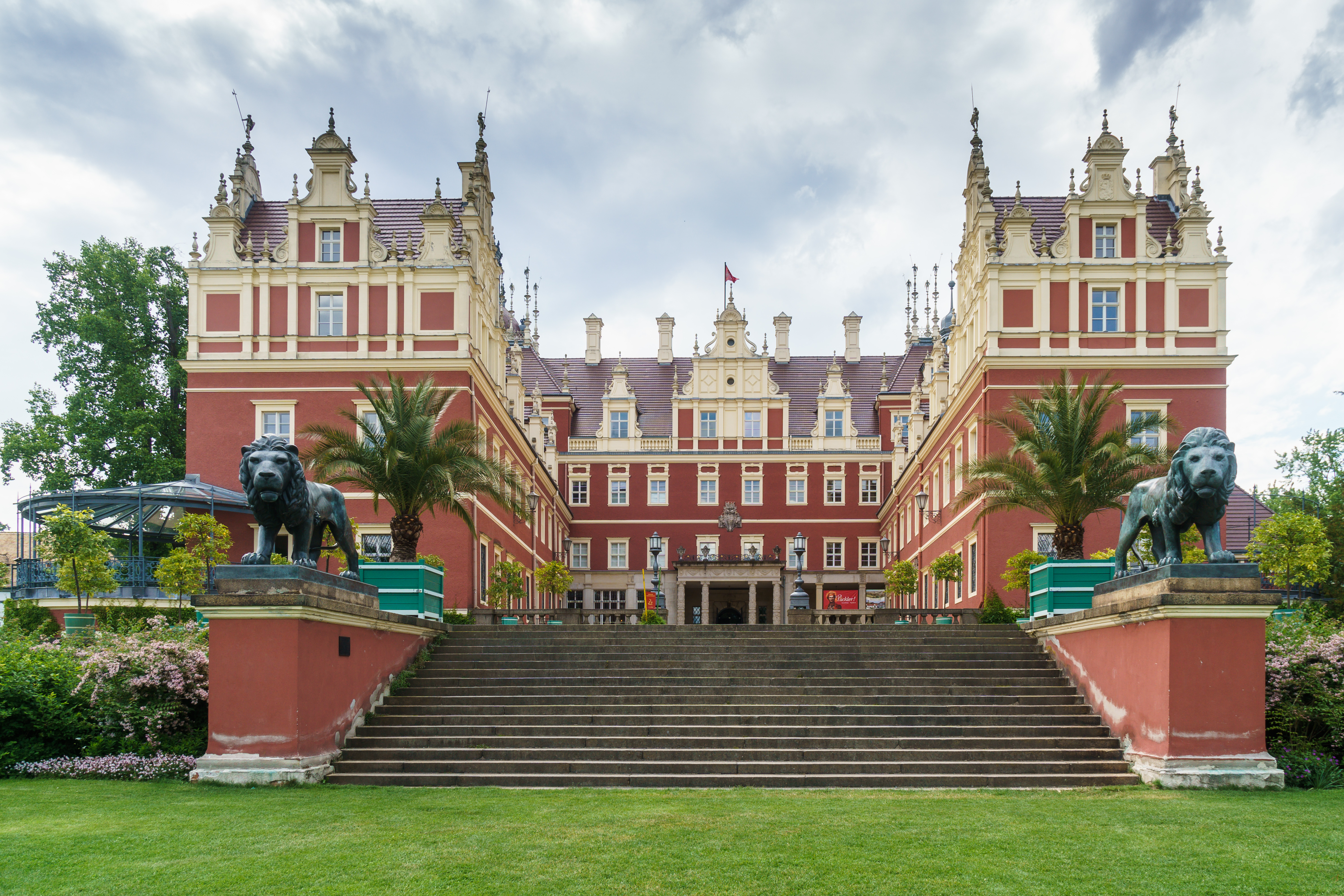
Schloss Muskau

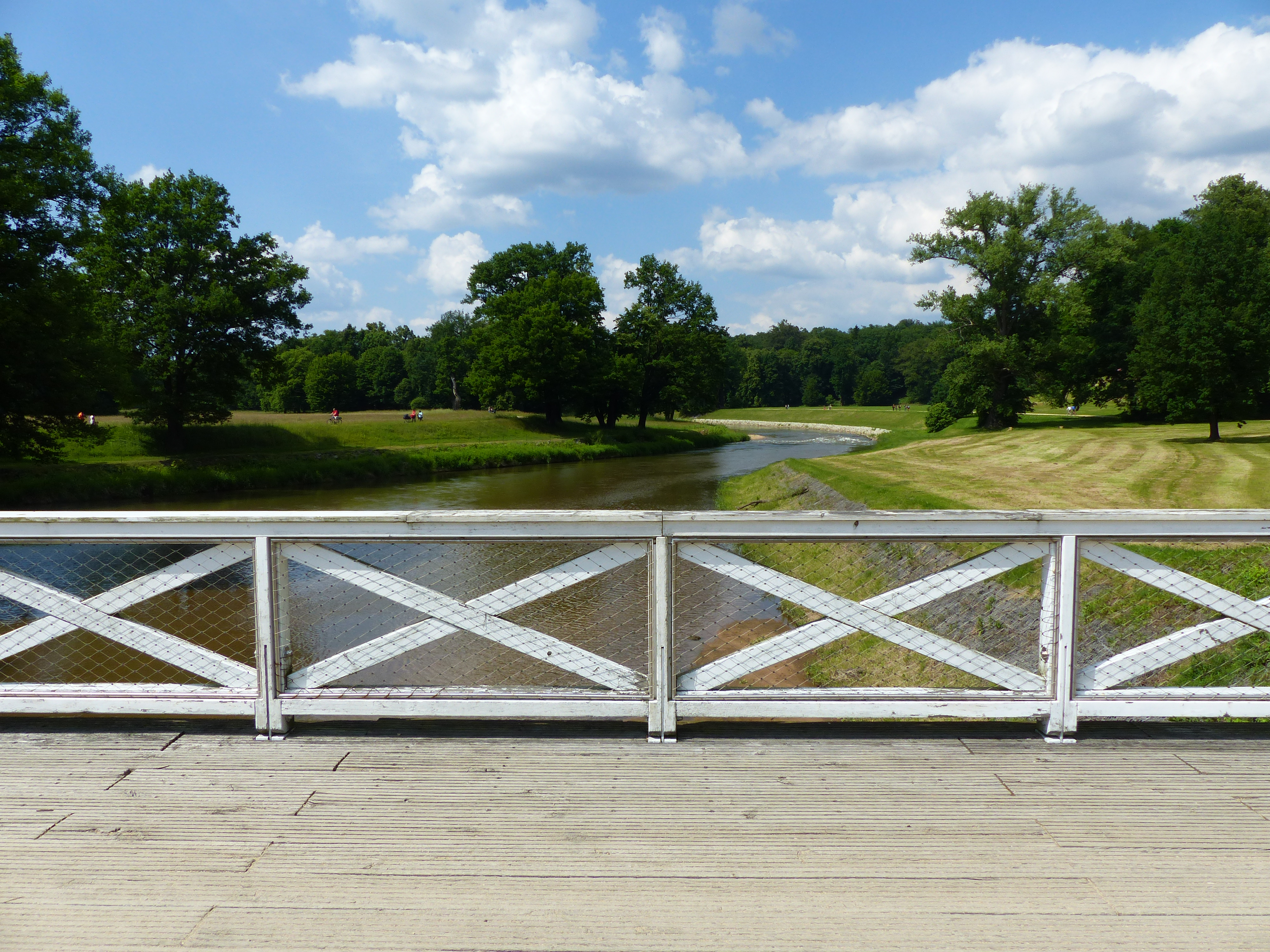
Muskau Park

Prince Frederick of the Netherlands, Prince of Orange-Nassau (full names: Willem Frederik Karel; 28 February 1797, in Berlin – 8 September 1881, in Wassenaar), was the second son of William I of the Netherlands and his wife, Wilhelmine of Prussia.

Frederick was active in the military and political life of the Netherlands. He served as Commissary-general of the Department of War and as Chief Director of War and Navy, where he modernized the army according to the Prussian model. Frederick also led the Dutch troops during the Belgian Revolution in 1830. Additionally, he was a prominent Freemason and Grand Master of the Order of Freemasons. After his active career, he withdrew to his estate and played a mediating role within the royal family.

== Early life ==
The prince grew up at the court of his grandfather Frederick William II of Prussia and uncle Frederick William III of Prussia. One of his tutors was Carl von Clausewitz. Aged 16, the prince fought in the Battle of Leipzig.

The prince first entered the Netherlands in December 1813. As he spoke no Dutch, the prince was sent to Leiden University to get a further education. He was also educated by Karl Ludwig von Phull in The Hague. When Napoleon returned from Elba, during the Hundred Days the prince was given command of a detachment of Wellington's army which was posted in a fall back position near Braine-le-Comte should the battle taking place at Waterloo be lost.

== Prince of the Netherlands ==
Based on a house treaty, Frederick was to inherit the family's German possessions upon his father's death. After the treaty of Vienna these were no longer in the possession of the family. He instead was made heir to the Grand Duchy of Luxemburg. In 1816, Frederick relinquished this claim in exchange for land in the Netherlands and the title of Prince of the Netherlands. As a further compensation he received a yearly amount of 190,000 Dutch guilders. This made him the wealthiest member of the House of Orange-Nassau. With the money he bought a large estate in Germany, which made him the largest land owner from the Netherlands.

Aged 18, Frederick was made a major-general by his father and given nominal command of the Dutch-Belgian 1st Division (lt.-gen. Stedman) that was tasked with guarding Wellington's escape route to the sea in case things had gone awry for the Anglo-Dutch army at the Battle of Waterloo. Napoleon was, however, defeated, also thanks to the other two Dutch-Belgian divisions that did fight at that battle. Fredrick then took part in the invasion of northern France that followed Napoleon's defeat

In 1816 Frederick was appointed Grand Master of the Grand Orient of the Netherlands a function he would hold until his death in 1881. In 1851 he became one of the first Honorary Members of The Grand Lodge of Scotland, alongside Oscar I of Sweden.

In 1826 Frederick was appointed Commissary-general of the Department of War. In this office, Frederick reorganized the army on a Prussian model. Frederick founded the Royal military academy in Breda and reequipped the army with modern weapons.

In 1829 Frederick was a candidate for the Greek throne, but he declined because he did not want to be king of a country whose language and traditions were foreign to him.

When the Belgian Revolution broke out in 1830, Frederick commanded the troops sent to Brussels to suppress the rebellion there. Frederick led these troops in several days of fighting in Brussels, but could not retake the city. Frederick also took part in the campaign of his brother's 1831 Ten Days' Campaign in Belgium.

When his father abdicated in 1840, Frederick withdrew from public life to his estates at Wassenaar. In 1846 he acquired Schloss Muskau in Prussia where he completed Muskau Park, the largest and one of the most famous English gardens in Central Europe, stretching along both sides of the present German–Polish border on the Lusatian Neisse. The park had been laid out from 1815 onwards at the behest of Prince Hermann von Pückler-Muskau (1785–1871). In July 2004, Muskau Park was added to the list of UNESCO World Heritage Sites.

Upon the death of his elder brother in 1849, the country was left with a large debt. Frederick managed to pay off a million guilder to Tsar Nicholas I of Russia, who was brother-in-law to William II. The new King William III of the Netherlands (Frederick's nephew) did not want to inherit the kingship from his father, but Frederick managed to convince him to take up the position, offering to assist him.

William III recalled Frederick and made him Inspector-General of the army. Frederick held that office until 1868, when he resigned because of the lack of support for his plans to modernize the army. Frederick managed to prevent a divorce between King William III and Queen Sophie of Württemberg by establishing a legal separation.

He retired to Muskau Castle, bought by him in 1846, which was remodeled in Renaissance revival style between 1863 and 1866.

Prince Frederick made his last public appearance at the christening of his great-niece Wilhelmina on 12 October 1880. He died on 8 September 1881 at the age of 84. At the time, he was the longest-lived member of the House of Orange-Nassau. This record was not broken until Juliana, who died at the age of 94.

== Marriage ==
Prince Frederick married in Berlin on 21 May 1825 his first cousin Louise, daughter of Frederick William III of Prussia. They had four children:

- Wilhelmina Frederika Alexandrine Anna Louise (5 August 1828 in The Hague – 30 March 1871 in Stockholm), married in Stockholm on 19 June 1850 to Charles XV of Sweden (3 May 1826 in Stockholm – 18 September 1872 in Malmö)
- Willem Frederik Nicolaas Karel (6 July 1833 in The Hague – 1 November 1834 in The Hague) died in infancy.
- Willem Frederik Nicolaas Albert (22 August 1836 in The Hague – 23 January 1846 in The Hague) died young at age 9.
- Wilhelmina Frederika Anna Elisabeth Marie (5 June 1841 in Huize De Paauw, Wassenaar – 22 June 1910 in Neuwied), married in Wassenaar on 18 July 1871 to William, Prince of Wied (22 August 1845 in Neuwied – 22 October 1907 in Neuwied). They were parents of William, Prince of Albania.

== Honours ==
- Netherlands: Commander of the Military William Order, 8 July 1815; Grand Cross, 18 August 1831
- Nassau: Grand Cross of the Order of Adolphe of Nassau, with Swords, June 1858
- Austrian Empire: Grand Cross of the Royal Hungarian Order of St. Stephen, 1835
- Kingdom of Hanover: Grand Cross of the Royal Guelphic Order, 1821
- Electorate of Hesse: Knight of the Order of the Golden Lion, 5 June 1851
- Oldenburg: Grand Cross of the House and Merit Order of Peter Frederick Louis, with Golden Crown, 26 July 1853
- Kingdom of Prussia:
  - Iron Cross (1813) "Honour Senior", 2nd Class, 21 October 1813
  - Knight of the Order of the Black Eagle, 10 October 1815; with Collar, 1854
  - Commander of Honour of the Johanniter Order, 1855
  - Grand Commander's Cross of the Royal House Order of Hohenzollern, 1861; with Star, 16 July 1876
- Russian Empire:
  - Knight of the Order of St. George, 4th Class, September 1813
  - Knight of the Order of St. Andrew, 22 June 1814
  - Knight of the Order of St. Alexander Nevsky, 22 June 1814
- Spain: Grand Cross of the Order of Charles III, 8 November 1817
- Sweden-Norway:
  - Knight of the Order of the Seraphim, 10 February 1850
  - Grand Cross of the Order of St. Olav, 19 June 1850
  - Knight of the Order of Charles XIII, 19 July 1852
- Württemberg: Grand Cross of the Order of the Württemberg Crown, 1849
