= William, Prince of Wied =

German army officer and politician (1845–1907)

William
- Prince of Wied
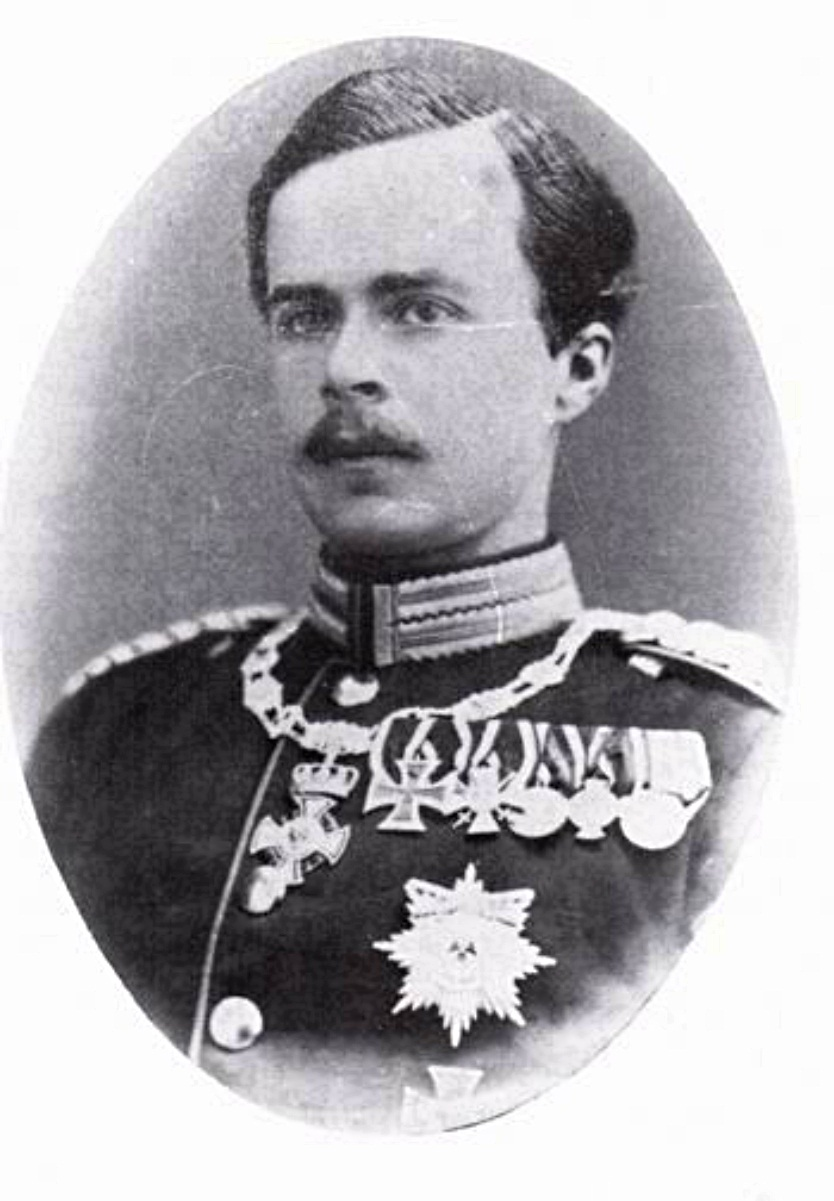
- Born: 22 August 1845; Neuwied, Duchy of Nassau
- Died: 22 October 1907 (aged 62); Neuwied, Kingdom of Prussia
- Spouse: Princess Marie of the Netherlands (m. 1871)
- Issue: Friedrich, Prince of Wied; Prince Alexander; Wilhelm, Prince of Albania; Prince Victor; Princess Louise; Princess Elisabeth
Names
- German: Wilhelm Adolph Maximilian Carl
- House: Wied-Neuwied
- Father: Hermann, Prince of Wied
- Mother: Princess Marie of Nassau

William V, Prince of Wied (German: Wilhelm Adolph Maximilian Karl Fürst von Wied; 22 August 1845 – 22 October 1907) was a German army officer and politician, elder son of Hermann, Prince of Wied. He was the father of William, Prince of Albania and brother of Queen Elisabeth of Romania. By birth he was a member of the House of Wied.

== Early life ==
William was the second child and first son of Hermann, Prince of Wied (1814–1864), son of Johann August Karl, Prince of Wied (1779-1836) and Princess Sophie Auguste of Solms-Braunfels (1796-1855), and his wife, Princess Marie of Nassau (1825–1902), daughter of William, Duke of Nassau and his first wife, Princess Louise of Saxe-Hildburghausen. Through his mother he was descendant of William IV Stadtholder of the Netherlands and George II of Great Britain.

== Military career ==
During the Austro-Prussian War in 1866, he was a lieutenant general staff of the 2nd Army. During 1870-71 he attended Franco-Prussian War.

Between 1893 and 1897 he was the Imperial commissioner and military Chief of volunteer nurses in the army. In 1893 he was appointed as General of Infantry à la suite.

== Politics ==
Politically, William was a supporter of colonial policy. Between 1891 and 1892 he was chairman of the German anti-slavery committees. This funded include expeditions to unexplored areas in Africa. Since 1897, he was a member of the Colonial Council. William was co-founder and from 1898 to 1901 President of the Navy League.

Between 1875 and 1886 he was Marshal of Rhine Province parliament. He was from 1888 to 1894 and from 1899 to 1901 Chairman of the Rhine Province parliament. Since 1878, he was a member of the Prussian House of Lords. Which he was president from 1897 to 1904.

== Marriage ==
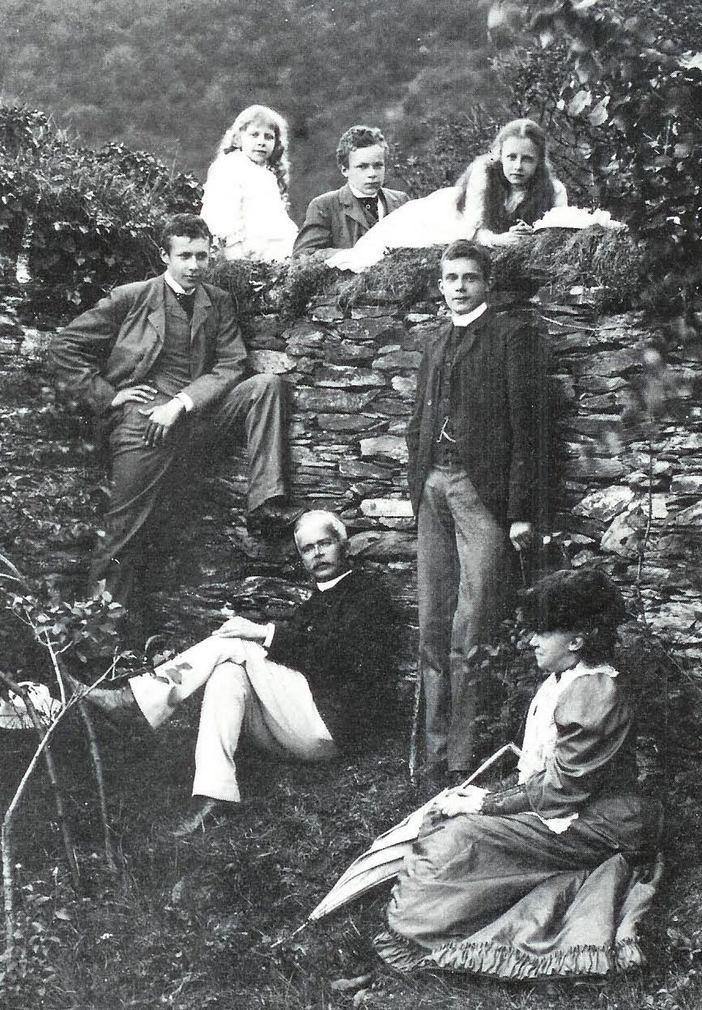
Prince William with his family, (c. 1890)

William married on 18 July 1871 in Wassenaar, Princess Marie of the Netherlands, member of the House of Orange-Nassau, younger daughter of Prince Frederick of the Netherlands, second son of William I of the Netherlands, and Princess Louise of Prussia, the youngest daughter of Frederick William III of Prussia.

They had six children:

- Friedrich, Prince of Wied (27 June 1872 – 18 June 1945) married Princess Pauline of Württemberg (1877–1965), had issue.
- Prince Alexander of Wied (28 May 1874 – 15 January 1877)
- Wilhelm, Prince of Albania (26 March 1876 – 18 April 1945) married Princess Sophie of Schönburg-Waldenburg (1885–1936), had issue.
- Prince Victor of Wied (7 December 1877 – 1 March 1946) married Countess Gisela of Solms-Wildenfels (30 December 1891, Wildenfels, Germany – 20 August 1976, Oberammergau, Germany) on 6 June 1912, had issue:
  - Marie Elisabeth of Wied (14 March 1913 - 30 March 1985, Augsburg, Germany)
  - Benigna Viktoria of Wied (23 July 1918 - 1972). Married Ernst Hartmann, Baron of Schlotheim (27 December 1914, Wiesbaden, Germany - 31 October 1952, Wiesbaden, Germany) on 19 December 1939. They had two daughters:
    - Viktoria Elisabeth, Baroness of Schlotheim (b. 11 April 1948, Wiesbaden, Germany)
    - Christine, Baroness of Schlotheim (b. 22 July 1950, Wiesbaden, Germany)
- Princess Louise of Wied (24 October 1880 – 29 August 1965)
- Princess Elisabeth of Wied (28 January 1883 – 14 November 1938)

== Honours ==
He received the following orders and decorations:

- Kingdom of Prussia:
  - Knight of the Red Eagle, 3rd Class with Swords, 1866; Grand Cross with Swords on Ring, 26 June 1876 with Collar, 18 May 1891
  - Grand Commander's Cross of the Royal House Order of Hohenzollern, 1872; with Star, 23 September 1884
  - Knight of the Royal Crown Order, 1st Class with Enamel Band of the Red Eagle Order and Swords on Ring, 23 July 1874
  - Iron Cross (1870), 1st Class
  - Service Award Cross
  - Knight of Honour of the Johanniter Order, 12 February 1885; Knight of Justice, 1896
  - Knight of the Black Eagle, 18 July 1896; with Collar, 18 January 1897
- Hohenzollern: Cross of Honour of the Princely House Order of Hohenzollern, 1st Class
- (Saxe-Coburg and Gotha) (Duchy of Saxe-Altenburg) (Saxe-Meiningen) Ernestine duchies: Grand Cross of the Saxe-Ernestine House Order, 1871; with Swords
- Mecklenburg: Grand Cross of the Wendish Crown, with Crown in Ore
- Netherlands:
  - Knight of the Military William Order, 3rd Class, 31 August 1878
  - Grand Cross of the Netherlands Lion
- Luxembourg:
  - Knight of the Gold Lion of Nassau
  - Grand Cross of the Oak Crown
- Kingdom of Romania: Grand Cross of the Star of Romania
- Saxe-Weimar-Eisenach: Grand Cross of the White Falcon, 1898
- Schaumburg-Lippe: Military Merit Medal
- Sweden-Norway:
  - Grand Cross of St. Olav, 15 April 1871
  - Knight of the Seraphim, 18 September 1896
- United Kingdom: Honorary Grand Cross of the Royal Victorian Order, 10 February 1904
- Württemberg: Grand Cross of the Württemberg Crown, 1898

== Ancestry ==
Ancestors of William, Prince of Wied

8. Friedrich Karl, Prince of Wied
4. Johann August Karl, Prince of Wied
9. Countess Marie of Sayn-Wittgenstein-Berleburg
2. Hermann, Prince of Wied
10. Wilhelm, Prince of Solms-Braunfels
5. Princess Sophie Auguste of Solms-Braunfels
11. Countess Auguste Franziska of Salm-Grumbach
1. William, Prince of Wied
12. Frederick William, Prince of Nassau-Weilburg
6. William, Duke of Nassau
13. Burgravine Louise Isabelle of Kirchberg
3. Princess Marie of Nassau
14. Frederick, Duke of Saxe-Altenburg
7. Princess Louise of Saxe-Hildburghausen
15. Duchess Charlotte Georgine of Mecklenburg-Strelitz

== Notes and sources ==
- The Royal House of Stuart, London, 1969, 1971, 1976, Addington, A. C., Reference: 336

Specific

William, Prince of Wied House of Wied-Neuwied Cadet branch of the House of Wied Born: 22 August 1845 Died: 22 October 1907
German nobility
Preceded by Hermann	Prince of Wied; 1864–1907	Succeeded by William Frederick
