= Eileen de Coppet, Princess of Albania =

Eileen Johnston
- Hereditary Princess of Albania
- Born: 3 September 1922; Chester, England, United Kingdom
- Died: 1 September 1985 (aged 62); New York City, United States
- Spouse: André de Coppet (m. 1943; died 1953) Carol Victor, Hereditary Prince of Albania (m. 1966; died 1973)
- House: Wied-Neuwied (by marriage)
- Father: George Johnston
- Mother: Alice Percival

Princess Eileen of Wied, Hereditary Princess of Albania (2 September 1922 – 1 September 1985), was an Englishwoman who became the wife of Carol Victor, Hereditary Prince of Albania.

Princess Eileen was born in Chester, England, daughter of George Johnston, a landscape gardener, and Alice (née Percival).

== Marriages and death ==
She was married twice, being widowed on both occasions. Her first marriage was to Swiss-American Captain André de Coppet (1892 - 1953), DSC, late of the US army on 6 November 1943 in New York City. They had no children. In 1953, Eileen was widowed for the first time when André died in Lausanne, Switzerland on 1 August 1953.

She married Carol Victor on 8 September 1966 in New York City. They later moved to England, and lived in Cheyne Walk, Chelsea, London. In 1973, Eileen was widowed for a second time when Carol Victor died at Munich, Bavaria, on 8 December 1973 (buried Neuwied am Rhein). The house became extinct on his death as he had no children, and no arrangements had been put in place for a successor.

Princess Eileen died in New York on 1 September 1985.

== Notes and sources ==
- Genealogisches Handbuch des Adels, Fürstliche Häuser, Reference: 1991 2
