= Princess Marie of Nassau =

Princess Marie
- Princess of Wied
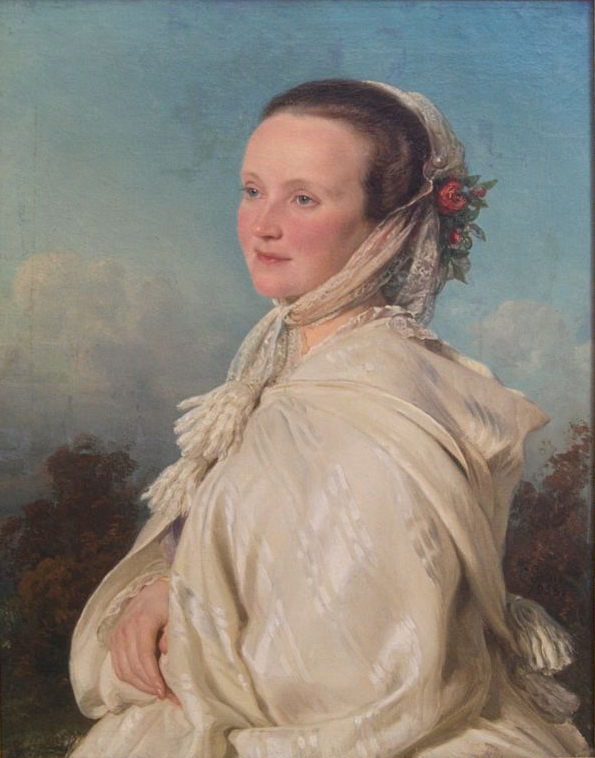
- 1858 portrait
- Born: 29 January 1825; Biebrich, Duchy of Nassau
- Died: 24 March 1902 (aged 77); Neuwied, Province of Hesse-Nassau, Kingdom of Prussia, German Empire
- Spouse: Hermann, Prince of Wied (m. 1842; died 1864)
- Issue: Elisabeth, Queen of Romania; William, Prince of Wied; Prince Otto
Names
- German: Marie Wilhelmine Friederike Elisabeth
- House: Nassau-Weilburg
- Father: William, Duke of Nassau
- Mother: Princess Louise of Saxe-Hildburghausen

Princess Marie of Nassau (German: Prinzessin Marie Wilhelmine Friederike Elisabeth von Nassau; 29 January 1825 – 24 March 1902) was the eighth child and fourth daughter of William, Duke of Nassau and wife of Hermann, 4th Prince of Wied. She was the mother of Queen Elisabeth of Romania.

== Early life ==
Marie was born at Biebrich, Duchy of Nassau, the eighth child and fourth daughter of William, Duke of Nassau and his first wife, Princess Louise of Saxe-Hildburghausen, daughter of Frederick, Duke of Saxe-Altenburg.

She was sister of:

- Duchess Therese of Oldenburg (1815–1871)
- Adolphe, Grand Duke of Luxembourg (1817–1905)

And half-sister (as well as first cousin once removed) of:

- Helena, Princess of Waldeck and Pyrmont (1831–1888) who married George Victor, Prince of Waldeck and Pyrmont.
- Queen Sophia of Sweden and Norway (1836–1913), queen consort of Oscar II of Sweden.

== Marriage and family ==
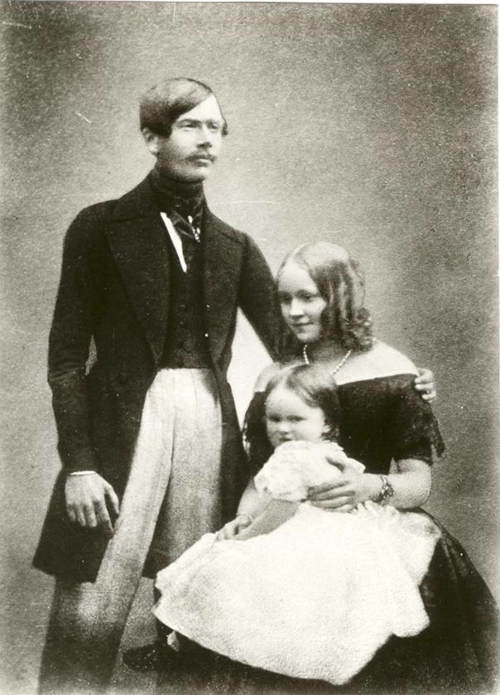
Marie with her husband Hermann and their daughter Elisabeth, 1845

Marie married on 20 June 1842 in Biebrich, Hermann, Prince of Wied, elder son of Johann August Carl, Prince of Wied and Princess Sophie Auguste of Solms-Braunfels. They had three children:

- Princess Elisabeth of Wied (29 December 1843 – 3 March 1916) married Carol I of Romania, had issue.
- William, Prince of Wied (22 August 1845 – 22 October 1907) married Princess Marie of the Netherlands, had issue.
- Prince Otto of Wied (22 November 1850 – 18 February 1862)

== Private life ==
According to the German writer and socialite Marie von Bunsen, Princess Marie is reported to have had a relationship with the Baden politician Franz von Roggenbach, to whom she even might have been married morganatically after her husband's death.

== Notes and sources ==
- The Royal House of Stuart, London, 1969, 1971, 1976, Addington, A. C., Reference: 351; The Royal House of Stuart, London, 1969, 1971, 1976, Addington, A. C., Reference: page 336
- L'Allemagne dynastique, Huberty, Giraud, Magdelaine, Reference: vol III page 454.
