= Princess Louise of Prussia (1808–1870) =

Louise of Prussia
- Princess Frederick of the Netherlands
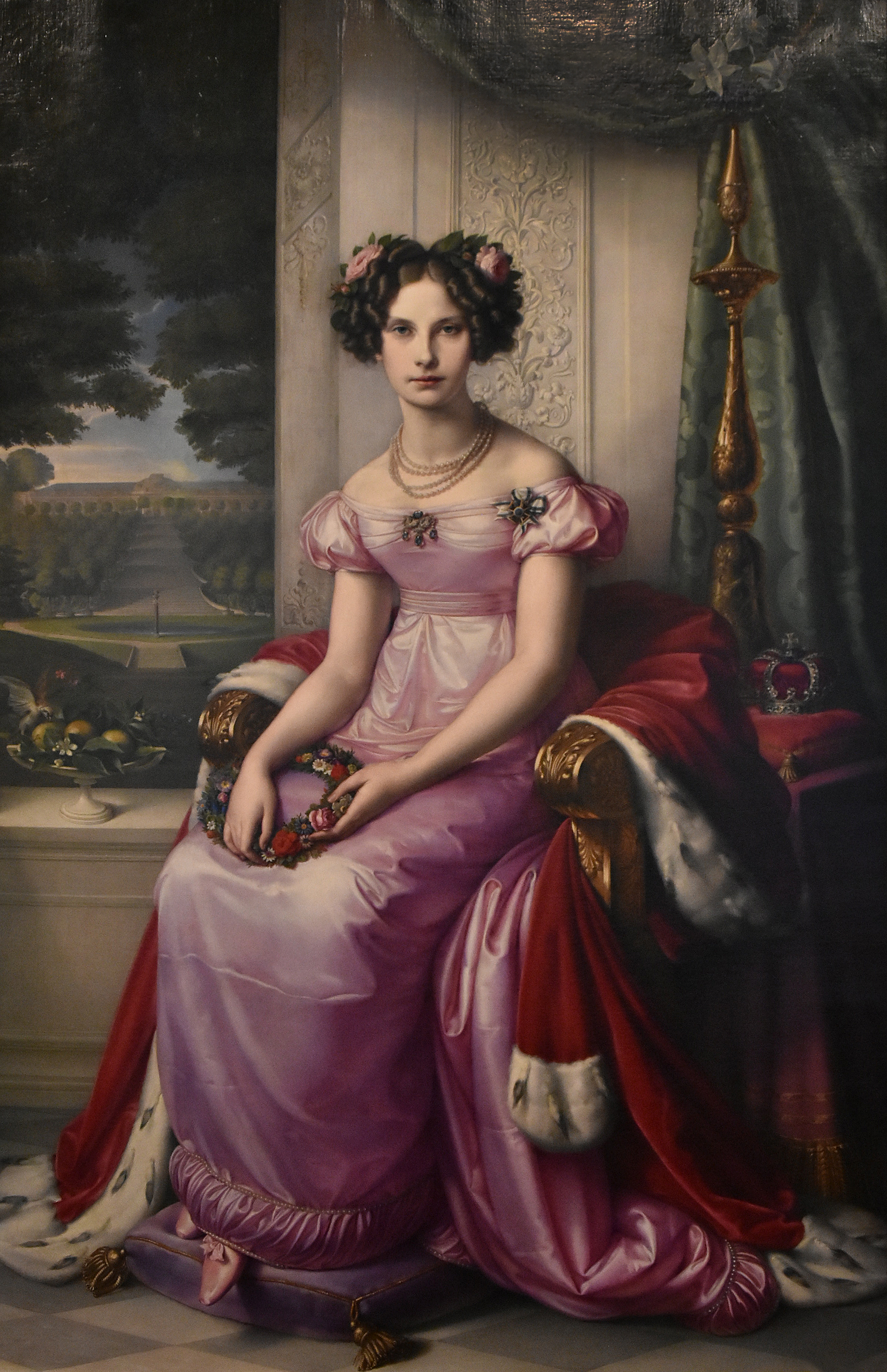
- Born: 1 February 1808; Kingdom of Prussia
- Died: 6 December 1870 (aged 62); Pauw Haus, Wassenaar, Netherlands
- Spouse: Prince Frederick of the Netherlands (m. 1825)
- Issue: Louise, Queen of Sweden and Norway; Prince Willem; Prince Frederick; Marie, Princess of Wied
Names
- German: Luise Auguste Wilhelmine Amalie; Louise Augusta Wilhelmina Amelia
- House: Hohenzollern
- Father: Frederick William III of Prussia
- Mother: Louise of Mecklenburg-Strelitz

Princess Louise of Prussia (Luise Auguste Wilhelmine Amalie; 1 February 1808 – 6 December 1870) was a princess of the Netherlands as the wife of Prince Frederick.

She was born the penultimate child of King Frederick William III of Prussia by his first wife, Queen Louise.

Although Princess Louise played a minor role in royal society, she helped establish the Luisestiftelsen—a charity organisation built for orphans—and pitched ideas for the construction of a residential home in Passow.

== Biography ==
Born on 1 February 1808, Princess Louise was the eighth child and youngest daughter of King Frederick William III of Prussia and Queen Louise.

Her siblings included King Frederick William IV of Prussia, Kaiser Wilhelm I of Germany, Empress Charlotte of Russia (wife of Czar Nicholas I) and Alexandrine, Grand Duchess of Mecklenburg-Schwerin.

Louise's grand-aunt was Charlotte, Queen of Great Britain, and two of Louise's aunts were married to two sons of the British monarch: her father's sister was Frederica, Duchess of York and her mother's sister was Frederica, Queen of Hanover.

=== Marriage ===
Since a young age, it was decided that Princess Louise would marry her first cousin, Prince Frederick of the Netherlands, who was her father's sister's son.

Similarly, it had also been decided that Louise's brother Albert would marry Frederick's sister Marianne.

Louise and Frederick had known each other since childhood because they were first cousins, and Frederick used to make frequent and prolonged visits to his uncle's court in Berlin. The pair quickly became engaged in 1823, and were married on 21 May 1825 in Berlin.

They had four children:

- Wilhelmina Frederika Alexandrine Anna Louise (5 August 1828 – 30 March 1871), married to Charles XV of Sweden. They were the parents of Louise of Sweden
- Willem Frederik Nicolaas Karel (6 July 1833 in The Hague – 1 November 1834 in The Hague), died in infancy
- Willem Frederik Nicolaas Albert (22 August 1836 in The Hague – 23 January 1846 in The Hague), died in childhood
- Wilhelmina Frederika Anna Elisabeth Marie (5 July 1841 in Paauw Haus, Wassenaar - 22 June 1910 in Neuwied), married in Wassenaar on 18 July 1871 to William, Prince of Wied (1845–1907). They were the parents of William, Prince of Albania.

=== Later life ===
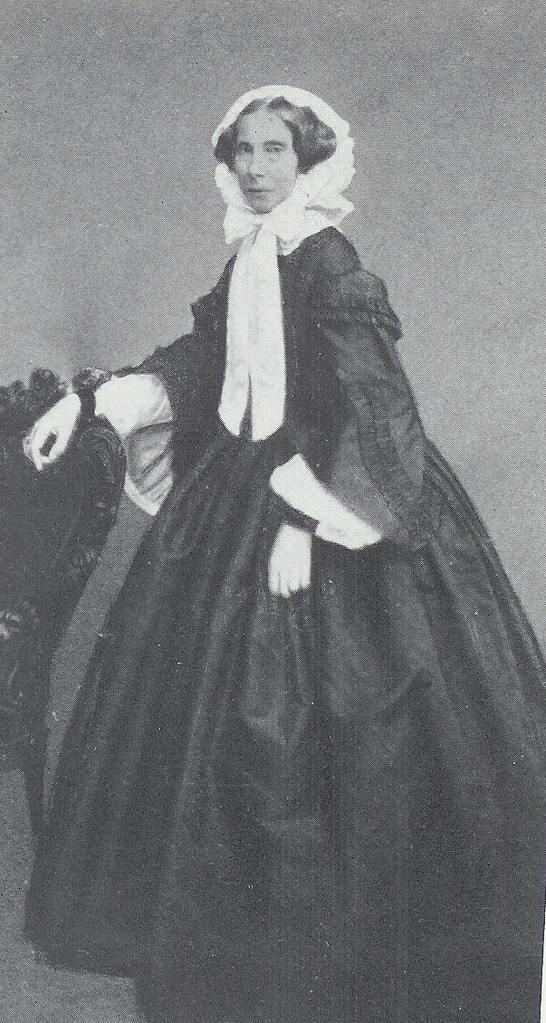
Princess Louise in her later years

Princess Louise and Prince Frederick lived in The Hague, first at Korte Voorhout, and from 1838 onward, in Wassenaar. Louise played no dominant public role but shared her husband's spotless reputation in the eyes of the public. She is described as having had a strong closeness to her extended family, with whom she corresponded, and often visited her relatives and eventually also her children abroad, when they left the Netherlands after their marriages. Her correspondence with her children and relatives is considered a valuable source of contemporary court life in the Netherlands, Sweden and Russia. While there is no information as to whether she tried to participate in politics or not, she was strongly Pro-Prussian, and her views caused a conflict between her and queen Sophie during the Franco-Prussian War of 1870. Louise and her husband both contributed ideas for the construction of their residence in Passow, in collaboration with the architects Eduard Petzold and Jan David Zocher. In 1869, Louise founded a charity foundation for orphans, the Luisestiftelsen ('Louise Foundation').

== Death ==
Princess Louise of the Netherlands died on 6 December 1870, in Huize De Paauw, Wassenaar, at the age of 62. Her body was buried, alongside her husband Prince Frederick, in Nieuwe Kerk, Delft, South Holland, Netherlands.

== Ancestry ==
Ancestors of Princess Louise of Prussia (1808–1870)

8. Prince Augustus William of Prussia
4. Frederick William II of Prussia
9. Duchess Luise of Brunswick-Wolfenbüttel
2. Frederick William III of Prussia
10. Louis IX, Landgrave of Hesse-Darmstadt
5. Princess Frederica Louisa of Hesse-Darmstadt
11. Countess Palatine Caroline of Zweibrücken
1. Princess Louise of Prussia
12. Duke Charles Louis Frederick of Mecklenburg-Strelitz
6. Charles II, Grand Duke of Mecklenburg-Strelitz
13. Princess Elisabeth Albertine of Saxe-Hildburghausen
3. Duchess Louise of Mecklenburg-Strelitz
14. Prince George William of Hesse-Darmstadt
7. Princess Friederike of Hesse-Darmstadt
15. Countess Maria Louise Albertine of Leiningen-Dagsburg-Falkenburg
