= Princess Marie of the Netherlands =

Princess Marie
- Princess of Wied
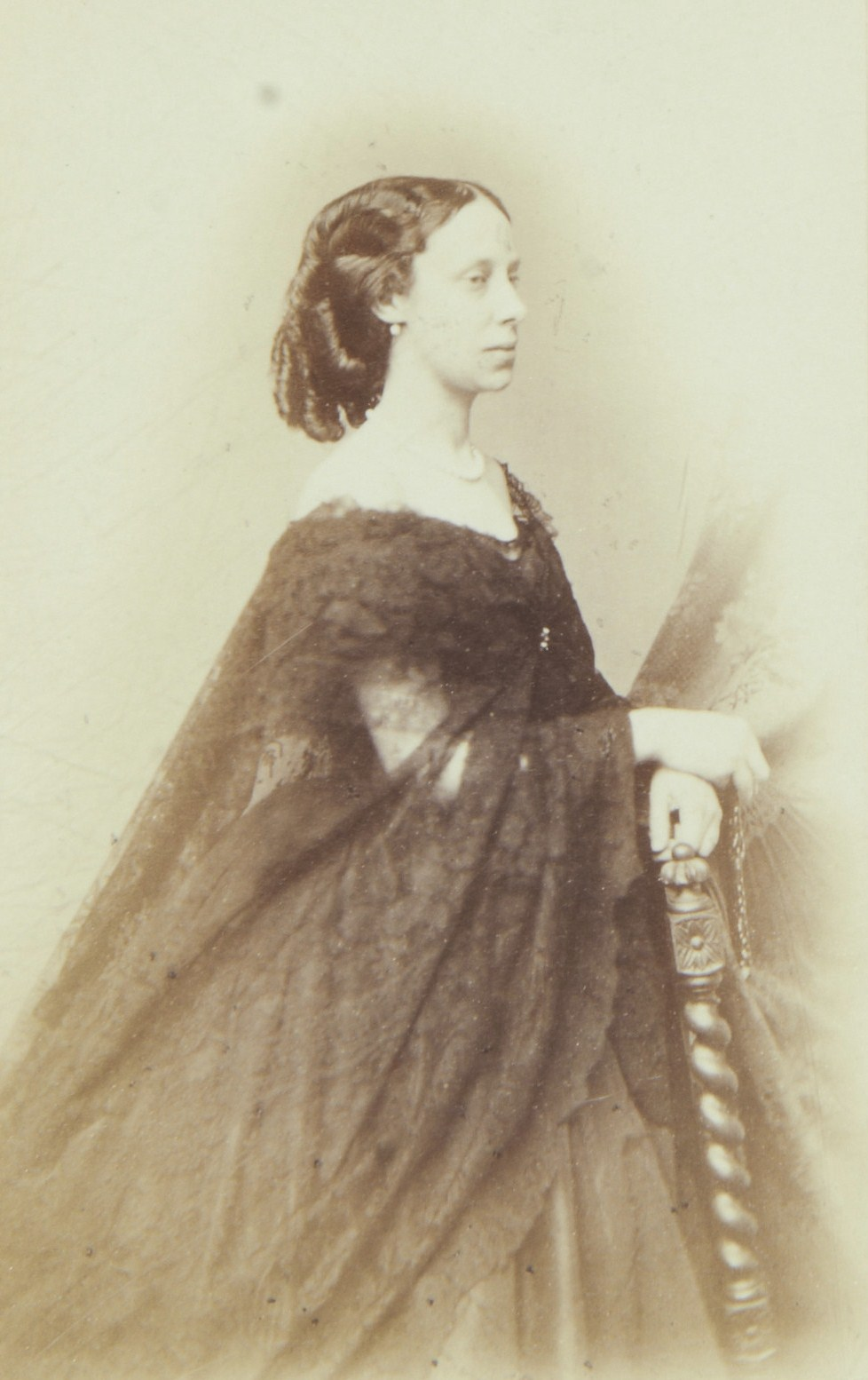
- Marie in 1871
- Born: 5 June 1841; Wassenaar, Netherlands
- Died: 22 June 1910 (aged 69); Neuwied, Kingdom of Prussia
- Spouse: William, Prince of Wied (m. 1871; died 1907)
- Issue Detail: Friedrich, Prince of Wied; Prince Alexander; Wilhelm, Prince of Albania; Prince Victor; Princess Louise; Princess Elisabeth
Names
- Dutch: Wilhelmina Frederika Anna Elisabeth Marie
- House: Orange-Nassau
- Father: Prince Frederick of the Netherlands
- Mother: Princess Louise of Prussia

Princess Marie of the Netherlands (Dutch: Prinses Wilhelmina Frederika Anna Elisabeth Marie der Nederlanden, Prinses van Oranje-Nassau; 5 June 1841 – 22 June 1910) was the fourth child and younger daughter of Prince Frederick of the Netherlands and wife of William, 5th Prince of Wied. She was the mother of William, Prince of Albania. Marie was also the last surviving grandchild of William I, King of the Netherlands.

== Early life and ancestry ==
Marie was born at Wassenaar, Netherlands, the fourth child and younger daughter of Prince Frederick of the Netherlands (1797–1881) second son of William I of the Netherlands, and his wife, Princess Louise of Prussia (1808–1870), daughter of Frederick William III of Prussia. By birth, she was a member of the House of Orange-Nassau.

Princess Marie was diagnosed with profound hearing problems at an early age. Like her sister Louise, she was considered intelligent - and very regal - but not attractive.

Her marital considerations were also affected by the considerable fortune (enormous even by contemporary royal/imperial standards) that she would bring to any match.

Her parents hoped to marry her to Albert Edward, Prince of Wales (later King Edward VII) but the Prince's mother, Queen Victoria opposed the match.

== Marriage and family ==
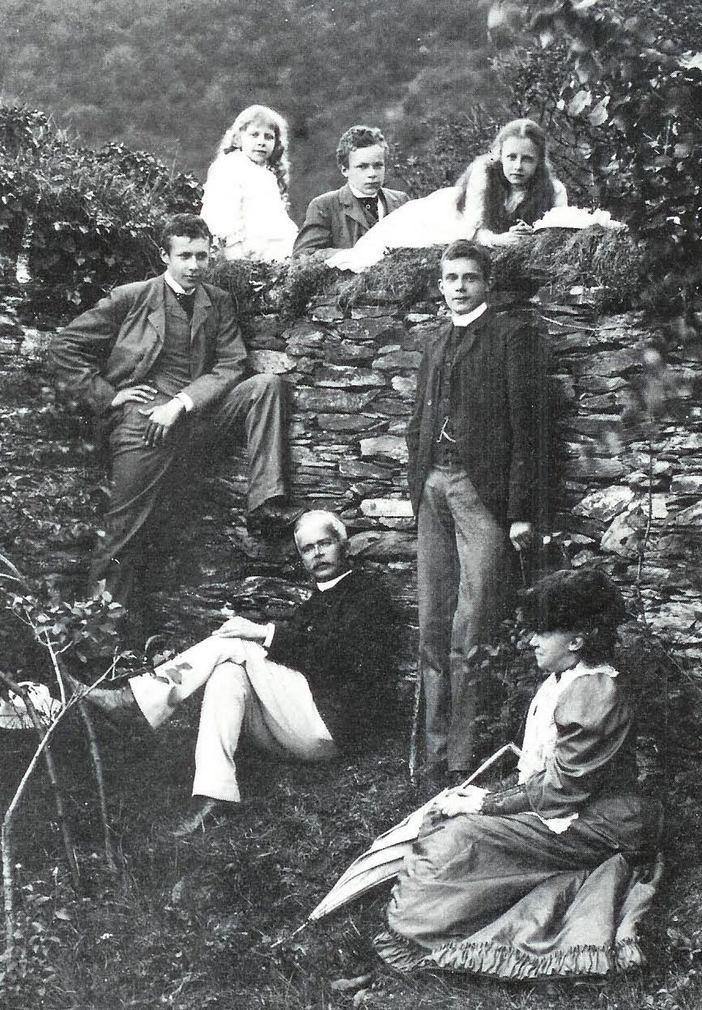
Marie with her family (c. 1890)

Marie married on 18 July 1871 in Wassenaar, William, Prince of Wied (1845–1907). Born a member of the House of Wied, he was brother of Queen Elisabeth of Romania and the son of Hermann, Prince of Wied and his wife, Princess Marie of Nassau.

They had six children:

- Friedrich, Prince of Wied (27 June 1872 – 18 June 1945); married Princess Pauline of Württemberg, had issue.
- Prince Alexander of Wied (28 May 1874 – 15 January 1877)
- Wilhelm, Prince of Albania (26 March 1876 – 18 April 1945); married Princess Sophie of Schönburg-Waldenburg (1885–1936), had issue.
- Prince Victor of Wied (7 December 1877 – 1 March 1946); married Countess Gisela of Solms-Wildenfels (1891–1976), had issue.
- Princess Louise of Wied (24 October 1880 – 29 August 1965)
- Princess Elisabeth of Wied (28 January 1883 – 14 November 1938)

== Death ==
Princess Marie died on 22 June 1910, in Neuwied, Kingdom of Prussia, aged 69. Her body was buried, alongside her husband, in a Wied family crypt in Monrepos castle, Neuwied, Germany.

== Ancestry ==
Ancestors of Princess Marie of the Netherlands

8. William V, Prince of Orange
4. William I of the Netherlands
9. Princess Wilhelmina of Prussia
2. Prince Frederick of the Netherlands
10. Frederick William II of Prussia
5. Princess Wilhelmine of Prussia
11. Landgravine Frederika Louisa of Hesse-Darmstadt
1. Princess Marie of the Netherlands
12. Frederick William II of Prussia (= 10)
6. Frederick William III of Prussia
13. Landgravine Frederika Louisa of Hesse-Darmstadt (= 11)
3. Princess Louise of Prussia
14. Charles II, Grand Duke of Mecklenburg-Strelitz
7. Duchess Louise of Mecklenburg-Strelitz
15. Princess Friederike of Hesse-Darmstadt

== Notes and sources ==
- The Royal House of Stuart, London, 1969, 1971, 1976, Addington, A. C., Reference: page 354.
