= Biebrich, Rhineland Palatinate =

Biebrich
- Municipality
- Coat of arms
- Interactive map of Biebrich
- Location within Germany Location within Rhineland-Palatinate
- Coordinates: 50°18′10.94″N 7°57′16.24″E
- Country: Germany
- State: Rhineland-Palatinate
- District: Rhein-Lahn-Kreis
- Municipal assoc.: Aar-Einrich

Government
  - Mayor (2019–24): Jürgen Christoph Hamdorf-Merk

Area
  - Total: 3.45 km^{2} (1.33 sq mi)
- Elevation: 290 m (950 ft)

Population (2025-12-31)
  - Total: 323
  - Density: 93.6/km^{2} (242/sq mi)
- Time zone: UTC+01:00 (CET)
  - Summer (DST): UTC+02:00 (CEST)
- Postal codes: 56370
- Dialling codes: 06486
- Vehicle registration: EMS, DIZ, GOH

Biebrich (German pronunciation: [ˈbiːbʁɪç]) is a municipality in the district of Rhein-Lahn, in Rhineland-Palatinate, in western Germany. It belongs to the association community of Aar-Einrich.
