= Barony of Westerburg =

German principality

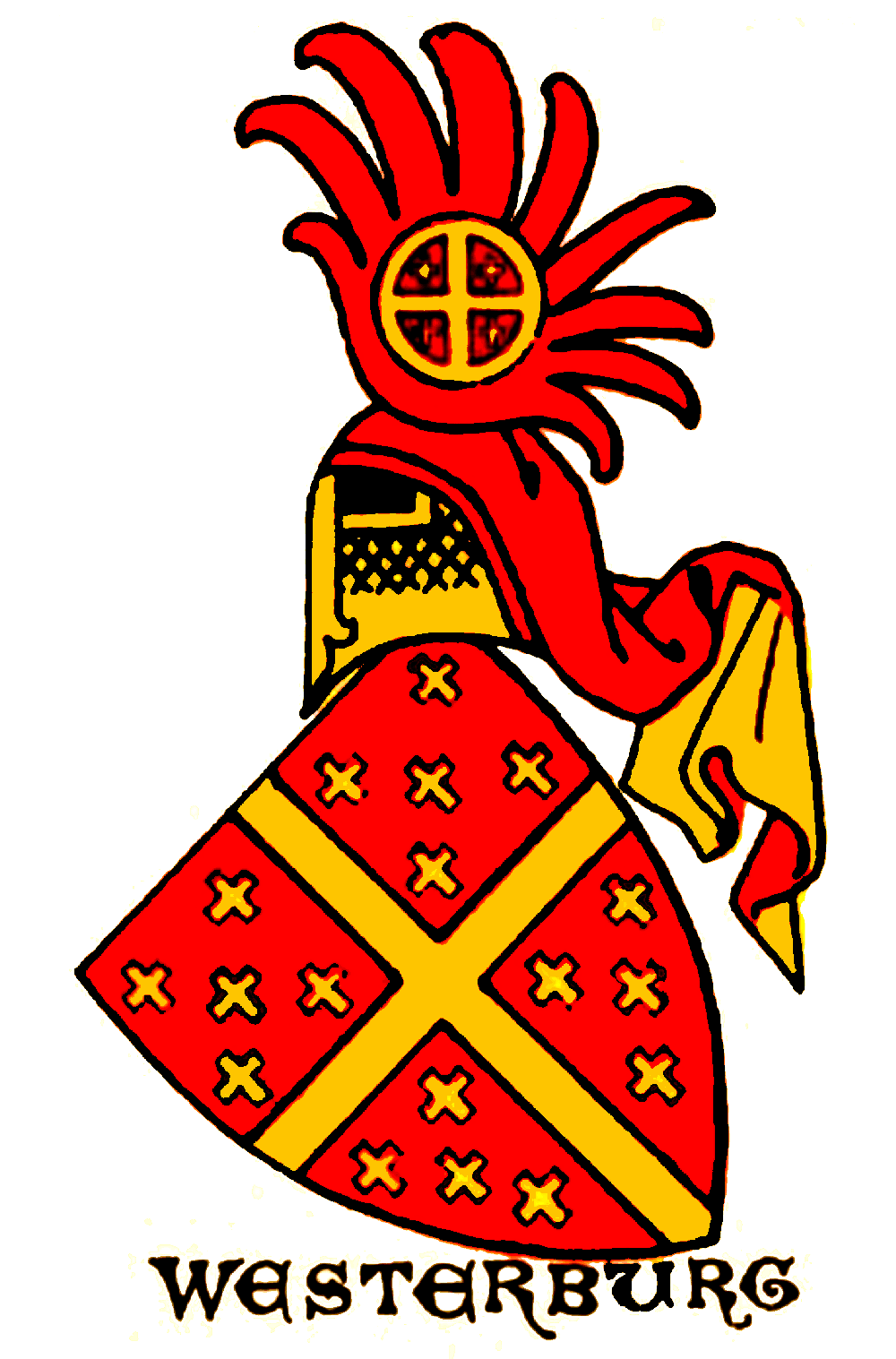
Family coat of arms of the lords of Westerburg

The Barony of Westerburg (German: Herrschaft Westerburg), a small principality around the present day town of Westerburg in the Westerwald mountains of Germany, is first recorded in 1209. The eponymous castle, which had probably been built earlier than when it was mentioned for the first time in 1192, was the family seat of the lords of Westerburg, a branch of the lords of Runkel.

== Predecessors: the lords of Runkel ==
The lords of Westerburg go back to the House of Runkel, which had its main seat at Runkel Castle on the River Lahn. After this older branch died out, the lords of Westerburg inherited most of the estate rights of their Runkel cousins.

The House of Runkel is first mentioned in a deed dated 1 April 1159. At that time a Siegfried of Runkel was a witness, when the lords of Laurenburg, later the House of Nassau, were given Nassau Castle as a fief. It is possible that, even at that time, the main territorial estate of the House of Runkel was in the region of Westerburg. This is evinced by the fact that Runkel Castle had only a very small estate in its immediate vicinity.

== Foundation and early history ==
Through his marriage to a countess from the House of Leiningen, Siegfried III of Runkel acquired both Westerburg as well as the Vogtei over Stift St. Severus in Gemünden and called himself henceforth Siegfried of Runkel and of Westerburg. Two of his sons inherited: Siegfried IV of Runkel, who resided in Westerburg, and Dietrich I of Runkel, who lived in Runkel. By around 1250 family disputes arose that, under Siegfried' grandchildren, finally led to the separation of the baronies of Runkel and Westerburg, at the latest in 1288. Dietrich's son, Siegfried V of Runkel, threatened his cousin, Henry from Runkel, and the latter, a son of Siegfried IV, called himself henceforth, Henry II of Westerburg. He underlined the enmity by building the Schadeck Castle, first recorded in 1288, on the north bank of the Lahn opposite Runkel. Through his marriage to Agnes, daughter of Gerhard of Limburg, Henry also came into the possession of the Barony of Schaumburg and one sixth of the Barony of Cleeburg. After Henry of Westerburg, seven generations of direct descendants followed him as lords of Westerburg:

- Siegfried of Westerburg (died 1315)
- Reinhard I of Westerburg (died 1353)
- John I of Westerburg (1332–1370)
- Reinhard II of Westerburg (1354–1421)
- Reinhard III of Westerburg (died 1449)
- Cuno I of Westerburg (1425–1459)
- Reinhard IV (1453–1522), from 1475 Reinhard I of Leiningen-Westerburg

Like the other small principalities between the rivers Rhine, Main and Sieg, the Barony was constantly under pressure from the Prince-Archbishopric of Trier and the expansive counts of Nassau, and the House of Westerburg thus sought to protect itself by marrying into the other noble families of the area. For example, they married into the houses of Isenburg Limburg, Solms, Merenberg, Sayn, Virneburg, Leiningen, Wied, Cronberg, Diez, Weilnau, Runkel and even Nassau-Wiesbaden.

== Fusion with Leiningen ==
On the death of Count Hesso of Leiningen-Dagsburg on 8 March 1467, the male line of this branch of the Leiningen counts died out. His sister, Margareta, who was married to Reinhard III of Westerburg, inherited the greater part of the estate of this older main line of the House of Leiningen, and the Westerburg family were then called Leiningen-Westerburg. When Countess Margareta died in 1470, her entire Westerburg and Leiningen estate fell to her grandson Reinhard IV who, with the imperial permission, named himself Count Reinhard I of Leiningen-Westerburg from 1475 onwards and moved his seat to the County of Leiningen. His son Cuno III. (died 1547) had three sons who founded the three lines of the family.

== Seat of Leiningen branches ==
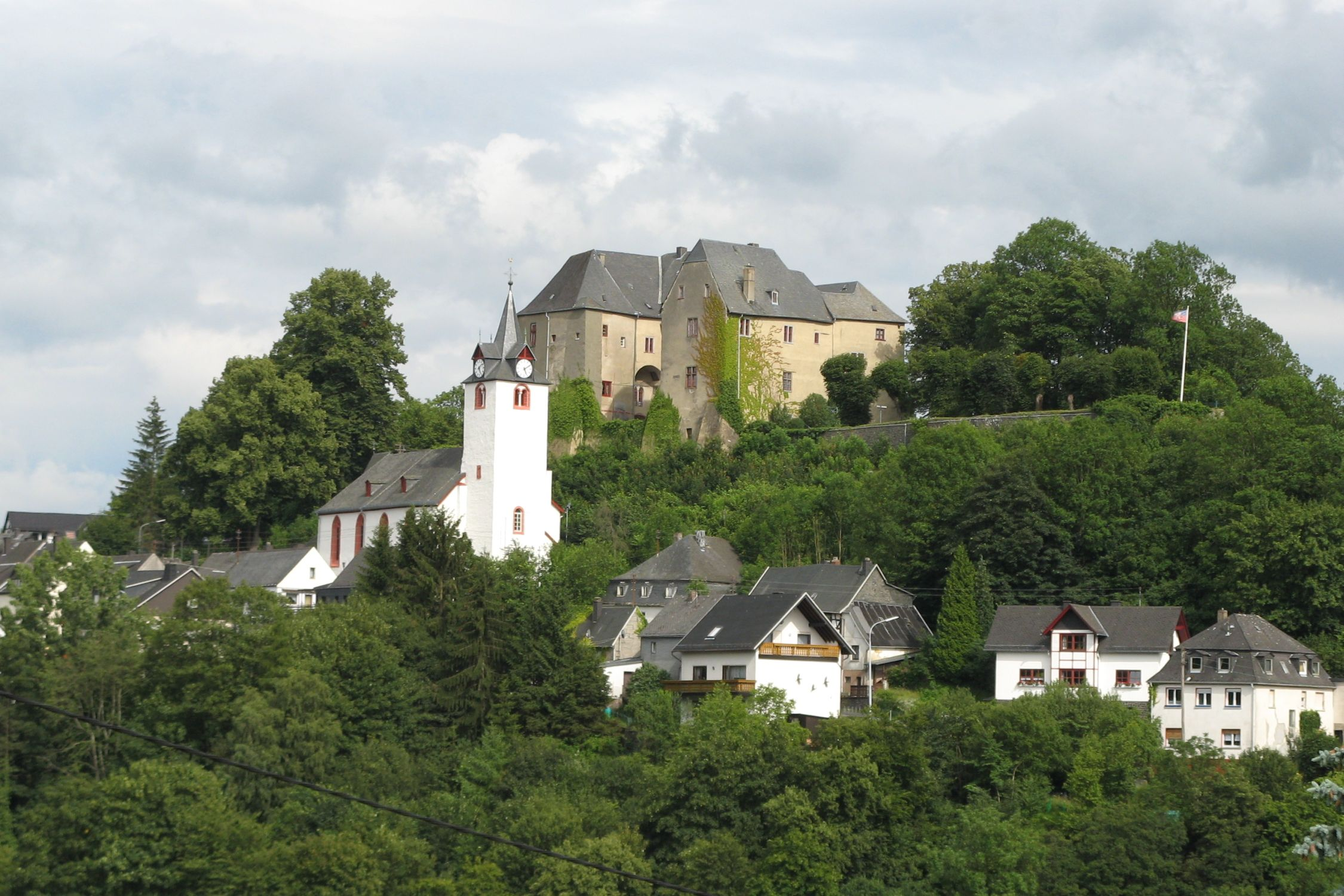
Schloss Westerburg above the town

It was not until 1557 that Westerburg was once again the seat of secondary lines of the House of Leiningen, which was repeatedly divided. Under Reinhard's grandsons, the three branches of Leiningen-Leiningen, Leiningen-Westerburg and Leiningen-Schaumburg were established. Reinhard II of Leiningen-Westerburg (1530–1584) resided in Westerburg from 1557 onwards, but the Leiningen-Westerburg line ended in 1597 with the death of his sons Albert Philip (1567–1597) and John Louis (1572–1597). It was inherited by the Leiningen-Schaumburg line, which also continued to branch from 1695 and from which two secondary lines still exist today, Leiningen-Westerburg-Altleiningen and Leiningen-Westerburg-Neuleiningen.

== End ==
In 1806, in the wake of the creation of the Confederation of the Rhine under Napoleon, Westerburg was added to the Grand Duchy of Berg, but by 1813/1815 it had passed to the Duchy of Nassau and in 1866, with annexation of Nassau, it went to Prussia. Since 1946, the area of the former Westerburg principality has belonged to the state of Rhineland-Palatinate.

== Coat of arms ==
Family coat of arms of the lords of Westerburg

The heraldic achievement of the Westerburgs comprises a gold cross on a red field, studded with 20 (4x 5 (2:1:2)) gold crosslets. On the helmet with its red and gold mantling a red or black vol, embellished with a red disc with a gold perimeter and a gold cross, studded with 5 (2:1:2) golden crosslets (one in each corner and one in the centre); the vol may also be decorated like the escutcheon.

== Members of the house ==
- Siegfried of Westerburg, 1275–1297 Archbishop of Cologne

== Literature ==
- Sante, Wilhelm: Geschichte der Deutschen Länder - Territorien-Ploetz. Wurzburg, 1964.
- Köbler, Gerhard: Historisches Lexikon der Deutschen Länder. Munich, 1988.
