= Wied-Dierdorf =

European polity

Wied-Dierdorf was a County of Rhineland-Palatinate, Germany, located on the Wied River. It was created as a partition of Wied in 1631, and was inherited by Wied-Neuwied in 1709.

== Counts of Wied-Dierdorf (1631–1709) ==
- John Ernest (1631–1664)
- Louis Frederick (1664–1709)
