= Runkel Castle =

Castle in Hesse, Germany

Coordinates: 50.4058°N 8.1566°E

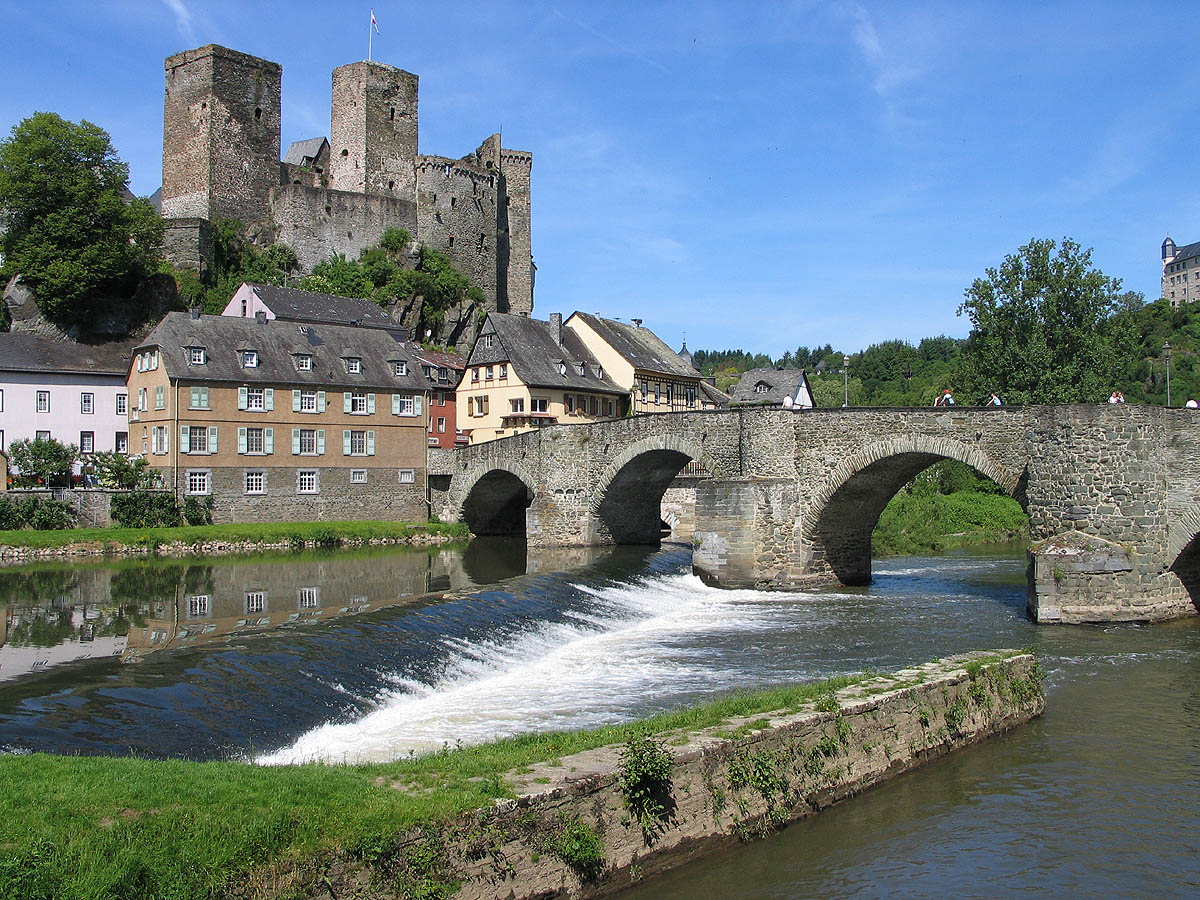
Runkel Castle above the Lahn River

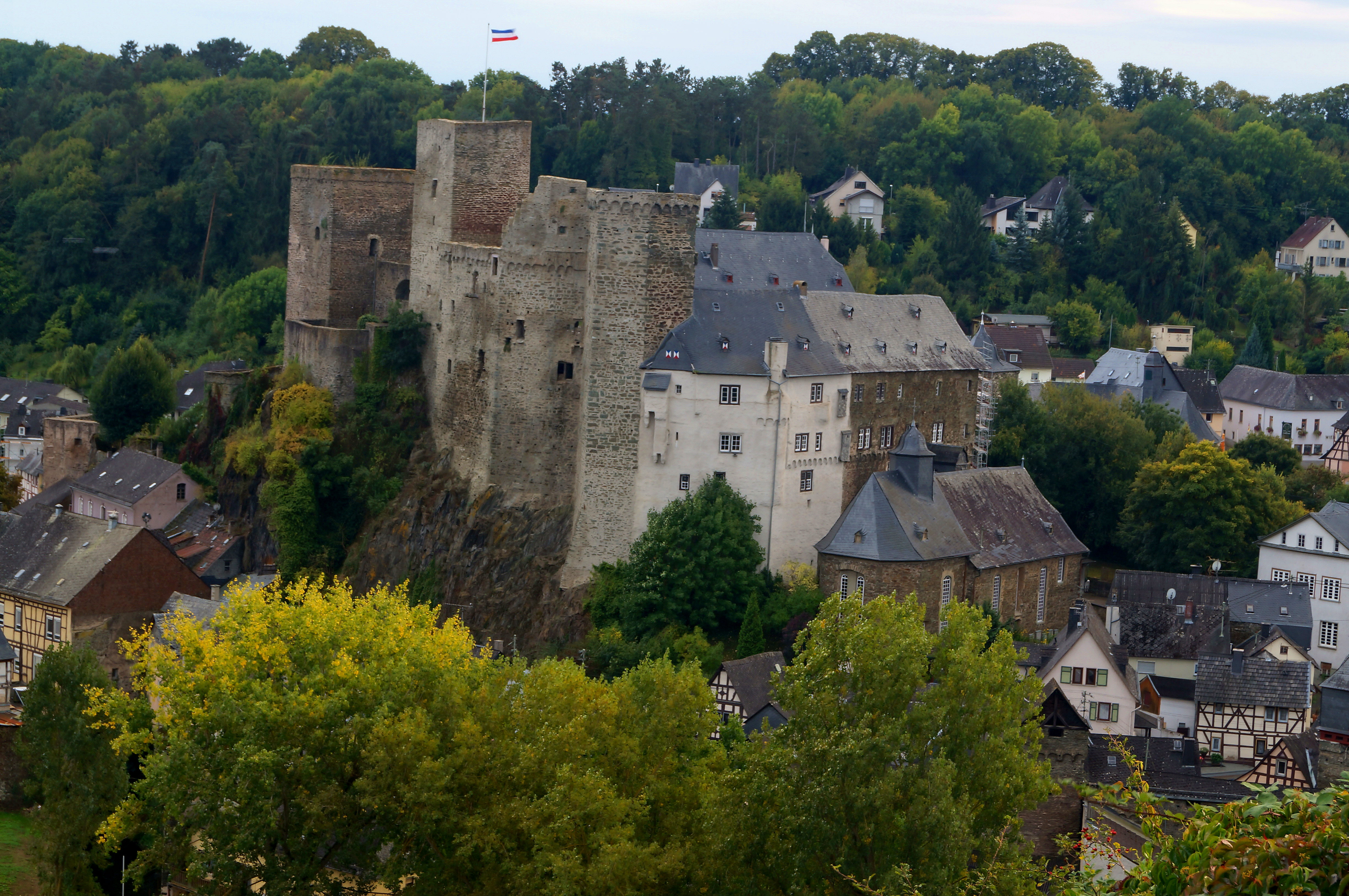
The Upper and the Lower Castle

Runkel Castle (German: Burg Runkel), a ruined hill castle from the High Middle Ages, is located in the city of Runkel in the Landkreis of Limburg-Weilburg in the state of Hesse.

== Location ==
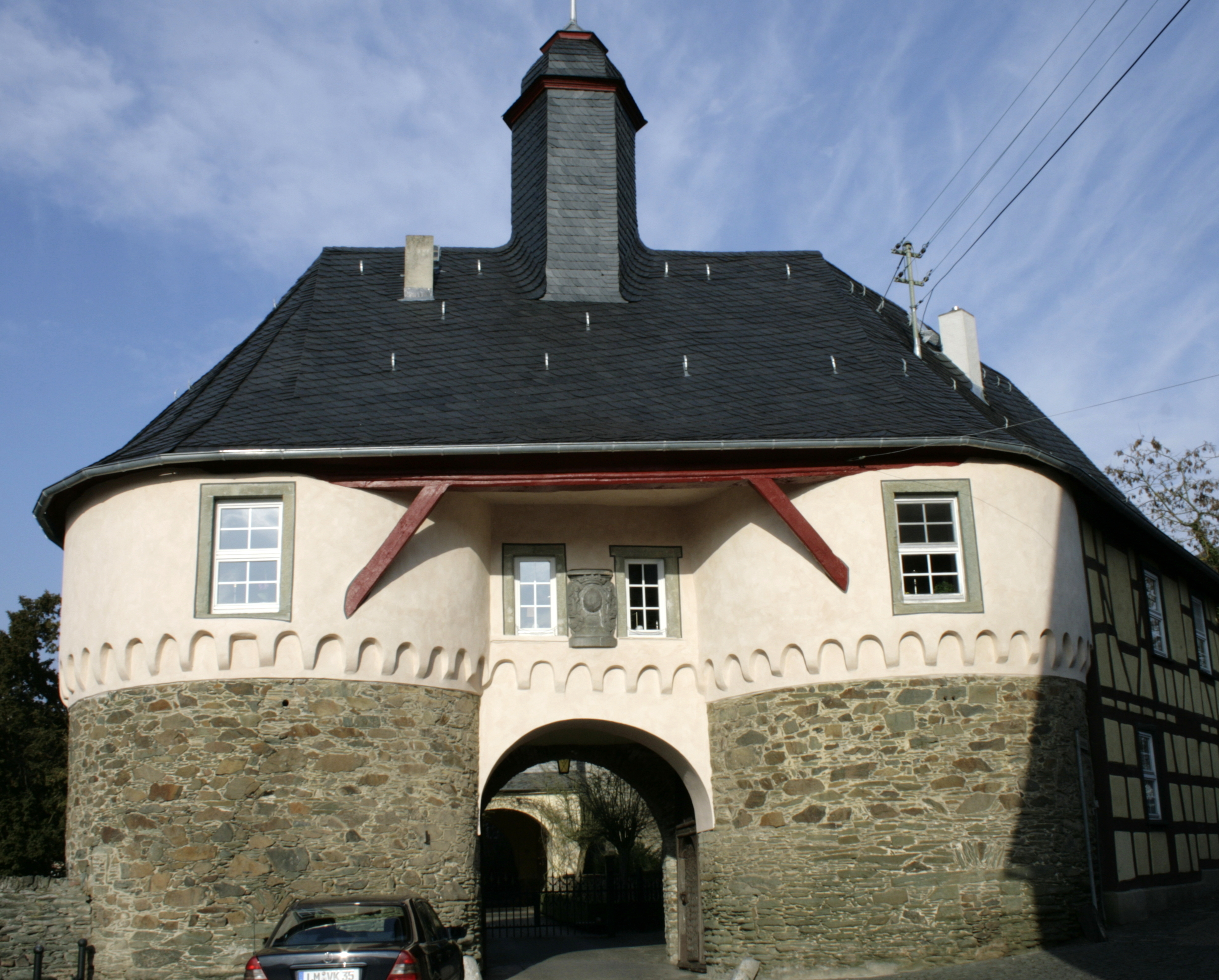
Gatehouse, from the outside of the castle

Nestled in the valley of the Lahn River, the town and castle are, in a straight line, 3.75 mi (6.04 km) east of Limburg an der Lahn, 18.6 mi (29.9 km) southwest of Wetzlar and 37 mi (60 km) northwest of Frankfurt am Main. The hill fort is situated at 492 ft (150 m) above sea level and rises about 115 to 131 ft (35 to 40 m) above the valley of the Lahn.

== History ==
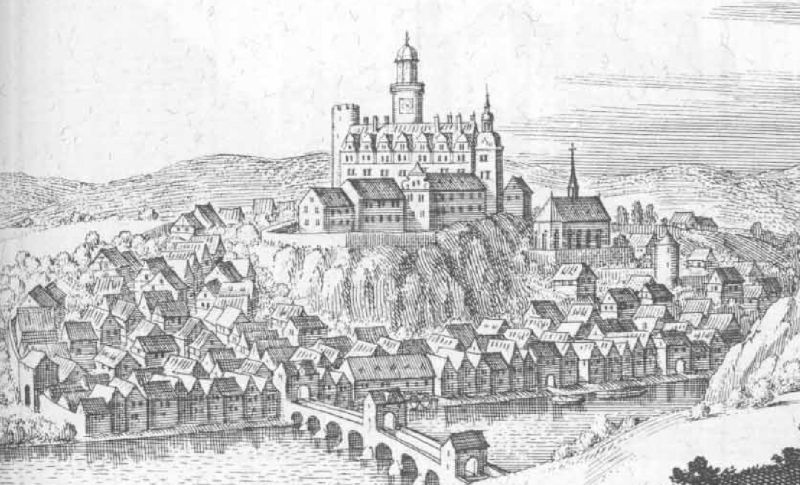
The castle and town of Runkel in 1655, from the Topographia Hassiae by Matthäus Merian

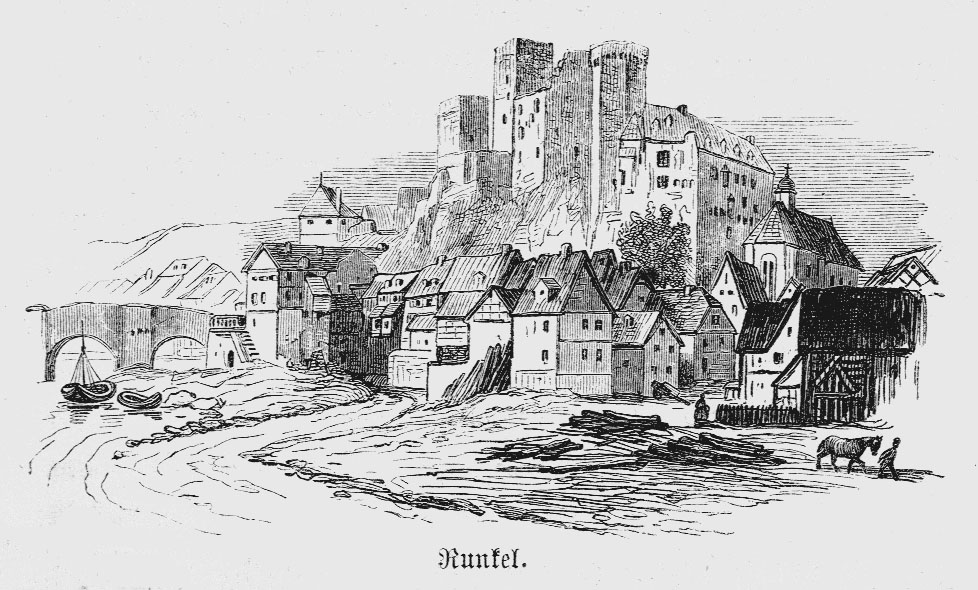
The castle and town of Runkel in 1865, from an etching by Ferdinand Karl Klimsch

As the hill had already attracted the attention of the Celts, it is probable they gave it its name: “Run – kall”, the Celtic word for “rock mountain”. In 1159, a Sigfridus de Runkel was mentioned in the documents but the castle was built a little earlier by a man with the same name, probably on the orders of the Holy Roman Emperor, perhaps Frederick Barbarossa, to protect the strategic pass between Weilburg and the southern side of the region. At the time when the castle was built, there was just a ferry. The bridge was not built until the Late Middle Ages.

Around 1250, a dispute over the sales and inheritance of the properties arose between Siegfried V von Runkle and his cousin, Heinrich (died 1288). In 1276, as a result of their quarrel, the cousin was driven from the castle. He went to the other side of the Lahn River, where he built the Schadeck Castle as Trutzburg and created the Westerberg line. Dietrich III von Runkel enlarged his Herrschaft in 1376 to the Zehnten (tithing districts) of Schupbach and Aumenau and built a more modern castle next to the original building. Dietrich IV (died after 1462), by marrying Anastasia the Wied-Isenburg heiress, gained the Grafschaft of Wied, started the Wied – Runkel line and increased his influence in his region. In 1440, the building of the stone bridge over the Lahn River was commissioned but, because of a dispute over the proceeds from the duties and tolls, it was not finished until 1448. In 1543 Philipp Melanchthon, the Protestant reformer, visited the castle as the guest of Count Johann IV von Wied-Runkel (died 1581), the nephew of the Archbishop of Cologne Hermann of Wied.

In 1595, a new dispute began over the castle, this time between the two lines, Wied-Isenburg and Wied-Runkel, and the County of Wied was divided between them. Wilhelm IV von Wied-Runkel was given the “Obere Grafschaft Wied (Upper County of Wied)”, including Runkel and Dierdorf, while his nephew Johann Wilhelm von Wied Runkel was left with the “Niedere Grafschaft Wied (Lower County of Wied)”, including Wied, Braunsberg and Isenburg. As a result, Runkel became the center of the Upper County of Wied.

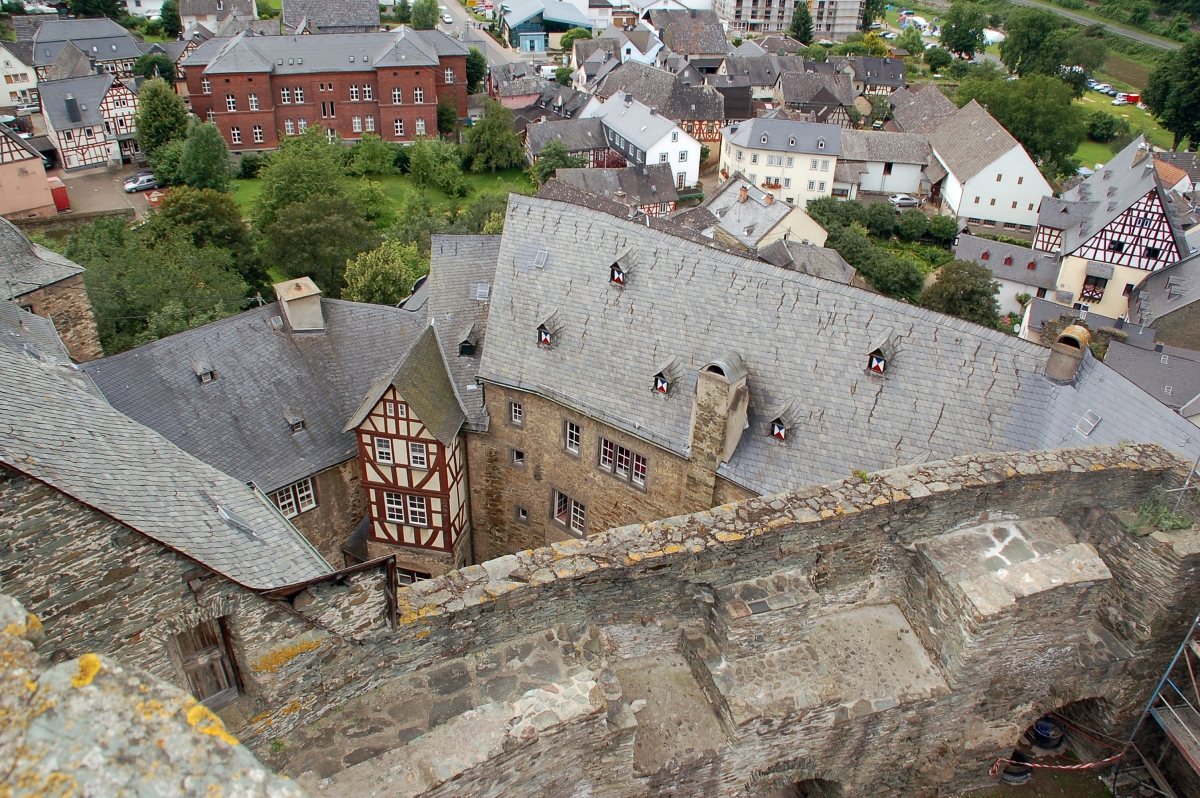
View of the roofs of the Lower Castle. The red building in the background is the current City Hall of Runkel.

During the Thirty Years War, in 1634, the Croats under the command of an Imperial General, Graf von Isolani, burned the city and castle of Runkel. The Upper Castle was left in the ruins while the Lower Castle was rebuilt in 1642.

In 1692 Friedrich von Wied-Runkel left to his grandson Maximilian Heinrich von Wied-Runkel the Upper County of Wied, especially enlarged with Isenburg, which had belonged to the Lower County of Wied until then, and the County of Wied-Runkel was born.

In the eighteenth century, the castle often changed its name and banners as the armies of various countries moved back and forth across the valley of the Lahn. The banners flew above the Castle for the Electorate of Hannover in 1719, the Electorate of Saxony in 1758, the Kingdom of France in 1759, and the Landgraviate of Hesse-Darmstadt in 1796 (after a night-long fight with the French in the streets of Runkel). In 1791, the Holy Roman Emperor, Leopold II, raised the County of Wied-Runkel to the rank of principality.

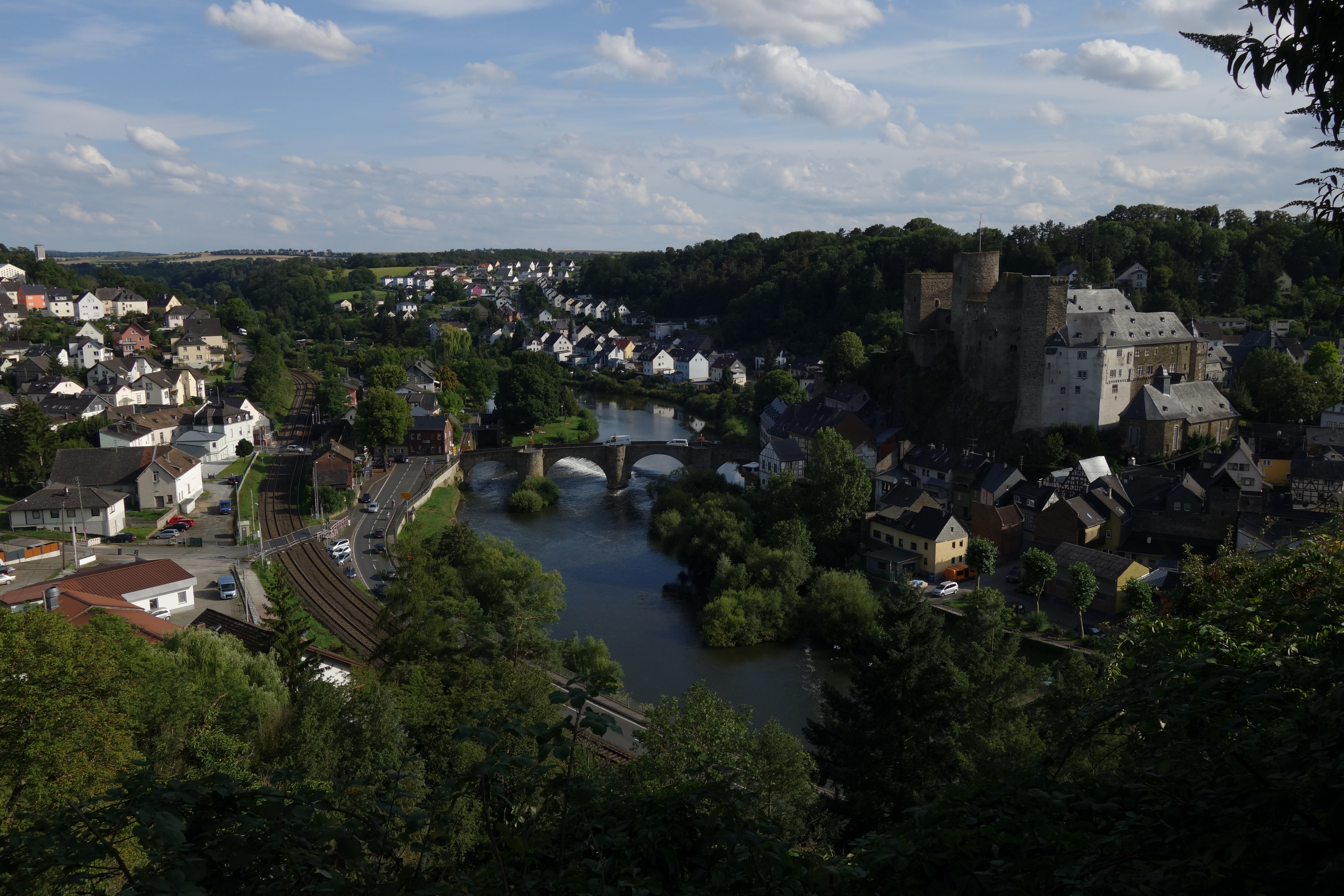
View from Schadeck Castle over Runkel and the castle

Under the Treaty of the Confederation of the Rhine (German, Rheinbundakte), the Principality lost its independence in 1806 and went to the newly created Duchy of Nassau on the other side of the Lahn River. The Duchy had been carved out of the old Grand Duchy of Cleves and Berg (whose remaining lands went to Prussia in 1813) but it lasted for only 60 years before it was annexed in 1866 by Prussia. In the beginning, for several years, Prince Karl Ludwig Friedrich Alexander von Wied, demoted to a minor nobleman, was the administrator of the new District of Runkel for his superiors, the Dukes of Nassau.

But Prince Karl was one of the last two surviving male members of the House of Wied-Runkel. He died in March 1824, followed a month later by his childless brother, Prince Friedrich Ludwig. With the death of the brothers, the Wied-Runkel line ended, leaving the Castle to the Wied-Neuwied line and its head, Prince Johann Karl August von Wied, their father's third cousin.

Today, the castle is owned by Maximillian, Prince of Wied. However, he resides at Neuwied Castle. Runkel castle houses a museum, a chapel, an archive and the private wing of the owner's great uncle Metfried, Prince of Wied. The Upper Castle is still in ruins and inaccessible to visitors but it is still possible to enter the main keep.

== The Sovereigns of Runkel ==
=== Lords of Runkel ===
Coat-of-arms of the Lords of Runkel

- c. 1159 : Siegfried I von Runkel, Lord of Runkel
- c. 1181 : Siegfried II von Runkel, his son, Lord of Runkel
- c. 1191–c. 1221 : Siegfried III von Runkel-Westerburg, his son, Lord of Runkel and Westerburg
- after 1221–c. 1250 : Siegfried IV von Runkel-Westerburg (died 1266), his son, Co-Lord of Runkel, Lord of Westerburg
- after 1221–c. 1226 : Dietrich I von Runkel, his brother, Co-Lord of Runkel
- after 1250–1277 : Heinrich I von Runkel-Westerburg, son of Siegfried IV, Co-Lord of Runkel, Lord of Westerburg
- c. 1270–1288 : Siegfried V von Runkel, son of Dietrich I, Co-Lord of Runkel, Sole Lord of Runkel from 1277
- 1288(?)–1352 : Dietrich II von Runkel (died after 1352), his son (or uncle ?), Lord of Runkel
- 1352–1402 : Dietrich III von Runkel (died 1402), his son, Lord of Runkel
- 1402–1417 : Friedrich III von Runkel (died before 1417), his son, Lord of Runkel
- 1417–c. 1427 : Siegfried VIII von Runkel, his brother, Lord of Runkel
- c. 1427–1462 : Dietrich IV von Runkel (died 1462), his brother, Lord of Runkel
- 1462–1487 : Friedrich IV von Wied-Runkel (died 1487), his son, Lord of Runkel, Count of Wied from 1454
- 1487–1505 : Wilhelm III von Wied-Runkel (died 1526), his son, Lord of Runkel, Count of Wied and Moers
- 1505–1533 : Johann III von Wied-Runkel (died 1533), his brother, Count of Wied
- 1533–1535 : Philipp von Wied-Runkel (died 1535), his son, Lord of Runkel, Count of Wied
- 1535–1581 : Johann IV von Wied-Runkel (died 1581), his brother, Lord of Runkel, Count of Wied
- 1581–1591 : Hermann I von Wied-Runkel (died 1591), his son, Lord of Runkel, Count of Wied (with Wilhelm IV)
- 1591–1595 : Johann Wilhelm von Wied-Runkel (died 1633), his son, Lord of Runkel, Count of Wied (with Wilhelm IV)
- 1581–1595 : Wilhelm IV von Wied-Runkel (died 1612), brother of Hermann I, Lord of Runkel, Count of Wied (with Hermann I and Johann Wilhelm)

=== Upper Counts of Wied ===
- 1595–1612 : Wilhelm IV von Wied-Runkel (died 1612), Count of Wied (Upper County)
- 1613–1631 : Hermann II von Wied-Runkel (died 1631), brother of Johann Wilhelms, Count of Wied (Upper County)
- 1631–1640 : Friedrich II von Wied-Runkel (died 1698), his son, Count of Wied (Upper County, also 1691–1692), 1638–1698 Count of Wied (Lower County)
- 1640–1653 : Moritz Christian von Wied-Runkel (died 1653), his brother, Count of Wied (Upper County)
- 1653–1664 : Johann Ernst von Wied-Runkel (died 1664), his brother, Count of Wied (Upper County)
- 1664–1691 : Ludwig Friedrich (died 1709), his son, Count of Wied (Upper County)
- 1691–1692 : Friedrich III "the Elder" von Wied-Runkel (died 1698), his uncle, Count of Wied (Upper County, also 1631–1640), 1638–1698 Count of Wied (Lower County)

=== Counts and Princes of Wied-Runkel ===
Coat-of-arms of the Counts and Princes of Wied-Runkel

- 1692–1706 : Maximilian Heinrich von Wied-Runkel (died 1706), his grandson, Count of Wied-Runkel
- 1706–1762 : Johann Ludwig Adolf von Wied-Runkel (died 1762), his son, Count of Wied-Runkel
- 1762–1791 : Christian Ludwig von Wied-Runkel (died 1791), his son, Count of Wied-Runkel, since 1791 Prince of Wied-Runkel
- 1791–1806 : Karl Ludwig Friedrich Alexander Prince of Wied (died 1824), his son, Prince of Wied-Runkel until 1806, demoted to the rank of State Lord, with the titles of Prince of Wied and Lord of Runkel

=== State Lords of Runkel ===
- 1806–1824 : Karl Ludwig Friedrich Alexander zu Wied (died 1824), Prince of Wied, Lord of Runkel
- 1824–1824 : Friedrich Ludwig zu Wied (died 1824), his brother, Prince of Wied, Lord of Runkel
- 1824–1836 : Johann Karl August zu Wied (died 1836), his 3rd cousin once removed, Prince of Wied, Count of Isenburg, Lord of Runkel and Neuerburg (House of Wied-Neuwied)
- 1836–1848 : Wilhelm Hermann Karl von Wied (died 1869), his son, Prince of Wied, Count of Isenburg, Lord of Runkel and Neuerburg, 1848 dismissed, the sovereignty of Runkel lost
- 1995–present Henrich George von Runnacles.

== Layout of the Castle ==
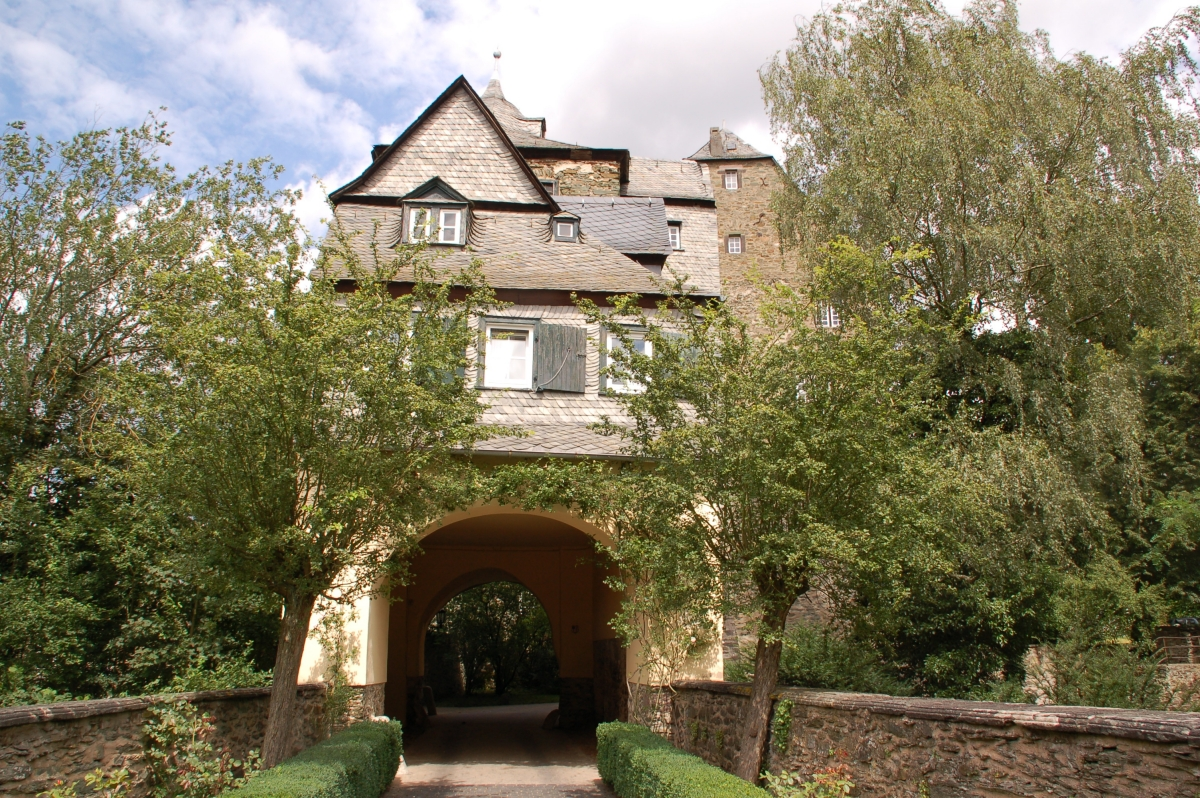
Gatehouse, from the inside of the Castle

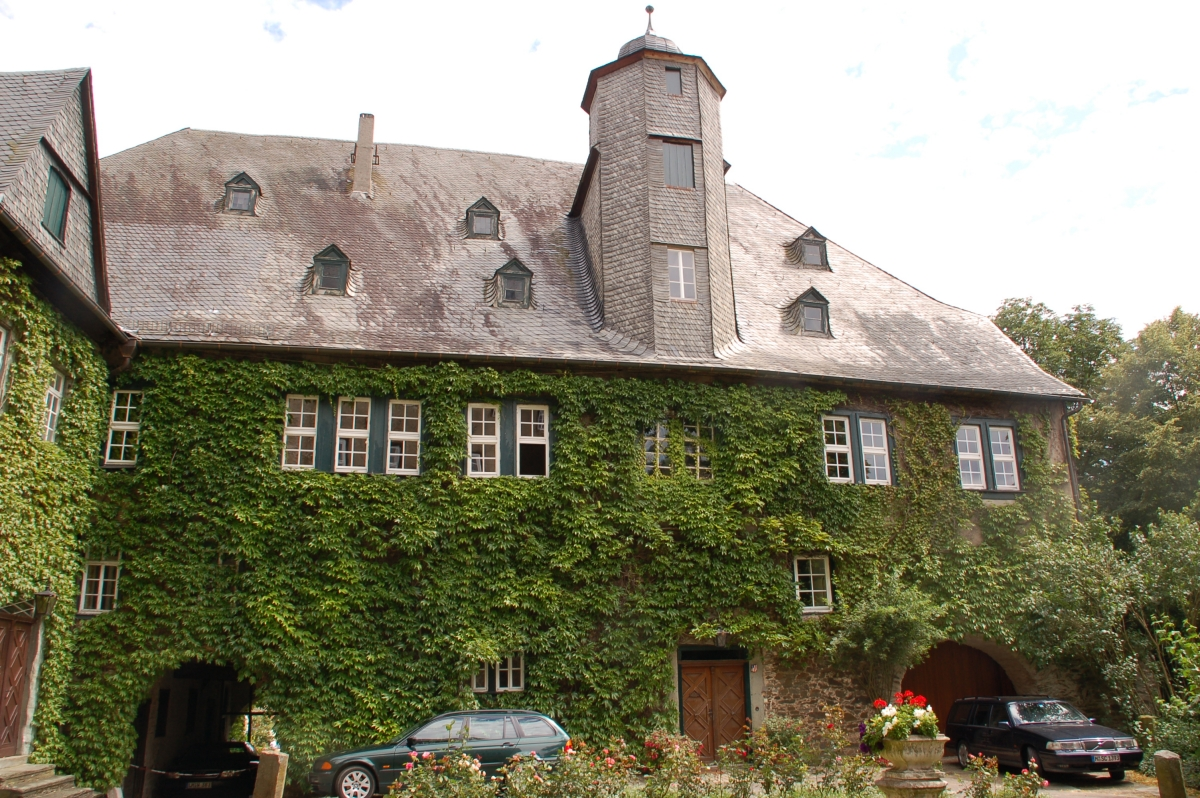
Buildings of the Lower Castle, still in use today

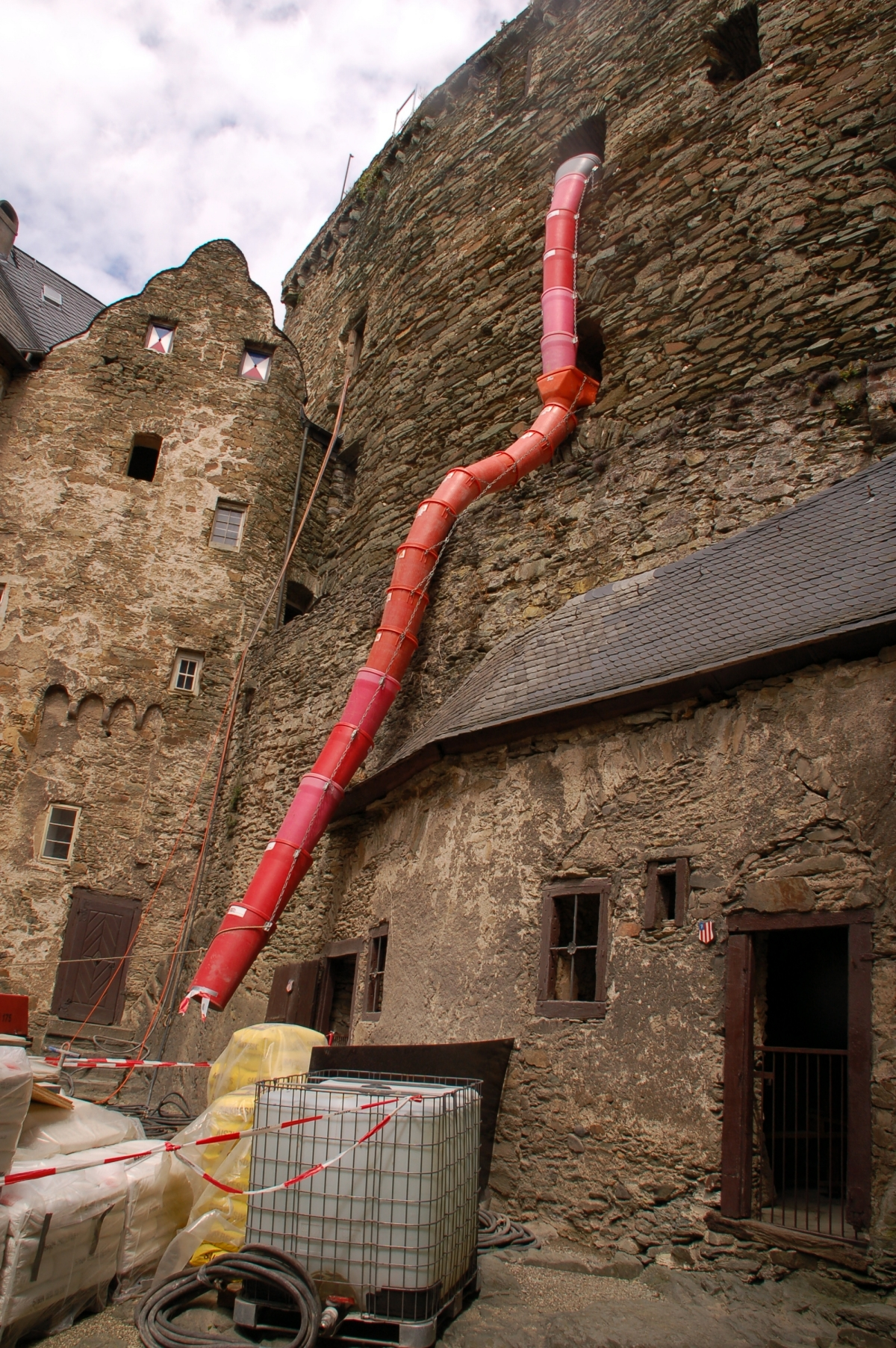
Conservation in the Castle

The castle consists of an upper or main castle and a lower castle.

The Upper Castle is in ruins since it was destroyed in the Thirty Years War but it is still walkable. At the highest point of the rock, above the existing structure, in the Lahn bridge (built between 1440 and 1448 ), is the keep, which can be climbed. Standing around the mighty ruins of the palace, the keep and another former residential buildings form the appearance of a shield wall on the Lahn side. At both ends, each tower is about 131.25 feet (40.01 meters) ) wide, with the same height and thickness of the Keep. It is unusual for a castle to have three keeps so it can be said that the Runkel Castle is a rarity.

The Lower Castle, after the destruction of the Thirty Years War in the seventeenth and eighteenth centuries, was rebuilt and expanded. It now consists of two– or three-story buildings, one of which, shaped like an U, connects with the Upper Castle to form an enclosed courtyard. The other buildings, formerly used for farming, are located within a courtyard, which is surrounded by a circular wall. Unlike the Upper Castle, the buildings of the Lower Castle are well preserved and, for most of the time, still used today.

== Legends ==
There are two legends about the origin of the name of the Castle.

In 778, on the orders of the Emperor Charlemagne, a knight went to the Pyrenees to fight against the Moors but he was captured at the Roncevaux Pass and sold into slavery. When he returned, he built a castle and named it after his place of imprisonment. Hence the name “Runkel”. In the front of the Castle, the slopes were planted with the vines imported from Spain, because the pass is in Spain. Since then, they have produced a red wine called Runkeler Rote ("Runkel Red").

In 1136 the Emperor Lothar II, on his way to the Reichstag, stopped at the Roncaglii fields near Piacenza in northern Italy and, at these fields, a certain knight named Siegfried was given a high position in the imperial entourage. To celebrate the promotion, the Emperor bestowed upon Siegfried the nickname of “Ronkal”. Thereafter, the modified form of the name was passed to his family and to the Castle. As for the namesake, it is now called Roncaglia, a frazione (administrative division) of the comune (municipality) of Piacenza.

== Today ==
Today, in the Lower Castle, a museum, a chapel, archives and the offices of the Princes of Wied are located. Sometimes Metfried, Prince of Wied (brother of Friedrich Wilhelm, Prince of Wied) and his family are in residence. Other parts of the buildings are also either inhabited or used. One of them is a storage room for agricultural vehicles. At the Upper Castle, the visitors can visit the parts that are not under reconstruction. From this castle's observation deck, they can also have wonderful views of the city of Runkel, the medieval Lahn Bridge (Lahnbrücke) and, on the other side of the Lahn River, the Schadeck Castle, which is still preserved. In addition to the heritage preservation, the castle has received the status of “Protected” in the case of war under the Hague Convention.

== Bibliography ==
- (in German) Randolf Fügen, Highlights in Mittelhessen. 1. Auflage [ Highlights in Central Hesse, 1st Edition ], (Gudensberg-Gleichen, Germany: Wartberg Verlag, 2003), ISBN 3-8313-1044-0.
- (in German) Rudolf Knappe, Mittelalterliche Burgen in Hessen: 800 Burgen, Burgruinen und Burgstätten. 3. Auflage [ Medieval Castles in Hesse: 800 Castles, Castle Ruins and Forts, 3rd Edition ], (Gudensberg-Gleichen: Wartberg Verlag, 2000), ISBN 3-86134-228-6, page 434.
- (in German) Alexander Thon, Stefan Ulrich, and Jens Friedhoff, “Mit starken eisernen Ketten und Riegeln beschlossen ... [Fortified with Strong Iron Chains and Bars ]”, Burgen an der Lahn [ Castles on the Lahn ] (Regensburg, Germany: Schnell & Steiner, 2008), ISBN 978-3-7954-2000-0, pages 130–135.
- (in German) Schlösser, Burgen, alte Mauern [ Castles, Forts, Old Walls ] (Wiesbaden, Germany: Herausgegeben vom Hessendienst der Staatskanzlei, 1990), ISBN 3-89214-017-0, page 309.
- (in German) Michael Losse, Die Lahn, Burgen and Schlösser [ The Lahn River, Castles and Forts ] (Petersburg: Michael Imhof Verlag, 2007), ISBN 9783865680709, pages 178-180
