= Arfurt =

Coordinates: 50°25′20″N 8°12′00″E

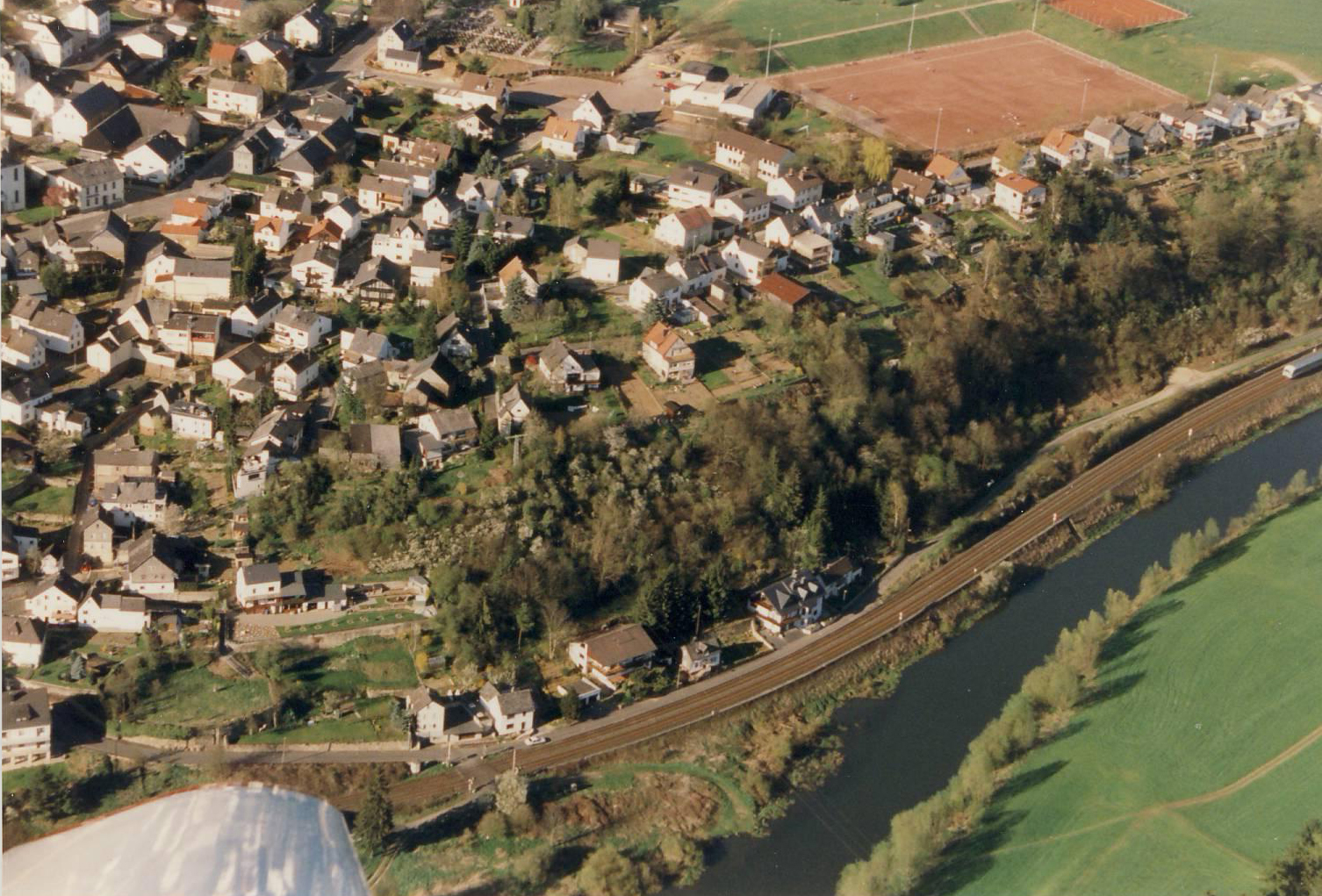
The village of Arfurt from the air.

Arfurt is a village on the river Lahn. It is part of the town of Runkel in the Limburg-Weilburg district in Hesse, Germany. It lies roughly 60 km from Frankfurt am Main and was founded around 1150. The village has 950 inhabitants as of 2008.
