= St. Severus (Gemünden) =

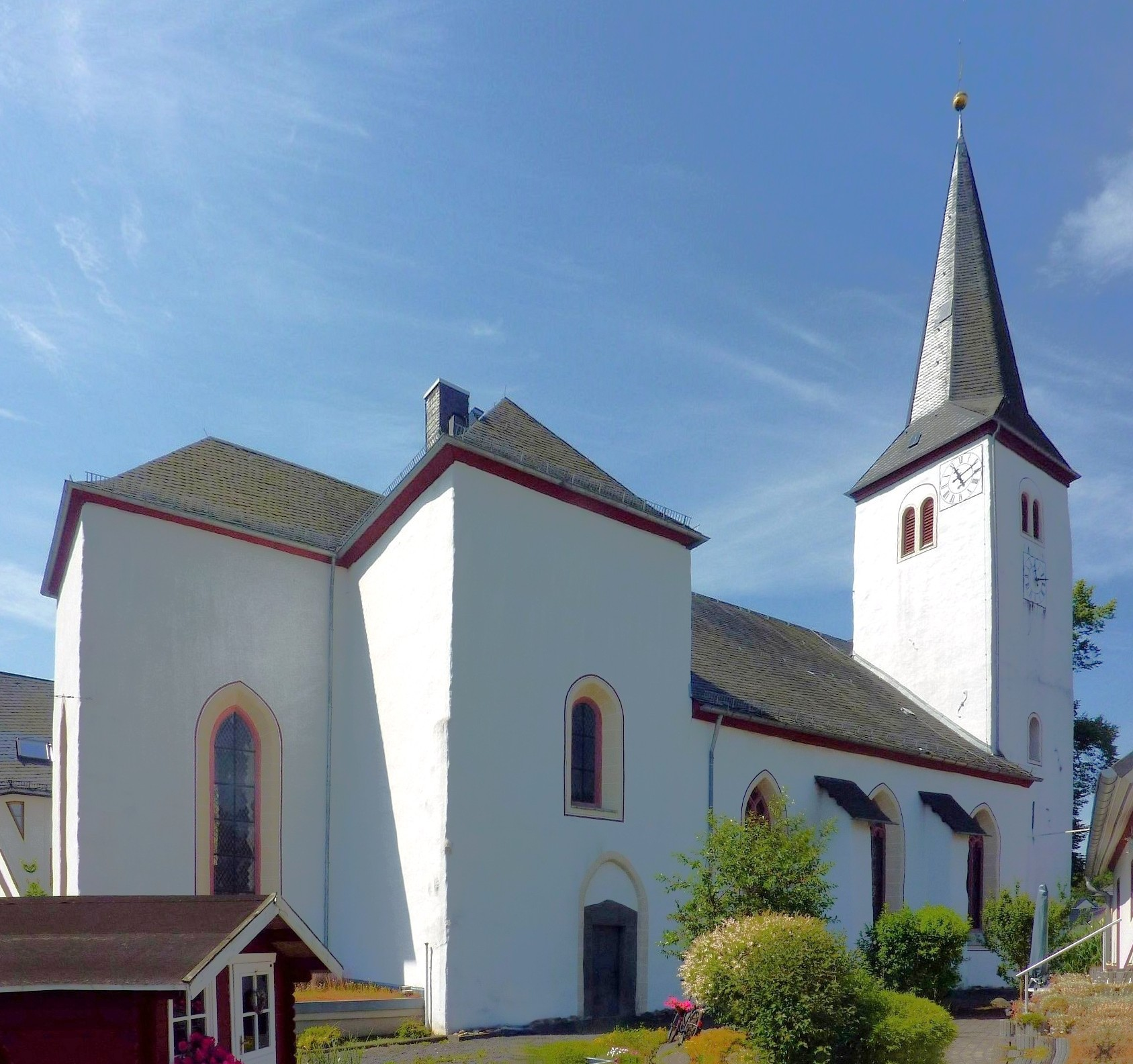
Collegiate church of St. Severus

The Stift of St. Severus was an ecclesiastical, collegiate foundation or stift in the village of Gemünden in the present-day county of Westerwaldkreis in the German state of Rhineland-Palatinate. It was consecrated to Saint Severus. The institution, which was founded by the Conradines, had an important role in introducing Christianity to the Westerwald and is closely bound with the history of the Westerburg.

== Literature ==
- Hellmuth Gensicke (1999), Landesgeschichte des Westerwaldes (in German) (3rd ed.), Wiesbaden: Historische Kommission für Nassau, ISBN 3-922244-80-7
- Wolf-Heino Struck: Die Stifte St. Severus in Gemünden, St. Maria in Diez mit ihren Vorläufern, St. Petrus in Kettenbach, St. Adelphus in Salz (Germania Sacra. NF 25), Berlin: de Gruyter 1988
