= Schadeck Castle =

- Burg Schadeck
- Schadeck
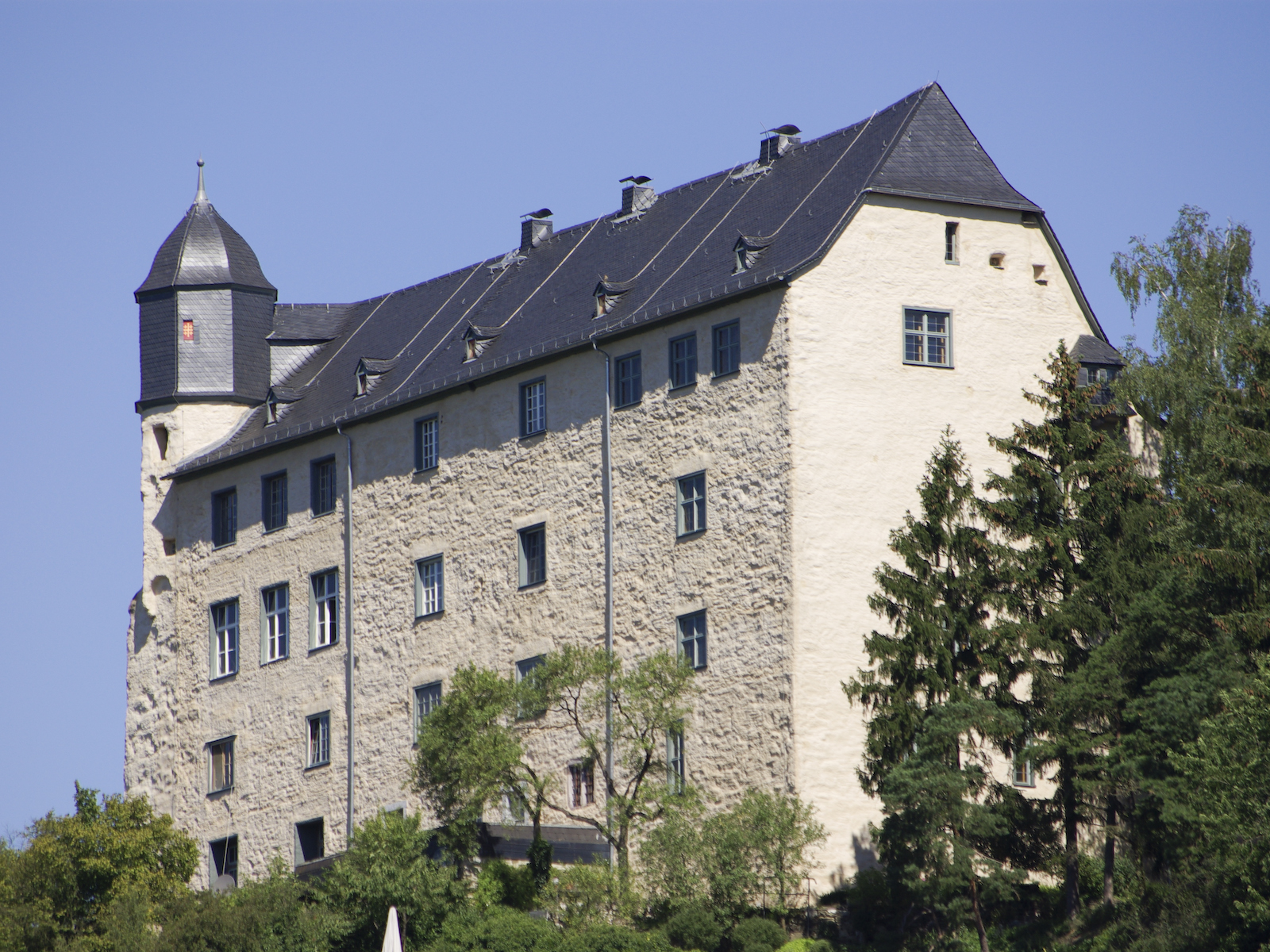
- Schadeck Castle

Site information
- Type: hill castle
- Code: DE-HE
- Condition: preserved or largely preserved

Location
- Coordinates: 50°24′30″N 8°09′20″E
- Height: Height missing, see template documentation

Site history
- Built: 1288

Garrison information
- Occupants: free nobility

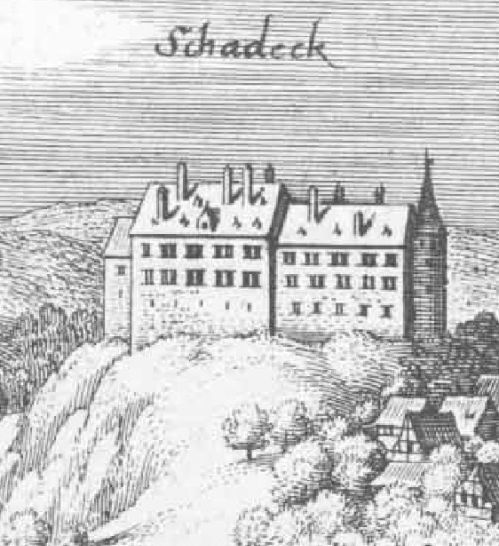
Schadeck – extract from Topographia Hassiae by Matthäus Merian, 1655

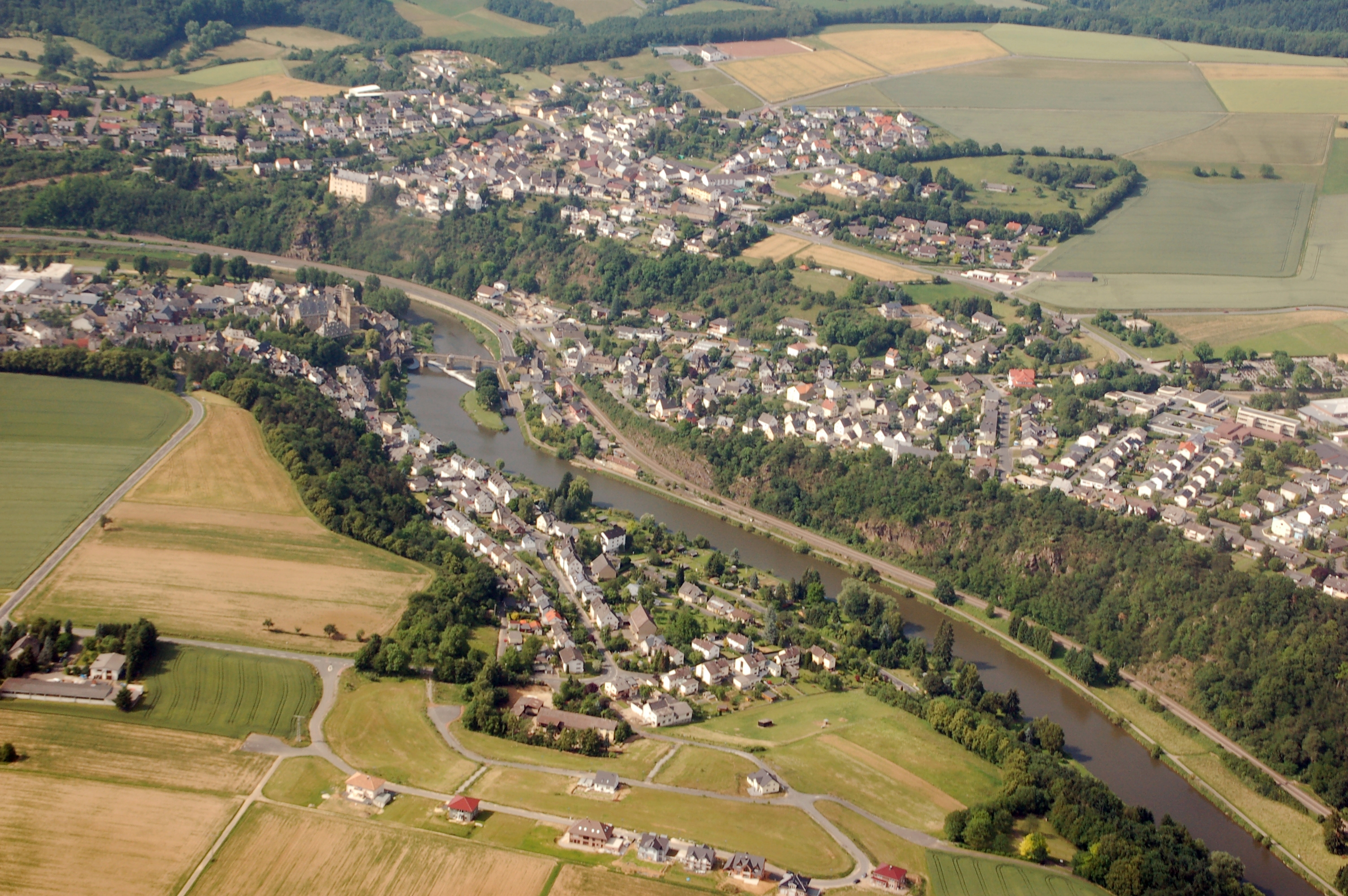
Aerial photograph of Runkel and Schadeck castles

Schadeck Castle (German: Burg Schadeck) is a counter-castle which was built in opposition to the nearby Runkel Castle. It stands above the River Lahn in the eponymous parish in the county of Limburg-Weilburg in the German state of Hesse.

== Location ==
The hill castle stands about 50 metres above the Lahn on a projecting hillside in the parish of Schadeck that was named after it within the borough of the small Hessian town of Runkel. The castle is about six kilometres east of Limburg and 60 kilometres northwest of Frankfurt.

== History ==
Because of inheritance and ownership disputes, Schadeck was built by Henry of Westerburg from 1276 to 1288 as a counter-castle to Runkel Castle, which at that time was owned by a cousin. The name of the castle and its surrounding settlement came from its purpose eine Ecke zum Schaden der Burg Runkel ("a spot from which to damage Runkel Castle"). However, Runkel Castle was never conquered. On 21 July 1321, an agreement was signed that forced the then Lord Reynard of Westerburg to hand over Runkel Castle as a fief to the Archbishop of Trier, Baldwin of Luxembourg. This was preceded by violent conflicts between the two parties later. However, the agreement was not carried out, so Baldwin captured the castle in 1344. The seizure of the castle was related to attempts by Baldwin to protect and expand his estates east of the Rhine. The disputes over Schadeck must have continued because, in 1346, another agreement was signed that provided for a division of the castle. In the same year, however, Reynard of Westerburg sold his entire share to the Archbishop. Apparently the Westerburgs remained as vassals of Baldwin at the castle. During the Thirty Years' War, and again in 1803, parts of the castle, especially the north wing, were slighted.

From the early 19th century the ownership of the castle changed hands several times. It was also divided between several owners. From 1821, the west wing housed the mayor's office of the municipality of Schadeck and, in about 1850, the village school was located on the second floor.

In the 20th century, the structural condition of the castle deteriorated rapidly, so that parts of the castle threatened to collapse. In 1998 extensive renovation work began, in particular the complete replacement of the roof and the framework of the baroque staircase. This work was completed in 2006.

== Description ==
The most important component of the present castle site is a well-preserved, 3 1/2-storey, rectangular building, which has a staircase tower on the western side. This contains private residences, which means that it is not possible to view the interior of Schadeck Castle.

Of the remaining buildings only a few remains and foundation walls have survived.

In addition to being a listed building, the castle is also protected in the event of war under the Hague Convention.

== Literature ==
- Rudolf Knappe: Mittelalterliche Burgen in Hessen: 800 Burgen, Burgruinen und Burgstätten. 3rd edn. Wartberg-Verlag, Gudensberg-Gleichen, 2000, ISBN 3-86134-228-6, p. 435.
- Alexander Thon, Stefan Ulrich, Jens Friedhoff: "Mit starken eisernen Ketten und Riegeln beschlossen ...". Burgen an der Lahn. Schnell & Steiner, Regensburg, 2008, ISBN 978-3-7954-2000-0, pp. 136–139.
- Hessendienst der Staatskanzlei (publ.): Schlösser, Burgen, alte Mauern. Wiesbaden 1990, ISBN 3-89214-017-0, p. 309.
