= Johann Friedrich Alexander, Prince of Wied =

Johann Friedrich Alexander of Wied
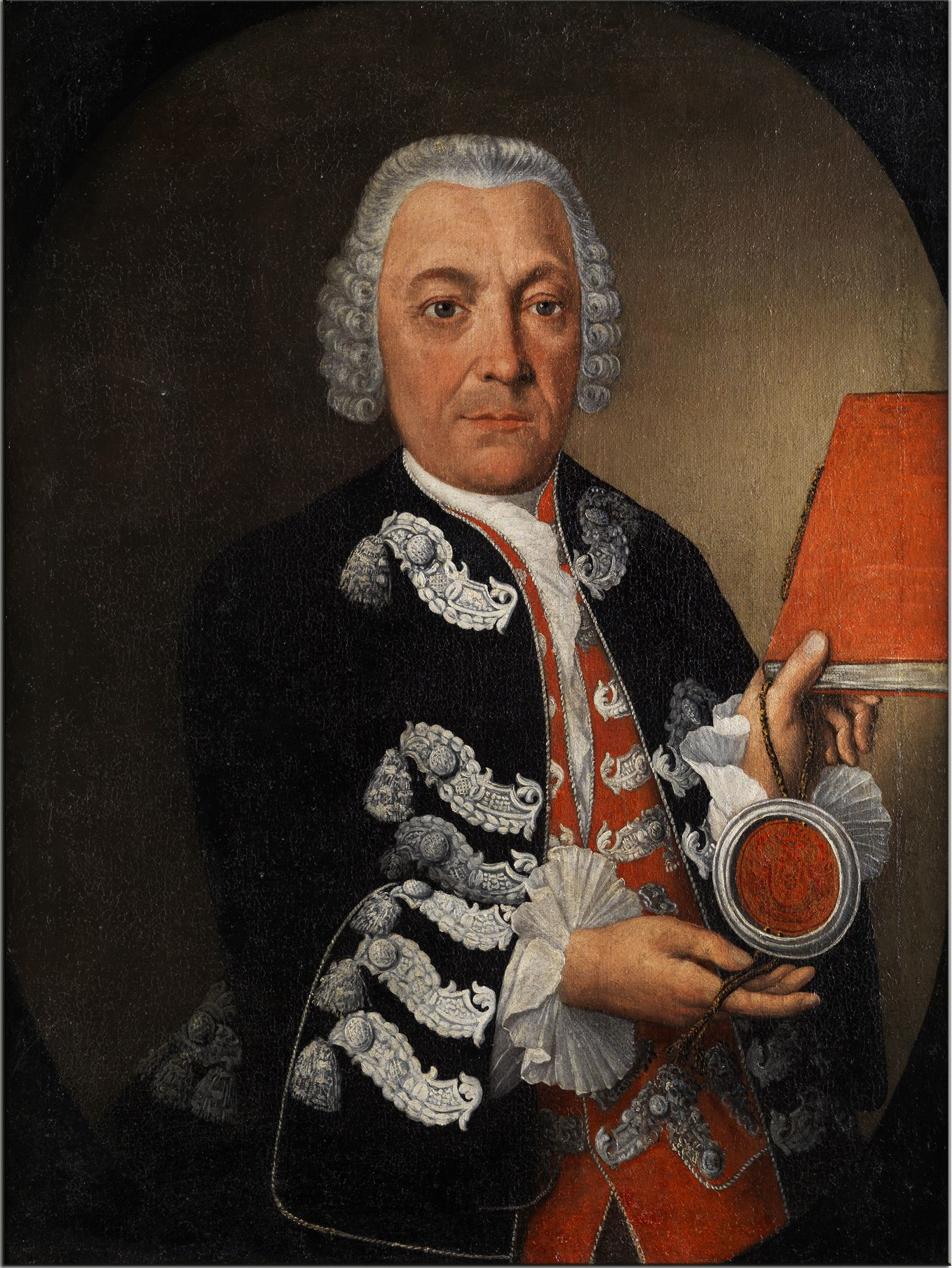
- Born: November 18, 1706
- Died: August 7, 1791 (aged 84)
- Spouse: Karoline von Kirchberg, Gräfin von Sayn-Hachenburg (1720–1795)

Johann Friedrich Alexander of Weid (November 18, 1706 - August 7, 1791) was a German ruler. He was the son of Count Friedrich Wilhelm of Wied and Countess Luise Charlotte of Dohna-Schlobitten. He was Count of Wied-Neuwied from September 17, 1737, to May 29, 1784, when he was elevated to the rank of Sovereign Prince of the Holy Roman Empire and continued to rule in that capacity until his death in August 1791.

== Life ==
In 1737, after his studies in Strasbourg and Königsberg, he was instrumental in the negotiation of the Vienna peace, which ended the War of the Polish Succession. When the title of prince was offered to him in 1738, however, he declined for financial reasons. In 1739 he married Caroline of Kirchberg (1720–1795), Countess of Sayn-Hachenburg; they had three children, whom only Count Friedrich Karl survived and succeeded in 1791 as Prince of Wied.

During his reign, Johann Friedrich Alexander of Wied sought to advance, socially and economically, the small territory of Wied-Neuwied. In the effort to win new citizens for the city of Neuwied, he permitted the establishment of numerous factories and workshops. He also organised a lottery, which allowed players to win houses in today's city dike. His governance was characterised by openness and religious tolerance. In 1750 he also permitted the establishment of the Moravian Church. He promoted the construction of a Mennonite church and a synagogue in Neuwied and wholly implemented the grandfather Frederick III's tolerant religious policy. For this reason, historian Max Braubach has described him as "one of the best representatives of enlightened absolutism in the Empire."

As Chairman of the Lower Rhenish-Westphalian Count College, Johann Friedrich Alexander was able to play a role in national politics. His success in mediating the dispute between the Protestant and Catholic Imperial Count led to his elevation to the rank of prince.
