= Maximilian Henry, Count of Wied-Runkel =

- Born: 1 May 1681
- Died: 19 December 1706 (aged 25)
- Noble family: House of Wied
- Spouse: Sophia Florentina of Lippe-Detmold
- Father: George Herman of Wied
- Mother: Johanna Elisabeth of Leiningen-Westerburg

Maximilian Henry, Count of Wied-Runkel (1 May 1681 – 19 December 1706) was a German nobleman. He was the ruling Count of Wied-Runkel from 1692 until his death.

== Life ==
He was a son of George Herman of Wied (1640-1690) and his second wife Johanna Elisabeth of Leiningen-Westerburg (1659-1708). He was the founder of the younger Wied-Runkel line.

On 27 August 1692, he received the Upper part of the County of Wied from his paternal grandfather Frederick the Elder, initially under guardianship. His part of the county included Altwied Castle, the village of Isenburg, the parish of Maysheid and the Lordship of Meud (which had previously been part of Lower Wied).

He served in the army of Landgrave Ernest Louis of Hesse-Darmstadt, where he climbed to the rank of Rittmeister.

He was killed in a duel on 19 December 1706. His underage son John Louis Adolph succeeded him as Count of Wied-Runkel.

== Marriage and issue ==
On 29 August 1704 in Detmold, he married Sophia Florentina (8 September 1683 – 23 April 1758), a daughter of Count Simon Henry of Lippe-Detmold. Together, they had two sons:

- John Louis Adolph (30 May 1705 – 18 May 1762)
- Charles William Emil Alexander (19 June 1706 – 30 November 1771)

== Footnotes ==
Maximilian Henry, Count of Wied-Runkel House of Wied Born: 1 May 1681 Died: 19 December 1706
Preceded by Frederick III	Count of Wied-Runkel; 1692-1706	Succeeded by John Louis Adolph
