= Runkel =

- Town
- Flag Coat of arms

- Location of Runkel within Limburg-Weilburg district
- Interactive map of Runkel
- Location within Germany Location within Hesse
- Coordinates: 50°24′19″N 8°09′18″E
- Country: Germany
- State: Hesse
- Admin. region: Gießen
- District: Limburg-Weilburg

Government
  - Mayor (2019–25): Michel Kremer (Ind.)

Area
  - Total: 43.71 km^{2} (16.88 sq mi)
- Elevation: 180 m (590 ft)

Population (2025-12-31)
  - Total: 9,428
  - Density: 215.7/km^{2} (558.6/sq mi)
- Time zone: UTC+01:00 (CET)
  - Summer (DST): UTC+02:00 (CEST)
- Postal codes: 65594
- Dialling codes: 06482, 06431, 06471
- Vehicle registration: LM
- Website: www.runkel-lahn.de

Hoisted flag of Runkel

Second banner of Runkel

Runkel (German pronunciation: [ˈʁʊŋkl̩]) is a town on the river Lahn in Limburg-Weilburg district in Hesse, Germany.

== Geography ==
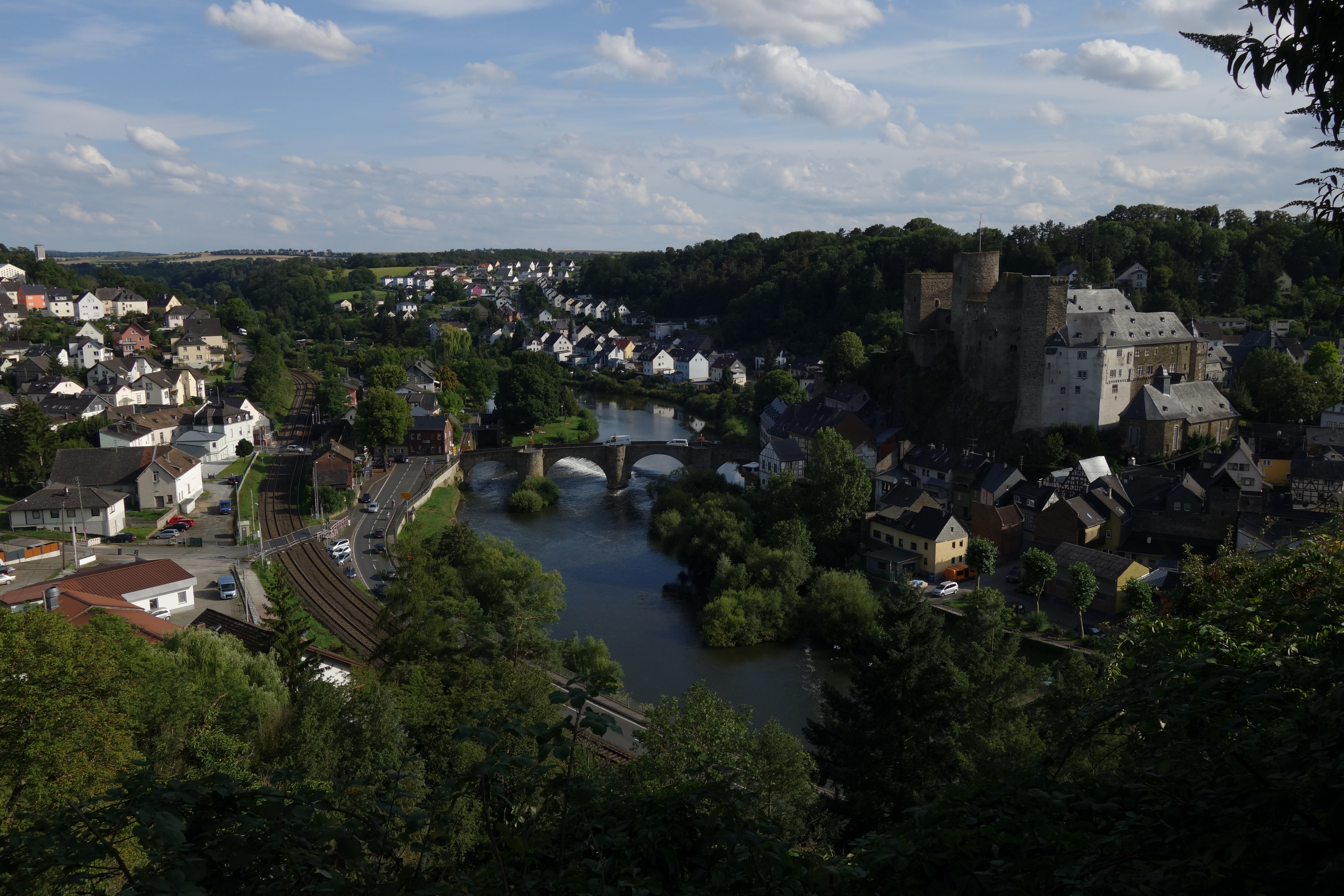
View from Schadeck Castle over Runkel

=== Location ===
Runkel lies in the Lahn Valley on both sides of the river between the Westerwald and the Taunus, some eight kilometres east of Limburg.

=== Neighbouring communities ===
Runkel borders in the north on the community of Beselich and the town of Weilburg, in the east on the communities of Weinbach and Villmar and in the south and west on the town of Limburg.

=== Constituent communities ===
The town consists of 9 Stadtteile.

Centre	Population 1910	Population 2005	Date of amalgamation
Runkel	1,109	1,655	1 December 1970
Schadeck	502	1,112	1 December 1970
Steeden	696	1,550	1 December 1970
Ennerich	317	865	1 December 1970
Dehrn	1,061	2,295	1 July 1974
Hofen	292	435	31 December 1970
Eschenau	214	320	31 December 1970
Arfurt	650	939	31 December 1970
Wirbelau	516	803	31 December 1970

== History ==
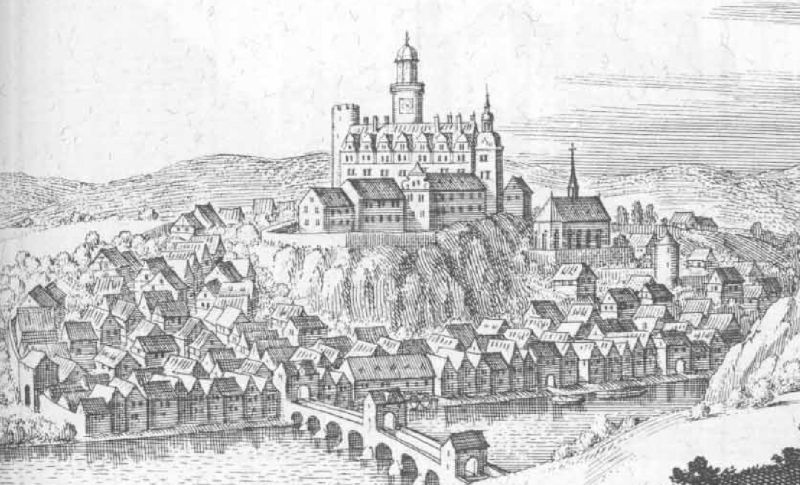
Runkel – extract from the Topographia Hassiae by Matthäus Merian 1655

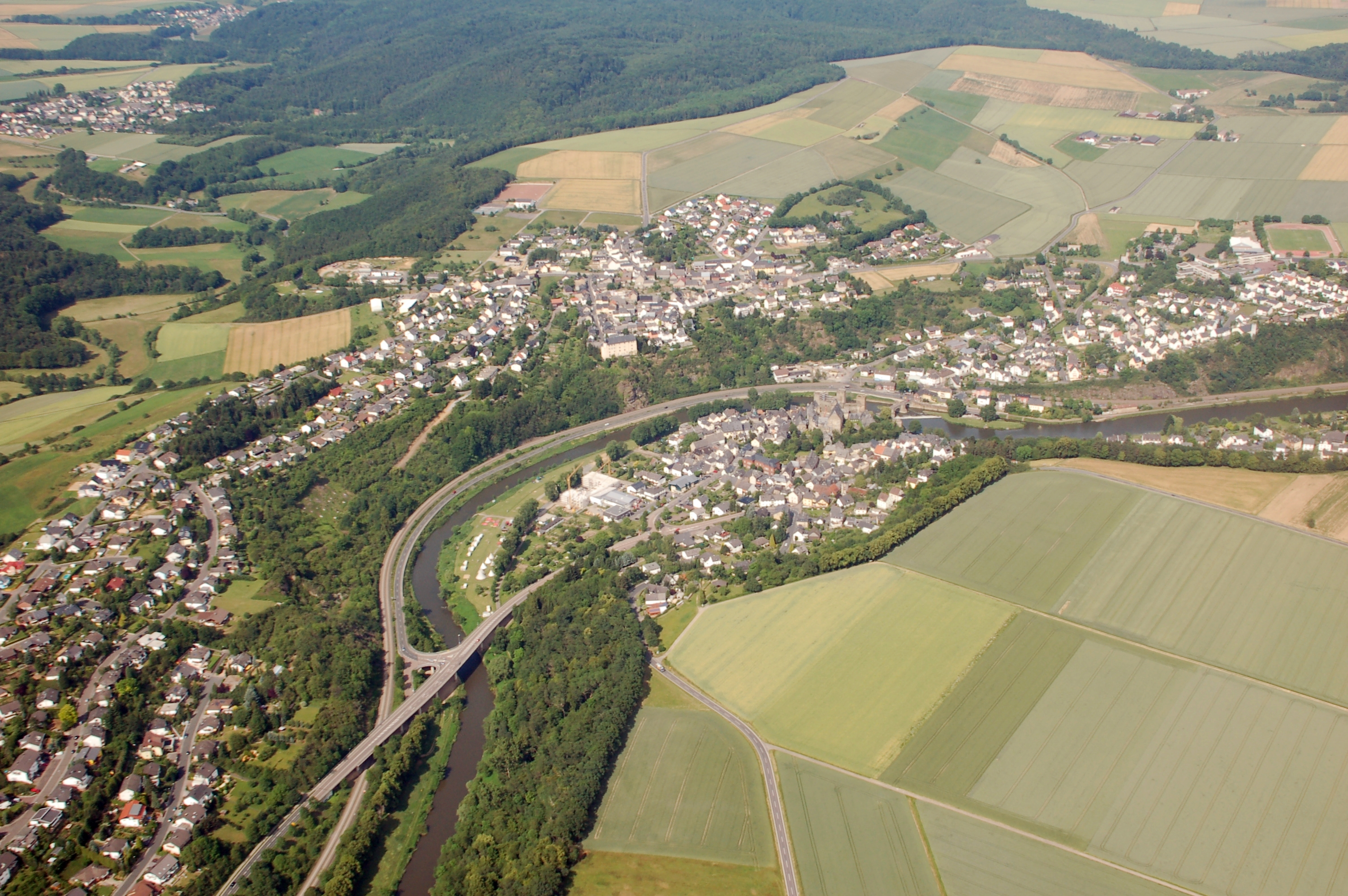
Aerial photograph 2007

The town's first documentary mention came in 1159 in an enfeoffment document in which a nobleman named Siegfried von Runkel had his name appear as a witness. It is believed that this Siegfried was the one who built Runkel Castle. In 1191 Siegfried married a countess of Katzenelnbogen. This high noble family forced Dietrich of Runkel to open his castles Runkel and Dehrn. No later than 1230, the castle had a chapel, thereby giving Runkel its first church building. In 1288, after years of family disputes, the Lords of Runkel and those of Westerburg sundered into two lines. In 1440, building work began on the Lahn bridge, but owing to the rift between the Runkels and the Westerburgs, the work took until 1448. In 1447 Count Philipp of Katzenelnbogen was the liege lord.

In 1543, Count Johann IV of Wied had Philipp Melanchthon as a guest at Runkel Castle. In 1568, the Reformation was introduced. In 1622, there was yet another family rift when Count Hermann II at Wied drove his younger brother Philipp Ludwig out of the leadership and indeed from the castle. In 1634, the town and the castle were largely destroyed by Count Johann Ludwig Hektor von Isolani's troops in the Thirty Years' War. In 1649, the castle's dwelling buildings were newly built as a residential castle.

In the early 18th century, continued French invasions combined with a record cold winter led many people from the Palatinate, including Runkel an Lahn, to emigrate down the Rhine River, then to England in 1709. There were so many refugees from the German Palatine region that the English government set up a tent city for the winter outside the London walls. In 1710 ten English ships carried nearly 3,000 Germans to the colony of New York. The people worked off their passage in camps on the Hudson River. In 1723 and later they were finally allowed to acquire land in New York's Mohawk Valley, where they established towns such as German Flatts and Palatine Bridge, New York.

In 1791, Friedrich Ludwig, the last of the Wied-Runkel line, was made a prince. In 1796, fighting in Runkel's streets broke out as troops of the Landgrave of Hesse-Darmstadt drove French revolutionary occupying soldiers out of town.

In 1806, the Runkel holdings on the Lahn's right bank, and thereby the part of the town of Runkel lying there, passed to the Duchy of Berg. In 1824, the Wied-Runkel line died out with Prince Friedrich Ludwig's death, putting the lordly domain, along with the town of Runkel, in Wied-Neuwied's hands.

Winegrowing is known to have been practised in Runkel by 1270. In 1929, however, it was given up after the phylloxera infestation and a cold winter. In the end, the vinicultural area amounted to 35 hectares.

In 1860, the first savings and loan association (Sparkasse) in Runkel was founded under the name Vorschuss-Verein (“Credit Club”). Since 1914 there has been a central water supply in the town.

In the course of administrative reform in Hesse, the formerly autonomous communities of Steeden, Ennerich and Schadeck merged on 1 December 1970, as did likewise Arfurt, Eschenau, Hofen and Wirbelau on 31 December 1970, with the town of Runkel. The community of Dehrn was only amalgamated on 1 July 1974 by state law.

The outlying centre with the earliest documentary mention is Ennerich, which can prove its existence in 790.

== Politics ==
=== Town council ===
The municipal election held on 26 March 2006 yielded the following results:

Parties and voter communities		% 2006	seats 2006	% 2001	seats 2001
CDU	Christian Democratic Union of Germany	42.4	13	42.5	13
SPD	Social Democratic Party of Germany	44.7	14	38.9	12
BL	Bürgerliste Runkel	12.9	4	14.2	5
GRÜNE	Bündnis 90/Die Grünen	–	–	4.4	1
Total		100.0	31	100.0	31
voter turnout in %		45.1		55.8	

Elections in 2016:

- CDU: 10
- SPD: 13
- GRÜNE: 1
- BL: 7
- Total: 31

== Culture and sightseeing ==
=== Buildings ===
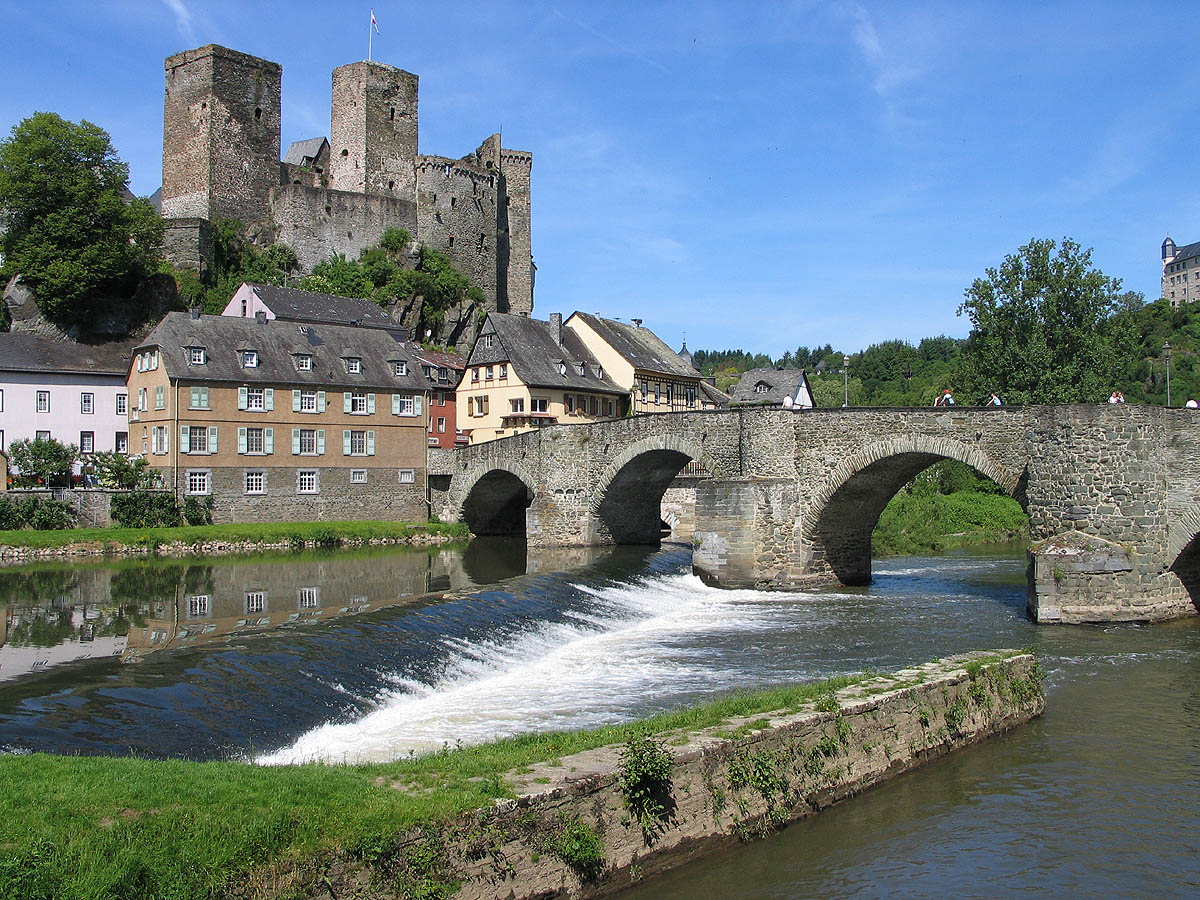
Runkel Castle above the Lahn

- The ruins of Runkel Castle from the 12th century, expanded in the 14th century, destroyed in 1634.
- The timber-frame houses from the 17th and 18th centuries
- The stone Lahn Bridge from the 13th century
- Schadeck Castle from the 13th century
- The Bannmühle was built jointly by Runkel and Schadeck upstream before the town wall. Since 1800 it has been privately owned. Since 1972 it has no longer been used as a mill, but rather for generating electricity, having been fitted with a turbine.
- The town wall's former watchtower today houses the Evangelical church's bells. It was destroyed by fire in 1634 and 1700. The first bell was hung in 1725; the last was installed in 1986.
- The parish school building, the first school in Runkel, comes from 1543.
- The former parish house was built in 1664, later passed into private ownership and was the town hall during the Second World War.
- The Evangelical church was built on the site of a former church that was built in 1511 and burnt down in 1634.
- In 1802, work began on a widow's seat for Prince Christian Ludwig's mother. When she died the next year, only the basement level had been finished. The site lay idle until the town bought it and from 1821 to 1825 built a new school building there that in the beginning also housed part of the municipal administration and a guardroom. Today the building houses a kindergarten.
- The Burgmannen-Sitz of the Barons of Schütz von Holzhausen was first mentioned in 1424. In 1651 the building was modernized. In 1718 it was owned by the Counts of Wied and served until 1811 as the official dwelling of their chancellory heads.
- Today's Amtsapotheke (Amt apothecary's shop) was built as a dwelling for an Amtmann ("bailiff"/"magistrate"). In 1818 the open (that is, not plastered) timber-frame building passed into the apothecary's ownership.
- The house of the old Latin school comes from 1711. After 1800 it was the town hall and until 1818 the court apothecary's shop. Later the “Zur Traube” guesthouse was located there.

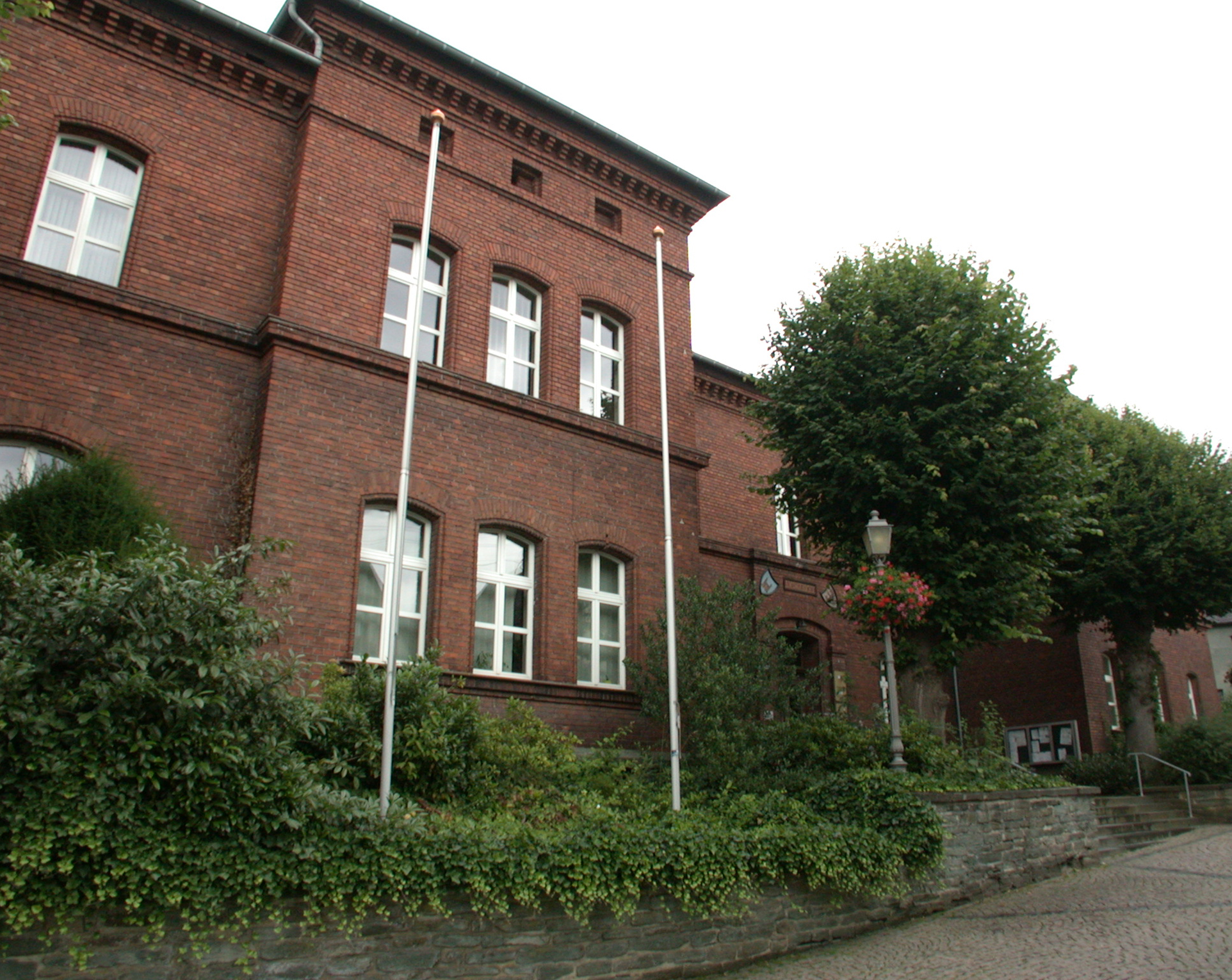
Runkel Town Hall, former Amt courthouse

- The town hall stands on the plot that was once the princely orange garden. From 1883 to 1887 work proceeded on the Prussian provincial administration building. The town hall has been there since 1966.
- The building that was once the Amt courthouse housed a brewery shortly after 1900 and the “Zum Adler” guesthouse.
- The fountain on Schlossplatz is said to be a model example for artistic cast iron works.
- The former princely stockyard with its tithe barn stands at Schlossplatz. It was built after the town was laid waste in the Thirty Years' War, and expanded in the 19th century. Today the fire station and clubhouse are found there.
- The old town hall stands on the site of the former Amtshaus that Count Wilhelm IV of Runkel-Wied had built in 1596 and later transferred to his court physician, Dr. Ersfeld. Ersfeld built the building anew after it had burnt down in the 1634 town fire, as did later his son, who succeeded him in his office, after the building burnt down once again in 1691. From 1787 to 1965 it was the town hall. Today it is privately owned.

== Economy and infrastructure ==
=== Transport ===
The town is linked to the long-distance road network through the Limburg-Süd interchange on the A 3 (Cologne–Frankfurt), 7 km away.

Runkel station and Arfurt (Lahn) station both lie within the municipality on the Lahntal railway (Koblenz-Limburg-Runkel-Wetzlar-Gießen) at which only regional trains stop. The town lies within the Rhein-Main-Verkehrsverbund area.

=== Education ===
In Runkel is found the Johann-Christian-Senckenberg-Schule. This is a primary school, Hauptschule and Realschule with a Förderstufe (a programme for streaming students into the secondary school best suited to their needs). It was named after the German physician and endower Johann Christian Senckenberg.

Further primary schools are found in Arfurt, Dehrn, Steeden and Runkel.

Students from Runkel also attend the Gymnasien in Limburg and Weilburg.

=== Public institutions ===
- Evangelische Kindertagesstätte "Pusteblume" Runkel (daycare)
- Katholischer Kindergarten "St. Michael" Arfurt
- Katholischer Kindergarten "St. Nikolaus" Dehrn
- Kindergarten "Regenbogenland" Ennerich
- Kindergarten "Konfetti" Steeden
- Kindergarten "Wirbelwind" Wirbelau
- Runkel Volunteer Fire Brigade, founded 1925 (includes Youth Fire Brigade)
- Arfurt Volunteer Fire Brigade, founded 1901 (includes Youth Fire Brigade)
- Dehrn Volunteer Fire Brigade, founded 1898 (includes Youth Fire Brigade)
- Ennerich Volunteer Fire Brigade, founded 1934 (includes Youth Fire Brigade)
- Eschenau Volunteer Fire Brigade, founded 1934 (includes Youth Fire Brigade)
- Hofen Volunteer Fire Brigade, founded 1934 (includes Youth Fire Brigade)
- Schadeck Volunteer Fire Brigade, founded 1933 (includes Youth Fire Brigade)
- Steeden Volunteer Fire Brigade, founded 1934 (includes Youth Fire Brigade)
- Wirbelau Volunteer Fire Brigade, founded 1934 (includes Youth Fire Brigade)
