= Wied-Neuwied =

Former microstate in northeastern Rhineland-Palatinate, part of the Holy Roman Empire

Coordinates: 50.42861°N 7.46139°E

County (Principality) of Wied-Neuwied Grafschaft (Fürstentum) Wied-Neuwied
- 1698–1806
- Coat of arms
- Status: State of the Holy Roman Empire
- Capital: Neuwied
- Government: Principality
- Historical era: Early modern period
  - Partitioned from Wied: 1698
  - Raised to principality: 1784
  - Mediatised to Nassau-Weilburg: 1806
  - Nassau annexed by Prussia: 1866
Preceded by	Succeeded by
Wied / County of Wied	Duchy of Nassau; Kingdom of Prussia

Version of the coat of arms of Wied-Neuwied

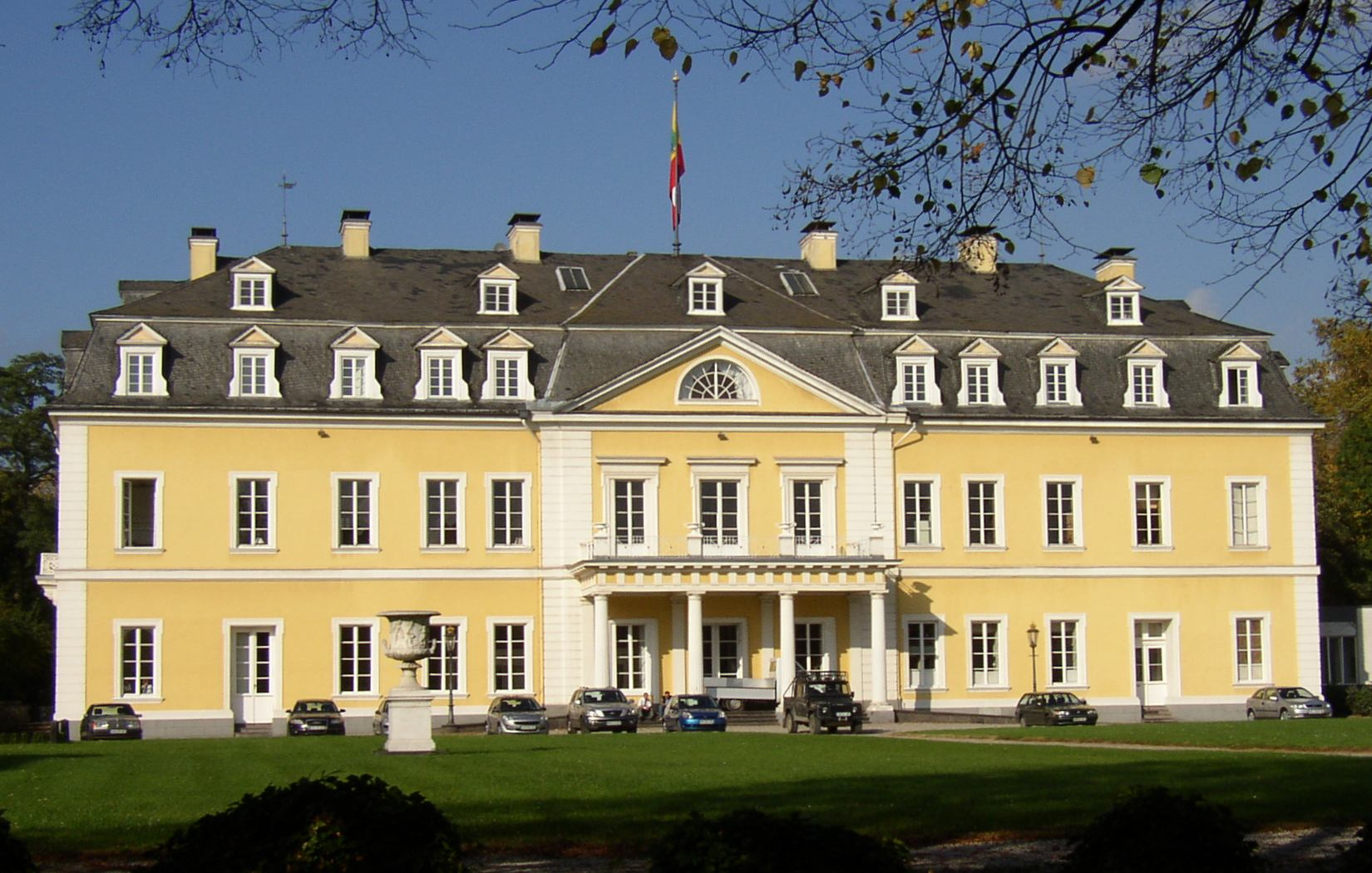
Neuwied Castle

Wied-Neuwied was a German statelet in northeastern Rhineland-Palatinate, Germany, located northeast of the Rhine River flanking the northern side of the city of Neuwied. Wied-Neuwied emerged from the partitioning of County of Wied. Its status was elevated from county to principality in 1784. It was mediatised to Nassau and Prussia in 1806.

== Principality of Albania ==
The House of Wied-Neuwied briefly ruled the Principality of Albania in 1914 through William of Albania, the younger son of Prince William. Among other notable members of the family were Prince Alexander Philip Maximilian, the second son of Prince John Frederick Alexander and a famous explorer, ethnologist and naturalist, and Princess Elisabeth, a daughter of Prince Hermann, who married King Carol I of Romania and became the first modern Queen consort of Romania.

== Counts of Wied-Neuwied (1698–1784) ==
- Frederick William, 1698–1737
- John Frederick Alexander, 1737–1784

== Princes of Wied-Neuwied (1784–1806) ==
- John Frederick Alexander, 1784–1791
- Frederick Charles, 1791–1802
- John Augustus, 1802–1806

== Heads of the House of Wied-Neuwied (1806–present) ==
- John Augustus, 3rd Prince 1806-1836 (1779–1836)
  - Hermann, 4th Prince 1836-1864 (1814–1864)
    - William, 5th Prince 1864-1907 (1845–1907)
      - William Frederick, 6th Prince 1907-1945 (1872–1945)
        - Hereditary Prince Hermann (1899-1941)
          - Friedrich William, 7th Prince 1945-2000 (1931-2000)
            - Prince Alexander (b.1960) - renounced rights
            - Carl, 8th Prince 2000-2015 (1961–2015)
              - Maximilian, 9th Prince 2015–present (b.1999)
              - Prince Friedrich (b.2001)
            - Prince Wolff-Heinrich (b.1979)
          - Prince Metfried (1935-2024)
            - Prince Christian (b.1968)
              - Prince Constantin (b.2003)
              - Prince Leopold (b.2006)
              - Prince Alexander (b.2007)
              - Prince Friedrich (b.2010)
            - Prince Magnus (b.1972)
        - Prince Dietrich (1901-1976)
          - Prince Ulrich (1931-2010)
            - Prince Wilhelm (b.1970)
              - Prince Friedrich (b.2001)
              - Prince George (b.2004)
              - Prince Philipp (b.2010)
          - Prince Ludwig-Eugen (1938-2001)
            - Prince Edzard (b.1968)
      - Wilhelm, Prince of Albania 1914 (1876–1945)
        - Carol Victor, Hereditary Prince of Albania (1917–1973)
