= County of Wied =

State of the Holy Roman Empire (1093–1243; 1462–1698)

County of Wied Grafschaft Wied
- 1093–1243; 1462–1698
- Coat of arms
- Status: State of the Holy Roman Empire
- Capital: Wied
- Government: Principality
- Historical era: Middle Ages
  - Established / Reichsfreiheit: 1093
  - Comital line extinct; passed to Isenburg-Wied: → 1243
  - Inherited by Lords of Runkel and restored: ← 1462
  - Partitioned to create Wied-Dierdorf: 1631
  - Partitioned into W-Neuwied, W-Runkel: 1698
  - Both parts mediatised to Nassau-Weilburg: → 1806
Preceded by
Duchy of Franconia
Succeeded by
Wied-Dierdorf
Wied-Neuwied
Wied-Runkel

Coat of arms of the Counts of Wied

The County of Wied (German pronunciation: [viːt]) was a territory of the Holy Roman Empire located on the river Wied where it meets the Rhine. Wied emerged as a County earlier than many other German states. From 1243–1462, Wied was united with an Isenburgian County as Isenburg-Wied. Wied was partitioned twice: between itself and Wied-Dierdorf in 1631, and between Wied-Neuwied and Wied-Runkel in 1698. The county was incorporated into the Duchy of Nassau in 1806 and into the Kingdom of Prussia at the Congress of Vienna in 1815. Since 1946, its territory has been part of the German state of Rhineland-Palatinate. Via William of Albania, the House of Wied ruled the Principality of Albania in 1914.

== Counts of Wied (c. 860–1243) ==
- Metfried (fl. 1100–1129)
- Siegfried (fl. 1145–1161)
- Theodoric (fl. 1158–c. 1200)
- George (c. 1200–1217), commander of the German crusaders of the Fifth Crusade
- Lothar (1217–1244)

To Isenburg-Wied (1243–1462)

== Counts of Wied (1462–1698) ==
- Frederick I (1462–87)
- William III, Count of Mörs (1487–1526) with...
- John I (1487–1533)
- Philip (1533–35)
- John II (1535–81)
- Herman I (1581–91) with...
- William IV (1581–1612) with...
- Herman II (1581–1631)
- Frederick II (1631–98)

Partitioned between Wied-Neuwied and Wied-Runkel

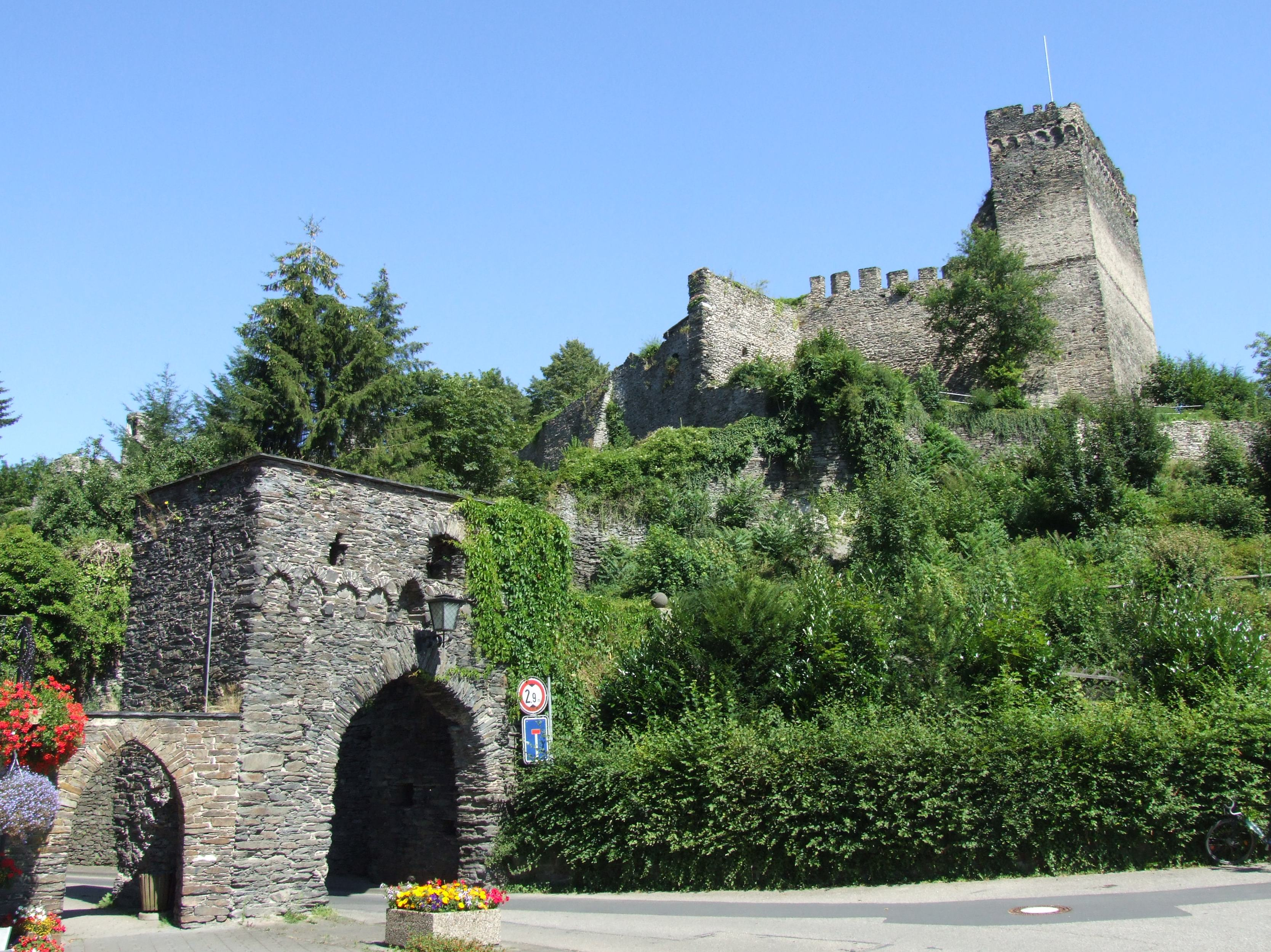
Altwied Castle

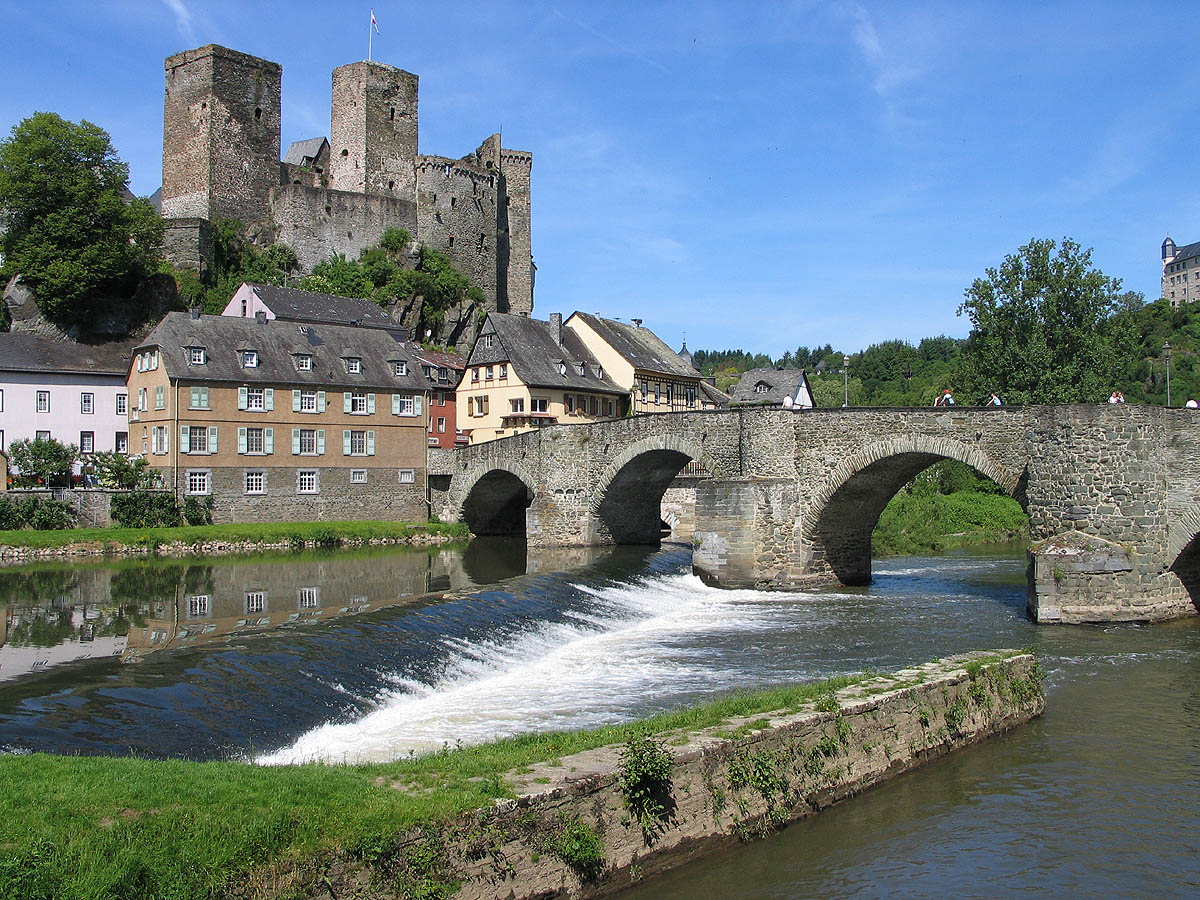
Runkel Castle, residence of the Upper County

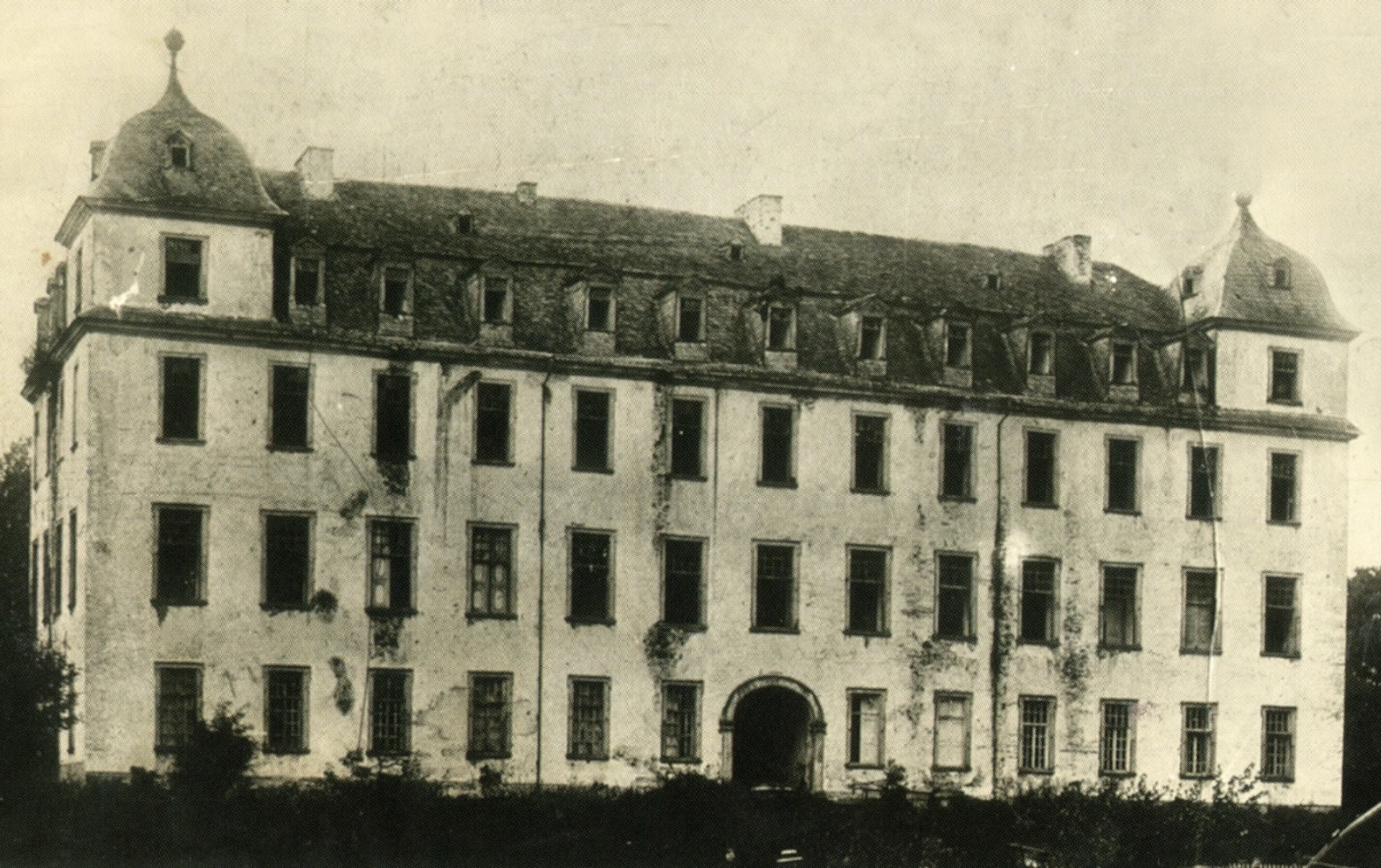
Dierdorf castle, another residence of the Upper County

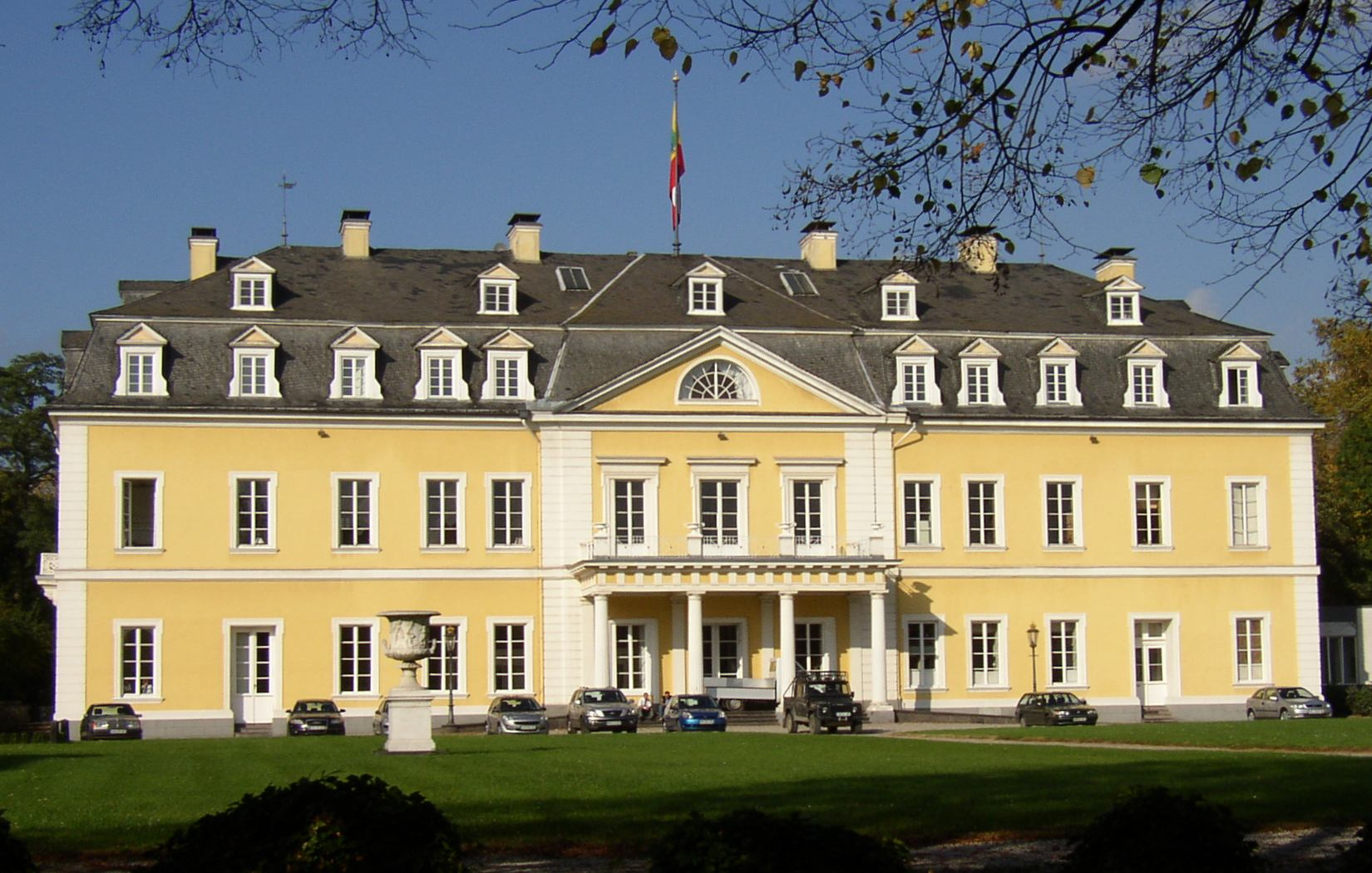
Neuwied Castle, residence of the Lower County
