= 39th New York State Legislature =

New York state legislative session

←	38th	40th	→
- The Old State Capitol (1879)

Overview
- Legislative body: New York State Legislature
- Jurisdiction: New York, United States
- Term: July 1, 1815 – June 30, 1816

Senate
- Members: 32
- President: Lt. Gov. John Tayler (Dem.-Rep.)
- Party control: Democratic-Republican (23-9)

Assembly
- Members: 126
- Speaker: Daniel Cruger (Dem.-Rep.)
- Party control: Dem.-Rep. (62-61) until February 6 Federalist (62-61) from February 7

Sessions
- 1st: January 30 – April 17, 1816

The 39th New York State Legislature, consisting of the New York State Senate and the New York State Assembly, met from January 30 to April 17, 1816, during the ninth year of Daniel D. Tompkins's governorship, in Albany.

== Background ==
Under the provisions of the New York Constitution of 1777, amended by the Constitutional Convention of 1801, 32 senators were elected on general tickets in the four senatorial districts for four-year terms. They were divided into four classes, and every year eight Senate seats came up for election. Assemblymen were elected countywide on general tickets to a one-year term, the whole Assembly being renewed annually.

In 1797, Albany was declared the State capital, and all subsequent Legislatures have been meeting there ever since. In 1799, the Legislature enacted that future Legislatures meet on the last Tuesday of January of each year unless called earlier by the governor.

State Senator Elbert H. Jones resigned on March 6, 1815, due to ill health, leaving a vacancy in the Southern District.

On April 8, 1815, the Legislature re-apportioned the Assembly districts, increasing the total number of assemblymen from 112 to 126. Genesee; Onondaga; Ontario and Seneca gained two seats each. Allegany & Steuben; Cattaraugus, Chautauqua & Niagara; Cayuga; Otsego; Rensselaer and Schoharie gained one seat each.

On April 17, 1815, the Legislature re-apportioned the Senate districts, to take effect in May 1815: Dutchess, Putnam and Rockland Co. (and 1 seat) were transferred from the Middle to the Southern District; Albany Co. from the Eastern, and Chenango, Otsego and Schoharie Co. from the Western (and 3 seats) were transferred to the Middle District; Herkimer, Jefferson, Lewis and St. Lawrence Co. (and 3 seats) were transferred from the Western to the Eastern District.

At this time the politicians were divided into two opposing political parties: the Federalists and the Democratic-Republicans.

== Elections ==
The State election was held from April 25 to 27, 1815.

Since the re-apportionment of the Senate districts had been enacted only a week before, and should take effect only in May 1815, the senators were elected under the previous apportionment. Peter R. Livingston, Isaac Ogden (both Middle D.), Henry J. Frey, Ralph Hascall, Abraham Van Vechten (all three Eastern D.), Henry Seymour, Stephen Bates (both Western D.); and Assemblyman David Allen (Eastern D.) were elected to full terms in the Senate. Jacob Barker (Southern D.) was elected to fill the vacancy. Allen, Frey, Hascall and Van Vechten were Federalists, the other five were Democratic-Republicans.

63 Democratic-Republicans and 63 Federalists were declared elected to the Assembly.

== Sessions ==
The Legislature met at the Old State Capitol in Albany on January 30, 1816, but assembled a quorum only on the next day when 123 assemblymen appeared, one had died and two were sick.

On January 31, Daniel Cruger (Dem.-Rep.) was elected Speaker with 61 votes against 60 for Jacob R. Van Rensselaer (Fed.), tradition had it that the candidates did not vote for themselves. Aaron Clark (Dem.-Rep.) was then re-elected Clerk of the Assembly with 62 votes against 59 for James Van Ingen (Fed.), one blank vote was cast and the Speaker did not vote except in case of a tie. The Assembly had thus a Democratic-Republican majority of one vote, 62 to 61.

Right after Speaker and Clerk had been elected, William Alexander Duer (Fed.) presented a petition on behalf of Henry Fellows (Fed.) to contest the election of Peter Allen (Dem.-Rep.) in Ontario County. Fellows had received 3,725 votes, including 49 votes cast in the Town of Perrington. Allen had received 3,695. Although the 49 Perrington votes had been cast for "Henry Fellows", and the election inspectors had filed the result thus with the Town Clerk, a copy returning the votes for "Hen. Fellows" was forwarded to the County Clerk who counted these votes as scattering, since it was not a perfect match with the other votes returned for "Henry Fellows". Without the 49 Perrington votes, Allen had a majority of 19 and was certified as elected. Seating Fellows in place of Allen was inevitable, and gave the Federalists a majority of one vote, but the Democratic-Republicans decided to put it off until after the election of the Council of Appointment.

When Duer's petition was put to a vote, John H. Beach (Dem.-Rep.) moved to postpone it until the next day. Duer objected, saying that the motion was not in order. Speaker Daniel Cruger (Dem.-Rep.) ruled that the motion was indeed in order. Thomas J. Oakley (Fed.) appealed the Speaker's ruling, and a viva voce vote was called on this appeal. When the Clerk prepared to call the roll, Duer moved that Peter Allen not be allowed to vote, since he was directly interested in the issue. The Speaker ruled that this motion was not in order. This ruling was appealed also, and a vote was called on this question. It was then moved that Peter Allen had no right to vote on this question, and the Speaker ruled that Allen had the right, which ruling was then appealed again. Then the Assembly adjourned.

On February 1, the Assembly re-elected the Sergeant-at-Arms and Doorkeeper of the previous session, and informed the Senate that the Assembly was organized and ready for business. Governor Daniel D. Tompkins (Dem.-Rep.) informed that he would address the Legislature with his annual message on the next day, and the Assembly adjourned. On February 2, the governor's message was read, and the Assembly adjourned.

On February 3, the question of the contested seat was taken up again. Henry Leavenworth (Dem.-Rep.) offered a resolution to elect "immediately" a Council of Appointment. Answering that, James Lynch (Fed.) offered a resolution that the election of the Council be postponed until after the decision of the question of the contested seat. The Speaker ruled that Lynch's resolution was not in order, which was confirmed by a vote of the Assembly. Oakley then moved to amend Leavenworth's resolution, changing "immediately" to "on Wednesday next, and that in the meantime, the house would consider the right of Peter Allen to his seat". A vote on this amendment was called, and Peter A. Jay (Fed.) moved to exclude Peter Allen from the vote. The Speaker ruled that this motion was not in order, which ruling was appealed by Oakley, and the Assembly adjourned.

On February 5, the struggle continued. Duer moved that Peter Allen not be allowed to vote on Oakley's appeal. The Speaker ruled that Duer's motion was not in order, which was appealed by Duer himself. A vote was called, and the Assembly voted 61 to 61 (included Peter Allen's vote), and the Speaker voted in favor of his own decision, declaring Duer's appeal to be lost. After many more motions, countermotions, and votes which ended all in the same manner as aforementioned, Leavenworth's original resolution was adopted with the vote of Peter Allen, and the casting vote of the Speaker. A new Council of Appointment was elected, the vote being: Darius Crosby 63; Archibald S. Clarke 62; William Ross 61; Perley Keyes 61; Abraham Van Vechten 61; Gerrit Wendell 61; Henry Seymour 61 and Samuel G. Verbryck 47. Ross and Keyes were elected by the casting vote of the Speaker, resulting in the election of four Democratic-Republicans.

On February 6, the Assembly Committee on elections reported the abovementioned facts concerning the election of Peter Allen, and unanimously recommended that Fellows be seated instead of Allen. The Assembly concurred with a vote of 115 to 1, and Fellows was seated the next day, giving the Federalists now a majority of 1 after a Democratic-Republican Speaker, Clerk and Council of Appointment had been elected.

On April 17, 1816, a new Erie Canal Commission was appointed: Commissioners Stephen Van Rensselaer and DeWitt Clinton remained in office; and Samuel Young, Assemblyman Myron Holley and Joseph Ellicott were added. Later this day the Legislature adjourned.

== State Senate ==
Under the re-apportionment of April 17, 1815, the State senators already in office and the senators elected at the last election should represent the District in which they resided. Thus the senators, when taking their seats at the next session in January 1816, were grouped as the table shows below. This led to a different number of seats per district as apportioned, which was corrected at the next election.

=== Districts ===
- The Southern District (6 seats) consisted of Dutchess, Kings, New York, Putnam, Queens, Richmond, Rockland, Suffolk and Westchester counties.
- The Middle District (8 seats) consisted of Albany, Chenango, Columbia, Delaware, Greene, Orange, Otsego, Schoharie, Sullivan and Ulster counties.
- The Eastern District (10 seats) consisted of Clinton, Essex, Franklin, Herkimer, Jefferson, Lewis, Montgomery, Rensselaer, St. Lawrence, Saratoga, Schenectady, Warren and Washington counties.
- The Western District (8 seats) consisted of Allegany, Broome, Cattaraugus, Cayuga, Chautauqua, Cortland, Genesee, Madison, Niagara, Oneida, Onondaga, Ontario, Seneca, Steuben and Tioga counties.
Note: There are now 62 counties in the State of New York. The counties which are not mentioned in this list had not yet been established, or sufficiently organized, the area being included in one or more of the abovementioned counties.

=== Members ===
The asterisk (*) denotes members of the previous Legislature who continued in office as members of this Legislature. David Allen changed from the Assembly to the Senate.

District	Senators	Term left	Party	Notes
Southern	Jacob Barker	1 year	Dem.-Rep.	elected to fill vacancy, in place of Elbert H. Jones
Southern	Peter W. Radcliff*	1 year	Federalist	
Southern	Jonathan Dayton*	2 years	Dem.-Rep.	
Southern	Samuel G. Verbryck*	2 years	Dem.-Rep.	resided in Rockland Co., elected in the Middle D. in 1813
Southern	Darius Crosby*	3 years	Dem.-Rep.	elected to the Council of Appointment
Southern	Peter R. Livingston	4 years	Dem.-Rep.	resided in Dutchess Co., elected in the Middle D. in 1815
Middle	Henry Hager*	1 year	Dem.-Rep.	resided in Schoharie Co., elected in the Western D. in 1812
Middle	Martin Van Buren*	1 year	Dem.-Rep.	also New York Attorney General
Middle	Lucas Elmendorf*	2 years	Dem.-Rep.	
Middle	Farrand Stranahan*	2 years	Dem.-Rep.	resided in Otsego Co., elected in the Western D. in 1813
Middle	Moses I. Cantine*	3 years	Dem.-Rep.	
Middle	William Ross*	3 years	Dem.-Rep.	elected to the Council of Appointment
Middle	Isaac Ogden	4 years	Dem.-Rep.	
Middle	Abraham Van Vechten	4 years	Federalist	resided in Albany Co., elected in the Eastern D. in 1815
Eastern	Russell Attwater*	1 year	Dem.-Rep.	resided in St. Lawrence Co., elected in the Western D. in 1812
Eastern	Gerrit Wendell*	1 year	Federalist	
Eastern	James Cochran*	2 years	Federalist	
Eastern	Perley Keyes*	2 years	Dem.-Rep.	resided in Jefferson Co., elected in the Western D. in 1813; elected to the Council of Appointment
Eastern	Samuel Stewart*	2 years	Federalist	
Eastern	John J. Prendergast*	3 years	Dem.-Rep.	resided in Herkimer Co., elected in the Western D. in 1814
Eastern	George Tibbits*	3 years	Federalist	
Eastern	David Allen*	4 years	Federalist	
Eastern	Henry J. Frey	4 years	Federalist	
Eastern	Ralph Hascall	4 years	Federalist	
Western	Francis A. Bloodgood*	1 year	Dem.-Rep.	
Western	Archibald S. Clarke*	1 year	Dem.-Rep.	elected to the Council of Appointment; in April 1816, elected to the 14th United States Congress
Western	Henry Bloom*	2 years	Dem.-Rep.	
Western	Bennett Bicknell*	3 years	Dem.-Rep.	
Western	Chauncey Loomis*	3 years	Dem.-Rep.	
Western	Philetus Swift*	3 years	Dem.-Rep.	
Western	Stephen Bates	4 years	Dem.-Rep.	
Western	Henry Seymour	4 years	Dem.-Rep.	

=== Employees ===
- Clerk: John F. Bacon

== State Assembly ==
=== Districts ===
- Albany County (4 seats)
- Allegany and Steuben counties (2 seats)
- Broome County (1 seat)
- Cattaraugus, Chautauqua and Niagara counties (2 seats)
- Cayuga County (4 seats)
- Chenango County (3 seats)
- Clinton and Franklin counties (1 seat)
- Columbia County (4 seats)
- Cortland County (1 seat)
- Delaware County (2 seats)
- Dutchess County (5 seats)
- Essex County (1 seat)
- Genesee County (3 seats)
- Greene County (2 seats)
- Herkimer County (3 seats)
- Jefferson County (2 seats)
- Kings County (1 seat)
- Lewis County (1 seat)
- Madison County (3 seats)
- Montgomery County (5 seats)
- The City and County of New York (11 seats)
- Oneida County (5 seats)
- Onondaga County (4 seats)
- Ontario County (7 seats)
- Orange County (4 seats)
- Otsego County (5 seats)
- Putnam County (1 seat)
- Queens County (3 seats)
- Rensselaer County (5 seats)
- Richmond County (1 seat)
- Rockland County (1 seat)
- St. Lawrence County (1 seat)
- Saratoga County (4 seats)
- Schenectady County (2 seats)
- Schoharie County (3 seats)
- Seneca County (3 seats)
- Suffolk County (3 seats)
- Sullivan and Ulster counties (4 seats)
- Tioga County (1 seat)
- Warren and Washington counties (5 seats)
- Westchester County (3 seats)
Note: There are now 62 counties in the State of New York. The counties which are not mentioned in this list had not yet been established, or sufficiently organized, the area being included in one or more of the abovementioned counties.

=== Assemblymen ===
The asterisk (*) denotes members of the previous Legislature who continued as members of this Legislature.

District	Assemblymen	Party	Notes
Albany	Michael Freligh	Federalist	
Albany	John J. Ostrander	Federalist	
Albany	John Schoolcraft	Federalist	
Albany	Jesse Smith	Federalist	
Allegany and Steuben	Daniel Cruger*	Dem.-Rep.	elected Speaker; in April 1816, elected to the 15th United States Congress
Allegany and Steuben	Timothy H. Porter		
Broome	Mason Whiting	Federalist	
Cattaraugus, Chautauqua and Niagara	(Daniel McCleary)	Dem.-Rep.	died on January 2, 1816, before the Legislature met
Cattaraugus, Chautauqua and Niagara	Elias Osborn	Dem.-Rep.	previously a member from Delaware Co.?
Cayuga	John H. Beach*	Dem.-Rep.	
Cayuga	John Brown Jr.	Dem.-Rep.	
Cayuga	John McFadden	Dem.-Rep.	
Cayuga	Barnabas Smith*	Dem.-Rep.	
Chenango	Thomas Brown		
Chenango	William Munro		
Chenango	Russel Waters		
Clinton and Franklin	Benjamin Mooers	Dem.-Rep.	
Columbia	Henry Livingston*	Federalist	
Columbia	James Vanderpoel	Federalist	
Columbia	Jacob R. Van Rensselaer*	Federalist	
Columbia	John Whiting		
Cortland	Joshua Ballard	Dem.-Rep.	
Delaware	William Dewey		
Delaware	Henry Leavenworth	Dem.-Rep.	
Dutchess	William Alexander Duer*	Federalist	
Dutchess	Zachariah Hoffman	Federalist	
Dutchess	Thomas J. Oakley	Federalist	
Dutchess	Isaac Smith	Federalist	
Dutchess	John B. Van Wyck	Federalist	
Essex	Reuben Sanford*	Dem.-Rep.	
Genesee	James Ganson	Dem.-Rep.	the only member who voted against seating Fellows
Genesee	Elizur Webster	Dem.-Rep.	
Genesee	John Wilson	Dem.-Rep.	
Greene	James Powers	Federalist	
Greene	Jacob Roggen	Federalist	
Herkimer	William D. Ford	Dem.-Rep.	
Herkimer	Henry Hopkins	Federalist	
Herkimer	John McCombs*	Dem.-Rep.	
Jefferson	Abel Cole		
Jefferson	Amos Stebbins		
Kings	(Richard Fish)	Dem.-Rep.	did not attend due to illness
Lewis	Chillus Doty		
Madison	Oliver Brown	Federalist	
Madison	Nathan Hall Jr.		
Madison	Eliphalet S. Jackson		
Montgomery	Nathan Christie		
Montgomery	Nathan Kimball		
Montgomery	Edmund G. Rawson		
Montgomery	Richard Van Horne	Federalist	
Montgomery	William Woodward		
New York	Joseph Bayley		
New York	Philip Brasher		
New York	Peter A. Jay	Federalist	
New York	Edward W. Laight		
New York	Andrew Morris		
New York	James Palmer		
New York	Joseph Smith*		
New York	Thomas C. Taylor		
New York	George Warner*	Dem.-Rep.	
New York	Samuel Whittmore		
New York	Augustus Wynkoop		
Oneida	Isaac Brayton	Federalist	
Oneida	Jesse Curtiss		
Oneida	James Lynch*	Federalist	
Oneida	Roderick Morrison		
Oneida	Richard Sanger		
Onondaga	Truman Adams	Dem.-Rep.	
Onondaga	George Hall	Dem.-Rep.	
Onondaga	Elijah Miles	Dem.-Rep.	
Onondaga	Nathan Williams	Dem.-Rep.	
Ontario	Peter Allen*	Dem.-Rep.	contested by Henry Fellows (Fed.) who was seated on February 7, 1816
Ontario	Israel Chapin		
Ontario	Jonathan Child		
Ontario	Myron Holley		on April 17, 1816, appointed to the Erie Canal Commission
Ontario	Alexander Kelsey		
Ontario	Thomas Lee		
Ontario	Roger Sprague		
Orange	James Burt	Federalist	
Orange	David Dill		
Orange	Nathaniel P. Hill	Dem.-Rep.	
Orange	Selah Strong	Dem.-Rep.	
Otsego	William Campbell	Federalist	
Otsego	Silas Crippen	Dem.-Rep.	
Otsego	Isaac Hayes	Dem.-Rep.	
Otsego	Oliver Judd	Dem.-Rep.	
Otsego	Arunah Metcalf*	Dem.-Rep.	
Putnam	Henry B. Lee	Dem.-Rep.	in April 1816, elected to the 15th United States Congress
Queens	Stephen Carman*	Federalist	
Queens	William Jones	Federalist	
Queens	Daniel Kissam*	Federalist	
Rensselaer	Job Greene	Federalist	
Rensselaer	David A. Gregory	Federalist	
Rensselaer	Herman Knickerbocker	Federalist	
Rensselaer	Samuel McChestney	Federalist	
Rensselaer	Samuel Milliman	Federalist	
Richmond	Richard Coursin	Dem.-Rep.	
Rockland	Cornelius A. Blauvelt		
St. Lawrence	William W. Bowen		
Saratoga	Asa C. Barney	Dem.-Rep.	
Saratoga	George Cramer	Dem.-Rep.	
Saratoga	Isaac Gere	Dem.-Rep.	
Saratoga	William Hamilton	Federalist	
Schenectady	Henry Fryer	Dem.-Rep.	
Schenectady	Herman A. Van Slyck	Dem.-Rep.	
Schoharie	William C. Bouck*	Dem.-Rep.	
Schoharie	Peter A. Hilton		
Schoharie	Thomas Lawyer	Dem.-Rep.	in April 1816, elected to the 15th United States Congress
Seneca	Nichol Halsey		
Seneca	Jacob L. Larzelere		
Seneca	William Thompson	Dem.-Rep.	
Suffolk	Phineas Carll		
Suffolk	Abraham Rose	Dem.-Rep.	
Suffolk	Benjamin F. Thompson		
Sullivan and Ulster	Aaron Adams		
Sullivan and Ulster	Green Miller		
Sullivan and Ulster	William Parks		
Sullivan and Ulster	Dirck Westbrook		
Tioga	Gamaliel H. Barstow	Dem.-Rep.	
Warren and Washington	Michael Harris		
Warren and Washington	John Reid		
Warren and Washington	David Abel Russell	Federalist	
Warren and Washington	James Stevenson		
Warren and Washington	Roswell Weston		
Westchester	Benjamin Isaacs*	Federalist	
Westchester	Abraham Miller	Dem.-Rep.	
Westchester	William Requa*	Federalist	

=== Employees ===
- Clerk: Aaron Clark
- Sergeant-at-Arms: Thomas Donnelly
- Doorkeeper: Benjamin Whipple

== Sources ==
- The New York Civil List compiled by Franklin Benjamin Hough (Weed, Parsons and Co., 1858) [see pg. 108f for Senate districts; pg. 122 for senators; pg. 148f for Assembly districts; pg. 190f for assemblymen]
- The History of Political Parties in the State of New-York, from the Ratification of the Federal Constitution to 1840 by Jabez D. Hammond (4th ed., Vol. 1, H. & E. Phinney, Cooperstown, 1846; pages 401-428)
- Election result Assembly, Albany Co. at project "A New Nation Votes", compiled by Phil Lampi, hosted by Tufts University Digital Library
- Election result Assembly, Broome Co. at project "A New Nation Votes"
- Election result Assembly, Cattaraugus, Chautauqua and Niagara Co. at project "A New Nation Votes"
- Election result Assembly, Cayuga Co. at project "A New Nation Votes"
- Election result Assembly, Clinton and Franklin Co. at project "A New Nation Votes"
- Election result Assembly, Cortland Co. at project "A New Nation Votes"
- Election result Assembly, Dutchess Co. at project "A New Nation Votes"
- Election result Assembly, Essex Co. at project "A New Nation Votes"
- Election result Assembly, Genesee Co. at project "A New Nation Votes"
- Election result Assembly, Greene Co. at project "A New Nation Votes"
- Election result Assembly, Herkimer Co. at project "A New Nation Votes"
- Election result Assembly, Kings Co. at project "A New Nation Votes"
- Election result Assembly, Onondaga Co. at project "A New Nation Votes"
- Election result Assembly, Queens Co. at project "A New Nation Votes"
- Election result Assembly, Rensselaer Co. at project "A New Nation Votes"
- Election result Assembly, Richmond Co. at project "A New Nation Votes"
- Election result Assembly, Rockland Co. at project "A New Nation Votes"
- Election result Assembly, Schenectady Co. at project "A New Nation Votes"
- Election result Assembly, Westchester Co. at project "A New Nation Votes" [gives wrong result]
- Election result Senate, Southern D. at project "A New Nation Votes"
- Election result Senate, Middle D. at project "A New Nation Votes"
- Election result Senate, Eastern D. at project "A New Nation Votes"
- Election result Senate, Western D. at project "A New Nation Votes"
- Election result, Speaker at project "A New Nation Votes" [gives wrong party affiliations]
- Election result, Assembly Clerk at project "A New Nation Votes"
