= 38th New York State Legislature =

New York state legislative session

←	37th	39th	→
- The Old State Capitol (1879)

Overview
- Legislative body: New York State Legislature
- Jurisdiction: New York, United States
- Term: July 1, 1814 – June 30, 1815

Senate
- Members: 32
- President: Lt. Gov. John Tayler (Dem.-Rep.)
- Party control: Democratic-Republican (26-6)

Assembly
- Members: 112
- Speaker: Samuel Young (Dem.-Rep.)
- Party control: Democratic-Republican (62-35)

Sessions
- 1st: September 26 – October 24, 1814
- 2nd: January 31 – April 18, 1815

The 38th New York State Legislature, consisting of the New York State Senate and the New York State Assembly, met from September 26, 1814, to April 18, 1815, during the eighth year of Daniel D. Tompkins's governorship, in Albany.

== Background ==
Under the provisions of the New York Constitution of 1777, amended by the Constitutional Convention of 1801, 32 Senators were elected on general tickets in the four senatorial districts for four-year terms. They were divided into four classes, and every year eight Senate seats came up for election. Assemblymen were elected countywide on general tickets to a one-year term, the whole Assembly being renewed annually.

In 1797, Albany was declared the State capital, and all subsequent Legislatures have been meeting there ever since. In 1799, the Legislature enacted that future Legislatures meet on the last Tuesday of January of each year unless called earlier by the governor.

State Senator John Tayler had been elected Lieutenant Governor of New York in 1813, leaving a vacancy in the Eastern District.

At this time the politicians were divided into two opposing political parties: the Federalists and the Democratic-Republicans.

== Elections ==
The State election was held from April 26 to 28, 1814. Senator Philetus Swift (Western D.) was re-elected. Darius Crosby (Southern D.), Moses I. Cantine (Middle D.), George Tibbits (Eastern D.), Bennett Bicknell, Chauncey Loomis, John J. Prendergast (all three Western D.); and Assemblyman William Ross (Middle D.) were also elected to full terms in the Senate. Guert Van Schoonhoven (Eastern D.) was elected to fill the vacancy. Tibbits was a Federalist, the other eight were Democratic-Republicans.

== Sessions ==
The Legislature met at the Old State Capitol in Albany on September 26, 1814, to enact legislation concerning the War against Great Britain; and adjourned on October 24.

Samuel Young (Dem.-Rep.) was elected Speaker with 61 votes against 35 for James Emott (Fed.). Aaron Clark (Dem.-Rep.) was elected Clerk of the Assembly with 60 votes against 37 for James Van Ingen (Fed.). At the end of this session, Jesse Buel was appointed by the Legislature to succeed Solomon Southwick as State Printer.

The Legislature met for the regular session on January 31, 1815; and adjourned on April 18.

On January 31, the Dem.-Rep. Assembly majority elected a new Council of Appointment which removed almost all Federalist officeholders.

On February 7, the Legislature elected State Senator Nathan Sanford (Dem.-Rep.) to succeed Obadiah German (Dem.-Rep.) as U.S. Senator from New York.

On April 8, 1815, the Legislature re-apportioned the Assembly districts, increasing the total number of assemblymen from 112 to 126.

On April 17, 1815, the Legislature re-apportioned the Senate districts: Dutchess, Putnam and Rockland Co. (and 1 seat) were transferred from the Middle to the Southern District; Albany Co. from the Eastern, and Chenango, Otsego and Schoharie Co. from the Western (and 3 seats) were transferred to the Middle District; Herkimer, Jefferson, Lewis and St. Lawrence Co. (and 3 seats) were transferred from the Western to the Eastern District. It was however too late to use this new apportionment at the State election held later this month.

== State Senate ==
=== Districts ===
- The Southern District (5 seats) consisted of Kings, New York, Queens, Richmond, Suffolk and Westchester counties.
- The Middle District (7 seats) consisted of Dutchess, Orange, Ulster, Columbia, Delaware, Rockland, Greene, Sullivan and Putnam counties.
- The Eastern District (8 seats) consisted of Washington, Clinton, Rensselaer, Albany, Saratoga, Essex, Montgomery, Franklin, Schenectady and Warren counties.
- The Western District (12 seats) consisted of Herkimer, Ontario, Otsego, Tioga, Onondaga, Schoharie, Steuben, Chenango, Oneida, Cayuga, Genesee, Seneca, Jefferson, Lewis, St. Lawrence, Allegany, Broome, Madison, Niagara, Cortland, Cattaraugus and Chautauqua counties.
Note: There are now 62 counties in the State of New York. The counties which are not mentioned in this list had not yet been established, or sufficiently organized, the area being included in one or more of the abovementioned counties.

=== Members ===
The asterisk (*) denotes members of the previous Legislature who continued in office as members of this Legislature. William Ross changed from the Assembly to the Senate.

District	Senators	Term left	Party	Notes
Southern	Nathan Sanford*	1 year	Dem.-Rep.	until March 21, 1815, also United States Attorney for the District of New York; on February 7, 1815, elected to the U.S. Senate
Southern	Elbert H. Jones*	2 years	Federalist	resigned on March 6, 1815
Southern	Peter W. Radcliff*	2 years	Federalist	
Southern	Jonathan Dayton*	3 years	Dem.-Rep.	elected to the Council of Appointment
Southern	Darius Crosby	4 years	Dem.-Rep.	
Middle	Erastus Root*	1 year	Dem.-Rep.	
Middle	William Taber*	1 year	Dem.-Rep.	
Middle	Martin Van Buren*	2 years	Dem.-Rep.	from February 17, 1815, also New York Attorney General
Middle	Lucas Elmendorf*	3 years	Dem.-Rep.	elected to the Council of Appointment
Middle	Samuel G. Verbryck*	3 years	Dem.-Rep.	
Middle	Moses I. Cantine	4 years	Dem.-Rep.	
Middle	William Ross*	4 years	Dem.-Rep.	
Eastern	Elisha Arnold*	1 year	Dem.-Rep.	
Eastern	Kitchel Bishop*	1 year	Dem.-Rep.	
Eastern	Ruggles Hubbard*	1 year	Dem.-Rep.	elected to the Council of Appointment; from April 20, 1815, also Sheriff of New York County
Eastern	Guert Van Schoonhoven	1 year	Dem.-Rep.	elected to fill vacancy, in place of John Tayler
Eastern	Gerrit Wendell*	2 years	Federalist	
Eastern	James Cochran*	3 years	Federalist	
Eastern	Samuel Stewart*	3 years	Federalist	
Eastern	George Tibbits	4 years	Federalist	
Western	Casper M. Rouse*	1 year	Dem.-Rep.	
Western	Russell Attwater*	2 years	Dem.-Rep.	
Western	Francis A. Bloodgood*	2 years	Dem.-Rep.	
Western	Archibald S. Clarke*	2 years	Dem.-Rep.	
Western	Henry Hager*	2 years	Dem.-Rep.	
Western	Henry Bloom*	3 years	Dem.-Rep.	
Western	Perley Keyes*	3 years	Dem.-Rep.	from December 9, 1814, also Collector of Customs at Sackett's Harbor
Western	Farrand Stranahan*	3 years	Dem.-Rep.	elected to the Council of Appointment
Western	Bennett Bicknell	4 years	Dem.-Rep.	
Western	Chauncey Loomis	4 years	Dem.-Rep.	
Western	Philetus Swift*	4 years	Dem.-Rep.	
Western	John J. Prendergast	4 years	Dem.-Rep.	

=== Employees ===
- Clerk: John F. Bacon

== State Assembly ==
=== Districts ===
- Albany County (4 seats)
- Allegany and Steuben counties (1 seat)
- Broome County (1 seat)
- Cattaraugus, Chautauqua and Niagara counties (1 seat)
- Cayuga County (3 seats)
- Chenango County (3 seats)
- Clinton and Franklin counties (1 seat)
- Cortland County (1 seat)
- Columbia County (4 seats)
- Delaware County (2 seats)
- Dutchess County (5 seats)
- Essex County (1 seat)
- Genesee County (1 seat)
- Greene County (2 seats)
- Herkimer County (3 seats)
- Jefferson County (2 seats)
- Kings County (1 seat)
- Lewis County (1 seat)
- Madison County (3 seats)
- Montgomery County (5 seats)
- The City and County of New York (11 seats)
- Oneida County (5 seats)
- Onondaga County (2 seats)
- Ontario County (5 seats)
- Orange County (4 seats)
- Otsego County (4 seats)
- Putnam County (1 seat)
- Queens County (3 seats)
- Rensselaer County (4 seats)
- Richmond County (1 seat)
- Rockland County (1 seat)
- St. Lawrence County (1 seat)
- Saratoga County (4 seats)
- Schenectady County (2 seats)
- Schoharie County (2 seats)
- Seneca County (1 seat)
- Suffolk County (3 seats)
- Sullivan and Ulster counties (4 seats)
- Tioga County (1 seat)
- Warren and Washington counties (5 seats)
- Westchester County (3 seats)
Note: There are now 62 counties in the State of New York. The counties which are not mentioned in this list had not yet been established, or sufficiently organized, the area being included in one or more of the abovementioned counties.

=== Assemblymen ===
The asterisk (*) denotes members of the previous Legislature who continued as members of this Legislature.

District	Assemblymen	Party	Notes
Albany	Harmanus Bleecker*	Federalist	
Albany	Sylvester Ford		
Albany	Jesse Tyler	Federalist	
Albany	John D. Winne		or John L. Winne*?
Allegany and Steuben	Daniel Cruger*	Dem.-Rep.	
Broome	Asa Leonard		
Cattaraugus, Chautauqua and Niagara	Joseph McClure		
Cayuga	John H. Beach	Dem.-Rep.	
Cayuga	Silas Bowker*		
Cayuga	Barnabas Smith	Dem.-Rep.	
Chenango	John Guthrie		
Chenango	Thompson Mead		
Chenango	Robert Monell	Dem.-Rep.	
Clinton and Franklin	Robert Platt	Federalist	
Columbia	Henry Livingston	Federalist	
Columbia	Augustus Tremain		
Columbia	Jacob R. Van Rensselaer*	Federalist	until February 16, 1815, also Secretary of State of New York
Columbia	Elisha Williams*	Federalist	
Cortland	Samuel G. Hathaway	Dem.-Rep.	
Delaware	Robert Clark	Dem.-Rep.	
Delaware	Asahel E. Paine		
Dutchess	John Beadle	Federalist	
Dutchess	Joel Benton	Federalist	
Dutchess	William A. Duer*	Federalist	
Dutchess	James Emott*	Federalist	
Dutchess	James Grant	Federalist	
Essex	Reuben Sanford	Dem.-Rep.	
Genesee	Isaac Sutherland		
Greene	James Gale	Federalist	
Greene	Martin G. Van Bergen		
Herkimer	Jonas Cleland*	Dem.-Rep.	
Herkimer	Aaron Hackley, Jr.*	Dem.-Rep.	
Herkimer	John McCombs	Dem.-Rep.	
Jefferson	Ethel Bronson*	Federalist	
Jefferson	(Mark Hopkins)	Federalist	or vacant?
Kings	Teunis Schenck	Dem.-Rep.	
Lewis	Ela Collins	Dem.-Rep.	from March 15, 1815, also District Attorney of the 8th District
Madison	David Beecher		
Madison	Windsor Coman		
Madison	John Mattison		
Montgomery	Solomon Diefendorf		
Montgomery	John Eisenlord		
Montgomery	Alexander St. John		
Montgomery	John Shuler		
Montgomery	Alvah Southworth		
New York	Charles Baldwin		
New York	Francis Cooper	Dem.-Rep.	
New York	Jacob Drake	Dem.-Rep.	
New York	Ogden Edwards	Dem.-Rep.	
New York	Isaac Pierson	Dem.-Rep.	
New York	Peter Sharpe	Dem.-Rep.	
New York	Joseph Smith		
New York	Peter Stagg		
New York	Samuel Torbett		
New York	George Warner	Dem.-Rep.	
New York	Augustus Wright	Dem.-Rep.	
Oneida	Theodore Hill		
Oneida	John Lay		
Oneida	James Lynch*	Federalist	
Oneida	Rufus Pettibone		
Oneida	John Storrs	Federalist	
Onondaga	Hezekiah L. Granger	Dem.-Rep.	
Onondaga	James Porter	Dem.-Rep.	
Ontario	Peter Allen	Dem.-Rep.	
Ontario	John Price		
Ontario	James Roseburgh		
Ontario	Ira Selby		
Ontario	David Sutherland*		
Orange	Hezekiah Belknap		
Orange	Edward Ely		
Orange	James Finch Jr.	Dem.-Rep.	
Orange	Benjamin Woodward		
Otsego	Nathaniel Fenton	Dem.-Rep.	
Otsego	Lemuel Fitch	Dem.-Rep.	
Otsego	Arunah Metcalf	Dem.-Rep.	
Otsego	Robert Roseboom	Dem.-Rep.	
Putnam	David Knapp		
Queens	Stephen Carman*	Federalist	
Queens	Daniel Kissam*	Federalist	
Queens	Solomon Wooden		
Rensselaer	David Allen	Federalist	
Rensselaer	Henry A. Lake	Federalist	
Rensselaer	Jacob A. Ten Eyck	Federalist	
Rensselaer	Zebulon Scriven	Federalist	
Richmond	Jesse Oakley	Federalist	
Rockland	Peter S. Van Orden*	Dem.-Rep.	
St. Lawrence	David A. Ogden	Federalist	
Saratoga	Benjamin Cowles		
Saratoga	Howel Gardner		
Saratoga	Richard Ketchum		
Saratoga	Samuel Young*	Dem.-Rep.	elected Speaker
Schenectady	Ezekiel Sexton	Dem.-Rep.	
Schenectady	John Victory	Dem.-Rep.	
Schoharie	William C. Bouck*	Dem.-Rep.	
Schoharie	William Dietz*		
Seneca	David Woodcock	Dem.-Rep.	
Suffolk	John P. Osborn	Dem.-Rep.	
Suffolk	Tredwell Scudder	Dem.-Rep.	
Suffolk	John Wells	Dem.-Rep.	
Sullivan and Ulster	Wessel Broadhead		
Sullivan and Ulster	Darius Martin		
Sullivan and Ulster	David Staples		
Sullivan and Ulster	Thomas Van Gaasbeck		
Tioga	Caleb Baker*	Dem.-Rep.	
Warren and Washington	John Gale	Dem.-Rep.	
Warren and Washington	Henry Mattison	Dem.-Rep.	
Warren and Washington	Nathaniel Pitcher	Dem.-Rep.	
Warren and Washington	John Richards	Dem.-Rep.	
Warren and Washington	Isaac Sargent	Dem.-Rep.	
Westchester	Benjamin Isaacs	Federalist	
Westchester	Peter J. Munro	Federalist	
Westchester	William Requa	Federalist	

=== Employees ===
- Clerk: Aaron Clark
- Sergeant-at-Arms: Thomas Donnelly
- Doorkeeper: Benjamin Whipple

== Sources ==
- The New York Civil List compiled by Franklin Benjamin Hough (Weed, Parsons and Co., 1858) [see pg. 108f for Senate districts; pg. 122 for senators; pg. 148f for Assembly districts; pg. 189f for assemblymen]
- The History of Political Parties in the State of New-York, from the Ratification of the Federal Constitution to 1840 by Jabez D. Hammond (4th ed., Vol. 1, H. & E. Phinney, Cooperstown, 1846; pages 375-400)
- Partial election result Assembly, Clinton and Franklin Co. at project "A New Nation Votes", compiled by Phil Lampi, hosted by Tufts University Digital Library [gives only votes from Clinton Co.]
- Election result Assembly, Cortland Co. at project "A New Nation Votes"
- Election result Assembly, Dutchess Co. at project "A New Nation Votes"
- Election result Assembly, Greene Co. at project "A New Nation Votes"
- Election result Assembly, Herkimer Co. at project "A New Nation Votes"
- Election result Assembly, Kings Co. at project "A New Nation Votes"
- Election result Assembly, Lewis Co. at project "A New Nation Votes"
- Election result Assembly, Onondaga Co. at project "A New Nation Votes"
- Election result Assembly, Otsego Co. at project "A New Nation Votes"
- Election result Assembly, Rensselaer Co. at project "A New Nation Votes"
- Election result Assembly, Rockland Co. at project "A New Nation Votes"
- Election result Assembly, Schenectady Co. at project "A New Nation Votes"
- Election result Assembly, Schoharie Co. at project "A New Nation Votes"
- Election result Assembly, Suffolk Co. at project "A New Nation Votes"
- Partial election result Senate, Southern D. at project "A New Nation Votes" [gives only votes of Kings and Suffolk Co.]
- Partial election result Senate, Middle D. at project "A New Nation Votes" [gives only votes of Dutchess, Greene and Rockland Co.)
- Partial election result Senate, Eastern D. at project "A New Nation Votes" [gives only votes of Albany, Clinton, Rensselaer and Schenectady Co.]
- Partial election result Senate, Western D. at project "A New Nation Votes" [gives only votes of Cortland, Herkimer, Jefferson, Onondaga, Otsego and Schoharie Co.]
- Election result, Speaker at project "A New Nation Votes"
- Election result, Assembly Clerk at project "A New Nation Votes"
- Election result, Council of Appointment at project "A New Nation Votes"
