= 40th New York State Legislature =

New York state legislative session

←	39th	41st	→
- The Old State Capitol (1879)

Overview
- Legislative body: New York State Legislature
- Jurisdiction: New York, United States
- Term: July 1, 1816 – June 30, 1817

Senate
- Members: 32
- President: Lieutenant Governor John Tayler (Dem.-Rep.), until February 24, 1817
- Temporary President: Philetus Swift (Democrat-Republican), from February 24, 1817
- Party control: Democratic-Republican (25-7)

Assembly
- Members: 126
- Speaker: David Woods (Democrat-Republican)
- Party control: Democratic-Republican (84-33)

Sessions
- 1st: November 5 – 12, 1816
- 2nd: January 14 – April 15, 1817

The 40th New York State Legislature, consisting of the New York State Senate and the New York State Assembly, met from November 5, 1816, to April 15, 1817, during the tenth year of Daniel D. Tompkins's governorship, and while John Tayler was Acting Governor, in Albany.

== Background ==
Under the provisions of the New York Constitution of 1777, amended by the Constitutional Convention of 1801, 32 Senators were elected on general tickets in the four senatorial districts for four-year terms. They were divided into four classes, and every year eight Senate seats came up for election. Assemblymen were elected countywide on general tickets to a one-year term, the whole Assembly being renewed annually.

In 1797, Albany was declared the state capital, and all subsequent legislatures have been meeting there ever since. In 1799, the legislature enacted that future legislatures meet on the last Tuesday of January of each year unless called earlier by the governor.

On April 17, 1815, the legislature had re-apportioned the Senate districts, to take effect in May 1815: Dutchess, Putnam and Rockland Co. (and 1 seat) were transferred from the Middle to the Southern District; Albany Co. from the Eastern, and Chenango, Otsego and Schoharie Co. from the Western (and 3 seats) were transferred to the Middle District; Herkimer, Jefferson, Lewis and St. Lawrence Co. (and 3 seats) were transferred from the Western to the Eastern District. However, the state senators already in office, and the senators elected in April 1815 under the previous apportionment, should represent the district in which they resided. When taking their seats at the next session in January 1816, in three districts there was a number of senators differing from the apportionment, which was corrected at the election in 1816.

On February 20, 1816, a caucus of Democratic-Republican legislators nominated Gov. Daniel D. Tompkins and Lt. Gov. John Tayler for re-election. The Federalists nominated U.S. Senator Rufus King for governor; and State Senator George Tibbits for lieutenant governor.

At this time the politicians were divided into two opposing political parties: the Federalists and the Democratic-Republicans.

== Elections ==
The State election was held from April 30 to May 2, 1816. Gov. Daniel D. Tompkins and Lt. Gov. John Tayler were re-elected.

Senator Martin Van Buren (Middle D.) was re-elected. Walter Bowne, John D. Ditmis (both Southern D.), John Noyes, Peter Swart (both Middle D.), Ephraim Hart, John Knox and William Mallery (all three Western D.) were also elected to the Senate. All eight were Democratic-Republicans.

== Sessions ==
The legislature met at the Old State Capitol in Albany on November 5, 1816, to elect presidential electors; and adjourned on November 12.

David Woods (Dem.-Rep.) was elected Speaker with 84 votes against 33 for James Emott (Fed.).

On November 8, the Legislature chose 29 electors, all Democratic-Republicans: Henry Rutgers, Lemuel Chipman, John W. Seaman, Jacob Drake, James Fairlie, Theodorus W. Van Wyck, Joseph D. Monell, John Blake Jr., Jacob Wertz, Gabriel North, Charles E. Dudley, Benjamin Smith, Samuel Lewis, Alexander McNish, Artemus Aldrich, Augustus Wright, Peter S. Van Orden, Henry Becker, Aaron Haring, Israel W. Clark, Daniel Root, Montgomery Hunt, Nicoll Fosdick, Eliphalet Edmonds, George Pettit, Richard Townley, Samuel Lawrence, Nathaniel Rochester and Worthy L. Churchill. They cast their votes for James Monroe and Daniel D. Tompkins.

The legislature met for the regular session on January 14, 1817; and adjourned on April 15.

On January 28, Gov. Tompkins sent a message to the legislature, "recommending the entire abolition of slavery in the state of New-York, to take place on the 4th of July, 1827," which was passed into law during this session.

On February 12, the legislature elected Gerrit L. Dox (Dem.-Rep.) to succeed Charles Z. Platt (Fed.) as New York State Treasurer.

On February 24, Gov. Tompkins resigned, to take office as U.S. Vice President on March 4. Lt. Gov. John Tayler became acting governor for the remainder of the legislative year, until June 30; and Philetus Swift (Dem.-Rep.) was elected president pro tempore of the state Senate.

On March 25, the first ever state convention met to nominate a candidate for Governor of New York. The Democratic-Republican party members from counties which were represented in the Assembly by Federalists had complained that these counties were not taking any part in the nomination under the previous system, under which candidates were nominated by legislative caucus. This time, a Democratic-Republican convention composed of the state legislators, and delegates elected in the Federalist counties, nominated Canal Commissioner DeWitt Clinton for governor, and Acting Gov. John Tayler for lieutenant governor. Clinton received 85 votes against 41 for Peter B. Porter.

== State Senate ==
=== Districts ===
- The Southern District (6 seats) consisted of Dutchess, Kings, New York, Putnam, Queens, Richmond, Rockland, Suffolk and Westchester counties.
- The Middle District (9 seats) consisted of Albany, Chenango, Columbia, Delaware, Greene, Orange, Otsego, Schoharie, Sullivan and Ulster counties.
- The Eastern District (8 seats) consisted of Clinton, Essex, Franklin, Herkimer, Jefferson, Lewis, Montgomery, Rensselaer, St. Lawrence, Saratoga, Schenectady, Warren and Washington counties.
- The Western District (9 seats) consisted of Allegany, Broome, Cattaraugus, Cayuga, Chautauqua, Cortland, Genesee, Madison, Niagara, Oneida, Onondaga, Ontario, Seneca, Steuben and Tioga counties.
Note: There are now 62 counties in the State of New York. The counties which are not mentioned in this list had not yet been established, or sufficiently organized, the area being included in one or more of the abovementioned counties.

=== Members ===
The asterisk (*) denotes members of the previous Legislature who continued in office as members of this Legislature.

District	Senators	Term left	Party	Notes
Southern	Jonathan Dayton*	1 year	Dem.-Rep.	
Southern	Samuel G. Verbryck*	1 year	Dem.-Rep.	
Southern	Darius Crosby*	2 years	Dem.-Rep.	
Southern	Peter R. Livingston*	3 years	Dem.-Rep.	
Southern	Walter Bowne	4 years	Dem.-Rep.	elected to the Council of Appointment
Southern	John D. Ditmis	4 years	Dem.-Rep.	
Middle	Lucas Elmendorf*	1 year	Dem.-Rep.	
Middle	Farrand Stranahan*	1 year	Dem.-Rep.	
Middle	Moses I. Cantine*	2 years	Dem.-Rep.	
Middle	William Ross*	2 years	Dem.-Rep.	
Middle	Isaac Ogden*	3 years	Dem.-Rep.	
Middle	Abraham Van Vechten*	3 years	Federalist	
Middle	John Noyes	4 years	Dem.-Rep.	elected to the Council of Appointment
Middle	Peter Swart	4 years	Dem.-Rep.	
Middle	Martin Van Buren*	4 years	Dem.-Rep.	also New York Attorney General
Eastern	James Cochran*	1 year	Federalist	
Eastern	Perley Keyes*	1 year	Dem.-Rep.	
Eastern	Samuel Stewart*	1 year	Federalist	
Eastern	John J. Prendergast*	2 years	Dem.-Rep.	elected to the Council of Appointment
Eastern	George Tibbits*	2 years	Federalist	
Eastern	David Allen*	3 years	Federalist	
Eastern	Henry J. Frey*	3 years	Federalist	
Eastern	Ralph Hascall*	3 years	Federalist	
Western	Henry Bloom*	1 year	Dem.-Rep.	elected to the Council of Appointment
Western	Bennett Bicknell*	2 years	Dem.-Rep.	
Western	Chauncey Loomis*	2 years	Dem.-Rep.	died April 6, 1817
Western	Philetus Swift*	2 years	Dem.-Rep.	on February 24, 1817, elected Temporary President
Western	Stephen Bates*	3 years	Dem.-Rep.	
Western	Henry Seymour*	3 years	Dem.-Rep.	
Western	Ephraim Hart	4 years	Dem.-Rep.	
Western	John Knox	4 years	Dem.-Rep.	
Western	William Mallery	4 years	Dem.-Rep.	

=== Employees ===
- Clerk: John F. Bacon

== State Assembly ==
=== Districts ===
- Albany County (4 seats)
- Allegany and Steuben counties (2 seats)
- Broome County (1 seat)
- Cattaraugus, Chautauqua and Niagara counties (2 seats)
- Cayuga County (4 seats)
- Chenango County (3 seats)
- Clinton and Franklin counties (1 seat)
- Columbia County (4 seats)
- Cortland County (1 seat)
- Delaware County (2 seats)
- Dutchess County (5 seats)
- Essex County (1 seat)
- Genesee County (3 seats)
- Greene County (2 seats)
- Herkimer County (3 seats)
- Jefferson County (2 seats)
- Kings County (1 seat)
- Lewis County (1 seat)
- Madison County (3 seats)
- Montgomery County (5 seats)
- The City and County of New York (11 seats)
- Oneida County (5 seats)
- Onondaga County (4 seats)
- Ontario County (7 seats)
- Orange County (4 seats)
- Otsego County (5 seats)
- Putnam County (1 seat)
- Queens County (3 seats)
- Rensselaer County (5 seats)
- Richmond County (1 seat)
- Rockland County (1 seat)
- St. Lawrence County (1 seat)
- Saratoga County (4 seats)
- Schenectady County (2 seats)
- Schoharie County (3 seats)
- Seneca County (3 seats)
- Suffolk County (3 seats)
- Sullivan and Ulster counties (4 seats)
- Tioga County (1 seat)
- Warren and Washington counties (5 seats)
- Westchester County (3 seats)
Note: There are now 62 counties in the State of New York. The counties which are not mentioned in this list had not yet been established, or sufficiently organized, the area being included in one or more of the abovementioned counties.

=== Assemblymen ===
The asterisk (*) denotes members of the previous Legislature who continued as members of this Legislature.

District	Assemblymen	Party	Notes
Albany	John H. Burhans		
Albany	John J. Ostrander*	Federalist	
Albany	Gideon Tabor		
Albany	Rufus Watson		
Allegany and Steuben	Timothy H. Porter*		
Allegany and Steuben	William B. Rochester	Dem.-Rep.	
Broome	Joshua Whitney	Federalist	
Cattaraugus, Chautauqua and Niagara	Jediah Prendergast	Dem.-Rep.	
Cattaraugus, Chautauqua and Niagara	Richard Smith		
Cayuga	John H. Beach*	Dem.-Rep.	
Cayuga	John Brown Jr.*	Dem.-Rep.	
Cayuga	Rowland Day	Dem.-Rep.	
Cayuga	John McFadden*	Dem.-Rep.	
Chenango	James Houghteling		
Chenango	Samuel A. Smith	Dem.-Rep.	
Chenango	Ebenezer Wakley	Dem.-Rep.	
Clinton and Franklin	Benjamin Mooers*	Dem.-Rep.	
Columbia	Gerrit Cuck		
Columbia	Hezekiah Hulburt		
Columbia	John Pixley		
Columbia	Elisha Williams	Federalist	
Cortland	John Miller	Dem.-Rep.	
Delaware	Martin Keeler		
Delaware	Asahel E. Paine		
Dutchess	Joel Benton	Federalist	
Dutchess	William A. Duer*	Federalist	
Dutchess	James Emott	Federalist	
Dutchess	Nathaniel Pendleton	Federalist	
Dutchess	Abiel Sherman	Federalist	
Essex	Reuben Sanford*	Dem.-Rep.	
Genesee	James Ganson*	Dem.-Rep.	the only member who voted against seating Fellows
Genesee	Elizur Webster*	Dem.-Rep.	
Genesee	Isaac Wilson	Dem.-Rep.	
Greene	Levi Callender	Federalist	
Greene	Justus Squire	Federalist	
Herkimer	Abijah Beckwith	Dem.-Rep.	
Herkimer	William D. Ford*	Dem.-Rep.	
Herkimer	George Rosecrantz	Dem.-Rep.	
Jefferson	Abel Cole*		
Jefferson	Ebenezer Wood	Dem.-Rep.	
Kings	(Richard Fish)*	Dem.-Rep.	Civil List says "no returns"
Lewis	Chillus Doty*		
Madison	James B. Eldridge		
Madison	Moses Maynard		
Madison	Jonathan Olmsted	Dem.-Rep.	
Montgomery	Benedict Arnold	Dem.-Rep.	
Montgomery	Henry Fonda	Dem.-Rep.	
Montgomery	Henry Gros	Dem.-Rep.	
Montgomery	Samuel Jackson	Dem.-Rep.	
Montgomery	Isaac Sears	Dem.-Rep.	
New York	Clarkson Crolius	Dem.-Rep.	
New York	Henry Eckford	Dem.-Rep.	
New York	Cornelius Heeney	Dem.-Rep.	
New York	John T. Irving	Dem.-Rep.	
New York	John L. Lawrence		
New York	Asa Mann		
New York	Samuel B. Romaine	Dem.-Rep.	
New York	Samuel Russell	Dem.-Rep.	
New York	Peter Sharpe	Dem.-Rep.	
New York	Joseph Smith*		
New York	George Warner*	Dem.-Rep.	
Oneida	David I. Ambler		
Oneida	Wheeler Barnes		
Oneida	Henry Huntington	Dem.-Rep.	contested by Abram Camp who took the seat on January 14, 1817
Oneida	Martin Hawley		
Oneida	Newton Marsh		
Onondaga	Elijah Miles*	Dem.-Rep.	
Onondaga	James Webb	Dem.-Rep.	
Onondaga	Asa Wells	Dem.-Rep.	
Onondaga	Gideon Wilcoxson	Dem.-Rep.	
Ontario	Peter Allen	Dem.-Rep.	
Ontario	Jonathan Child*		
Ontario	Byram Green		
Ontario	Caleb Hopkins		
Ontario	Joshua Lee		
Ontario	James Roseburgh		
Ontario	Nathan Whiting		
Orange	James Faulkner		
Orange	James Finch Jr.	Dem.-Rep.	
Orange	John Hallock Jr.		
Orange	Elihu Hedges		
Otsego	Henry Albert		
Otsego	William Campbell*	Federalist	
Otsego	Cyrenus Noble		
Otsego	Henry Palmer		
Otsego	Elijah Turner		
Putnam	Edward Smith Jr.		
Queens	Stephen Carman*	Federalist	
Queens	William Jones*	Federalist	
Queens	Daniel Kissam*	Federalist	
Rensselaer	David Carpenter	Federalist	
Rensselaer	John D. Dickinson	Federalist	
Rensselaer	Burton Hammond	Federalist	
Rensselaer	Henry Platt	Federalist	
Rensselaer	Ebenezer W. Walbridge	Federalist	
Richmond	Richard C. Corson		
Rockland	Cornelius A. Blauvelt*		
St. Lawrence	William W. Bowen*	Federalist	
Saratoga	Herman Gansevoort		
Saratoga	John Hamilton		
Saratoga	Zebulon Mott		
Saratoga	John Pettit		
Schenectady	Harmanus Peek	Dem.-Rep.	
Schenectady	John Victory	Dem.-Rep.	
Schoharie	Isaac Barber		
Schoharie	Peter A. Hilton*		
Schoharie	Aaron Hubbard		
Seneca	Archer Green		
Seneca	Jacob L. Larzelere*		
Seneca	William Thompson*	Dem.-Rep.	
Suffolk	Israel Carll	Dem.-Rep.	
Suffolk	Thomas S. Lester	Dem.-Rep.	
Suffolk	Abraham Parsons		
Sullivan and Ulster	Peter A. Cantine	Dem.-Rep.	
Sullivan and Ulster	John Conklin	Dem.-Rep.	
Sullivan and Ulster	Green Miller*	Dem.-Rep.	
Sullivan and Ulster	Christopher Tappen Jr.	Dem.-Rep.	
Tioga	Gamaliel H. Barstow*	Dem.-Rep.	
Warren and Washington	William Cook		
Warren and Washington	John Gale	Dem.-Rep.	
Warren and Washington	Nathaniel Pitcher	Dem.-Rep.	
Warren and Washington	Isaac Sargent	Dem.-Rep.	
Warren and Washington	David Woods	Dem.-Rep.	elected Speaker
Westchester	Abraham Miller*	Dem.-Rep.	
Westchester	John Townsend	Dem.-Rep.	
Westchester	Ebenezer White Jr.	Dem.-Rep.	

=== Employees ===
- Clerk: Aaron Clark
- Sergeant-at-Arms: Thomas Donnelly
- Doorkeeper: Benjamin Whipple

== Sources ==
- The New York Civil List compiled by Franklin Benjamin Hough (Weed, Parsons and Co., 1858) [see pg. 108f for Senate districts; pg. 123 for senators; pg. 148f for Assembly districts; pg. 191f for assemblymen; pg. 321 and 325 for presidential election]
- The History of Political Parties in the State of New-York, from the Ratification of the Federal Constitution to 1840 by Jabez D. Hammond (4th ed., Vol. 1, H. & E. Phinney, Cooperstown, 1846; pages 425–442)
- Election result Assembly, Broome Co. at project "A New Nation Votes", compiled by Phil Lampi, hosted by Tufts University Digital Library
- Election result Assembly, Clinton and Franklin Co. at project "A New Nation Votes"
- Election result Assembly, Cortland Co. at project "A New Nation Votes"
- Partial election result Assembly, Dutchess Co. at project "A New Nation Votes" [gives no candidates' names]
- Election result Assembly, Essex Co. at project "A New Nation Votes"
- Partial election result Assembly, Greene Co. at project "A New Nation Votes" [gives no candidates' names]
- Election result Assembly, Kings Co. at project "A New Nation Votes"
- Election result Assembly, Montgomery Co. at project "A New Nation Votes"
- Election result Assembly, Onondaga Co. at project "A New Nation Votes"
- Election result Assembly, Rensselaer Co. at project "A New Nation Votes"
- Election result Assembly, St. Lawrence Co. at project "A New Nation Votes"
- Election result Assembly, Schenectady Co. at project "A New Nation Votes"
- Election result Assembly, Sullivan and Ulster Co. at project "A New Nation Votes"
- Election result Assembly, Westchester Co. at project "A New Nation Votes"
- Partial election result Senate, Southern D. at project "A New Nation Votes" [gives only votes of Kings and Westchester Co.]
- Partial election result Senate, Middle D. at project "A New Nation Votes" [gives only votes from Sullivan and Ulster Co.]
- Partial election result Senate, Western D. at project "A New Nation Votes" [gives only votes of Broome, Cortland and Onondaga Co.]
- Election result, Speaker at project "A New Nation Votes" [gives wrong party affiliations]
