= 41st New York State Legislature =

New York state legislative session

| ← | 40th | 42nd | → |
- The Old State Capitol (1879)

Overview
- Legislative body: New York State Legislature
- Jurisdiction: New York, United States
- Term: July 1, 1817 – June 30, 1818

Senate
- Members: 32
- President: Lt. Gov. John Tayler (Dem.-Rep.)
- Party control: Democratic-Republican (27-5)

Assembly
- Members: 126
- Speaker: David Woods (Dem.-Rep.)
- Party control: Democratic-Republican

Sessions
- 1st: January 27 – April 21, 1818

The 41st New York State Legislature, consisting of the New York State Senate and the New York State Assembly, met from January 27 to April 21, 1818, during the first year of DeWitt Clinton's governorship, in Albany.

== Background ==
Under the provisions of the New York Constitution of 1777, amended by the Constitutional Convention of 1801, 32 Senators were elected on general tickets in the four senatorial districts for four-year terms. They were divided into four classes, and every year eight Senate seats came up for election. Assemblymen were elected countywide on general tickets to a one-year term, the whole Assembly being renewed annually.

In 1797, Albany was declared the State capital, and all subsequent Legislatures have been meeting there ever since. In 1799, the Legislature enacted that future Legislatures meet on the last Tuesday of January of each year unless called earlier by the governor.

On February 24, 1817, Gov. Tompkins resigned, to take office as U.S. Vice President on March 4; and Lt. Gov. John Tayler became Acting Governor for the remainder of the legislative year, until June 30. On March 25, the Democratic-Republican State Convention nominated Canal Commissioner DeWitt Clinton for Governor, and Acting Gov. John Tayler for Lieutenant Governor. Clinton received 85 votes against 41 for Peter B. Porter (Buckt.). The Federalist Party did not nominate candidates for governor and lieutenant governor.

On April 6, 1817, State Senator Chauncey Loomis died, leaving a vacancy in the Western District.

On April 7, 1817, Tompkins County was created from parts of Cayuga and Seneca counties, and was apportioned two seats in the Assembly, one each taken from Cayuga and Seneca.

At this time the politicians were divided into two opposing political parties: the Federalists and the Democratic-Republicans. The Democratic-Republican Party was split into two factions: the Clintonians (supporters of Gov. DeWitt Clinton and his Erie Canal project) and the Bucktails (led by Att. Gen. Martin Van Buren, and including the Tammany Hall organization in New York City).

== Elections ==
The State election was held from April 29 to May 1, 1817. DeWitt Clinton and John Tayler were elected unopposed.

Senator Jonathan Dayton (Southern D.) was re-elected. Stephen Barnum (Southern D.), Jabez D. Hammond, John Lounsbery (both Middle D.), Roger Skinner, Henry Yates Jr., Samuel Young (all three Eastern D.) and Assemblyman Isaac Wilson (Western D.) were also elected to full terms in the Senate. Assemblyman Jediah Prendergast (Western D.) was elected to fill the vacancy. All nine were Democratic-Republicans.

== Sessions ==
The Legislature met at the Old State Capitol in Albany on January 27, 1818, and adjourned on April 21.

David Woods (Dem.-Rep.) was re-elected Speaker with 97 votes.

Assemblyman Ogden Edwards (Buckt.) proposed a bill to call a State convention to amend the Constitution concerning the appointment of public officers, his object being the abolition of the Council of Appointment. The bill, opposed by Gov. DeWitt Clinton, was eventually rejected, but the issue was pursued further by the Bucktails, and led to the New York State Constitutional Convention of 1821, and a new Constitution.

On April 21, 1818, the Legislature enacted that future Legislatures meet on the first Tuesday of January of each year, unless called earlier by the governor.

== State Senate ==
=== Districts ===
- The Southern District (6 seats) consisted of Dutchess, Kings, New York, Putnam, Queens, Richmond, Rockland, Suffolk and Westchester counties.
- The Middle District (9 seats) consisted of Albany, Chenango, Columbia, Delaware, Greene, Orange, Otsego, Schoharie, Sullivan and Ulster counties.
- The Eastern District (8 seats) consisted of Clinton, Essex, Franklin, Herkimer, Jefferson, Lewis, Montgomery, Rensselaer, St. Lawrence, Saratoga, Schenectady, Warren and Washington counties.
- The Western District (9 seats) consisted of Allegany, Broome, Cattaraugus, Cayuga, Chautauqua, Cortland, Genesee, Madison, Niagara, Oneida, Onondaga, Ontario, Seneca, Steuben, Tioga and Tompkins counties.
Note: There are now 62 counties in the State of New York. The counties which are not mentioned in this list had not yet been established, or sufficiently organized, the area being included in one or more of the abovementioned counties.

=== Members ===
The asterisk (*) denotes members of the previous Legislature who continued in office as members of this Legislature. Jediah Prendergast and Isaac Wilson changed from the Assembly to the Senate.

| District | Senators | Term left | Party | Notes |
|---|---|---|---|---|
| Southern | Darius Crosby* | 1 year | Dem.-Rep./Bucktail | |
| Southern | Peter R. Livingston* | 2 years | Dem.-Rep./Bucktail | elected to the Council of Appointment |
| Southern | Walter Bowne* | 3 years | Dem.-Rep./Bucktail | |
| Southern | John D. Ditmis* | 3 years | Dem.-Rep./Bucktail | |
| Southern | Stephen Barnum | 4 years | Dem.-Rep./Bucktail | |
| Southern | Jonathan Dayton* | 4 years | Dem.-Rep./Bucktail | |
| Middle | Moses I. Cantine* | 1 year | Dem.-Rep./Bucktail | |
| Middle | William Ross* | 1 year | Dem.-Rep./Clintonian | |
| Middle | Isaac Ogden* | 2 years | Dem.-Rep./Bucktail | |
| Middle | Abraham Van Vechten* | 2 years | Federalist | |
| Middle | John Noyes* | 3 years | Dem.-Rep./Clintonian | |
| Middle | Peter Swart* | 3 years | Dem.-Rep./Clintonian | |
| Middle | Martin Van Buren* | 3 years | Dem.-Rep./Bucktail | also New York Attorney General |
| Middle | Jabez D. Hammond | 4 years | Dem.-Rep./Clintonian | elected to the Council of Appointment |
| Middle | John Lounsbery | 4 years | Dem.-Rep./Clintonian | |
| Eastern | John J. Prendergast* | 1 year | Dem.-Rep./Clintonian | |
| Eastern | George Tibbits* | 1 year | Federalist | |
| Eastern | David Allen* | 2 years | Federalist | |
| Eastern | Henry J. Frey* | 2 years | Federalist | |
| Eastern | Ralph Hascall* | 2 years | Federalist | from June 11, 1818, also D.A. of Essex Co. |
| Eastern | Roger Skinner | 4 years | Dem.-Rep./Bucktail | also U.S. Attorney for the Northern District of New York |
| Eastern | Henry Yates Jr. | 4 years | Dem.-Rep. | elected to the Council of Appointment |
| Eastern | Samuel Young | 4 years | Dem.-Rep./Bucktail | also an Erie Canal Commissioner |
| Western | Bennett Bicknell* | 1 year | Dem.-Rep. | |
| Western | Jediah Prendergast* | 1 year | Dem.-Rep. | elected to fill vacancy, in place of Chauncey Loomis; originally a Clintonian, joined the Bucktails after he lost the vote for the full term |
| Western | Philetus Swift* | 1 year | Dem.-Rep. | |
| Western | Stephen Bates* | 2 years | Dem.-Rep./Clintonian | |
| Western | Henry Seymour* | 2 years | Dem.-Rep./Bucktail | elected to the Council of Appointment |
| Western | Ephraim Hart* | 3 years | Dem.-Rep./Clintonian | |
| Western | John Knox* | 3 years | Dem.-Rep./Bucktail | |
| Western | William Mallery* | 3 years | Dem.-Rep. | |
| Western | Isaac Wilson* | 4 years | Dem.-Rep./Bucktail | |

=== Employees ===
- Clerk: John F. Bacon

== State Assembly ==
=== Districts ===
- Albany County (4 seats)
- Allegany and Steuben counties (2 seats)
- Broome County (1 seat)
- Cattaraugus, Chautauqua and Niagara counties (2 seats)
- Cayuga County (3 seats)
- Chenango County (3 seats)
- Clinton and Franklin counties (1 seat)
- Columbia County (4 seats)
- Cortland County (1 seat)
- Delaware County (2 seats)
- Dutchess County (5 seats)
- Essex County (1 seat)
- Genesee County (3 seats)
- Greene County (2 seats)
- Herkimer County (3 seats)
- Jefferson County (2 seats)
- Kings County (1 seat)
- Lewis County (1 seat)
- Madison County (3 seats)
- Montgomery County (5 seats)
- The City and County of New York (11 seats)
- Oneida County (5 seats)
- Onondaga County (4 seats)
- Ontario County (7 seats)
- Orange County (4 seats)
- Otsego County (5 seats)
- Putnam County (1 seat)
- Queens County (3 seats)
- Rensselaer County (5 seats)
- Richmond County (1 seat)
- Rockland County (1 seat)
- St. Lawrence County (1 seat)
- Saratoga County (4 seats)
- Schenectady County (2 seats)
- Schoharie County (3 seats)
- Seneca County (2 seats)
- Suffolk County (3 seats)
- Sullivan and Ulster counties (4 seats)
- Tioga County (1 seat)
- Tompkins County (2 seats)
- Warren and Washington counties (5 seats)
- Westchester County (3 seats)
Note: There are now 62 counties in the State of New York. The counties which are not mentioned in this list had not yet been established, or sufficiently organized, the area being included in one or more of the abovementioned counties.

=== Assemblymen ===
The asterisk (*) denotes members of the previous Legislature who continued as members of this Legislature.

| District | Assemblymen | Party | Notes |
|---|---|---|---|
| Albany | William A. Duer* | Federalist | previously a member from Dutchess Co. |
| Albany | James Sackett | | |
| Albany | Gideon Tabor* | | |
| Albany | Stephen Van Rensselaer | Federalist | also an Erie Canal Commissioner |
| Allegany and Steuben | James McCall | Dem.-Rep. | previously a member from Seneca Co. |
| Allegany and Steuben | William B. Rochester* | Dem.-Rep. | |
| Broome | William W. Harper | | |
| Cattaraugus, Chautauqua and Niagara | Robert Fleming | | |
| Cattaraugus, Chautauqua and Niagara | Isaac Phelps | | |
| Cayuga | William Clark 2nd | | |
| Cayuga | Thatcher I. Ferris | | |
| Cayuga | Isaac Smith | | |
| Chenango | Tilly Lynde | Dem.-Rep. | |
| Chenango | Perez Randall | | |
| Chenango | Simon G. Throop | Dem.-Rep. | from June 11, 1818, also D.A. of Chenango Co. |
| Clinton and Franklin | Gates Hoit | Federalist | |
| Columbia | Thomas Bay | | |
| Columbia | Benjamin Hilton | | |
| Columbia | Walter Patterson | Federalist | |
| Columbia | Peter Van Vleck | | |
| Cortland | Samuel G. Hathaway | | |
| Delaware | William Beach | | |
| Delaware | Erastus Root | Dem.-Rep./Bucktail | |
| Dutchess | Benjamin Haxton | Federalist | |
| Dutchess | Thomas J. Oakley | Federalist | |
| Dutchess | Andrew Pray | Federalist | |
| Dutchess | Jehiel Sackett | Federalist | |
| Dutchess | John W. Wheeler | Federalist | |
| Essex | John Hoffnagle | Dem.-Rep. | |
| Genesee | Gilbert Howell | Dem.-Rep. | |
| Genesee | Abraham Matteson | | |
| Genesee | Isaac Sutherland | | |
| Greene | John L. Bronk | | |
| Greene | Jarvis Strong | | |
| Herkimer | Nicoll Fosdick | Dem.-Rep. | |
| Herkimer | Aaron Hackley, Jr. | Dem.-Rep. | in April 1818, elected to the 16th United States Congress |
| Herkimer | George Rosecrantz* | Dem.-Rep. | |
| Jefferson | Abel Cole* | | |
| Jefferson | Horatio Orvis | Dem.-Rep. | |
| Kings | Cornelius Van Cleef | | |
| Lewis | Levi Hart | | |
| Madison | Thomas Greenly | | |
| Madison | James Nye | | |
| Madison | David Woods* | Dem.-Rep. | previously a member from Washington Co.; re-elected Speaker |
| Montgomery | Ezekiel Belding | Dem.-Rep. | |
| Montgomery | Samuel Jackson* | Dem.-Rep. | |
| Montgomery | Henry Lyker | Dem.-Rep. | |
| Montgomery | Jacob Shew | Dem.-Rep. | |
| Montgomery | Barent H. Vrooman | Dem.-Rep. | |
| New York | Cadwallader D. Colden | Dem.-Rep./Bucktail | from February 18, 1818, also Mayor of New York City |
| New York | Clarkson Crolius* | Dem.-Rep./Bucktail | |
| New York | Ogden Edwards | Dem.-Rep./Bucktail | |
| New York | Cornelius Heeney* | Dem.-Rep./Bucktail | |
| New York | Robert R. Hunter | Dem.-Rep./Bucktail | |
| New York | Henry Meigs | Dem.-Rep./Bucktail | in April 1818, elected to the 16th United States Congress |
| New York | John Morss | Dem.-Rep./Bucktail | |
| New York | Isaac Pierson | Dem.-Rep./Bucktail | |
| New York | Peter Sharpe* | Dem.-Rep./Bucktail | |
| New York | Samuel Tooker | Dem.-Rep./Bucktail | |
| New York | Michael Ulshoeffer | Dem.-Rep./Bucktail | |
| Oneida | George Brayton | Dem.-Rep. | |
| Oneida | Henry Huntington | Dem.-Rep./Clintonian | |
| Oneida | Joseph Kirkland | Federalist | |
| Oneida | Nathan Williams | Dem.-Rep. | from June 11, 1818, also D.A. of Oneida Co. |
| Oneida | Theor Woodruffe | | |
| Onondaga | Abijah Earll | Dem.-Rep./Bucktail | |
| Onondaga | David Munro | Dem.-Rep./Bucktail | |
| Onondaga | James Webb* | Dem.-Rep./Bucktail | |
| Onondaga | Asa Wells* | Dem.-Rep./Bucktail | |
| Ontario | Phinehas P. Bates | | |
| Ontario | Nathaniel Case | | |
| Ontario | Samuel Lawrence | | |
| Ontario | James Roseburgh* | | |
| Ontario | Ira Selby | | |
| Ontario | John Van Vossen | | |
| Ontario | Ezra Waite | | |
| Orange | Isaac Belknap | | |
| Orange | Anthony Davis | Dem.-Rep. | |
| Orange | John McGarrah | | |
| Orange | William Mulliner | | |
| Otsego | Joshua Babcock | | |
| Otsego | Stukely Ellsworth | | |
| Otsego | Nathaniel Fenton | Dem.-Rep. | |
| Otsego | John Moore | | |
| Otsego | David Tripp | | |
| Putnam | William H. Johnstone | | |
| Queens | Stephen Carman* | Federalist | |
| Queens | William Jones* | Federalist | |
| Queens | Daniel Kissam* | Federalist | |
| Rensselaer | Abijah Bush | Federalist | |
| Rensselaer | Andrew Finch | Federalist | contested by Cornelius I. Schermerhorn (Fed.) who was seated on February 2, 1818 |
| Rensselaer | Myndert Groesbeck | Federalist | |
| Rensselaer | Munson Smith | Dem.-Rep. | |
| Rensselaer | Thomas Turner | Dem.-Rep. | |
| Richmond | Richard C. Corson* | | |
| Rockland | Abraham Gurnee | Dem.-Rep. | |
| St. Lawrence | David C. Judson | | |
| Saratoga | John Gibson | | |
| Saratoga | Staats Morris | | |
| Saratoga | Elisha Powell | | |
| Saratoga | Earl Stimson | | |
| Schenectady | Daniel L. Van Antwerp | Dem.-Rep. | from June 11, 1818, also D.A. of Albany Co. |
| Schenectady | Simon A. Veeder | | |
| Schoharie | William C. Bouck | Dem.-Rep. | |
| Schoharie | George H. Mann | | |
| Schoharie | Nathan P. Tyler | | |
| Seneca | vacant | | |
| Seneca | William Thompson* | Dem.-Rep. | |
| Suffolk | Charles H. Havens | | |
| Suffolk | Nathaniel Miller | | |
| Suffolk | John P. Osborn | Dem.-Rep. | |
| Sullivan and Ulster | William Doll | | |
| Sullivan and Ulster | Levi Jansen | | |
| Sullivan and Ulster | Samuel Smith | | |
| Sullivan and Ulster | David Staples | | |
| Tioga | Gamaliel H. Barstow* | Dem.-Rep. | from June 22, 1818, also First Judge of the Tioga Co. Court |
| Tompkins | Samuel Crittenden | | |
| Tompkins | John Sutton | | |
| Warren and Washington | Duncan Cameron | | |
| Warren and Washington | Jason Kellogg | Dem.-Rep. | |
| Warren and Washington | Alexander Livingston | Dem.-Rep. | |
| Warren and Washington | John McLean Jr. | | |
| Warren and Washington | Isaac Sargent* | Dem.-Rep. | |
| Westchester | William Barker | Federalist | |
| Westchester | Benjamin Isaacs | Federalist | |
| Westchester | William Requa | Federalist | |

=== Employees ===
- Clerk: Aaron Clark
- Sergeant-at-Arms: Caleb Benjamin
- Doorkeeper: Benjamin Whipple

== Sources ==
- The New York Civil List compiled by Franklin Benjamin Hough (Weed, Parsons and Co., 1858) [see pg. 108f for Senate districts; pg. 123 for senators; pg. 148f for Assembly districts; pg. 193f for assemblymen]
- The History of Political Parties in the State of New-York, from the Ratification of the Federal Constitution to 1840 by Jabez D. Hammond (4th ed., Vol. 1, H. & E. Phinney, Cooperstown, 1846; pages 443–469)
- Election result Assembly, Albany Co. at project "A New Nation Votes", compiled by Phil Lampi, hosted by Tufts University Digital Library
- Election result Assembly, Cattaraugus, Chautauqua and Niagara Co. at project "A New Nation Votes"
- Partial election result Assembly, Clinton and Franklin Co. at project "A New Nation Votes" [gives only partial vote of Clinton Co.]
- Election result Assembly, Dutchess Co. at project "A New Nation Votes"
- Election result Assembly, Genesee Co. at project "A New Nation Votes"
- Partial election result Assembly, Greene Co. at project "A New Nation Votes" [gives no candidates' names]
- Election result Assembly, Jefferson Co. at project "A New Nation Votes"
- Election result Assembly, Montgomery Co. at project "A New Nation Votes"
- Election result Assembly, Onondaga Co. at project "A New Nation Votes"
- Election result Assembly, Rensselaer Co. at project "A New Nation Votes"
- Election result Assembly, Schenectady Co. at project "A New Nation Votes"
- Election result Assembly, Schoharie Co. at project "A New Nation Votes"
- Election result Assembly, Tompkins Co. transcribed from Landmarks of Tompkins County, NY by John H. Selkreg (1894; Ch. VI)
- Partial election result Senate, Middle D. at project "A New Nation Votes" [gives only votes from Albany, Clinton and Greene Co.]
- Partial election result Senate, Eastern D. at project "A New Nation Votes" [gives only votes from Jefferson, Montgomery, Rensselaer and Schenectady Co.]
- Partial election result Senate, Western D. at project "A New Nation Votes" [gives only votes of Chautauqua and Genesee Co.]
- Election result Assembly Speaker at project "A New Nation Votes"
- Election result Council of Appointment at project "A New Nation Votes"
