= 37th New York State Legislature =

New York state legislative session

←	36th	38th	→
- The Old State Capitol (1879)

Overview
- Legislative body: New York State Legislature
- Jurisdiction: New York, United States
- Term: July 1, 1813 – June 30, 1814

Senate
- Members: 32
- President: Lt. Gov. John Tayler (Dem.-Rep.)
- Party control: Dem.-Rep. (26–5)

Assembly
- Members: 112
- Speaker: James Emott (Fed.)
- Party control: Federalist (58–48)

Sessions
- 1st: January 25 – April 15, 1814

The 37th New York State Legislature, consisting of the New York State Senate and the New York State Assembly, met from January 25 to April 15, 1814, during the seventh year of Daniel D. Tompkins's governorship, in Albany.

== Background ==
Under the provisions of the New York Constitution of 1777, amended by the Constitutional Convention of 1801, 32 Senators were elected on general tickets in the four senatorial districts for four-year terms. They were divided into four classes, and every year eight Senate seats came up for election. Assemblymen were elected countywide on general tickets to a one-year term, the whole Assembly being renewed annually.

In 1797, Albany was declared the State capital, and all subsequent Legislatures have been meeting there ever since. In 1799, the Legislature enacted that future Legislatures meet on the last Tuesday of January of each year unless called earlier by the governor.

In 1812, Putnam County was split from Dutchess County, and in 1813 was apportioned 1 seat in the Assembly, taken from Dutchess. In 1813, Warren County was split from Washington County, but both remained together in one Assembly district.

On February 4, 1813, a caucus of 48 Democratic-Republican legislators nominated unanimously Gov. Daniel D. Tompkins for re-election. State Senator John Tayler was nominated for Lieutenant Governor with 32 votes against 16 for the incumbent DeWitt Clinton.

On February 11, 1813, a Federalist caucus, presided over by Egbert Benson, nominated Stephen Van Rensselaer for Governor, and Assemblyman George Huntington for Lieutenant Governor.

At this time the politicians were divided into two opposing political parties: the Federalists and the Democratic-Republicans.

== Elections ==
The State election was held from April 27 to 29, 1813. Gov. Daniel D. Tompkins was re-elected; and State Senator John Tayler was elected Lieutenant Governor; both were Democratic-Republicans.

Jonathan Dayton (Southern D.), Lucas Elmendorf, Samuel G. Verbryck (both Middle D.), James Cochran, Samuel Stewart (both Eastern D.), Henry Bloom, Perley Keyes and Farrand Stranahan (all three Western D.) were elected to the Senate. Cochran and Stewart were Federalists, the other six were Democratic-Republicans.

== Sessions ==
The Legislature met at the Old State Capitol in Albany on January 25, 1814; and adjourned on April 15.

James Emott (Fed.) was elected Speaker with 58 votes against 48 for William Ross (Dem.-Rep.). John F. Bacon (Dem.-Rep.) was elected Clerk of the Senate.

== State Senate ==
=== Districts ===
- The Southern District (5 seats) consisted of Kings, New York, Queens, Richmond, Suffolk and Westchester counties.
- The Middle District (7 seats) consisted of Dutchess, Orange, Ulster, Columbia, Delaware, Rockland, Greene, Sullivan and Putnam counties.
- The Eastern District (8 seats) consisted of Washington, Clinton, Rensselaer, Albany, Saratoga, Essex, Montgomery, Franklin, Schenectady and Warren counties.
- The Western District (12 seats) consisted of Herkimer, Ontario, Otsego, Tioga, Onondaga, Schoharie, Steuben, Chenango, Oneida, Cayuga, Genesee, Seneca, Jefferson, Lewis, St. Lawrence, Allegany, Broome, Madison, Niagara, Cortland, Cattaraugus and Chautauqua counties.
Note: There are now 62 counties in the State of New York. The counties which are not mentioned in this list had not yet been established, or sufficiently organized, the area being included in one or more of the abovementioned counties.

=== Members ===
The asterisk (*) denotes members of the previous Legislature who continued in office as members of this Legislature.

District	Senators	Term left	Party	Notes
Southern	Ebenezer White*	1 year	Dem.-Rep.	
Southern	Nathan Sanford*	2 years	Dem.-Rep.	also United States Attorney for the District of New York
Southern	Elbert H. Jones*	3 years	Federalist	elected to the Council of Appointment
Southern	Peter W. Radcliff*	3 years	Federalist	
Southern	Jonathan Dayton	4 years	Dem.-Rep.	
Middle	Morgan Lewis*	1 year	Dem.-Rep.	elected to the Council of Appointment
Middle	James W. Wilkin*	1 year	Dem.-Rep.	
Middle	Erastus Root*	2 years	Dem.-Rep.	
Middle	William Taber*	2 years	Dem.-Rep.	
Middle	Martin Van Buren*	3 years	Dem.-Rep.	
Middle	Lucas Elmendorf	4 years	Dem.-Rep.	
Middle	Samuel G. Verbryck	4 years	Dem.-Rep.	
Eastern	Henry Yates Jr.*	1 year	Dem.-Rep.	
Eastern	Elisha Arnold*	2 years	Dem.-Rep.	
Eastern	Kitchel Bishop*	2 years	Dem.-Rep.	
Eastern	Ruggles Hubbard*	2 years	Dem.-Rep.	
Eastern	vacant	2 years		John Tayler was elected Lieutenant Governor of New York
Eastern	Gerrit Wendell*	3 years	Federalist	
Eastern	James Cochran	4 years	Federalist	
Eastern	Samuel Stewart	4 years	Federalist	elected to the Council of Appointment
Western	Reuben Humphrey*	1 year	Dem.-Rep.	
Western	Nathan Smith*	1 year	Dem.-Rep.	
Western	Philetus Swift*	1 year	Dem.-Rep.	
Western	Henry A. Townsend*	1 year	Dem.-Rep.	elected to the Council of Appointment
Western	Casper M. Rouse*	2 years	Dem.-Rep.	
Western	Russell Attwater*	3 years	Dem.-Rep.	
Western	Francis A. Bloodgood*	3 years	Dem.-Rep.	
Western	Archibald S. Clarke*	3 years	Dem.-Rep.	
Western	Henry Hager*	3 years	Dem.-Rep.	
Western	Henry Bloom	4 years	Dem.-Rep.	
Western	Perley Keyes	4 years	Dem.-Rep.	
Western	Farrand Stranahan	4 years	Dem.-Rep.	

=== Employees ===
- Clerk: John F. Bacon

== State Assembly ==
=== Districts ===
- Albany County (4 seats)
- Allegany and Steuben counties (1 seat)
- Broome County (1 seat)
- Cattaraugus, Chautauqua and Niagara counties (1 seat)
- Cayuga County (3 seats)
- Chenango County (3 seats)
- Clinton and Franklin counties (1 seat)
- Columbia County (4 seats)
- Cortland County (1 seat)
- Delaware County (2 seats)
- Dutchess County (5 seats)
- Essex County (1 seat)
- Genesee County (1 seat)
- Greene County (2 seats)
- Herkimer County (3 seats)
- Jefferson County (2 seats)
- Kings County (1 seat)
- Lewis County (1 seat)
- Madison County (3 seats)
- Montgomery County (5 seats)
- The City and County of New York (11 seats)
- Oneida County (5 seats)
- Onondaga County (2 seats)
- Ontario County (5 seats)
- Orange County (4 seats)
- Otsego County (4 seats)
- Putnam County (1 seat)
- Queens County (3 seats)
- Rensselaer County (4 seats)
- Richmond County (1 seat)
- Rockland County (1 seat)
- St. Lawrence County (1 seat)
- Saratoga County (4 seats)
- Schenectady County (2 seats)
- Schoharie County (2 seats)
- Seneca County (1 seat)
- Suffolk County (3 seats)
- Sullivan and Ulster counties (4 seats)
- Tioga County (1 seat)
- Warren and Washington counties (5 seats)
- Westchester County (3 seats)
Note: There are now 62 counties in the State of New York. The counties which are not mentioned in this list had not yet been established, or sufficiently organized, the area being included in one or more of the abovementioned counties.

=== Assemblymen ===
The asterisk (*) denotes members of the previous Legislature who continued as members of this Legislature.

District	Assemblymen	Party	Notes
Albany	Harmanus Bleecker	Federalist	
Albany	Johann Jost Dietz	Federalist	
Albany	Moses Smith	Federalist	
Albany	John L. Winne		
Allegany and Steuben	Daniel Cruger	Dem.-Rep.	
Broome	John H. Avery		
Cattaraugus, Chautauqua and Niagara	Jonas Williams*	Dem.-Rep.	
Cayuga	William C. Bennet*	Dem.-Rep.	
Cayuga	Silas Bowker		
Cayuga	William Satterlee*	Dem.-Rep.	
Chenango	James Houghteling		
Chenango	John Noyes	Dem.-Rep.	
Chenango	Hascall Ransford		
Clinton and Franklin	Allen R. Moore*	Federalist	
Columbia	Henry Rockefeller		
Columbia	John L. Van Alen Jr.		
Columbia	Jacob R. Van Rensselaer*	Federalist	also Secretary of State of New York
Columbia	Elisha Williams*	Federalist	
Cortland	William Mallery	Dem.-Rep.	
Delaware	John T. More		
Delaware	Isaac Ogden	Dem.-Rep.	
Dutchess	William Alexander Duer	Federalist	
Dutchess	James Emott	Federalist	elected Speaker
Dutchess	Samuel Mott	Federalist	
Dutchess	Joseph Potter	Federalist	
Dutchess	Jesse Thompson	Federalist	
Essex	Levi Thompson	Federalist	
Genesee	James Ganson*	Dem.-Rep.	
Greene	William Fraser		
Greene	Abraham Van Dyck		
Herkimer	Christopher P. Bellinger	Dem.-Rep.	
Herkimer	Jonas Cleland	Dem.-Rep.	
Herkimer	Aaron Hackley, Jr.	Dem.-Rep.	
Jefferson	Clark Allen*	Federalist	
Jefferson	Ethel Bronson	Federalist	
Kings	Jeremiah Lott	Federalist	
Lewis	Chillus Doty		
Madison	Stephen F. Blackstone		
Madison	Elisha Carrington		
Madison	Abraham D. Van Horne		
Montgomery	Samuel A. Gilbert		
Montgomery	James Knox		
Montgomery	Gabriel Manny		
Montgomery	Sylvanus Wilcox		
Montgomery	Andrew Zabriskie		
New York	John B. Coles	Federalist	
New York	Isaac S. Douglass*	Federalist	
New York	Gabriel Furman	Federalist	
New York	Richard Hatfield Jr.*		
New York	Samuel Jones Jr.*	Federalist	
New York	Charles King	Federalist	
New York	Elisha W. King		
New York	David B. Ogden	Federalist	
New York	James Palmer		
New York	Abraham Russell*	Federalist	
New York	James Smith*	Federalist	
Oneida	Isaac Brayton	Federalist	
Oneida	Laurens Hull		
Oneida	James Lynch	Federalist	
Oneida	Henry McNeil	Federalist	
Oneida	Theodore Sill	Federalist	
Onondaga	Barnet Mooney	Dem.-Rep.	
Onondaga	Moses Nash	Dem.-Rep.	
Ontario	Hugh McNair		
Ontario	Stephen Phelps		
Ontario	David Sutherland*		
Ontario	Joshua Vanfleet		
Ontario	Asahel Warner*	Dem.-Rep.	
Orange	William Ross*	Dem.-Rep.	
Orange	Joshua Sayre		
Orange	Benjamin Strong		
Orange	Benjamin Webb		
Otsego	Erastus Crafts*		
Otsego	Abel DeForest*		
Otsego	Samuel Griffin*		
Otsego	James Hyde*	Federalist	
Putnam	Joshua Barnum Jr.		
Queens	Stephen Carman*	Federalist	
Queens	John Fleet*	Federalist	
Queens	Daniel Kissam	Federalist	
Rensselaer	William Bradley	Federalist	
Rensselaer	Burton Hammond	Federalist	
Rensselaer	Bethel Mather	Federalist	
Rensselaer	Barent Van Vleck	Federalist	
Richmond	James Guyon, Jr.*	Dem.-Rep.	
Rockland	Peter S. Van Orden*	Dem.-Rep.	
St. Lawrence	Louis Hasbrouck		also Clerk of St. Lawrence Co.
Saratoga	Nicholas W. Angle		
Saratoga	John Dunning		
Saratoga	Avery Starkweather		
Saratoga	Samuel Young	Dem.-Rep.	
Schenectady	Abraham Van Ingen	Federalist	
Schenectady	Lawrence Vrooman	Federalist	
Schoharie	William C. Bouck	Dem.-Rep.	
Schoharie	William Dietz		
Seneca	James McCall*		
Suffolk	Jonathan S. Conklin	Dem.-Rep.	
Suffolk	Thomas S. Lester	Dem.-Rep.	
Suffolk	Nathaniel Potter	Dem.-Rep.	
Sullivan and Ulster	Coenrad Bevier	Dem.-Rep.	
Sullivan and Ulster	Daniel Clark	Dem.-Rep.	
Sullivan and Ulster	John Kiersted		
Sullivan and Ulster	Green Miller		
Tioga	Caleb Baker	Dem.-Rep.	
Warren and Washington	Paul Dennis		
Warren and Washington	Samuel Gordon		
Warren and Washington	John Richards	Dem.-Rep.	contested; seat vacated
Warren and Washington	John Savage	Dem.-Rep.	also District Attorney of the 4th District
Warren and Washington	Charles Starbuck		
Warren and Washington	John White		seated on February 17, 1814, in place of John Richards
Westchester	William Barker*	Federalist	
Westchester	Abraham Miller*	Dem.-Rep.	
Westchester	Richard Valentine Morris	Federalist	

=== Employees ===
- Clerk: James Van Ingen
- Sergeant-at-Arms: David Olmstead
- Doorkeeper: Benjamin Whipple

== Sources ==
- The New York Civil List compiled by Franklin Benjamin Hough (Weed, Parsons and Co., 1858) [see pg. 108f for Senate districts; pg. 122 for senators; pg. 148f for Assembly districts; pg. 188 for assemblymen]
- The History of Political Parties in the State of New-York, from the Ratification of the Federal Constitution to 1840 by Jabez D. Hammond (4th ed., Vol. 1, H. & E. Phinney, Cooperstown, 1846; pages 354–375)
- Election result Assembly, Broome Co. at project "A New Nation Votes", compiled by Phil Lampi, hosted by Tufts University Digital Library
- Partial election result Assembly, Clinton and Franklin Co. at project "A New Nation Votes" [gives only votes from Clinton Co.]
- Election result Assembly, Cortland Co. at project "A New Nation Votes"
- Election result Assembly, Dutchess Co. at project "A New Nation Votes"
- Election result Assembly, Essex Co. at project "A New Nation Votes"
- Election result Assembly, Greene Co. at project "A New Nation Votes"
- Election result Assembly, Herkimer Co. at project "A New Nation Votes"
- Election result Assembly, Kings Co. at project "A New Nation Votes"
- Election result Assembly, Onondaga Co. at project "A New Nation Votes"
- Election result Assembly, Queens Co. at project "A New Nation Votes"
- Election result Assembly, Rensselaer Co. at project "A New Nation Votes"
- Election result Assembly, Richmond Co. at project "A New Nation Votes"
- Election result Assembly, Suffolk Co. at project "A New Nation Votes"
- Partial election result Senate, Southern D. at project "A New Nation Votes" [gives only votes of Queens, Richmond and Suffolk Co.]
- Partial election result Senate, Middle D. at project "A New Nation Votes" [gives only votes of Dutchess and Greene Co.)
- Partial election result Senate, Eastern D. at project "A New Nation Votes" [gives only votes of Rensselaer Co.]
- Partial election result Senate, Western D. at project "A New Nation Votes" [gives only votes of Broome, Herkimer and Onondaga Co.]
- Election result, Speaker at project "A New Nation Votes"
- Election result, Council of Appointment at project "A New Nation Votes"
