= Senator Cantine =

Senator Cantine may refer to:

- John Cantine (1735–1808), New York State Senate
- Moses I. Cantine (1774–1823), New York State Senate
