= John Schoolcraft =

John Schoolcraft may refer to:

- John L. Schoolcraft, U.S. Representative from New York
- John Schoolcraft (assemblyman), member of the New York State Assembly
