= Senator Stranahan =

Senator Stranahan may refer to:

- Farrand Stewart Stranahan (1842–1904), Vermont State Senate
- Farrand Stranahan (1778–1826), New York State Senate
- Nevada N. Stranahan (1861–1928), New York State Senate
