= Darius Crosby =

American politician

Darius Crosby (ca. 1768 – November 18, 1818 Somers, Westchester County, New York) was an American politician from New York.

== Life ==
Crosby was a member of the New York State Assembly (Westchester Co.) in 1811 and 1812.

He was a member of the New York State Senate (Southern D.) from 1814 until his death, sitting in the 38th, 39th, 40th and 41st New York State Legislatures; and was a member of the Council of Appointment in 1816.

He was re-elected in 1818 to another four-year term, but died before the Legislature met for the next session, and was buried at the Presbyterian Cemetery in Somers, NY.

== Sources ==
- Death notice at RootsWeb [gives death date Nov. 17, as transcribed from newspaper]
- Crosby genealogy at RootsWeb [gives death date Nov. 18, as transcribed from cemetery]
- The New York Civil List compiled by Franklin Benjamin Hough (pages 122f, 140, 185f and 268; Weed, Parsons and Co., 1858)
