= Perley Keyes =

American politician (1774-1834)

Perley Keyes (February 24, 1774 in – May 13, 1834) was an American politician from New York.

== Life ==
Keyes was born in Acworth, then in Cheshire County, now in Sullivan County, New Hampshire, the son of Capt. William Keyes (born 1740) and Hannah (Scarborough) Keyes. On November 20, 1796, he married Lorinda White, and they had three children. They moved to Rutland, New York in 1800.

Keyes was an associate judge of the Jefferson County Court in 1807, and Sheriff of Jefferson County from 1808 to 1812. One historian noted the following: "Judge Keyes, as he was called, was without early educational privileges, and, like many of his contemporaries, was being launched upon the world unaided and alone. He had a powerful frame, a well-balanced brain, and a sanguine temperament."

Keyes was a member of the New York State Senate (Western D.) from 1814 to 1815, sitting in the 37th and 38th; and (Eastern D.) from 1816 to 1817, sitting in the 39th and 40th New York State Legislatures. While in the Senate, Keyes was nominated on November 18, and confirmed by the U.S. Senate on December 9, 1814, as Collector of Customs at Sackett's Harbor. He was also a member of the Council of Appointment in 1816.

In 1820, Keyes, who opposed slavery, ran for a seat in the U.S. Congress against attorney Micah Sterling, a graduate of Yale College who owned a slave. Even though he won the vote in Watertown, N.Y., Keyes lost his bid for Congress because he did not have enough support in Jefferson County. He was again a member of the State Senate (5th D.) from 1824 to 1827, sitting in the 47th, 48th, 49th and 50th New York State Legislatures.

Keyes and his friend Silas Wright were both stalwart supporters of Martin Van Buren. After his presidency, Van Buren described his deceased friend in the following way: "[W]hile [Keyes'] want of education was often embarrassing to himself and his friends, still his profound knowledge of the springs of human action always seemed to be an ample compensation; and that he had never met the man whom he thought the Almighty had created shrewder than Perley Keyes."

At age sixty, Keyes was struck down by "apoplexy" and died on May 13, 1834. Upon Keyes' death in Watertown, New York his political understudy Orville Hungerford took over the Democratic Party in Jefferson County, New York.

== Sources ==
- Genealogy of the Descendants of John White of Wenham and Lancaster, Mass. by Almira Larkin White (1900; Vol. 2; pg. 430)
- History of Acworth by John Leverett Merrill (pg. 233)
- The New York Civil List compiled by Franklin Benjamin Hough (pages 122f, 125ff, 142 and 401; Weed, Parsons and Co., 1858)
- Journal of the Executive Proceedings of the U.S. Senate (1828; Vol. II; pg. 586-590)

New York State Senate
Preceded by Samuel Beardsley	New York State Senate; Fifth District (Class 1); 1824 - 1827	Succeeded by Nathaniel S. Benton
