= Thomas Donnelly (sergeant-at-arms) =

Thomas Donnelly (1764–1835) was Sergeant-at-Arms of the New York State Assembly from 1806 to 1813, and from 1814 to 1817.

== Biography ==
He was born in 1764.

His parents were married in Trinity Church, Manhattan. At the outbreak of the revolution, his family was forced to move away from Manhattan because his father Peter was an outspoken well known patriot (Sons of Liberty). They bought a tavern in Newburgh, New York. Peter Donnelly was a Minuteman in the Militia. Newburgh was later the location of George Washington's headquarters from 1781 to 1782.

At the age of 14, Thomas Donnelly fought in the American Revolutionary War as an express rider messenger for Washington. His rank later was private in the regular army. His pension papers are at the national archives. Thomas Donnelly married Ruth Pettinger (1768–1838). Their daughter Hester Donnelly married Ulysses F. Doubleday (1792–1866).

In 1805, Donnelly stood, unsuccessfully, for the post of state senator for the eastern district of New York. He was elected Sergeant-at-Arms during the sessions of the 29th, 30th, 31st, 32nd, 33rd, 34th, 35th, 36th, 38th, 39th and 40th New York State Legislatures. In 1810, at the start of the 33rd legislature, Donnelly stood as a Republican and was elected with a majority of 5, over his federalist rival, Jacob C. Cuyler. In 1818, Donnelly was unsuccessful in the election for sergeant-at-arms, losing out to Caleb Benjamin.

He died in 1835.

== Legacy ==
Thomas's grandchildren were Colonel Thomas D. Doubleday (1816–1864), Abner Doubleday (1819–1893), General Ulysses Doubleday (1824–1893).
