= Tibbits House =

Historic house in New York, United States

- U.S. National Register of Historic Places
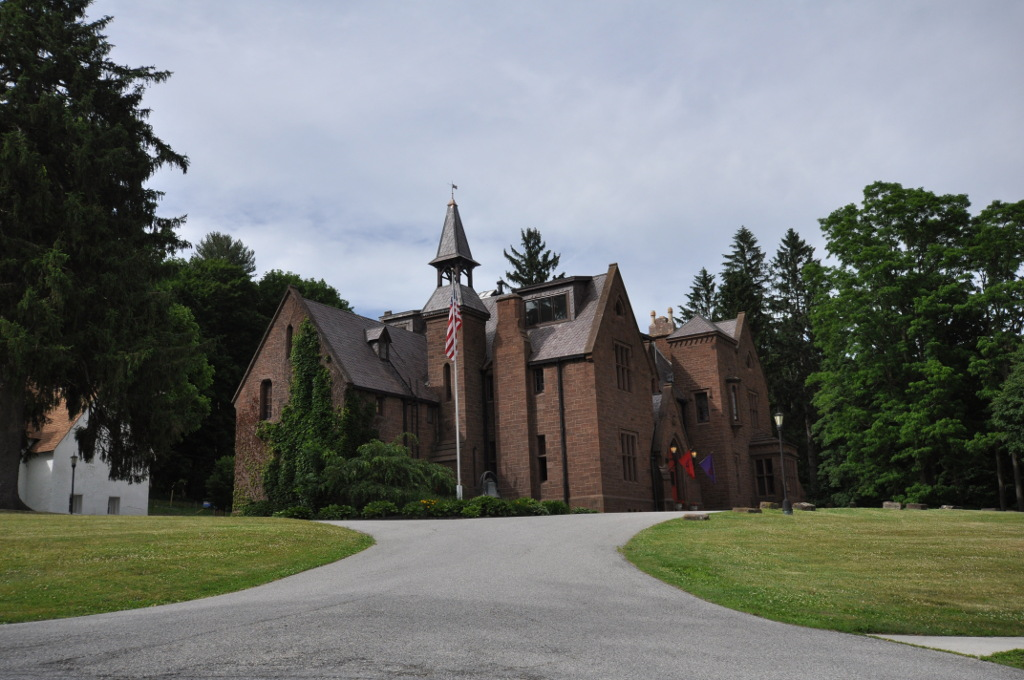

- Location within New York Location within the United States
- Location: S of Hoosick at jct. of NY 22 and NY 7, Hoosick, New York
- Coordinates: 42°51′28″N 73°20′37″W
- Area: less than one acre
- Built: 1860
- Architect: Tibbits, George Mortimer
- Architectural style: Gothic Revival
- NRHP reference No.: 78001899
- Added to NRHP: May 22, 1978

Tibbits House, also known as Tibbits Hall, is a historic home located at Hoosick in Rensselaer County, New York. The house was built about 1860 and 1 1/2-story, rectangular Gothic Revival–style building. It is constructed of cut ashlar sandstone blocks and has steeply pitched gable roofs covered with fishscale slate. It features projecting porches, bay windows, changes of rooflines, dormers, chimneys, and two towers. The existing house on the property was originally owned by U.S. Congressman George Tibbits (1763–1849); his son George Mortimer Tibbits (1796–1878) built the Tibbits House. At the time the property was bought by the Tibbits it was the location of a wooden house built before the Revolution by a Loyalist named Pfister. The Tibbits estate was a stop on the Underground Railroad. The building was acquired by Hoosac School in 1952 and is used as a dormitory, classrooms, and for administrative offices.

It was listed on the National Register of Historic Places in 1978.
