= Asa Wells =

Member of the New York General Assembly

Personal details
- Born: August 6, 1774 Colchester, Connecticut
- Died: February 1859 (aged 84)

Asa Wells (August 6, 1774 – February 1859) was a pioneer farmer and surveyor from Pompey, New York who served two terms in the New York State Assembly.

== Background ==
Wells was born August 6, 1774, in Colchester, Connecticut. He settled in Pompey in the spring of 1803, built a log house at Pompey Hill, and in 1807 relocated to a more distant farm. Wells was a practical surveyor and assisted Judge Geddes in the survey for the Oswego Canal. He married the former Chloe Hyde, who lived until 1872. He was prominent in the militia, in which he was captain at the time Sackett's Harbor, New York, was threatened by the British, and led his company to that point. On May 3, 1834, Wells was one of the founders of the first Disciples of Christ church in Pompey, and became one of its first elders.

== Public office ==
He held various town offices and served in the 40th New York State Legislature and 41st New York State Legislature (1816–18) as a member of the New York State Assembly representing Onondaga County. In the 1816 election he was one of four victorious Democratic-Republican candidates, with 2,031 votes to 1,507 for the highest Federalist candidate, Nicholas P. Randall. In the 1817 race, he was once again the least successful of the four "Old Line" Democratic-Republican winners, coming out ahead of former Assemblyman Jonathan Stanley, Jr. running as a "Clintonian" or "New Line" candidate, with 1,380 vote to Stanley's 724.

He was a candidate in the 1822 United States House of Representatives elections in New York for the 23rd Congressional District. Wells was now identified with the Clintonian faction of the state's Democratic-Republican Party, losing with 1,387 votes to 2,042 for Elisha Litchfield, identified with the Bucktails or Anti-Clintonian faction.

He died in February, 1859.
