= Roswell Weston =

American politician

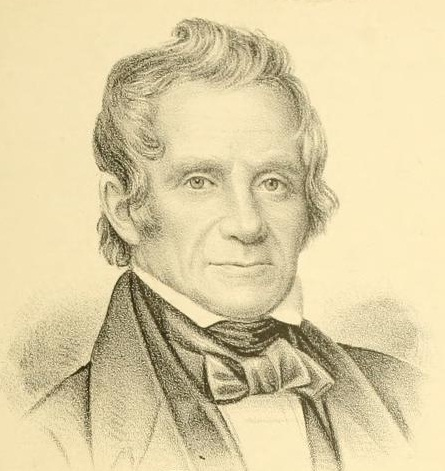
Roswell Weston

Roswell Weston (February 24, 1774 – August 18, 1861) was an American lawyer and politician from New York.

== Life ==
He was born on February 24, 1774, in Kent, Litchfield County, Connecticut, the son of Zachariah Weston (1749–1828) and Mary (Lathrop) Weston (born 1748). He studied law with John Woodworth in Troy, was admitted to the bar in 1796, and commenced the practice of law in Fort Edward. Soon after he moved to Sandy Hill, the county seat. In 1801, he married Lydia Willoughby (1783–1834), and they had five children.

Weston was the first Postmaster of Sandy Hill; a Justice of the Peace, appointed in 1807; and an associate judge of the Washington County Court.

He was a member of the New York State Assembly (Warren and Washington Co.) in 1816; and First Judge of the Washington County Court from 1825 to 1826.

He died on August 18, 1861, in Sandy Hill; and was buried at the Union Cemetery in Fort Edward.
