= William Campbell (surveyor) =

American politician

For other persons with a similar name see William Campbell (disambiguation)

William Campbell (ca. 1767 – October 27, 1844 Cherry Valley, Otsego County, New York) was an American medical doctor, merchant, surveyor and politician from New York.

== Life ==
He was the oldest son of American Revolutionary War Colonel Samuel Campbell (1738–1824) and Jane Cannon Campbell (1743–1836).

He ran a drug and hardware store in Cherry Valley.

He was a member of the New York State Assembly (Otsego Co.) in 1816 and 1817 as a Federalist, and in 1827.

He was New York State Surveyor General from 1835 to 1838.

U.S. Representative William W. Campbell was his nephew.

== Sources ==
- Obit of his nephew John C. Campbell in NYT on March 27, 1890
- Campbell genealogy at GeoCities
- Campbell genealogy at RootsWeb
- Political Graveyard
- The New York Civil List compiled by Franklin Benjamin Hough (pages 37f and 263; Weed, Parsons and Co., 1858)
- Dr. Campbell mentioned in Note 2
- History of Cherry Valley (page 59)
- The American Biographical Dictionary by William Allen (page 189; John P. Jewett & Co, Boston, 1857)
- The American Almanac for 1845 (page 314)

Political offices
Preceded by Simeon De Witt	New York State Surveyor General; 1835–1838	Succeeded by Orville L. Holley
