= John J. Prendergast =

New York State Senator (1814-1818)

John Jeffrey Prendergast

New York State Senate
- In office July 1, 1814 – June 30, 1818

Personal details
- Born: Pawling, New York
- Occupation: Politician

John Jeffrey Prendergast was an American politician who served in the New York State Senate from 1814 to 1818.

== Biography ==
Prendergast was born in Pawling, New York, a son of William Prendergast, Sr. (1727-1811) and Mehetabel Wing (1738-1812). Among his siblings included Jediah Prendergast, a New York State Senator, and James Prendergast, the founder and namesake of Jamestown, New York. After the American Revolution, the Prendergast family, consisting of the children, grandchildren, and servants, traveled to Wheeling, West Virginia and then to Louisville, Kentucky, before they arrived in Memphis, Tennessee. Unsatisfied, the family moved to Upper Canada in what is now Ontario.

While most of his family settled in Chautauqua County, John settled in Herkimer County. Prendergast entered politics and was elected to a three-year-term in the New York State Senate as a member of the Democratic-Republican Party and served in the 38th, 39th, 40th, and 41st representing the Eastern District from July 1, 1814, to June 30, 1818. In 1817, he was appointed to the Council of Appointment as a representative for the Eastern District for the year.

Prendergast had two children: William and Martin. He later moved to Brooklyn.
