= David Woods (New York politician) =

American lawyer and politician

David Woods (May 21, 1775 – September 15, 1842) was an American lawyer and politician who was Speaker of the New York State Assembly for two terms.

== Biography ==
Woods was born in Ireland on May 21, 1775. His family immigrated to the United States in 1786, and Woods lived in Salem, New York. He was Sheriff of Washington County from 1806 to 1810.

He was a Democratic-Republican member of the New York State Assembly from Washington County in 1811, and from Washington and Warren Counties in 1816–17. Then he moved to Madison and practiced law there. He was again a member of the Assembly in 1818, this time from Madison County. He was Speaker in 1816–17 and 1818.

In 1821, he lost the election for Congress to Thomas H. Hubbard. From 1825 to 1831, he was a Canal Appraiser. In 1826, he was again a member of the Assembly from Washington County. Afterwards, he was a judge of the Washington County Court.

Woods died at the home of his son in Cambria, New York on September 15, 1842.

His daughter Pamela was the wife of Samuel Nelson, who served as an Associate Justice of the Supreme Court of the United States.

Political offices
Preceded by Daniel Cruger	Speaker of the New York State Assembly; 1816–1818	Succeeded by Obadiah German
