= Council of Appointment =

The Council of Appointment (sometimes also Council of Appointments) was a body of the Government of New York that existed from 1777 to 1822.

== History ==
Under the New York Constitution of 1777, the Council of Appointment consisted of the Governor of New York, who was ex officio president of this council but had only a casting vote, and four members of the New York State Senate, one each from the state's senatorial electoral districts. These state senators were elected for a one-year term by the New York State Assembly and could not be re-elected for the following term.

The Council had the power to appoint all state, county and municipal officials within the state of New York for which no other means of appointment or election was provided for in the State Constitution. The offices filled by the Council included the State Comptroller, the Secretary of State, the Attorney General, the Surveyor General, the Chancellor, the justices of the New York Supreme Court, sheriffs, district attorneys, judges, surrogates, city and county clerks, mayors (including the Mayor of New York City), all military officers and many others.

The Council of Appointment had its origins in the fear of too much popular influence in the government. The first New York Constitution was aristocratic and elitist in spirit. As long as the governor alone nominated appointees, he had as much power over the state's patronage as a medieval king. On the other side, during the long tenure of Governor George Clinton, very rarely an office holder was removed, and the Council only filled vacancies as they occurred by resignation, death, declination of re-appointment, or term limit.

Troubles, however, arose after the Federalist Party and the Democratic-Republican Party appeared, and began to alternate as majority in the Assembly. Because of the lack of clarity in the 1777 New York Constitution, the parties struggled over who, exactly, held the power to make nominations and appointments. The constitution stated that the governor would have the "casting voice, but no other vote; and with the advice and consent of the said council..." The custom arose that the governor made the nominations, and the Council approved, or rejected, them. But when the legislature had a majority of the opposition, they would elect three or four senators and outvote the governor. Governor John Jay, who had drafted the Constitution, asserted that the Council could not propose appointees, only vote for or against the governor's nominees. So when the Council voted down all of his nominees, in his opinion, nobody could be appointed. The question was settled at the New York State Constitutional Convention of 1801, which amended the Constitution, giving the right of nomination to the governor and each one of the Council members concurrently. This led to an annual scramble for office, especially if the majority in the Assembly changed.

Alexander Hamilton criticized the Council in his Federalist No. 77.

The council was abolished by the New York State Constitutional Convention of 1821 and ceased to exist at the end of the year 1822, at which time more than 15,000 offices had been under its control. Under the Constitution of 1821, the State cabinet officers and Supreme Court justices were elected by the State Legislature, and most of the county and local officers were elected in local popular or legislative elections. The governor continued to appoint only a very small number of officers and had the right to make recess appointments.

== List of members ==
| Southern D. | Middle D. | Eastern D. | Western D. | Elected on |
|---|---|---|---|---|
| John Morin Scott | Jesse Woodhull | Alexander Webster | Abraham Yates Jr. | September 16, 1777 |
| Jonathan Lawrence | Zephaniah Platt | Ebenezer Russell | Dirck Wessel Ten Broeck | October 17, 1778 |
| Isaac Roosevelt | Levi Pawling | Alexander Webster | Rinier Mynderse | September 11, 1779 |
| Stephen Ward | Ephraim Paine | Ebenezer Russell | Abraham Ten Broeck | September 11, 1780 |
| Stephen Ward | Arthur Parks | Ebenezer Russell | Abraham Ten Broeck | March 23, 1781 |
| Isaac Stoutenburgh | Zephaniah Platt | Alexander Webster | Henry Oothoudt | October 25, 1781 |
| Jonathan Lawrence | John Haring | Elkanah Day | William B. Whiting | July 22, 1782 |
| Ezra L'Hommedieu | Jacobus Swartwout | Alexander Webster | Abraham Yates Jr. | January 21, 1784 |
| Isaac Roosevelt | Joseph Gasherie | Ebenezer Russell | William B. Whiting | October 19, 1784 |
| Lewis Morris | Jacobus Swartwout | David Hopkins | Philip Schuyler | January 19, 1786 |
| William Floyd | John Hathorn | Ebenezer Russell | Peter Schuyler | January 18, 1787 |
| John Vanderbilt | Anthony Hoffman | David Hopkins | Philip Schuyler | January 18, 1788 |
| Samuel Townsend | John Hathorn | John Williams | Peter Van Ness | January 2, 1789 |
| Philip Livingston | John Cantine | Edward Savage | Philip Schuyler | January 15, 1790 |
| Isaac Roosevelt | Thomas Tillotson | Alexander Webster | Peter Schuyler | January 14, 1791 |
| Philip Van Cortlandt | David Pye | William Powers | Stephen Van Rensselaer | January 14, 1792 |
| David Gelston | Joseph Hasbrouck | Robert Woodworth | John Frey | January 14, 1793 |
| Selah Strong | Reuben Hopkins | Zina Hitchcock | Philip Schuyler | January 7, 1794 |
| Richard Hatfield | Joseph Hasbrouck | William Powers | Jacobus Van Schoonhoven | January 6, 1795 |
| Joshua Sands | Abraham Schenck | Ebenezer Russell | Michael Myers | January 7, 1796 |
| Andrew Onderdonk | Ambrose Spencer | Leonard Gansevoort | Thomas Morris | January 9, 1797 |
| Ezra L'Hommedieu | William Thompson | Moses Vail | Joseph White | January 8, 1798 |
| William Denning | Ebenezer Foote | Ebenezer Clark | John Frey | January 4, 1799 |
| Samuel Haight | Robert Sands | James Gordon | Thomas R. Gold | January 28, 1800 |
| DeWitt Clinton | Ambrose Spencer | John Sanders | Robert Roseboom | November 7, 1800 |
| Benjamin Huntting | James W. Wilkin | Edward Savage | Lemuel Chipman | January 30, 1802 |
| Ebenezer Purdy | John C. Hogeboom | Jacobus Van Schoonhoven | Jacob Snell | February 8, 1803 |
| John Broome | Abraham Adriance | Thomas Tredwell | Caleb Hyde | February 7, 1804 |
| John Schenck | Joshua H. Brett | Stephen Thorn | Jedediah Peck | January 29, 1805 |
| DeWitt Clinton | Robert Johnson | Adam Comstock | Henry Huntington | January 31, 1806 |
| Thomas Thomas | James Burt | Edward Savage | John Nicholas | January 29, 1807 |
| Benjamin Coe | Peter C. Adams | John Veeder | Nathan Smith | January 29, 1808 |
| Jonathan Ward | James G. Graham | Isaac Kellogg | Alexander Rea | January 27, 1809 |
| Israel Carll | Robert Williams | Daniel Paris | Amos Hall | January 31, 1810 |
| Benjamin Coe | James W. Wilkin | John McLean | Philetus Swift | January 30, 1811 |
| William W. Gilbert | Johannes Bruyn | Henry Yates Jr. | Francis A. Bloodgood | February 1, 1812 |
| Peter W. Radcliff | James W. Wilkin | John Stearns | Jonas Platt | January 12, 1813 |
| Elbert H. Jones | Morgan Lewis | Samuel Stewart | Henry A. Townsend | January 25, 1814 |
| Jonathan Dayton | Lucas Elmendorf | Ruggles Hubbard | Farrand Stranahan | February 1, 1815 |
| Darius Crosby | William Ross | Perley Keyes | Archibald S. Clarke | February 5, 1816 |
| Walter Bowne | John Noyes | John J. Prendergast | Henry Bloom | February 2, 1817 |
| Peter R. Livingston | Jabez D. Hammond | Henry Yates Jr. | Henry Seymour | January 31, 1818 |
| Stephen Barnum | William Ross | George Rosecrantz | Stephen Bates | February 3, 1819 |
| John D. Ditmis | John Lounsbery | Levi Adams | Ephraim Hart | January 11, 1820 |
| Walter Bowne | John T. More | Roger Skinner | David E. Evans | November 8, 1820 |
| John Townsend | Charles E. Dudley | Benjamin Mooers | Perry G. Childs | January 10, 1822 |

== Sources ==
- The New York Civil List compiled by Franklin Benjamin Hough (pages 99f; Weed, Parsons and Co., 1858)
- The History of Political Parties in the State of New-York, from the Ratification of the Federal Constitution to 1840 by Jabez D. Hammond (4th ed., Vol. 1, H. & E. Phinney, Cooperstown, 1846)

== See also ==
- Council of Revision
