= Chauncey Loomis =

American politician

New York State Senate
- In office 1814 – April 6, 1817
- Succeeded by: Jediah Prendergast

New York State Assembly
- In office 1810–1811

Personal details
- Born: September 11, 1780
- Died: April 6, 1817 (aged 36) Albany, New York
- Resting place: Presbyterial Burial Ground; Albany, New York
- Occupation: Politician

Chauncey Loomis (September 11, 1780 – April 6, 1817, Albany, New York) was an American politician from New York.

== Life ==
Loomis was a member of the New York State Assembly (Genesee Co.) in 1810 and 1811.

He was a member of the New York State Senate (Western D.) from 1814 until his death, sitting in the 38th, 39th and 40th New York State Legislatures. He died near the end of the session of the Legislature, and was buried at the Presbyterial Burial Ground in Albany.

== Sources ==
- The Annals of Albany by Joel Munsell (Vol. 3; page 236)
- The New York Civil List compiled by Franklin Benjamin Hough (pages 122f, 143, 183f and 288; Weed, Parsons and Co., 1858)
