= Thomas Morris (New York politician) =

American politician

Member of the U.S. House of Representatives from New York's 10th district
- In office March 4, 1801 – March 3, 1803
- Preceded by: William Cooper
- Succeeded by: George Tibbits

Member of the New York State Assembly
- In office 1794–1796

Personal details
- Born: February 26, 1771 Philadelphia, Province of Pennsylvania, British America
- Died: March 12, 1849 (aged 78) New York City, New York, U.S.
- Party: Federalist
- Spouse: Elizabeth Sarah Kane
- Relations: William White (uncle)
- Parent(s): Robert Morris; Mary White Morris
- Education: University of Leipzig (1788)

Thomas Morris (February 26, 1771 – March 12, 1849) was an American lawyer and politician who served as a United States representative from New York from 1801 to 1803. He was the son of Founding Father Robert Morris.

== Early life ==
Morris was born on February 26, 1771, in Philadelphia in the Province of Pennsylvania to Robert Morris and Mary (née White) Morris. His father was a slave-trader, merchant, signer of the Declaration of Independence and the Constitution, and later a U.S. Senator. His mother's brother was William White, the Anglican Bishop of Pennsylvania.

From 1781 to 1786, he attended school in Geneva, Switzerland and the University of Leipzig, in Germany, from 1786 to 1788.

== Career ==
After studying abroad, Morris returned to Philadelphia and studied law; he was admitted to the bar and commenced practice in Canandaigua, New York. He was a member of the New York State Assembly from 1794 to 1796.

Morris was elected as a Federalist to the Seventh Congress, holding office from March 4, 1801, to March 3, 1803. He was not a candidate for renomination, and resumed the practice of law in New York City in 1803. He was appointed United States Marshal for the Southern District of New York in 1816, 1820, 1825, and 1829.

Morris was involved in negotiations with the Six Nations of the Iroquois Confederacy following the American Revolution. His father then sold his substantial property in Western New York, which the younger Morris oversaw, to the Holland Land Company in 1792–1793 for redevelopment in parcels, although some sources identify the sale at five years later, in 1797–1798.

== Personal life ==
Morris was married to Elizabeth Sarah Kane (1771–1853), the daughter of Col. John Kane (1734–1808) and Sybil Kent Kane. Elizabeth's brother, Elisha Kane, and sister-in-law, Alida Van Rensselaer, were the parents of John K. Kane (1795–1858), the Attorney General of Pennsylvania. Her sister, Sybil Adeline Kane, married Alida's brother, Jeremias Van Rensselaer (1769–1827), both children of Robert Van Rensselaer. Together, they were the parents of:

- Mary Morris (1800–1885), who married Charles Apthorp Van den Heuvel (d. 1879), son of Jan Cornelis Van den Heuvel.
- Sally Morris (1801–1848), who died unmarried.
- John Morris (1802–1879)
- Robert Kane Morris (1808–1833), who died unmarried.
- Henry White Morris (1805–1863), who died unmarried.
- Harriet Morris (1807–1882), who died unmarried.
- Emily Morris (1809–1884), who died unmarried.
- Archibald Morris (1811–1822), who died young.
- William Morris (1813–1817), who died young.
- Caroline Julia Morris (1814–1888), who married John Stark.
- William White Morris (1817–1866), who died unmarried.
- Charles Frederick Morris (1819–1874)

Morris died in 1849 in New York City.

U.S. House of Representatives
Preceded by William Cooper	Member of the U.S. House of Representatives from New York's 10th congressional district 1801–1803	Succeeded by George Tibbits
