= John Cantine =

American politician

Member-elect of the U.S. House of Representatives from New York's 7th district
- Declined to serve
- Preceded by: David Thomas
- Succeeded by: Josiah Hasbrouck

Personal details
- Born: Johannes Cantine; October 20, 1735 Marbletown, New York, British America
- Died: April 30, 1808 (aged 72) Caroline, New York, U.S.
- Party: Democratic-Republican
- Children: Moses

Johannes "John" Cantine (October 20, 1735 – April 30, 1808) was an American politician.

Born in Marbletown, New York, Cantine served in both houses of the New York Legislature. Cantine also served in the New York state convention concerning the ratification of the United States Constitution. In 1801, Cantine was elected as a Federalist to the United States House of Representatives, for the New York Seventh Congressional District, but declined to take the office. His son was Moses I. Cantine.

== See also ==
- List of United States representatives-elect who never took their seats

== Notes ==
U.S. House of Representatives
Preceded by David Thomas	Member-elect of the U.S. House of Representatives from New York's 7th congressional district 1802–1803	Succeeded by Josiah Hasbrouck
