= John Schoolcraft (assemblyman) =

American politician

John Schoolcraft was an American politician.

He was elected in 1815 as a member of the New York State Assembly (Albany County) for the 1815-1816 term. He had run for election to the Assembly, unsuccessfully, in three earlier elections: 1799; 1806 (getting only one vote); and 1807.

In 1816, he was a signatory to The Report of the Committee of Elections, in the Case of Peter Allen. Controversially, at the commencement of that year's session of the legislature, "the Clerk of the County of Ontario, had been prevailed upon, to give a certain Peter Allen, a certificate that he was duly elected a member of [the] Assembly, although, in fact, not he, but Mr. Henry Fellows, his competitor, had been so elected." At issue was whether ballots marked as "Hen. Fellows", rather than "Henry Fellows", should be counted towards Henry Fellows' tally, which would give him more votes than Peter Allen. The Committee, including Schoolcraft, advocated for seating Mr. Fellows, in place of Mr. Allen; and Fellows completed the legislative session.
