= Peter R. Livingston (politician, born 1766) =

American politician (1766–1847)

Peter Robert Livingston

Acting Lieutenant Governor of New York
- In office February 11, 1828 – October 17, 1828
- Governor: Nathaniel Pitcher
- Preceded by: Nathaniel Pitcher
- Succeeded by: Charles Dayan

Speaker of the New York State Assembly
- In office January 1, 1823 – December 31, 1823
- Preceded by: Samuel B. Romaine
- Succeeded by: Richard Goodell

Member of the New York State Assembly
- In office January 1, 1823 – December 31, 1823
- Preceded by: (no direct predecessor)
- Succeeded by: (no direct successor)

Member of the New York Senate from the 2nd district
- In office January 1, 1826 – December 31, 1829
- Preceded by: Stephen Thorn
- Succeeded by: Nathaniel P. Tallmadge

Member of the New York Senate from the Southern district
- In office July 1, 1815 – December 31, 1822
- Preceded by: Nathan Sanford
- Succeeded by: District abolished

Personal details
- Born: October 3, 1766 New York City, Province of New York
- Died: January 19, 1847 (aged 80) Rhinebeck, New York, U.S.
- Party: Democratic-Republican Bucktails; Whig
- Spouse: Joanna Livingston
- Relations: Maturin Livingston (brother); William Smith (grandfather); Robert R. Livingston (brother-in-law); Edward Livingston (brother-in-law)
- Parent(s): Robert James Livingston; Susanna Smith

Peter Robert Livingston (October 3, 1766 – January 19, 1847) was an American politician who served as the acting lieutenant governor of New York from February to October 1828.

== Early life ==
Peter Robert Livingston was born on October 3, 1766, in New York City. He was the son of Robert James Livingston (1725–1771) and Susanna (née Smith) Livingston (1729–1791), daughter of Chief Justice William Smith (1728–1793). His brothers were Col. William Smith Livingston (1755–1795) and Judge Maturin Livingston (1769–1847). They were among the many great-grandchildren of Robert Livingston the Younger (1663–1725), through their grandfather, James Livingston (1701–1763), Younger's eldest son.

== Career ==
Livingston practiced law. His nephew, Francis Armstrong Livingston (1795–1830), lived with him in Rhinebeck, where Francis had a law office, and until Francis' wedding to Emma Charlotte Kissam in 1817.

He was a member of the New York State Senate (Southern D.) from 1815 to 1822, sitting in the 39th, 40th, 41st, 42nd, 43rd, 44th and 45th New York State Legislatures. He succeeded Nathan Sanford in this seat.

In 1823, he was a member of the New York State Assembly for Dutchess County, and was elected Speaker as a Democratic-Republican/Bucktail, with 117 votes out of 123. He succeeded Samuel B. Romaine as Speaker and was succeeded by Richard Goodell.

From 1826 to 1829, he was again a member of the State Senate (2nd D.), sitting in the 49th, 50th, 51st and 52nd New York State Legislatures. He succeeded Stephen Thorn in this seat and was succeeded by Nathaniel P. Tallmadge.

In 1828, when Lieutenant Governor Nathaniel Pitcher succeeded to the governorship after the death of Gov. DeWitt Clinton, Livingston was elected President pro tempore of the State Senate and became Acting Lieutenant Governor of New York. He succeeded Pitcher as acting lieutenant governor and was succeeded by Charles Dayan.

He was a delegate to the Whig National Convention from New York in 1839 where he served as Convention Vice-president.

== Personal life ==
He married his cousin, Joanna Livingston (1759–1827), the ninth child of Judge Robert Livingston (1718–1775) and Margaret (née Beekman) Livingston (1724–1800). She was the sister of Chancellor Robert R. Livingston (1746–1813), a member of the Committee of Five that drafted the Declaration of Independence, and Edward Livingston (1764–1836), a U.S. Senator and the 11th U.S. Secretary of State. They had no children.

He was originally buried at the Dutch Reformed Church in Rhinebeck, but later reinterred at an unknown location.

Political offices
Preceded by Samuel B. Romaine	Speaker of the New York State Assembly; 1823	Succeeded by Richard Goodell
New York State Senate
Preceded by Nathan Sanford	New York State Senate; Southern District; 1815–1822	Succeeded by
Preceded by Stephen Thorn	New York State Senate; Second District (Class 3); 1826–1829	Succeeded by Nathaniel P. Tallmadge
Preceded by Nathaniel Pitcher	Lieutenant Governor of New York; Acting; 1828	Succeeded by Charles Dayan; Acting
