= John F. Bacon =

American diplomat

John F. Bacon (February 2, 1789 – February 25, 1860) was an American lawyer, diplomat and politician from New York.

Bacon was born in Great Barrington, Berkshire County, Massachusetts. He served as Clerk of the New York State Senate from January 1814 to January 1840.

In March 1840, he was appointed U.S. Consul at Nassau, Bahamas, then a British crown colony, and remained on the post until November 1841.

In 1844, he was Deputy New York State Treasurer.

In March 1846, he was again appointed U.S. Consul at Nassau, and remained in that post until 1850. In July 1853, he was re-appointed U.S. Consul at Nassau, and resigned the post in 1856.

Bacon died on February 25, 1860, in Nassau, Bahamas, aged 71.
