= George Tibbits =

American politician

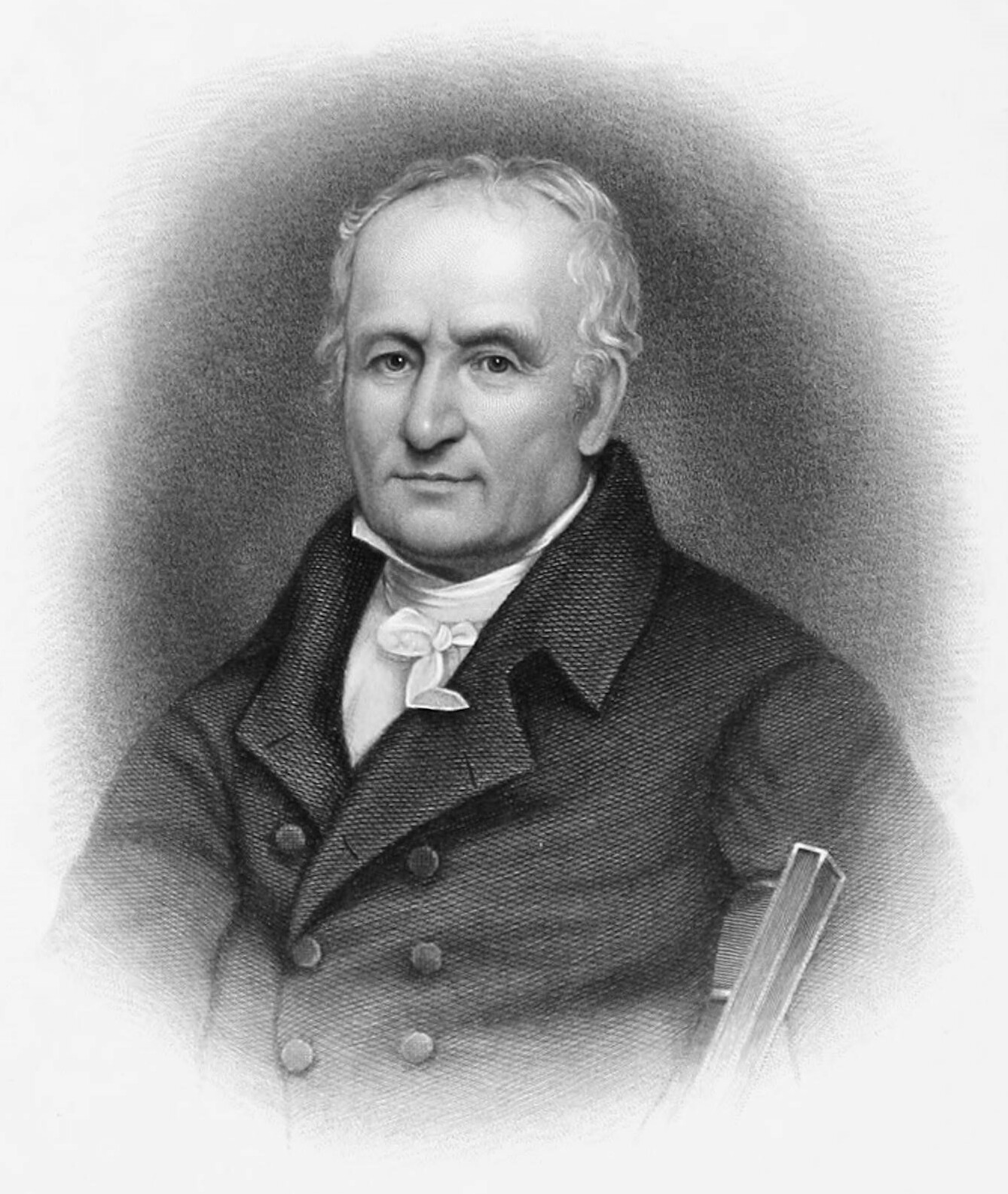

George Tibbits (January 14, 1763 – July 19, 1849) was an American politician and a member of the United States House of Representatives from New York.

== Life ==
He was born in Warwick, Rhode Island on January 14, 1763. He pursued classical studies and engaged in business in Lansingburgh, New York in 1784. He moved to Troy, New York in 1797 and became engaged in extensive mercantile pursuits.

Upon moving to Troy, he purchased a residence for himself and his family at the northeast corner of River and Congress Street. He also acquired the building across the street for the firm G. & B. Tibbits which he ran with his brother Benjamin until his death in 1802. In 1800 Tibbits purchased a large plot of land from the Hoosick Patent on the western edge of the Mount Ida neighborhood. Here he constructed a house and a two-story, five-bay wide neoclassical style house on or near the same site in 1808. His land extended along the northern portion of Congress Street.

He served as Troy's fire-warden in 1798, 1801, and 1808, and as a trustee of the village in 1800. He also served as chief engineer of the fire department in 1808. He was a member of the New York State Assembly in 1800.

George Tibbits was elected as a Federalist to the Eighth Congress, which met from March 4, 1803 to March 3, 1805. He was not a candidate for renomination in 1804. He served as a member of the New York State Senate from 1815 to 1818, and he was an unsuccessful Federalist candidate for Lieutenant Governor of New York in 1816.

He was an avid supporter of the construction of the Erie Canal. While a member of the state senate, he helped to plan a system for financing the construction of the Erie canal which was incorporated into the general law which was passed on April 15, 1817. He was also a member of the committee to oppose the relocation of the termination of the canal to be in Albany instead of in West Troy.

Tibbits was a prominent supporter of American agriculture and took part in the formation of the Rensselaer County Agricultural Society and was its first president in 1819.

He helped to develop his land and surrounding neighborhood around Congress Street into an urban landscape. He paid to have his land surveyed for the laying out of streets parallel to Eight Street. By 1827, land for the course of Seventh Street was set aside and Tibbits leased about 75 acres of the balance of his lands for agricultural purposes to Franklin Wright. In 1829-1830 Tibbits had a double house constructed, which still exists. In 1935, Tibbits had under construction five speculative row houses at that time at the corner of Congress and Seventh streets. He retained much of the land through the end of his life gradually constructing additional rental properties and tenements.

He was a member of the commission on state prisons, which rendered a favorable report on the Auburn Prison system in 1824. He was a member of the commission which had charge of the construction of Sing Sing Prison. He was the mayor of Troy, New York from 1830 to 1836. He died in Troy, New York in Rensselaer County on July 19, 1849. He was interred in Oakwood Cemetery. His eldest son George Mortimer Tibbits (1796–1878) built Tibbits House in 1860 on property owned by George Tibbits at Hoosick, New York. It was listed on the National Register of Historic Places in 1978.

U.S. House of Representatives
Preceded by Thomas Morris	Member of the U.S. House of Representatives from New York's 10th congressional district 1803–1805	Succeeded by Josiah Masters
