= William Ross (New York politician) =

American politician

William Ross (died September 5, 1830) was an American lawyer and politician.

== Life ==
He was the son of Robert Ross, a Scottish tanner who settled at Rossville, a hamlet in Newburgh, New York. William Ross studied law and gained admission to the bar in 1801, and practiced at Newburgh, New York. He married first Mary S. McLean (1787–1812), and then Caroline Middlebrook of Connecticut.

He was a member from Orange County of the New York State Assembly in 1808, 1809, and from 1811 to 1814. In February 1811, he was elected Speaker after the previously elected Speaker Nathan Sanford could not attend the session because of ill health.

From 1815 to 1822, he was a member of the New York State Senate from the Middle District, and was a member of the Council of Appointment in 1816 and 1819.

== Sources ==
- Political Graveyard
- Google Books The New York Civil List compiled by Franklin Benjamin Hough (pages 101, 145, 184 and 301; Weed, Parsons and Co., 1858)
- Pioneer Families of Orange County, New York by Bill Reamy (Heritage Books, 2007, ISBN 1-58549-601-4, ISBN 978-1-58549-601-3 ; page 135f)
- "BIG" LITTLE BRITAIN - The James Burnets by Margaret V. S. Wallace, from the Orange County Post on July 2, 1970, page 10

Political offices
Preceded by Nathan Sanford	Speaker of the New York State Assembly; 1811	Succeeded by Alexander Sheldon
