= Lucas Elmendorf =

American politician

Lucas Conrad Elmendorf (1758 – August 17, 1843) was a United States representative from New York.

== Biography ==
Born in Kingston, New York, he graduated from Princeton College in 1782, studied law, and was admitted to the bar in 1785 and practiced.

He was elected as a Democratic-Republican to the Fifth, Sixth, and Seventh Congresses, serving from March 4, 1797 to March 3, 1803. He declined to be a candidate for renomination in 1802 and was a member of the New York State Assembly in 1804 and 1805. He served in the New York Senate from 1814 to 1817 and was the first judge of the Court of Common Pleas (now county court) of Ulster County, serving from 1815 to 1821. He was surrogate of Ulster County from 1835 to 1840.

He died in Kingston in 1843; interment was in the crypt of the First Dutch Church.

== Personal life ==
He was the son of Jonathan (1723–1798) and Magdalena (Smedes) Elmendorf (1728 – before 1765). His family was one of the first to arrive to Wiltwyck, now Kingston, New York and helped settle many parts of Ulster County, New York. Through his mother, he is a descendant of Louis DuBois.

His 2nd great-niece, through his sister, Blandina Elmendorf Brodhead, was Cordelia Phythian, who married Joel R. P. Pringle.

U.S. House of Representatives
Preceded by John Hathorn	Member of the U.S. House of Representatives from New York's 4th congressional district 1797–1803	Succeeded by Philip Van Cortlandt
