= Farrand Stranahan =

American politician

Member of the New York State Senate
- In office 1814–1816
- In office 1823–1824

Personal details
- Born: 1778 Canaan, Columbia County, New York, U.S.
- Died: October 22, 1826 (aged 47–48) Cooperstown, Otsego County, New York, U.S.
- Party: Democratic-Republican, Federalist
- Spouse: Sarah Stewart
- Children: Farrand Stewart Stranahan
- Parent(s): John Stranahan, Lucy Buck
- Occupation: Lawyer, Politician

Farrand Stranahan (1778 in Canaan, Columbia County, New York – October 22, 1826 in Cooperstown, Otsego County, New York) was an American lawyer and politician from New York.

== Life ==
He was the son of John Stranahan and Lucy (Buck) Stranahan. In 1801, he relocated to Cooperstown and practiced law there. In 1803, he formed a partnership with Richard Fenimore Cooper, the oldest son of Judge William Cooper. Judge Cooper had founded the Village of Cooperstown and the Coopers remained the largest land-owners in the area. Stranahan thus was put in charge of the legal business deriving from the land holdings, like collecting debts and foreclosing mortgages. The partnership was dissolved in January 1807 over a political disagreement.

In 1807, the Democratic-Republican Party in New York was split into two factions: the "Lewisites" (supporters of the incumbent Governor Morgan Lewis); and the "Clintonians" (supporters of DeWitt Clinton). The Coopers were Federalists and had dominated local politics since the foundation of the village. The Federalists supported Lewis in his run for re-election against his Clintonian challenger Daniel D. Tompkins. Stranahan however was influenced by his landlord Elihu Phinney to support Tompkins.

During the election campaign, on April 3, 1807, on Phinney's instructions, the New York State Legislature incorporated Cooperstown as the "Village of Otsego", thus insulting Judge Cooper by "stealing" his village, but the incorporation act was not published in Cooperstown until after the election. Cooper campaigned vigorously for Lewis, but Tompkins was elected Governor, also carrying Otsego County. On May 14, the result of the election was published by Phinney in his Otsego Herald together with the incorporation act, calling for a meeting to elect the village trustees. On May 19, five friends of Judge Cooper were elected trustees. At this meeting Judge Cooper insulted the leading Democratic-Republicans, including Stranahan, who two days later avenged his honor by attacking Cooper in the street, severely beating him with his cane. Stranahan was arrested, tried and fined $30 for the assault. On May 23, the trustees met again and refused to take any further action until the village's original name was restored. This happened only in 1812 when the Federalists had the next time a majority in the State Legislature, and the "Village of Cooperstown" was re-incorporated.

Stranahan married Sarah Stewart (1768–1824, daughter of Gen. Charles Stewart (1729–1800)). Their only child was Farrand Stewart Stranahan (1812–1845), and the latter's son was Lt. Gov. of Vermont Farrand Stewart Stranahan (1842–1904).

During the War of 1812, Stranahan was a colonel and was taken prisoner during the Battle of Queenston Heights.

He was a member of the New York State Senate from 1814 to 1816 (Western D.), and from 1823 to 1824 (6th D.). He was a member of the Council of Appointment in 1815. He was a presidential elector in 1820 voting for James Monroe and Daniel D. Tompkins.

In 1824, Stranahan was one of the 17 State senators (a majority of the 32-seat State Senate) who voted against the election of presidential electors by popular ballot. This had been the main issue of the year, and the "People's Party", which advocated the popular election, achieved a landslide victory at the State election in November.

== Sources ==
- Who Murdered William Cooper? essay by Alan Taylor, published in New York History (Vol. LXXII, No. 3, July 1991; pp. 261–283)
- Genealogical and Family History of the State of Vermont by Hiram D. Carleton (page 306) [gives wrong birthplace "Cooperstown"]
- The New York Civil List compiled by Franklin Benjamin Hough (pages 101, 122, 125, 146, 321 and 326; Weed, Parsons and Co., 1858)
- Genealogies of the Stranahan, Josselyn, Fitch and Dow families in North America by Henry Reed Stiles (pages 19f)

New York State Senate
Preceded by new district	New York State Senate; Sixth District (Class 2); 1823 - 1824	Succeeded by Stukely Ellsworth
