= Moses I. Cantine =

American politician

Moses I. Cantine (January 18, 1774 - January 24, 1823) was an American politician, judge and newspaper editor from New York. A Democratic-Republican, he was most notable for his service as a member of the New York State Senate and First Judge of the Greene County Court.

== Biography ==
Cantine was born in Marbletown, Ulster County, New York on January 18, 1774, a son of Johannes and Maria (Brodhead) Cantine. He graduated from Princeton University in 1796, studied law, was admitted to the bar, and practiced in Greene County, New York.

A member of the Democratic-Republican Party, Cantine served as district attorney of the Third District (Columbia, Greene and Rensselaer counties) from 1805 to 1806, 1808 to 1810, and 1811 to 1818. He served in the New York State Senate from 1814 to 1818. He served as First Judge of the Greene County Court from 1818 to 1820.

A longtime member of the New York Militia, Cantine served as inspector of the 4th Brigade with the rank of major. During the War of 1812, he served on the northern frontier, the border area between New York and Canada. In 1818, he was appointed the militia's judge advocate general with the rank of lieutenant colonel.

On August 25, 1820, Cantine and Isaac Q. Leake took over the Albany Argus from Jesse Buel. In addition to publishing the newspaper, Cantine and Leake received appointment as the official state printers.

He died in Albany, New York on January 24, 1823. Contemporary news accounts indicate that Cantine died after drinking Crème de Noyaux. This liqueur contains trace amounts of hydrogen cyanide, and bottles left to age will sometimes have the poison concentrate near the top, posing a risk to the person who takes the first drink after the bottle is opened.

== Family ==
Cantine was married to Christina Hoes (1780-1823), the sister of Martin Van Buren's wife Hannah. They were the parents of two children, Moses Jr. and Christina.
