= Philetus Swift =

American politician

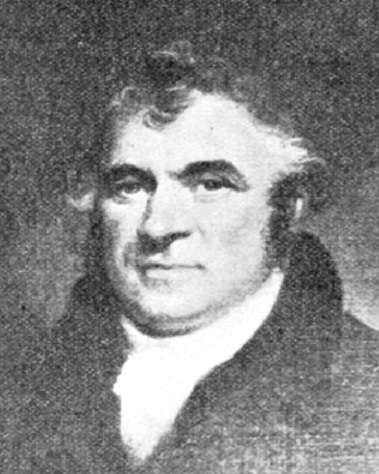
Swift, c. 1820

Philetus Swift (June 26, 1763 in Kent, Litchfield County, Connecticut – July 24, 1828 in Phelps, Ontario County, New York) was an American politician.

== Life ==
He was the son of Elisha Swift (born 1731) and Mary Ransom (born 1738). One of Swift's older brothers was future Brigadier General John Swift. On April 4, 1786, he married his first wife Electra Goodrich in Sharon, Connecticut. On May 22, 1793, he married his second wife Sally Deane (1774–1820?) in Phelps, New York, and their son was Deane Swift (1794–1818). On November 26, 1823, he married his third wife Fanny (or Fauna, Fawnia, Faunia) Cole (c. 1792–1880), and their daughter was Electra Jane Swift (1825–1904).

He was a member of the New York State Assembly from Genesee, Ontario and Allegany Counties in 1807 and 1808, and from Ontario County in 1823.

He fought in the War of 1812, and became a lieutenant colonel.

He was a member from the Western District of the New York State Senate from 1810 to 1815 and from 1816 to 1818. In February 1817, when John Tayler became Acting Governor of New York after the resignation of Daniel D. Tompkins, Swift was elected President pro tempore of the State Senate. He was Acting Lieutenant Governor of New York until July 1, 1817.

Swift was a presidential elector in 1820, voting for James Monroe and Daniel D. Tompkins.

Swift was originally buried at the Pioneer Cemetery at Phelps, N.Y. However, in the early 1900s, his granddaughter had his remains reinterred in the Webster Rural Cemetery in Webster, N.Y.

== Sources ==
- Political Graveyard
- The New York Civil List compiled by Franklin Benjamin Hough (pages 121ff, 180f, 199f; Weed, Parsons and Co., 1858)
- Cole genealogy
- Burial records in Ontario County
- Swift/Cole genealogy, at RootsWeb
- The Regents of the University of the State of New York: 1784-1959 compiled by Albert Bickmore Corey (University of the State of New York, 1959; page 31)
- Revolutionary War Soldiers Buried in Monroe County, New York—lists Swift's burial in Webster Rural Cemetery

Political offices
Preceded by John Tayler	Lieutenant Governor of New York; Acting; 1817	Succeeded by John Tayler
