= James Hall (New York assemblyman) =

American politician

New York State Assembly
- In office January 1, 1834 – December 31, 1834
- Preceded by: Alvin Plumb; Nathaniel Gray
- Succeeded by: Orrin McClure; John Woodward Jr.

Town of Carroll Supervisor
- In office 1826–1833
- Succeeded by: James Parker

Personal details
- Born: July 16, 1790 Dover, Vermont, US
- Died: August 21, 1846 (aged 56) Carroll, New York, US
- Party: Jacksonian
- Occupation: Politician

James Hall (July 16, 1790 – August 21, 1846) was an American politician. He was the first Supervisor of the Town of Carroll, New York (1826—1833; 1839). He served one term in the New York State Assembly (1834), representing Chautauqua County, New York.

== Biography ==
=== Early life and career ===
James Hall was born on July 16, 1790 in Dover, Vermont. He moved with his brothers to Chautauqua County, New York and settled in what was then the Town of Pomfret (present-day Kiantone, New York). In 1813, the Town of Ellicott was split off, and he held several officers in the town: Constable (1813), Collector (1813), Assessor (1816-1822), and Supervisor (1823-1825). He was one of the original purchasers of land in what became the Town of Carroll, New York from the Holland Land Company. He purchased lot 54 in July 1814 and lot 15 in October 1823.

The Town of Carroll was split from the Town of Ellicott, and he was elected its first Town Supervisor and served 9 years, from 1826 to 1833. He also served as a Justice of the Peace and as Commissioner of Schools in 1826 alongside Frewsburg, New York founder John Frew. Hall ran for New York State Assembly in 1828, but lost to Abner Hazeltine and Nathan Mixer. In 1829, he was elected Chair of the Board of Superisors of Chautauqua County. In 1833, he was elected, and served in the 57th New York State Legislature in 1834. He ran again in 1836 and 1839, but lost. He was re-elected Town of Carroll Supervisor, serving again in 1839.

Hall was also a Director of the Chautauqua County Bank in 1831.

=== Personal life and death ===
Hall married Mary Cheney, daughter of Ebenezer Cheney, in Dover 1810. Mary's sister Anna was the wife of Elial T. Foote. They had four children. Mary died the same year, and he married secondly to her sister, who died shortly afterward, and then thirdly to another sister. He joined the Congregational Church later in life. Hall died on August 21, 1846 at the age of 56.

== Electoral history ==
1828 New York State Assembly election
Party	Candidate	Votes	%
Jacksonian	John McAlister	1,158	17.12%
Anti-Masonic	Abner Hazeltine	2,056	30.40%
Anti-Masonic	Nathan Mixer	2,091	30.92%
Jacksonian	James White	1,458	21.56%
Jacksonian	James Hall	1,091	
Jacksonian	John Crain	936	

1833 New York State Assembly election
Party	Candidate	Votes	%
Democratic	James Hall		
Democratic	Thomas A. Osborne		
Anti-Masonic Party	Waterman Ellsworth		
Anti-Masonic Party	Austin Smith		

1836 New York State Assembly election
Party	Candidate	Votes	%
Anti-Masonic	Alvin Plumb		
Anti-Masonic	Calvin Rumsey		
Anti-Masonic	William Wilcox		
Democratic	Thomas Campbell		
Democratic	James Hall		
Democratic	Daniel Parsons		

1839 New York State Assembly election
Party	Candidate	Votes	%
	George A. French		
	Odin Benedict		
	William Rice		
Democratic	Thomas Campbell		
Democratic	James Hall		
Democratic	Jonathan Patterson		
