= Thomas B. Campbell =

American businessman, jurist, and politician

Thomas Burns Campbell
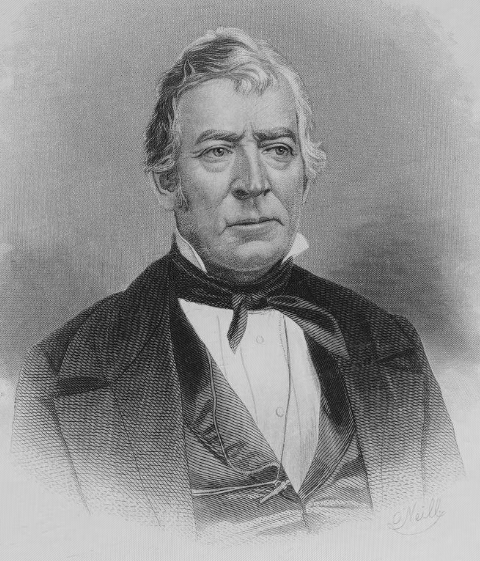

Member of the New York State Assembly
- In office July 1, 1821 – December 31, 1822
- Preceded by: William Hotchkiss; Jediah Prendergast
- Succeeded by: James Mullett Jr.
- In office January 1, 1836 – December 31, 1836
- Preceded by: Orrin McClure; John Woodward Jr.
- Succeeded by: Alvin Plumb; Calvin Rumsey; William Wilcox

4th Judge of Chautauqua County, New York
- In office 1845–1847
- Preceded by: Thomas A. Osborne
- Succeeded by: Abner Lewis

Personal details
- Born: May 19, 1788 Alexandria, New Hampshire, U.S.
- Died: March 3, 1885 (aged 96) Westfield, New York, U.S.
- Resting place: Westfield Cemetery; Westfield, New York, U.S.
- Party: Whig
- Occupation: Politician

Thomas Burns Campbell (May 19, 1788 – March 3, 1885) was an American businessman, jurist, and politician. He was a member of the New York State Assembly from 1821 to 1822 and again in 1836.

== Biography ==
=== Early life and career ===
Thomas Campbell was born on May 19, 1788, in Alexandria, Grafton County, New Hampshire. He lived in Batavia and then settled in the Town of Portland, New York in 1817, which later became part of the Town of Westfield. Here, he built a grist mill and was in the milling and flouring business for 47 years and also own hundreds of acres of farmland. He also kept a tavern in a log house. In 1836, he and others formed the Chautauque County Mutual Insurance Company.

=== Politics ===
Campbell was involved in both town and county politics. He was the Supervisor of the Town of Portland, New York from 1819 to 1827, and also served on the Chautauqua County Board of Supervisors, including Chair three terms (1820, 1823, and 1824). He was County Clerk from April 15, 1820, to February 1821. In 1826, he was appointed an associated judge of the county court and served in the position for 20 years. In 1842, he was Supervisor of the Town of Westfield, New York. Campbell was also the 4th Judge of Chautauqua County, New York from 1845 to 1847.

Campbell also served two terms in the New York State Assembly. He served in the 45th New York State Legislature from 1821 to 1822, alongside David Eason, until Isaac Phelps was declared the winner of the seat and seated during the term. Campbell served again in the 59th New York State Legislature in 1836 as a Whig, alongside Richard P. Marvin.

From 1830 to 1831, he was among the first Superintendents of the Poor and Keepers of the Poor House. By the 1840s, Campbell became a leading figure in efforts to restore the earlier mixed system that distinguished between town and county responsibility for the poor. In 1843, Campbell responded to concerns over rising taxes by addressing a public meeting and suggesting that the county's poorhouse system was becoming wasteful and unsustainable. His remarks sparked a heated public and press debate, leading to his election as Supervisor of Westfield and his introduction of resolutions in the Board of Supervisors to revert to the old system. Campbell's proposals were ultimately defeated, but his agitation contributed to greater scrutiny of poorhouse expenditures and reforms aimed at increasing efficiency and economy in poor relief operations.

=== Freemasonry ===
In 1826, when the masonic order in Chautauqua County was shuttered, Campbell along with Elial Foote and Sylvanus Henderson preserved their scattered records. Campbell, along with Abijah Clark, were leaders of the Councils of Royal and Select Masters and Commanders of the Knights Templar, as part of the Ancient York Rite of freemasons. He was a member of Summit Lodge No. 219.

=== Personal life and death ===
Campbell had a daughter, Harriet, who was married to D.H. Taylor. In 1860, he sold sixty several acres of land for fairgrounds.

Campbell died on March 3, 1885, in Westfield at the age of 96. His funeral was conducted by the freemasons and "an unusally [sic?] large number attending." He was buried in Westfield Cemetery.
