= 46th New York State Legislature =

New York state legislative session

←	45th	47th	→
- The Old State Capitol (1879)

Overview
- Legislative body: New York State Legislature
- Jurisdiction: New York, United States
- Term: January 1 – December 31, 1823

Senate
- Members: 32
- President: Lt. Gov. Erastus Root (Buckt.)
- Party control: Dem.-Rep. (unan.)

Assembly
- Members: 128
- Speaker: Peter R. Livingston (Buckt.)
- Party control: Bucktail

Sessions
- 1st: January 7 – April 24, 1823

The 46th New York State Legislature, consisting of the New York State Senate and the New York State Assembly, met from January 7 to April 24, 1823, during the first year of Joseph C. Yates's governorship, in Albany.

== Background ==
A Constitutional Convention met from August 28 to November 10, 1821, and the new Constitution was adopted by the voters in January 1822. Under the provisions of the New York Constitution of 1821, 32 Senators were elected on general tickets in eight senatorial districts for four-year terms. They were divided into four classes, and every year eight Senate seats came up for election. Assemblymen were elected countywide on general tickets to a one-year term, the whole Assembly being renewed annually.

The new Constitution legislated Gov. DeWitt Clinton and Lt. Gov. John Tayler out of office at the end of 1822. Besides, the Council of Appointment was abolished, and the State officers were to be elected by the State Legislature.

On April 12, 1822, the Legislature re-apportioned the Assembly districts. All previously existing multiple-county districts (except Hamilton and Montgomery) were dismembered, and every county became a district. The total number of assemblymen was increased from 126 to 128.

On April 17, 1822, the Legislature enacted that future State elections be held on the first Monday in November and the two succeeding days.

At this time New York politics were dominated by the Bucktails faction of the Democratic-Republican Party. The opposing Democratic-Republican faction, the "Clintonians" disappeared after DeWitt Clinton decided not to run in the New York gubernatorial election, 1822; and the Federalist Party had virtually disbanded. Nevertheless, in some districts Clintonian or Federalist Senate and Assembly tickets were put up in opposition to the Bucktails (which were considered the "regular" Democratic-Republican nominees), but without much success.

The Bucktails nominated Supreme Court Justice Joseph C. Yates for Governor, and Erastus Root for Lieutenant Governor. The Clintonians made no nomination for Governor, but nominated Henry Huntington for Lieutenant Governor. Solomon Southwick nominated himself for Governor.

== Elections ==
The State election was held from November 4 to 6, 1822. Joseph C. Yates and Erastus Root were elected. All 32 State senators were elected on the regular Democratic-Republican tickets.

== Sessions ==
The Legislature met at the Old State Capitol in Albany on January 7, 1823, and adjourned on April 24.

Peter R. Livingston (Buckt.) was elected Speaker with 117 votes out of 123.

On January 27, the Senate rejected the re-appointment of Chief Justice Ambrose Spencer and Associate Supreme Court Justices Jonas Platt and John Woodworth; and confirmed the appointment of Nathan Sanford as Chancellor to succeed James Kent.

On January 28, Gov. Yates nominated State Comptroller John Savage as Chief Justice; and Jacob Sutherland and Samuel Betts as associate justices.

On January 29, Savage and Sutherland were confirmed, but the appointment of Betts was rejected. Thereupon Gov. Yates re-nominated Woodworth who was confirmed after some debate by a slim margin.

On February 13, the Legislature elected Secretary of State John Van Ness Yates, Attorney General Samuel A. Talcott and Surveyor General Simeon De Witt to succeed themselves; and William L. Marcy to succeed Savage as State Comptroller.

On March 31, the Legislature appointed Edwin Croswell and Isaac Q. Leake as State Printers.

On April 17, the Legislature enacted that there shall be eight New York State Circuit Courts, one in each senatorial district. Gov. Yates nominated as judges: Ogden Edwards (1st D.); Samuel Betts (2nd D.); William A. Duer (3rd D.); Reuben H. Walworth (4th D.); Nathan Williams (5th D.); Samuel Nelson (6th D.); Enos T. Throop (7th D.) and William B. Rochester (8th D.). They were confirmed on April 21.

== State Senate ==
=== Districts ===
- The First District (4 seats) consisted of Kings, New York, Queens, Richmond and Suffolk counties.
- The Second District (4 seats) consisted of Dutchess, Orange, Putnam, Rockland, Sullivan, Ulster and Westchester counties.
- The Third District (4 seats) consisted of Albany, Columbia, Greene, Rensselaer, Schenectady and Schoharie counties.
- The Fourth District (4 seats) consisted of Clinton, Essex, Franklin, Hamilton, Montgomery, St. Lawrence, Saratoga, Warren and Washington counties.
- The Fifth District (4 seats) consisted of Herkimer, Jefferson, Lewis, Madison, Oneida and Oswego counties.
- The Sixth District (4 seats) consisted of Broome, Chenango, Cortland, Delaware, Otsego, Tioga and Tompkins counties.
- The Seventh District (4 seats) consisted of Cayuga, Onondaga, Ontario and Seneca counties.
- The Eighth District (4 seats) consisted of Allegany, Cattaraugus, Chautauqua, Erie, Genesee, Livingston, Monroe, Niagara and Steuben counties.
Note: There are now 62 counties in the State of New York. The counties which are not mentioned in this list had not yet been established, or sufficiently organized, the area being included in one or more of the abovementioned counties.

=== Members ===
The asterisk (*) denotes members of the previous Legislature who continued in office as members of this Legislature. James Burt and Byram Green changed from the Assembly to the Senate.

Under the provisions of the new Constitution, upon taking office the senators were classified by drawing lots to terms of one, two, three or four years, as shown in the table below.

District	Senators	Term left	Party	Notes
First	John A. King	1 year	Dem.-Rep.	
First	Walter Bowne*	2 years	Dem.-Rep.	
First	John Lefferts*	3 years	Dem.-Rep.	
First	Jasper Ward	4 years	Dem.-Rep.	
Second	John Hunter	1 year	Dem.-Rep.	
Second	John Sudam	2 years	Dem.-Rep.	
Second	Stephen Thorn	3 years	Dem.-Rep.	
Second	James Burt*	4 year	Dem.-Rep.	
Third	Edward P. Livingston	1 year	Dem.-Rep.	
Third	vacant	2 years		Jacob Sutherland did not take his seat
Third	Charles E. Dudley*	3 years	Dem.-Rep.	also Mayor of Albany
Third	James Mallory	4 years	Dem.-Rep.	
Fourth	David Erwin	1 year	Dem.-Rep.	
Fourth	Melancton Wheeler	2 years	Dem.-Rep.	
Fourth	John Cramer	3 years	Dem.-Rep.	
Fourth	Archibald McIntyre*	4 years	Dem.-Rep.	
Fifth	Samuel Beardsley	1 year	Dem.-Rep.	in March 1823, appointed U.S. Atty. for the Northern D. of NY, and resigned his seat at the end of the session in April
Fifth	Alvin Bronson	2 years	Dem.-Rep.	
Fifth	Thomas Greenly	3 years	Dem.-Rep.	
Fifth	Sherman Wooster	4 years	Dem.-Rep.	
Sixth	Samuel G. Hathaway	1 year	Dem.-Rep.	
Sixth	Farrand Stranahan	2 years	Dem.-Rep.	
Sixth	Tilly Lynde*	3 years	Dem.-Rep.	
Sixth	Isaac Ogden	4 years	Dem.-Rep.	
Seventh	Silas Bowker	1 year	Dem.-Rep.	
Seventh	Byram Green*	2 years	Dem.-Rep.	
Seventh	Jesse Clark	3 years	Dem.-Rep.	
Seventh	Jonas Earll, Jr.	4 years	Dem.-Rep.	
Eighth	Timothy H. Porter	1 year	Dem.-Rep.	
Eighth	David Eason	2 years	Dem.-Rep.	
Eighth	Heman J. Redfield	3 years	Dem.-Rep.	also D.A. of Genesee Co.
Eighth	Joseph Spencer	4 years	Dem.-Rep.	died May 2, 1823

=== Employees ===
- Clerk: John F. Bacon

== State Assembly ==
=== Districts ===
- Albany County (3 seats)
- Allegany County (1 seat)
- Broome County (1 seat)
- Cattaraugus County (1 seat)
- Cayuga County (4 seats)
- Chautauqua County (1 seat)
- Chenango County (3 seats)
- Clinton County (1 seat)
- Columbia County (3 seats)
- Cortland County (2 seats)
- Delaware County (2 seats)
- Dutchess County (4 seats)
- Erie County (1 seat)
- Essex County (1 seat)
- Franklin County (1 seat)
- Genesee County (4 seats)
- Greene County (2 seats)
- Hamilton and Montgomery co. (4 seats)
- Herkimer County (3 seats)
- Jefferson County (3 seats)
- Kings County (1 seat)
- Lewis County (1 seat)
- Livingston County (2 seats)
- Madison County (3 seats)
- Monroe County (3 seats)
- The City and County of New York (10 seats)
- Niagara County (1 seat)
- Oneida County (5 seats)
- Onondaga County (4 seats)
- Ontario County (6 seats)
- Orange County (4 seats)
- Oswego County (1 seat)
- Otsego County (4 seats)
- Putnam County (1 seat)
- Queens County (2 seats)
- Rensselaer County (4 seats)
- Richmond County (1 seat)
- Rockland County (1 seat)
- St. Lawrence County (1 seat)
- Saratoga County (3 seats)
- Schenectady County (1 seat)
- Schoharie County (2 seats)
- Seneca County (2 seats)
- Steuben County (2 seats)
- Suffolk County (2 seats)
- Sullivan County (1 seat)
- Tioga County (2 seats)
- Tompkins County (2 seats)
- Ulster County (3 seats)
- Warren County (1 seat)
- Washington (4 seats)
- Westchester County (3 seats)
Note: There are now 62 counties in the State of New York. The counties which are not mentioned in this list had not yet been established, or sufficiently organized, the area being included in one or more of the abovementioned counties.

=== Assemblymen ===
The asterisk (*) denotes members of the previous Legislature who continued as members of this Legislature. Peter R. Livingston changed from the Senate to the Assembly.

District	Assemblymen	Party	Notes
Albany	Abraham Brooks		
Albany	Jesse Buel	Dem.-Rep./Bucktail	
Albany	Abraham Rosecrantz		
Allegany	James McCall	Dem.-Rep./Bucktail	
Broome	Jonathan Lewis		
Cattaraugus	Stephen Crosby		
Cayuga	Josiah Bevier		
Cayuga	Elijah Drake		
Cayuga	John Jakway		
Cayuga	John O'Hara		
Chautauqua	James Mullett Jr.	Dem.-Rep./Bucktail	
Chenango	Silas Holmes		
Chenango	Austin Hyde		
Chenango	Stephen Stillwell		
Clinton	Azariah C. Flagg	Dem.-Rep./Bucktail	
Columbia	Abraham P. Holdridge	Clintonian	
Columbia	Stephen Storm		
Columbia	John Van Deusen		
Cortland	John Gillet		
Cortland	Daniel Sherwood*		
Delaware	Asa Grant*		
Delaware	Samuel Rexford		
Dutchess	Wheeler Gilbert		
Dutchess	Prince Hoag		
Dutchess	Peter R. Livingston*	Dem.-Rep./Bucktail	elected Speaker
Dutchess	Samuel M. Thurston		
Erie	Ebenezer F. Norton	Dem.-Rep./Bucktail	
Essex	Asa Adgate		
Franklin	William Hogan		
Genesee	Apollos P. Auger		
Genesee	William Bristol		
Genesee	Josiah Churchill		
Genesee	Otis Turner		
Greene	Reuben Hosford	Dem.-Rep./Bucktail	
Greene	Williams Seaman	Dem.-Rep./Bucktail	
Hamilton and Montgomery	George D. Ferguson		
Hamilton and Montgomery	Alvin Harris		
Hamilton and Montgomery	Christian Klock		
Hamilton and Montgomery	Joseph Spier		
Herkimer	Abijah Beckwith	Dem.-Rep.	
Herkimer	John Dygert		
Herkimer	Henry Tillinghast		
Jefferson	Walter Cole		
Jefferson	Richard Goodell	Dem.-Rep./Bucktail	
Jefferson	Converse Johnson		
Kings	William Conselyea Jr.	Dem.-Rep./Bucktail	
Lewis	Abner W. Spencer		
Livingston	William Janes		
Livingston	Matthew Warner		previously a member from Ontario Co.
Madison	Rutherford Barker		
Madison	Daniel M. Gillet		
Madison	Curtis Hoppin		
Monroe	John Bowman	Dem.-Rep./Bucktail	
Monroe	Samuel B. Bradley	Clintonian	
Monroe	Simon Stone 2d	Clintonian	
New York	Philip Brasher*		
New York	John L. Broome		
New York	Samuel S. Gardiner		
New York	Jesse Hoyt	Dem.-Rep./Bucktail	
New York	Thomas Hyatt		
New York	Gideon Lee		
New York	John Morss*	Dem.-Rep./Bucktail	
New York	John Rathbone Jr.		
New York	William A. Thompson		
New York	Gulian C. Verplanck*	Dem.-Rep./Bucktail	
Niagara	Benjamin Barlow Jr.	Clintonian	
Oneida	Uri Doolittle	Dem.-Rep.	
Oneida	Thomas H. Hamilton		
Oneida	James Lynch	Dem.-Rep./Bucktail	
Oneida	Henry Wager	Dem.-Rep./Bucktail	
Oneida	Samuel Wetmore		
Onondaga	Timothy Barber		
Onondaga	Victory Birdseye	Dem.-Rep./Bucktail	also D.A. of Onondaga Co.
Onondaga	Samuel L. Edwards	Dem.-Rep./Bucktail	
Onondaga	Harold White		
Ontario	Birdseye Brooks*		
Ontario	Richard Hogarth		
Ontario	Jacob Leach		
Ontario	Aaron Remer*		
Ontario	Ira Selby		
Ontario	Philetus Swift	Dem.-Rep./Bucktail	
Orange	David Christie		
Orange	William Finn		
Orange	Isaac Van Duzer		
Orange	Samuel Webb		
Oswego	Theophilus S. Morgan		
Otsego	William Hall		
Otsego	Isaac Hayes	Dem.-Rep.	
Otsego	Samuel M. Ingalls		
Otsego	William Utter		
Putnam	William Watts		
Queens	John D. Hicks	Dem.-Rep./Bucktail	
Queens	Benjamin T. Kissam	Dem.-Rep./Bucktail	
Rensselaer	Joseph Case (assemblyman)		
Rensselaer	Gilbert Eddy	Dem.-Rep./Bucktail	
Rensselaer	Chester Griswold		
Rensselaer	Stephen Warren		
Richmond	Isaac R. Housman		
Rockland	John I. Suffern		
St. Lawrence	Nathaniel F. Winslow		
Saratoga	Samuel Belding		
Saratoga	Valentine Campbell		
Saratoga	John Pettit		
Schenectady	Peter H. Brooks		
Schoharie	William Dietz		
Schoharie	Peter W. Snyder		
Seneca	Jonas Seely		
Seneca	Ananias Wells	Dem.-Rep./Bucktail	
Steuben	George McClure		
Steuben	William Woods	Dem.-Rep.	in November 1823, elected to the 18th U.S. Congress
Suffolk	Joshua Fleet		
Suffolk	Samuel Strong		
Sullivan	John Lindsley		
Tioga	Matthew Carpenter		
Tioga	Benjamin Jennings		
Tompkins	Jacob Conrad		
Tompkins	Peter Hager 2d*	Dem.-Rep./Bucktail	
Ulster	John Jansen	Dem.-Rep./Bucktail	
Ulster	Wells Lake	Dem.-Rep./Bucktail	
Ulster	Solomon Shaler	Dem.-Rep./Bucktail	
Warren	William McDonald*		
Washington	Timothy Eddy		
Washington	John King		
Washington	Martin Lee		
Washington	James McNaughten		
Westchester	Nehemiah Brown Jr.		
Westchester	St. John Constant		
Westchester	Thomas Smith*	Dem.-Rep./Bucktail	

=== Employees ===
- Clerk: Edward Livingston
- Sergeant-at-Arms: Henry Fryer
- Doorkeeper: James Myers
- Assistant Doorkeeper: Richard Ten Broeck

== Sources ==
- The New York Civil List compiled by Franklin Benjamin Hough (Weed, Parsons and Co., 1858) [see pg. 109 for Senate districts; pg. 125 for senators; pg. 148f for Assembly districts; pg. 199f for assemblymen]
- The History of Political Parties in the State of New-York, from the Ratification of the Federal Constitution to 1840 by Jabez D. Hammond (4th ed., Vol. 2, Phinney & Co., Buffalo, 1850; pg. 98 to 124)
- Election result Assembly, Clinton Co. at project "A New Nation Votes", compiled by Phil Lampi, hosted by Tufts University Digital Library
- Election result Assembly, Delaware Co. at project "A New Nation Votes"
- Election result Assembly, Greene Co. at project "A New Nation Votes"
- Election result Assembly, Kings Co. at project "A New Nation Votes"
- Election result Assembly, Monroe Co. at project "A New Nation Votes"
- Election result Assembly, Niagara Co. at project "A New Nation Votes"
- Election result Assembly, Richmond Co. at project "A New Nation Votes"
- Election result Assembly, Seneca Co. at project "A New Nation Votes"
- Election result Assembly, Suffolk Co. at project "A New Nation Votes"
- Election result Assembly, Tioga Co. at project "A New Nation Votes"
- Election result Assembly, Ulster Co. at project "A New Nation Votes"
- Partial election result Senate, First D. at project "A New Nation Votes" [gives only votes of Kings, Richmond and Suffolk Co.]
- Partial election result Senate, Second D. at project "A New Nation Votes" [gives only votes of Ulster Co.]
- Partial election result Senate, Third D. at project "A New Nation Votes" [gives only votes of Greene Co.]
- Partial election result Senate, Fourth D. at project "A New Nation Votes" [gives only votes from Clinton Co.]
- Partial election result Senate, Sixth D. at project "A New Nation Votes" [gives only votes of Tioga Co.]
- Partial election result Senate, Seventh D. at project "A New Nation Votes" [gives only votes of Seneca Co.]
- Partial election result Senate, Eighth D. at project "A New Nation Votes" [gives only votes from Monroe and Niagara Co.]
