= Abner Lewis =

American politician

Member of the New York State Assembly for Chautauqua County
- In office 1838–1839
- Preceded by: Alvin Plumb; Calvin Rumsey; William Wilcox
- Succeeded by: Odin Benedict; George A. French; William Rice

Member of the U.S. House of Representatives from New York's 31st district
- In office March 4, 1845 – March 3, 1847
- Preceded by: Asher Tyler
- Succeeded by: Dudley Marvin

5th Judge of Chautauqua County, New York
- In office 1847–1852
- Preceded by: Thomas B. Campbell

Personal details
- Born: August 17, 1801 Wells, Vermont, U.S.
- Died: October 12, 1879 (aged 78) Winona, Minnesota, U.S.
- Resting place: Woodlawn Cemetery, Winona, Minnesota, U.S.
- Party: Whig; Prohibition

Abner Lewis (August 17, 1801 – October 12, 1879) was a U.S. representative, judge and attorney from Jamestown, New York and Winona, Minnesota.

== Biography ==
Lewis was born in Wells, Vermont on August 17, 1801. He was raised in Chautauqua County, New York, studied law with Abner Hazeltine in Jamestown, was admitted to the bar, and commenced practice in Panama.

He was a member of the New York State Assembly, serving in the 61st and 62nd New York State Legislatures from 1838 to 1839, in which he represented Chautauqua County. He served alongside Thomas I. Allen and George A. French.

Lewis was elected as a Whig to the 29th United States Congress, holding office from March 4, 1845, to March 3, 1847. He did not run for reelection, and served as Chautauqua County Judge from June 1847 to November 1852.

In 1856 Lewis moved to Winona, Minnesota, where he practiced law and was active in several businesses, including the city's transit railroad. Lewis was also involved in several civic causes, including construction of the State Normal School, Minnesota's academy for training teachers.

During the American Civil War Lewis was a Voting Commissioner, responsible for enabling Union soldiers from western states to cast ballots while in the field. In 1867 he was appointed U.S. Internal Revenue Assessor for the district that included Winona.

Active in the Methodist church as a lay preacher, and a prominent member of the prohibition movement, in 1870 he was the Prohibition Party's nominee for governor.

Lewis was also interested in higher education, including serving as a Trustee of Hamline University and the State Normal School (now Winona State University), Minnesota's academy for training schoolteachers.

He remained active until his health began to fail in the late 1870s, after which he lived in retirement in Winona.

Lewis died in Winona on October 12, 1879. He was interred in Winona's Woodlawn Cemetery.

== Sources ==
- United States Congress. "Abner Lewis (id: L000270)". Biographical Directory of the United States Congress.
- Minnesota Legal History Project, Biography, Abner Lewis, 2012

U.S. House of Representatives
Preceded by Asher Tyler	Member of the U.S. House of Representatives from New York's 31st congressional district 1845–1847	Succeeded by Dudley Marvin
