= Thomas A. Osborne =

American politician (1800–1877)

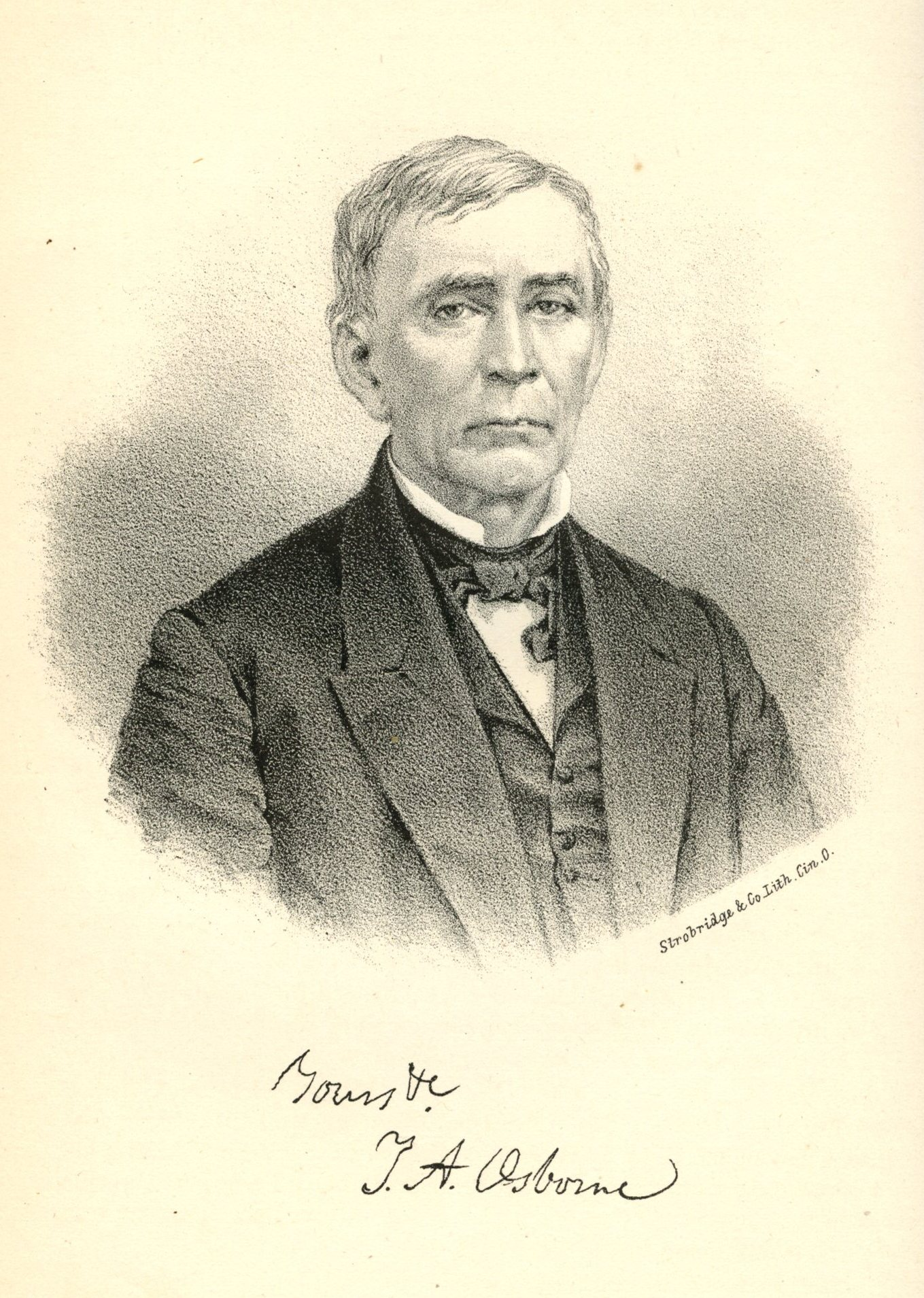

New York State Assembly
- In office January 1, 1834 – December 31, 1834
- Preceded by: Nathaniel Gray; Alvin Plumb
- Succeeded by: Orrin McClure; John Woodward Jr.

3rd Judge of Chautauqua County, New York
- In office 1843–1845
- Preceded by: Elial T. Foote
- Succeeded by: Thomas B. Campbell

Personal details
- Born: July 1, 1800 Hoosick Falls, New York
- Died: April 27, 1877 (aged 76)
- Party: Jacksonian/Democrat
- Occupation: Politician

Thomas Albert Osborne (July 1, 1800 – April 27, 1877) was an American attorney, jurist, politician and newspaper owner and editor. He served one term in the New York State Assembly (1834) alongside James Hall and was the 3rd Judge of Chautauqua County, New York (1843–1845).

== Biography ==
=== Early life and career ===
Osborne was born on July 1, 1800, in Hoosick Falls, New York. In 1821, he moved from Troy to Fredonia in Chautauqua County, New York. In May 1822, he moved to Mayville. He was the original purchaser of two lots in the Town of Pomfret from the Holland Land Company. In June 1822, he purchased lot 35 and in February 1824, he purchased lot 29. He practiced law, entering a partnership with Jacob Houghton, working in Fredonia and Mayville. He later was a partner with John Birdsall and George A. Green.

In 1825, the Marquis de Lafayette visited Chautauqua County and made a stop in Westfield. Osborne was appointed to an arrangements committee to welcome Lafayette, and gave the address upon his arrival on behalf of the committee.

In 1834, Osborne, along with William Smith and Samuel S. Whallon, established the Mayville Sentinel newspaper. The next year, it was sold to Beman Brockway. Osborne continued to serve as editor until 1836, when the land office was destroyed. In 1849, he purchased an interest in the Frontier Express of Fredonia for his son, and served as editor before he sold his part to E.F. Foster. The newspaper was changed to the Chautauqua Union.

Osborne was married three times; first to Mary Walters, with whom he had two children, Gustavus and Mary; second to Eliza J. Huston; and third to Mary Derby, with whom he had a son, Albert.

=== Politics ===
In 1827, he ran for New York State Assembly as a Bucktail alongside James Mullett Jr. Both lost to the Anti-Masonic Party candidates Nathaniel Fenton and Nathan Mixer. He served as clerk of the Chautauqua County Board of Supervisors from 1827 to 1830.

In 1833, he ran again along with James Hall as the Democratic Party's candidates. They won and went on to serve in the 57th New York State Legislature in 1834. He served as First Judge of the Court of Common Please from 1843 to 1845, having succeeded Elial T. Foote. In the 1850s, during the administration of Franklin Pierce, Osborne was Deputy Collector of the Port of New York under Heman J. Redfield and Greene C. Bronson.

=== Later life and death ===
Osborne died on April 27, 1877, at the age of 76. He was buried in Mayville Cemetery in Mayville, New York.

== Electoral history ==
Chautauqua County, New York

1827 New York State Assembly election
| Party | Candidate | Votes | % |
|---|---|---|---|
| Anti-Masonic | Nathaniel Fenton | 2,192 | 31.97% |
| Anti-Masonic | Nathan Mixer | 2,332 | 24.01% |
| Bucktail | James Mullett Jr. | 1,232 | 17.96% |
| Bucktail | Thomas A. Osborne | 1,101 | 16.06% |

57th New York State Legislature

1833 New York State Assembly election
| Party | Candidate | Votes | % |
|---|---|---|---|
| Democratic | James Hall elected | | |
| Democratic | Thomas A. Osborne elected | | |
| Anti-Masonic Party | Waterman Ellsworth | | |
| Anti-Masonic Party | Austin Smith | | |
