= McClurg =

McClurg is a surname. Notable people with the surname include:

- Alexander C. McClurg, American general and publisher
- Andrew McClurg, American legal scholar
- Edie McClurg (born 1945), American actor
- James McClurg (1746–1823), Virginia physician and politician
- Joseph W. McClurg (1818–1900), American politician
- Virginia Donaghe McClurg (1857–1931), Regent-General of National Colorado Cliff Dwellings Association

== See also ==
- A. C. McClurg, an American publishing company
- McClurg, Missouri, an unincorporated community in the United States
- McClurg Museum, a museum in New York, United States
