= Nathaniel Fenton =

American soldier and politician

Member of the New York State Assembly representing Otsego County, New York
- In office July 1, 1814 – June 30, 1815
- Preceded by: Erastus Crafts; Abel DeForest; Samuel Griffin; James Hyde
- Succeeded by: William Campbell; Silas Crippen; Isaac Hayes; Oliver Judd

Member of the New York State Assembly representing Chautauqua County, New York
- In office January 1, 1828 – December 31, 1828
- Preceded by: Samuel A. Brown; Elial T. Foote
- Succeeded by: Abner Hazeltine

Personal details
- Born: March 26, 1763 Mansfield, Connecticut
- Died: January 25, 1846 (aged 82) Ellicott, New York
- Occupation: Politician

Nathaniel Fenton (March 26, 1763—January 25, 1846) was an American soldier and politician. He served two terms in the New York State Assembly (1814—1815; 1828) and was the first Supervisor of the Town of Poland, New York.

== Biography ==
Fenton was born on March 26, 1763, in Mansfield, Connecticut, a son of Ebenezer and Lydia (Conant) Fenton. He was the first out of eight children by his father's second marriage, and he had seven older half siblings. During the American Revolution, he was a colonial scout and later made his way up to the rank of Colonel. In 1781, he served in the Continental Army, serving in New York before returning home. He reenlisted in April 1782 and served in both Connecticut and New York. He enlisted a third time, and was at West Point when the army disbanded.

Fenton moved to Otsego County, New York in November 1791, settling in Burlington. In 1802, he became a member of the Congregational Church. Fenton was elected to the New York State Assembly in the 38th New York State Legislature as one of the four representatives for the county from 1814 to 1815 as a member of the Democratic-Republican Party. In 1815, Fenton was the Supervisor of the Town of Burlington, New York.

Fenton again served in the New York State Assembly in the 41st New York State Legislature, representing Otsego County from 1817 to 1818. Fenton served as a Surrogate judge in Otsego County, from his appointment on June 17, 1818, until the court was abolished in 1823.

Fenton moved to Chautauqua County, New York in September 1823 and settled in the Town of Ellicott. He served in the New York State Assembly in 1828, representing Chautauqua County in the 51st New York State Legislature alongside Nathan Mixer. Both were members of the Anti-Masonic Party. The Town of Poland was split from Ellicott in 1833, and Fenton became its first Supervisor on March 5, 1833. He was also the Supervisor for the Town of Ellicott (1828-1829; 1831–1840).

Fenton married Rachel Fletcher in 1790 and they were the parents of Orilla, Richard, and another Richard. Fenton died on January 25, 1846, in Ellicott, New York.

== Electoral history ==
1827 New York State Assembly election
Party	Candidate	Votes	%
Bucktail	James Mullett Jr.	1,232	17.96%
Anti-Masonic	Nathaniel Fenton	2,192	31.97%
Anti-Masonic	Nathan Mixer	2,332	24.01%
Bucktail	Thomas A. Osborne	1,101	16.06%
