= Samuel A. Brown =

American politician (1795–1863)

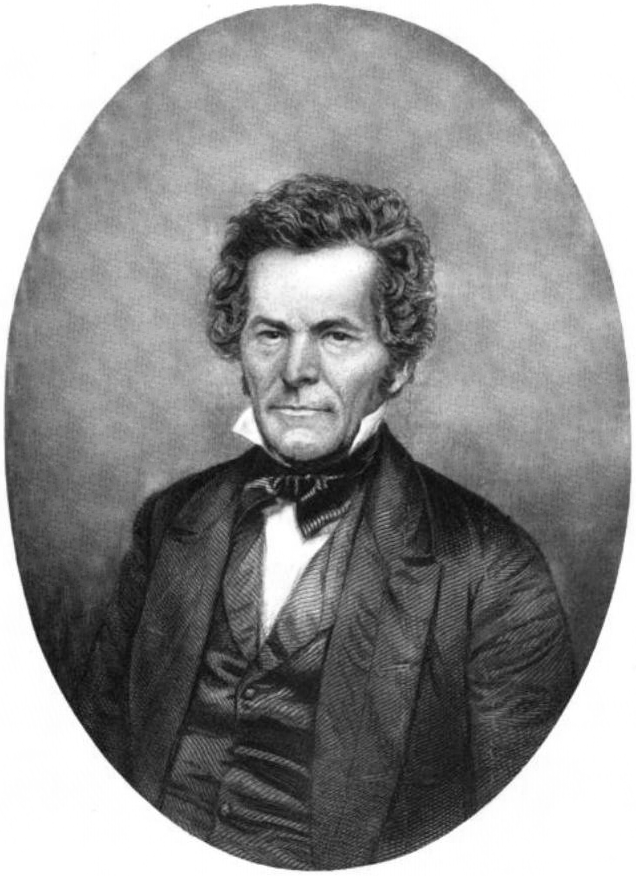

New York State Assembly representing Chautauqua County
- In office January 1, 1827 – December 31, 1827
- Preceded by: Elial T. Foote
- Succeeded by: Nathaniel Fenton; Nathan Mixer

New York State Assembly representing Chautauqua County
- In office January 1, 1845 – December 31, 1845
- Preceded by: Forbes Johnson; Marcius Simons; Elijah Waters
- Succeeded by: Madison Burnell; Valorus Lake; Elisha Ward

Personal details
- Born: Samuel Augustus Brown; February 20, 1795 Hebron, Connecticut, U.S.
- Died: June 7, 1863 (aged 68) Jamestown, New York, U.S.
- Occupation: Politician

Samuel Augustus Brown (February 20, 1795―June 7, 1863) was an American attorney and politician. He served two terms in the New York State Assembly (1827, 1845).

== Biography ==
Brown was born on February 20, 1795, in Hebron, Connecticut, a son of Col. Daniel and Anna (Phelps) Brown. He received a common school education, learned the Latin language and surveying, and also studied law for three years in the office of his brother Henry Brown in Springfield, New York. He was an early settler of Chautauqua County, New York. He first settled in Jamestown in 1816, arriving on horseback, and purchased land in the Town of Ellicott in 1818. He was admitted to practice law in 1816 and to the supreme court in 1818. Brown also served as District Attorney of Chautauqua County, was an agent with the Cherry Valley Land Company, was a director and attorney of the Chautauqua County Bank, and was involved in the formation of the Jamestown Academy.

Brown served twice in as a member of the New York State Assembly. In 1826, he was elected to the 50th New York State Legislature and served from January 1, 1827, to December 31, 1827, alongside Elial T. Foote. In 1844, he was elected to the 68th New York State Legislature as a member of the Whig Party and served from January 1, 1845, to December 31, 1845, alongside Henry C. Frisbee and Jeremiah Mann.

Brown was also a member of the Congregational Church of Jamestown and was among its first Trustees. Brown died on June 7, 1863. He was buried in Lake View Cemetery in Jamestown, New York.

=== Electoral history ===
1826 New York State Assembly election
Party	Candidate	Votes	%
Clintonian	Samuel A. Brown	1,696	24.85%
Bucktail	Elial T. Foote	2,312	33.88%
Bucktail	Nathan Mixer	1,619	23.73%
Clintonian	Philo Orton	1,197	17.54%
