= Jediah Prendergast =

American physician and politician (1766–1848)

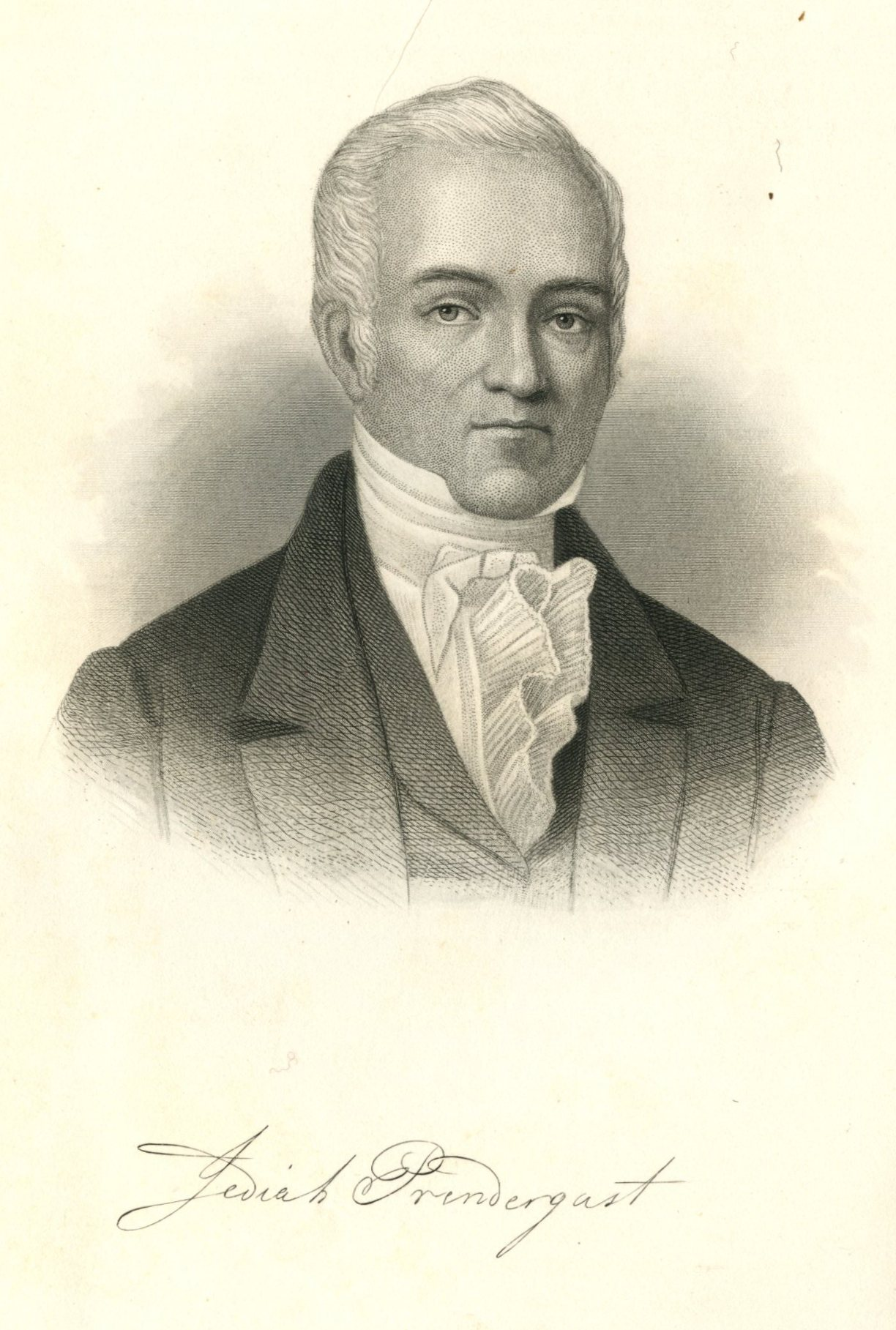

New York State Senate
- In office July 1, 1817 – June 30, 1818
- Preceded by: Chauncey Loomis

New York State Assembly
- In office June 30, 1820 – June 30, 1821
- Preceded by: Elial T. Foote; Oliver Forward
- Succeeded by: Thomas B. Campbell; David Eason

New York State Assembly
- In office July 1, 1816 – June 30, 1817
- Preceded by: Daniel McCleary; Elias Osborn
- Succeeded by: Robert Fleming; Philo Orton

Personal details
- Born: May 13, 1766 Pawling, New York
- Died: March 1, 1848 (aged 81)
- Resting place: Prendergast Cemetery
- Occupation: Politician

Jediah Prendergast (May 13, 1766 – March 1, 1848) was an American medical doctor and politician. He served in both the New York State Assembly and New York State Senate.

== Biography ==
=== Early life and career ===
Prendergast was born on May 13, 1766, in Pawling, New York, a son of William Prendergast, Sr. (1727-1811) and Mehetabel Wing (1738-1812). Among his siblings included John J. Prendergast, a New York State Senator, and James Prendergast, the founder and namesake of Jamestown, New York. After the American Revolution, the Prendergast family, consisting of the children, grandchildren, and servants, traveled to Wheeling, West Virginia and then to Louisville, Kentucky, before they arrived in Memphis, Tennessee. Unsatisfied, the family moved to Upper Canada in what is now Ontario. Jedediah Prendergast was a practicing physician in Canada. His nephew William studied medicine under his practice until 1811.

The Prendergast family moved to Chautauqua County, New York, and Jediah settled in Mayville in 1811. Here, he went into business as a merchant with his brother Martin, but remained as a practicing physician. He also purchased 350 acres of land south of Mayville. Prendergast was married to Penelope Chase, a native of Rhode Island. They had a daughter, Catherine Rodman Prendergast.

=== Politics ===
Prendergast entered politics and was elected to the New York State Assembly and served in the 40th New York State Legislature from July 1, 1816, to June 30, 1817.

In April 1817, Prendergast ran for New York State Senate. There were two vacancies, for which Isaac Wilson was also a candidate. There was a four-year and one-year term, in which the candidate with the highest number of votes would be elected to the four-year term. When Wilson claimed to have won the 4-year-year term by a vote of 15,009—14,985, Prendergast challenged this as 91 votes were cast for "Jedediah" Prendergast and 10 votes were cast for "Jed" Prendergast. The committee on elections ruled in favor of Prendergast, but this was overturned by the committee of the whole, and as a result, Wilson was elected to a four-year term and Prendergast was elected to a one-year term, serving until June 30, 1818.

In 1819, he was elected President of the Chautauqua County Medical Society to serve for a year. Prendergast was once again elected to the New York State Assembly and served in the 44th New York State Legislature and served from July 1, 1820, to June 30, 1821.

=== Later life ===
Jediah Prendergast's wife Penelope died on February 1, 1845, while visiting family in Canada. She was buried in Canada. Jediah Prendergast died on March 1, 1848. He was buried in Prendergast Cemetery in Chautauqua County.

== Electoral history ==
1816 New York State Assembly election Cattaraugus, Chautauque, and Niagara Counties
Party	Candidate	Votes	%
Democratic-Republican	Jediah Prendergast	1,384	
Democratic-Republican	Richard Smith	1,481	
Federalist	John Bleach	844	
Federalist	Samuel Sinclair	758	

1817 New York State Senate election
Party	Candidate	Votes	%
Democratic-Republican	Jediah Prendergast	15,009	
Democratic-Republican	Isaac Wilson	14,985	

1820 New York State Assembly election Cattaraugus, Chautauque, and Niagara Counties
Party	Candidate	Votes	%
Clintonian	William Hotchkiss	2,444	
Clintonian	Jediah Prendergast	2,442	
	Samuel Russell	2,055	
	Timothy H. Porter	2,047	
