= The New York Times wedding announcements =

Section in the New York Times

The New York Times has posted wedding announcements since its founding in 1851.

The New York Times was founded in 1851 as the New-York Daily Times. In its first issue, taking place on September 18, 1851, its first wedding announcement was featured: "In Trinity Church, Fredonia, on the 15th, inst., by Rev. T.P. Tyler, JOHN M. GRANT, Esq., of Jamestown, to SARAH, daughter of Hon. JAMES MULLETT of Fredonia." In the following decades, the paper reported both large-scale society weddings in detail, and wedding announcements that had been submitted in short notices. By 1865, the paper was receiving up to twenty submissions an issue. The couples listed were often from extremely wealthy and powerful families, and were generally White Anglo-Saxon Protestants. One early exception was the 1895 marriage of Ida B. Wells to Ferdinand Lee Barnett, which was covered on the front page, and described the groom as "a local colored attorney of prominence".

By the 1950s, the section dedicated to wedding announcements could go over a dozen pages. Distinguishing attributes such as lineage and membership in private clubs was emphasised, one entry describing: "She is descended from Richard Warren, who came to Brookhaven in 1664. Her husband, a descendant of Dr. Benjamin Treadwell, who settled in Old Westbury in 1767, is an alumnus of Gunnery School and a senior at Colgate University."

Members of high society continued to dominate the announcements in the 1960s, featuring figures in such families as the Fords, Rockefellers and du Ponts. In one sample of announcements from much of the 1960s and some of the early 1970s, over two thirds of the brides and grooms were included in the Social Register or were identified as having attended particular private schools associated with the upper class. Many papers in the United States hosted society reporting at this time, though those included in the Sunday edition of the New York Times were by far the most highly-regarded.

As of the 21st century, the demographics of who featured in the wedding announcements had changed somewhat. Announcements often highlighted the education or employment of the couple—attendance at Ivy League schools and well-regarded employers. Jewish couples were featured particularly often. Wedding announcements of gay couples began to be included from 2002. Few marriages between African-Americans were featured, despite outreach efforts by staff to Black churches and other community organizations.

== Sources ==
- Blumberg, Paul M.; Paul, P. W. (February 1975). "Continuities and Discontinuities in Upper-Class Marriages". Journal of Marriage and Family. 37 (1). doi:10.2307/351031.
- Brooks, David (2000). Bobos in Paradise. New York: Simon & Schuster. ISBN 0-684-85377-9.
