= Squire White =

American politician and jurist (1785–1857)

New York State Assembly
- In office January 1, 1830 – December 21, 1832
- Preceded by: Abner Hazeltine; Nathan Mixer
- Succeeded by: Alvin Plumb; Nathaniel Gray

Personal details
- Born: November 20, 1785 Guilford, Vermont, U.S.
- Died: April 2, 1857 (aged 71) Fredonia, New York, U.S.
- Party: Anti-Masonic
- Occupation: Politician

Squire White (November 20, 1785 – April 2, 1857) was an American physician and politician. He served three terms in the New York State Assembly (1830–1832), representing Chautauqua County, New York.

== Biography ==
Squire White was born on November 20, 1785, in Guilford, Vermont, to William White. He attended public schools and began his medical studies under Dr. Pettil in Cazenovia, New York. He continued his education under Dr. Joseph White in Cherry Valley, New York, and at Columbia College (now Columbia College of New York), where he earned his degree in medicine.

In 1808, Dr. White moved to Fredonia, New York, to practice medicine. Initially, he taught at Sheridan Township, but his medical practice grew significantly, requiring his full attention. In 1804, Hezekiah Barker, whose daughter White married, purchased 400 acres of land in Fredonia. In 1811, White bought 25 acres of this land from Barker, part of which is now Forest Hill Cemetery. In the same year, he built a frame building at the corner of Main and White streets, where his children were born. This building was moved in 1868, and his son, Devillo Asa White, constructed the family's current home on White Street. The original house was later demolished.

White was appointed the first surrogate of Chautauqua County, New York, on February 9, 1811, by Governor Daniel D. Tompkins. He served in this position for several years. During the burning of Buffalo in 1812 by British forces, he was on business there and was conscripted into the United States Army as a surgeon for the 169th Regiment of New York Infantry.

In November 1829, he was elected to the New York State Assembly and served three terms. He served alongside Abner Hazeltine in the 53rd New York State Legislature (1830), alongside John Birdsall in the 54th New York State Legislature (1831), and alongside Theron Bly in the 55th New York State Legislature (1832).

White died in Fredonia on April 2, 1857.
