= Walter Gifford =

Walter Gifford may refer to:

- Walter Sherman Gifford (1885–1966), president of the AT&T Corporation, and United States ambassador to the United Kingdom
- Walter C. Gifford (1829–1909), American farmer and politician from New York
