= Philo Orton =

Philo Orton may refer to:

- Philo A. Orton, a Wisconsin politician
- Philo Orton (New York politician), a New York politician
