= Richard Goodell =

American politician (1784–1826)

Richard Goodell (July 18, 1784 – January 25, 1826) was an American military officer and politician who served as Speaker of the New York State Assembly.

== Biography ==
Born in Pomfret, Connecticut on July 18, 1784, he was the son of Richard Goodell, Sr. (a veteran of the American Revolution) and Mercy Parkhurst Goodell. Goddell lived in Adams, New York and owned a farm.

He served in the United States Army and New York Militia, and attained the rank of Major. He was a veteran of the 23rd Infantry Regiment in the War of 1812, and participated in the Second Battle of Sacket's Harbor.

A Democratic-Republican, he identified with the Bucktails, the faction opposed to the policies of Governor DeWitt Clinton. He was a member of the New York State Assembly from Jefferson County from 1820 to 1821, and from 1823 to 1825. In 1824, he was elected Speaker.

In 1825, he was appointed Keeper of Auburn State Prison. He died suddenly in Auburn on January 25, 1826. He is buried at Adams Rural Cemetery. His epitaph reads:

Sacred to the Memory of the Hon. Richard Goodell, who departed this life 25th Jan, 1826 in the 42nd year of his age.
Here lies a soldier
Here a brave man rests

In April 1826, the State Legislature ordered the payment of the remainder of his annual salary to his widow, Hetty Tyler Goodell (1783-1856).

== Sources ==
- John Stilwell Jenkins: History of Political Parties in the State of New-York (Alden & Markham, Auburn NY, 1846)
- Richard Goodell at Political Graveyard
- Obit in Monroe Republican, February 7, 1826
- History at Ray's Place, mention at History of Adams N.Y.
- Google Books The New York Civil List, compiled by Franklin B. Hough (Weed, Parsons & Co., Albany NY, 1858)
- The Laws of New York

Political offices
Preceded by Peter R. Livingston	Speaker of the New York State Assembly; 1824	Succeeded by Clarkson Crolius
