= James Mullett Jr. =

American politician

Member of the New York State Assembly
- In office January 1, 1823 – December 31, 1824
- Preceded by: Thomas B. Campbell; Isaac Phelps
- Succeeded by: Nathaniel Fenton; Nathan Mixer

Personal details
- Born: October 13, 1784 Whitingham, Vermont, U.S.
- Died: September 10, 1858 (aged 73) Fredonia, New York, U.S.
- Spouse: Sally Fitch (m. 1816)
- Children: 6
- Occupation: Lawyer, politician, judge

James Mullett Jr. (October 13, 1784 – September 10, 1858) was an American lawyer, judge, and politician. Active in Western New York, he was originally from Vermont. Mullett served two terms in the New York State Assembly (1823–1824) and was elected to the New York Supreme Court in 1847.

== Biography ==
Mullett was born on October 13, 1784, in Whitingham, Vermont, as the eldest of 13 children of James Mullett Sr. and Sylvinia Perry. His family moved to Darien, New York, around 1800. Mullett first worked as a joiner and millwright. In 1810, he accepted a job as a clerk in Fredonia, New York, and moved there.

=== Law career ===
While working as a clerk in Fredonia, Mullett acted as stand-in counsel for his employer when their attorney failed to appear in court. Mullett subsequently began formal study under a lawyer in Fredonia, Jacob Houghton; another student of Houghton's was Elijah Risley. Mullett was admitted to practice law in the Chautauqua County Court of the Common Pleas in November 1814, and in the New York State Supreme Court in June 1816.

Mullett moved to Buffalo in 1841, and continued to practice law there. He was appointed Attorney for the City of Buffalo in 1846. He held that role for a year, then was elected to serve on the New York Supreme Court in June 1847.

=== Political career ===
As a member of the Bucktails—a faction of the Democratic-Republican Party opposed to Governor of New York DeWitt Clinton—Mullett was elected and served in the 46th New York State Legislature for calendar year 1823, and in the 47th New York State Legislature for calendar year 1824, representing Chautauqua County. In 1827, he again ran for Assembly as a Bucktail, but lost the election.

=== Later years ===
In 1851, Mullett was seriously injured when thrown from his carriage, suffering a fractured skull. He died in 1858 in Fredonia. His widow, Sally, lived until 1890.

== Electoral history ==
1827 New York State Assembly election
Party	Candidate	Votes	%
Bucktail	James Mullett Jr.	1,232	17.96%
Anti-Masonic	Nathaniel Fenton	2,192	31.97%
Anti-Masonic	Nathan Mixer	2,332	24.01%
Bucktail	Thomas A. Osborne	1,101	16.06%
