= Lake View Cemetery (Jamestown, New York) =

Cemetery in Chautauqua County, New York, US

Coordinates: 42.1096451°N 79.2381382°W

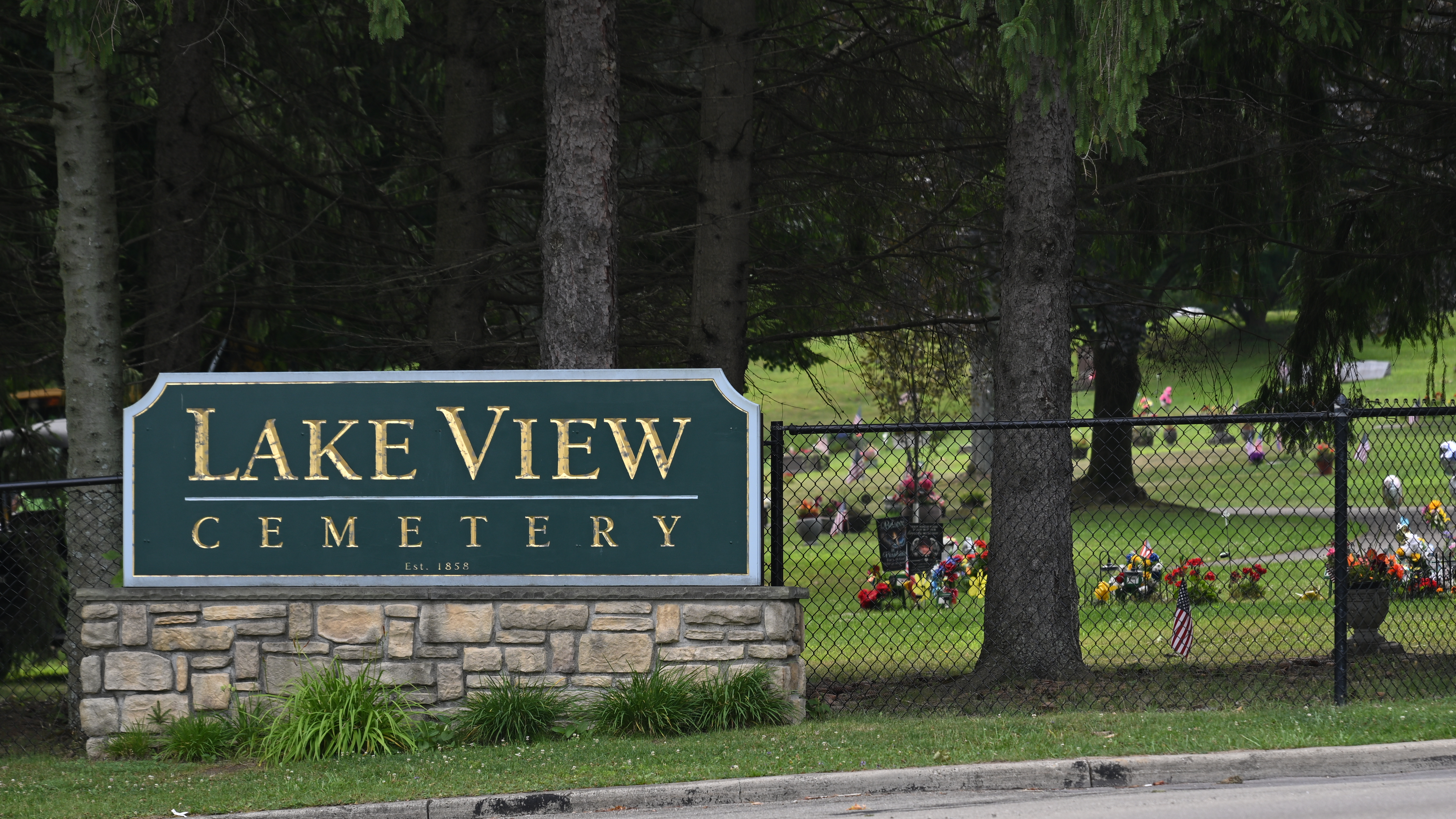
- Interactive map of Lake View Cemetery

Details
- Established: 1859
- Location: 907 Lakeview Ave., Jamestown, New York
- Country: United States
- Owned by: Lake View Cemetery Association
- No. of graves: 43,000+
- Website: lakeviewcemeteryny.com
- Find a Grave: Lake View Cemetery

Lake View Cemetery is a cemetery in the city of Jamestown, in Chautauqua County, New York, United States.

== History ==
Prior to the cemetery's establishment in 1859, there were prior cemeteries that had been established in Jamestown, New York. Lake View Cemetery was established in 1859 as part of the mid-19th-century “rural cemetery” movement, when growing communities sought spacious, landscaped grounds beyond overcrowded town burial sites.

That year, Jamestown residents formed a nonprofit association and elected trustees to acquire and develop about 37.5 acres (15.2 ha) on the north side of the town. On October 5, 1859, the new cemetery was formally dedicated in a ceremony attended by local leaders and townspeople. Over the ensuing decades, Lake View expanded to more than 150 acres (61 ha) and has accommodated over 46,000 burials, with additional undeveloped land reserved for future needs.

The Fenton History Center hosts the annual Saints and Sinners Cemetery Tours in the cemetery.

== Notable burials ==
- Edith Ainge (1873–1948), American suffragist
- Augustus F. Allen (1813–1875), American politician
- Charles Justin Bailey (1859–1946), American U.S. Army major general
- Fred Ball (1915–2007), American movie studio executive
- Lucille Ball (1911–1989), American comedian and actress
- Samuel Barrett (1792–1872), New York State assemblyman
- Samuel A. Brown (1795–1863), American attorney and New York State Assemblyman (1827, 1845)
- Henri Le Fevre Brown (1845–1910), Civil War soldier and Medal of Honor recipient
- Samuel A. Carlson (1868–1961), 7th & 9th Mayor of Jamestown, New York
- Reuben Fenton (1819–1885), 22nd Governor of New York (1865–1868) and U.S. Senator from New York (1869–1875)
- Elial T. Foote (1796–1877), New York State Assemblyman and Chautauqua County Judge
- J. Samuel Fowler (1874–1961), Member of the New York Assembly (1899–1903) and Senate (1918–1920)
- Walter C. Gifford (1829–1909), Member of the New York Assembly (1891–1902)
- Charles Goodell (1926–1987), U.S. Congressman (1959–1968) and U.S. Senator from New York (1968–1971)
- Benjamin Goodrich (1841–1888), American industrialist and founder of the B.F. Goodrich Company
- Chapin Hall (1816–1879), U.S. Congressman (1859–1861)
- Abner Hazeltine (1793–1879), U.S. Congressman (1833–1837)
- E. Herman Magnuson (1894–1955), Member of the New York State Assembly (1941–1955)
- Richard P. Marvin (1803–1892), U.S. Congressman (1837–1941)
- James Prendergast (1764–1846), founder of Jamestown, New York
- Edgar Pierpont Putnam (1844–1921), Civil War soldier and Medal of Honor recipient
- Porter Sheldon (1831–1908), U.S. Congressman (1869–1871)
- Arthur C. Wade (1852–1915), American lawyer and politician
- James M. Young (1843–1913), Civil War Soldier and Medal of Honor recipient
