= Edgar P. Putnam =

American businessman and Medal of Honor recipient (1844–1921)

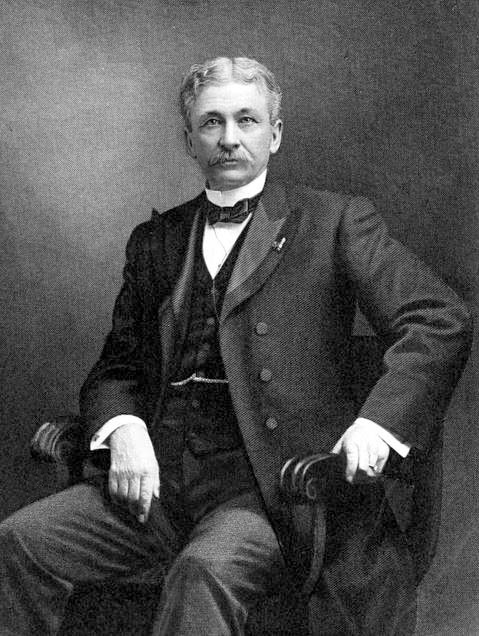
- Born: 4 May 1844; Stockton, New York, US
- Died: 20 May 1921 (aged 77)
- Burial place: Lake View Cemetery; Jamestown, New York, U.S.
- Military career
- Allegiance: United States
- Branch: Union Army
- Service years: 1861–1865
- Rank: Captain; Brevet Major
- Units: 9th New York Volunteer Cavalry Regiment - Companies D & I
- Conflicts: American Civil War
- Awards: Medal of Honor

Signature
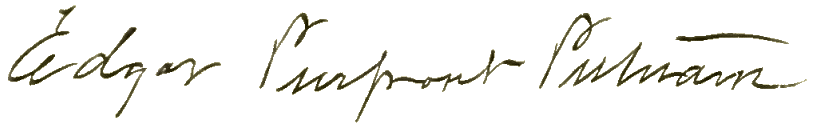

Edgar Pierpont Putnam (4 May 1844 – 20 May 1921) was an American businessman and civic leader in Jamestown, New York. As a young man, he served in the Union Army cavalry during the American Civil War, advancing from private to captain and ultimately receiving the Medal of Honor for his actions as a sergeant leading a scouting party on the day before the 1864 Battle of Totopotomoy Creek in Virginia.

== Biography ==
Putnam was born in Stockton, New York, the only child of James Rogers Putnam and Maria Louisa Flagg. At the age of seventeen, he enlisted in Company D of the 9th New York Volunteer Cavalry on 11 September 1861. Putnam's regiment served in the Army of the Potomac and General Philip Sheridan's Cavalry Corps and he participated in all of their engagements. During the course of the war, he advanced from private to corporal and then sergeant. During the 1863 Battle of Gettysburg, Putnam was assigned to General John Geary's staff.

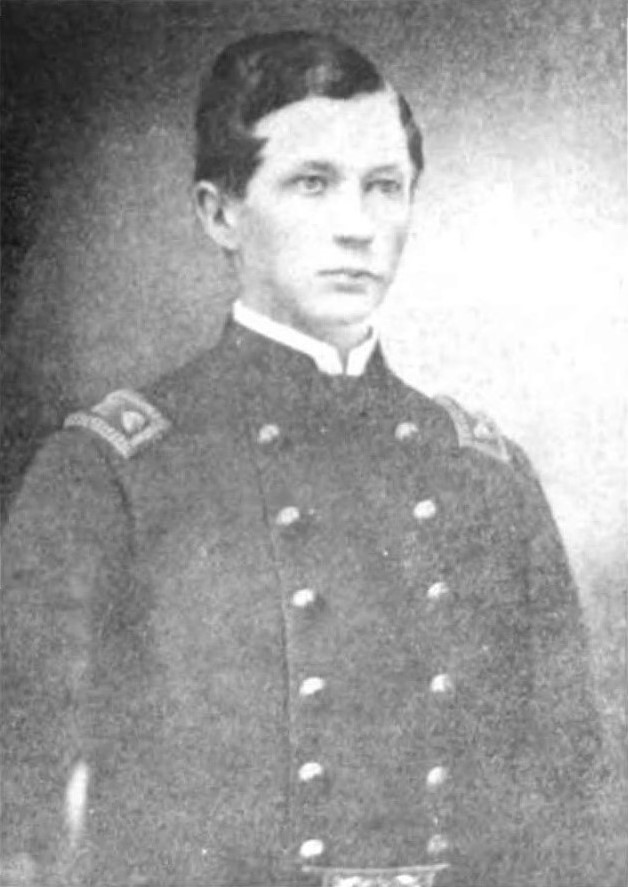
Brevet Maj. Putnam in May 1865

On 27 May 1864, Sergeant Putnam led a small reconnaissance patrol near Crumps Creek in Hanover County, Virginia. On 13 May 1892, he was awarded the Congressional Medal of Honor for his brave leadership and initiative against superior enemy forces. Putnam was promoted to first lieutenant in Company D later in 1864 and then to captain in Company I early the following year. He was wounded twice during the war, first on 11 June 1864 during the Battle of Trevilian Station and then again on 1 April 1865 at the Battle of Five Forks. Putnam was brevetted major for his gallant and meritorious service and mustered out on 17 July 1865.

After the war, Putnam served as Deputy U.S. Surveyor in Minnesota from 1866 to 1873. On 4 May 1868, he married Angelia E. "Angie" Lewis in Spring Creek, Minnesota. They had two daughters, but his wife and older daughter both died in 1875.

Putnam returned to New York state in 1874, where he became a merchant of drugs and books in Jamestown until 1888. He married Mary Eppie Mace there on 27 February 1878. From 1884 to 1885, Putnam served as postmaster. He was the Chautauqua County clerk from 1889 to 1892, when he was elected superintendent of parks in Jamestown. A Republican, Putnam later became commissioner of parks. He also served on several company boards of directors.

After his death in 1921, Putnam was interred at the Lake View Cemetery in Jamestown.

== Medal of Honor citation ==
With a small force on a reconnaissance, drove off a strong body of the enemy, charged into another force of the enemy's cavalry and stampeded them, taking 27 prisoners.
