= Samuel Rexford =

American politician

Samuel Rexford (October 14, 1776 Claverack, then in Albany Co., now in Columbia County, New York - February 24, 1857 Lock Haven, Clinton County, Pennsylvania) was an American politician from New York.

== Life ==
He was in the lumber business. He was Supervisor of the Town of Sidney in 1826 and 1827.

He was a member of the New York State Assembly (Delaware Co.) in 1823.

He was a member of the New York State Senate (2nd D.) from 1829 to 1832, sitting in the 52nd, 53rd, 54th and 55th New York State Legislatures.

== Sources ==
- The New York Civil List compiled by Franklin Benjamin Hough (pages 127f, 144, 199 and 299; Weed, Parsons and Co., 1858)
- History of Sidney, on-line version of The History of Delaware County by W. W. Munsell
- Death notice in Annual Obituary Notes of Eminent Persons, for 1857 by Nathan Crosby (Boston, 1858; pg. 284f)
- Rexford genealogy

New York State Senate
Preceded by Wells Lake	New York State Senate; Second District (Class 2); 1829–1832	Succeeded by John Sudam
