= James M. Young =

Medal of Honor recipient (1843–1913)

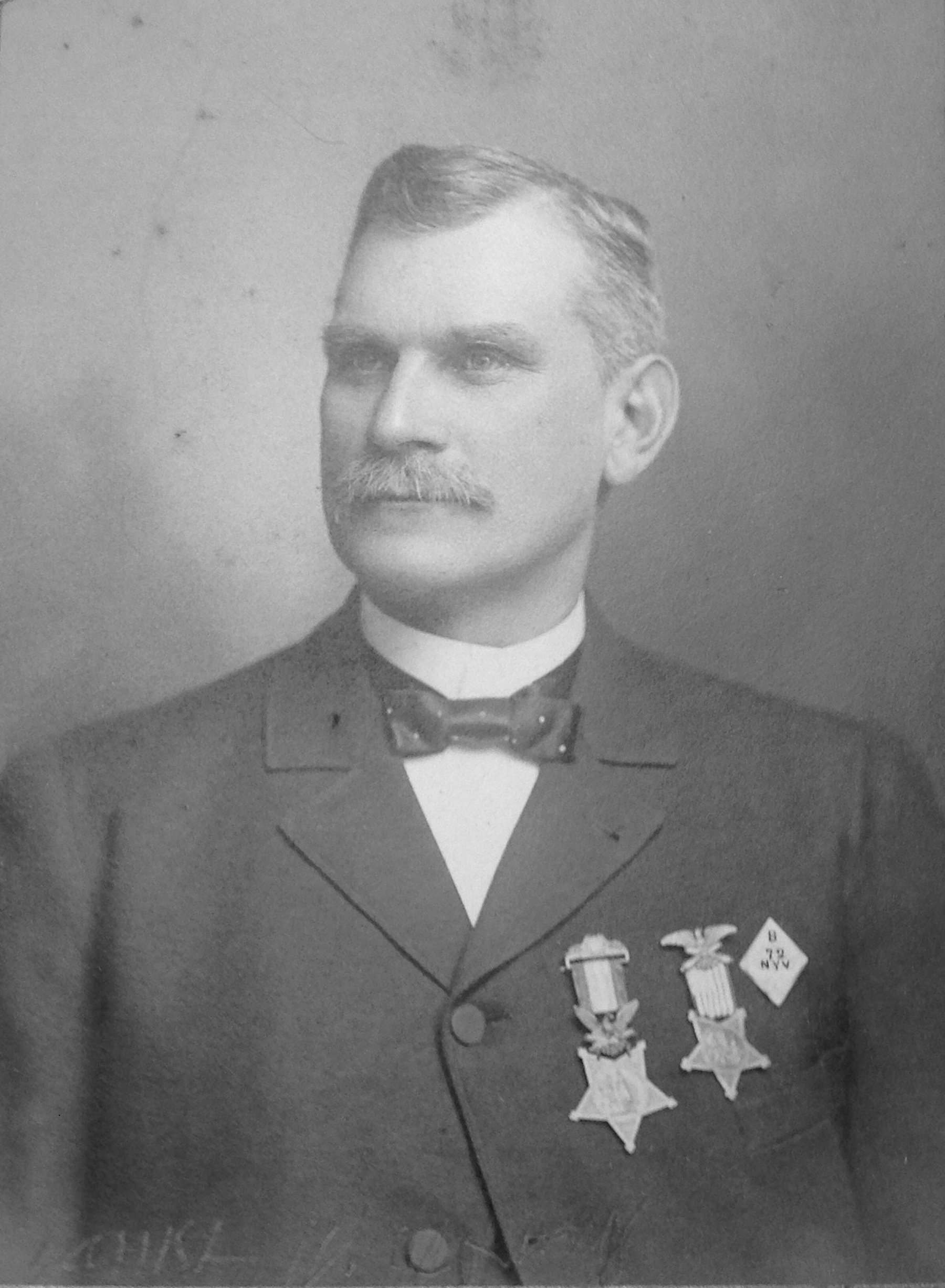
- Born: December 2, 1843; Ellicott, New York
- Died: November 30, 1913 (aged 69); Jamestown, New York
- Burial place: Lake View Cemetery
- Military career
- Allegiance: United States of America
- Branch: United States Army
- Rank: Private
- Units: (New York (state)) Company B, 72nd New York Infantry
- Conflicts: Battle of the Wilderness; American Civil War
- Awards: Medal of Honor

James Marvin Young (December 2, 1843 – November 30, 1913) was an American soldier who fought in the American Civil War. Young received his country's highest award for bravery during combat, the Medal of Honor. Young's medal was won for his heroism in the Battle of the Wilderness during the Overland Campaign in Virginia on May 6, 1864. He was honored with the award on April 2, 1898.

Young was born in Ellicott, New York, and entered service in Chautauqua County, New York.

After the war, he worked as a policeman in Jamestown for 30 years. He died at his home there on November 30, 1913. He was buried in Lake View Cemetery.

== Medal of Honor citation ==
The President of the United States of America, in the name of Congress, takes pleasure in presenting the Medal of Honor to Private James Marvin Young, United States Army, for extraordinary heroism on 6 May 1864, while serving with Company B, 72d New York Infantry, in action during the Wilderness Campaign, Virginia. With two companions, Private Young voluntarily went forward in the forest to reconnoiter the enemy's position, was fired upon and one of his companions disabled. Private Young took the wounded man upon his back and, under fire, carried him within the Union lines.

== See also ==
- List of American Civil War Medal of Honor recipients: T–Z
