= Nathan Mixer =

American politician, jurist

New York State Assembly
- In office January 1, 1825 – January 1, 1826
- Preceded by: James Mullett Jr.
- Succeeded by: Elial T. Foote

New York State Assembly
- In office January 1, 1828 – December 31, 1829
- Preceded by: Samuel A. Brown; Elial T. Foote
- Succeeded by: Squire White

Personal details
- Born: May 4, 1786 Framingham, Massachusetts, U.S.
- Died: Unknown
- Occupation: Politician

Nathan Mixer was an American politician. He served three terms in the New York State Assembly (1825–1826, 1829).

== Biography ==
Mixer was born on May 4, 1786, in Framingham, Massachusetts. He moved with his father's family first to Madison County, and then to Hanover, New York in 1817. In 1816, he had purchased Jonathan Bartoo's mill property. Mixer served as the Supervisor for the Town of Hanover from 1820 to 1824 and 1826 to 1826, and was a member of the Chautauqua County Board of Supervisors at that time. He was Chairman of the Board of Supervisors in 1826.

Mixer served three terms in the New York State Assembly, representing Chautauqua County, New York. He was elected to the 48th New York State Legislature served from January 1, 1825, to January 1, 1826. He ran again in 1826, but lost to Elial Foote and Samuel Brown.

Mixer again served in the 51st New York State Legislature alongside Nathaniel Fenton from January 1—December 31, 1828 and in the 52nd New York State Legislature alongside Abner Hazeltine from January 1—December 31, 1829.

=== Electoral history ===
1826 New York State Assembly election
Party	Candidate	Votes	%
Clintonian	Samuel A. Brown	1,696	24.85%
Bucktail	Elial T. Foote	2,312	33.88%
Bucktail	Nathan Mixer	1,619	23.73%
Clintonian	Philo Orton	1,197	17.54%

1827 New York State Assembly election
Party	Candidate	Votes	%
Bucktail	James Mullett Jr.	1,232	17.96%
Anti-Masonic	Nathaniel Fenton	2,192	31.97%
Anti-Masonic	Nathan Mixer	2,332	24.01%
Bucktail	Thomas A. Osborne	1,101	16.06%

1828 New York State Assembly election
Party	Candidate	Votes	%
Jacksonian	John McAlister	1,158	17.12%
Anti-Masonic	Abner Hazeltine	2,056	30.40%
Anti-Masonic	Nathan Mixer	2,091	30.92%
Jacksonian	James White	1,458	21.56%
