= John Sudam =

American politician (1782–1835)

Member of the New York Senate from the 2nd district
- In office 1833–1835
- Preceded by: Samuel Rexford
- Succeeded by: Ebenezer Lounsbery

Member of the New York Senate from the 2nd district
- In office 1823–1824
- Preceded by: new district
- Succeeded by: Wells Lake

Regent of the University of the State of New York
- In office 1829–1835

Personal details
- Born: March 23, 1782
- Died: April 13, 1835 (aged 53) Albany, New York, U.S.
- Resting place: Sharp Burying Ground, Kingston, New York
- Party: Jacksonian
- Spouses: Ann Tallmadge (m. 1805; died 1809); Mary Harrison Elmendorf
- Children: Several
- Occupation: Lawyer, politician

John Sudam (sometimes stylized Suydam; March 23, 1782 – April 13, 1835) was an American lawyer and politician from New York. He served in the New York State Senate from 1823 to 1824 and again from 1833 until his death, and was a Regent of the University of the State of New York from 1829 until his death.

== Life ==
Sudam was a lawyer who practiced in Kingston, New York.

=== Political career ===
He was a member of the New York State Senate (2nd District) from 1823 to 1824, sitting in the 46th and 47th New York State Legislatures.

He was a Regent of the University of the State of New York from 1829 until his death.

He was again a member of the State Senate (2nd District) from 1833 until his death, sitting in the 56th, 57th, and 58th New York State Legislatures.

=== Death and burial ===
Sudam died on April 13, 1835, in Albany, New York. He was buried at the Sharp Burying Ground in Kingston, New York.

New York State Senate
Preceded by new district	New York State Senate; 2nd District (Class 2); 1823–1824	Succeeded by Wells Lake
Preceded by Samuel Rexford	New York State Senate; 2nd District (Class 2); 1833–1835	Succeeded by Ebenezer Lounsbery
