= William Hotchkiss (assemblyman) =

American judge

Member of the New York State Assembly
- In office June 30, 1820 – June 30, 1821
- Preceded by: Elial T. Foote; Oliver Forward
- Succeeded by: Thomas B. Campbell; David Eason

Personal details
- Occupation: Politician

William Hotchkiss was an American attorney, judge, and politician. He was a member of the New York State Assembly from 1820 to 1821.

== Biography ==
Hotchkiss was from Niagara County and an attorney by trade. He built a home in the 1820s, known as the Long House, and his office was in a building known as the Short House. It was a center of social activity following the War of 1812.

Hotchkiss was the First Judge of the Niagara County Court (1818–1823). He served in the 44th New York State Legislature from June 30, 1820, to June 30, 1821, alongside Jediah Prendergast. They succeeded Elial Foote and Oliver Forward. The district represented Chautauqua, Cattaraugus, and Niagara Counties.

In 1824, he ran for Congress, but was defeated by Daniel G. Garnsey.

== Electoral history ==
1820 New York State Assembly election Cattaraugus, Chautauque, and Niagara Counties
Party	Candidate	Votes	%
Clintonian	William Hotchkiss	2,444	
Clintonian	Jediah Prendergast	2,442	
	Samuel Russell	2,055	
	Timothy H. Porter	2,047	
