= Isaac Phelps (politician) =

American politician and judge (1783–1861)

Isaac Phelps, Jr.

Member of the New York State Assembly
- In office July 1, 1817 – June 30, 1819
- Preceded by: Philo Orton
- Succeeded by: Elial T. Foote; Oliver Forward

Member of the New York State Assembly
- In office January 5, 1822 – December 31, 1822
- Preceded by: David Eason
- Succeeded by: Stephen Crosby (Cattaraugus); James Mullett Jr. (Chautauqua); Ebenezer F. Norton (Erie); Benjamin Barlow Jr. (Niagara)

Personal details
- Born: April 4, 1783 Vermont
- Died: June 1, 1861 (aged 78) New York
- Occupation: Politician

Isaac Phelps, Jr. (April 4, 1783—June 1, 1861) was an American politician and judge from Erie County, New York. He served three terms in the New York State Assembly (1817—1819; 1822).

== Biography ==
Phelps was born on April 4, 1783, in Vermont. He was elected to the 41st New York State Legislature, serving from July 1, 1817, to June 30, 1818, alongside Robert Fleming and representing Niagara, Cattaraugus, and Chautauqua Counties. He also served in the 42nd New York State Legislature alongside Philo Orton. Phelps was appointed Judge of the Common Pleas of Erie County, New York in 1820.

Phelps was a member of the Democratic-Republican Party and was elected to the New York State Assembly and served in the 45th New York State Legislature, representing Cattaraugus, Chautauqua, Erie and Niagara Counties. David Eason was originally declared the winner and served part of the term, but Phelps contested the election. Eason received 2,226 votes, "Isaac Phelps, Junior" received 2,275 votes and "Isaac Phelps" received 178 votes, for a combined total of 2,453 for Phelps. It was ruled that Phelps was the winner of the election, and was seated on January 5, 1822, and served the remainder of the term, which ended on December 31, 1822. He served alongside Thomas B. Campbell.

In 1835, the first anti-slavery society was organized at Friggin's Mills and Phelps was among the leading members. Phelps died on June 1, 1861.

== Electoral history ==
1817 New York State Assembly election Cattaraugus, Chautauque, and Niagara Counties
Party	Candidate	Votes	%
	Isaac Phelps	1,233	
	Robert Fleming	1,191	

1821 New York State Assembly election Cattaraugus, Chautauque, Erie, and Niagara Counties
Party	Candidate	Votes	%
Democratic-Republican	David Eason	2,426	
Democratic-Republican	Isaac Phelps	2,453	
