= Wells Lake (politician) =

American politician (1772–1839)

Wells Lake (January 12, 1772 – November 26, 1839) was an American farmer and politician from New York.

== Life ==
Wells Lake was born January 12, 1772, in Stratford, Connecticut, the son of David (1733-1800) and Sarah Wells Lake (1742-1803). Through his mother, Lake is a direct descendant of Connecticut Governor Thomas Welles. It is unclear when Lake moved to New York, but it was there that he met his wife, Ruth (née Hine) Lake (1782-1827), and married her in 1801. Ruth's brother, Reuben Holmes Hine, was the New Paltz Town Supervisor in 1842 and a New York State Assemblyman in 1844.

He lived in that part of the Town of New Paltz which was separated in 1845 as the Town of Lloyd, in Ulster County, New York.

He was a member of the New York State Assembly (Sullivan and Ulster Co.) in 1820-21; and (Ulster Co.) in 1823

He was a member of the New York State Senate (2nd D.) from 1825 to 1828, sitting in the 48th, 49th, 50th and 51st New York State Legislatures.

Separated by his terms in both New York State branches, Lake served as the Supervisor of New Paltz from 1818 to 1819 and 1821 to 1824.

In 1834, he served as President of the Ulster County Jackson Republican Convention.

He died on November 26, 1839, in New Paltz, and was buried in the Highland Cemetery in Highland, New York.

== Personal life ==
Wells Lake and his wife Ruth had at least 11 children:

1. Hiram Lake (1801-1837)
2. Mary Lake (1803-1853)
3. Lewis Hine Lake (1803-1873)
4. Sarah Lake (1807-1875)
5. Stephen Lake (1809-1861)
6. Harriet Lake (1811-1902)
7. Lydia Lake (1814-1880)
8. Eli Lake (1816-1877)
9. Ruth Lake (1816-1888)
10. Emily Lake (1818-?)
11. Olive Lake (1821-?)

His son Stephen served as the second Town of Lloyd Supervisor from 1849 to 1851. Stephen's brother-in-law, Reuben Deyo (1800-1864), had served as the first following the Lloyd split from New Paltz (1845-1848).

His daughter Ruth married John Benson Schoonmaker (1810-1895), and they named their son Wells Lake Schoonmaker, after Ruth's father. Wells L. Schoonmaker served as the Town of Marbletown Supervisor from 1884 to 1885. Another son, Hiram Schoonmaker (1836-1910), married Josephine Chambers, daughter of physician, Supervisor and State Senator George Chambers.

== Sources ==
- The New York Civil List compiled by Franklin Benjamin Hough (pages 126f, 142, 197, 200 and 286; Weed, Parsons and Co., 1858)
- The History of Ulster County, New York by Alphonso T. Clearwater (pg. 270f)
- De Witt Clinton and the Rise of the People's Men by Craig Hanyan & Mary L. Hanyan (pg. 258)

New York State Senate
Preceded by John Sudam	New York State Senate; Second District (Class 2); 1825 - 1828	Succeeded by Samuel Rexford
Preceded by John I. LeFevre	New Paltz Supervisor; Ulster County; 1818 - 1819	Succeeded by Jonathan DuBois
Preceded by Jonathan DuBois	New Paltz Supervisor; Ulster County; 1821 - 1824	Succeeded by Jacob I. Schoonmaker
