= Theron Bly =

American politician (1786–1850)

New York State Assembly
- In office January 1, 1832 – December 31, 1832
- Preceded by: John Birdsall
- Succeeded by: Alvin Plumb; Nathaniel Gray

Personal details
- Born: July 31, 1786 Bennington, Vermont, U.S.
- Died: March 14, 1850 (aged 63)
- Party: Anti-Masonic
- Occupation: Politician

Theron Bly (July 31, 1786 – March 14, 1850) was an American politician. He was Town Supervisor of Harmony, New York from 1825 to 1831 and from 1839 to 1841. In 1832, he served one term in the New York State Assembly, representing Chautauqua County, New York.

== Biography ==
Bly was born on July 31, 1786, was born in Bennington, Vermont, a son of Asa Bly. He married Phebe Bemus in 1805. In 1810, they moved from Otsego County, New York to the Town of Harmony in Chautauqua County, settling on lot 44. They had seven children: Theron, Harvey, Desire, Henry, Sally, Perry, and William. He, along with Daniel Sherman, built a wood carding mill in 1822.

Bly was involved in politics, first serving as Supervisor of the Town of Harmony from 1825 to 1831. In 1831, he was elected to the New York State Assembly alongside Squire White, both members of the Anti-Masonic faction. Bly took office on January 1, 1832 as a member of the 55th New York State Legislature. After that term, he once again served as Supervisor of the Town of Harmony from 1839 to 1841.

Bly died on March 14, 1850 at the age of 63.
