= Elial T. Foote =

American physician, politician, jurist and historian

Elial Todd Foote
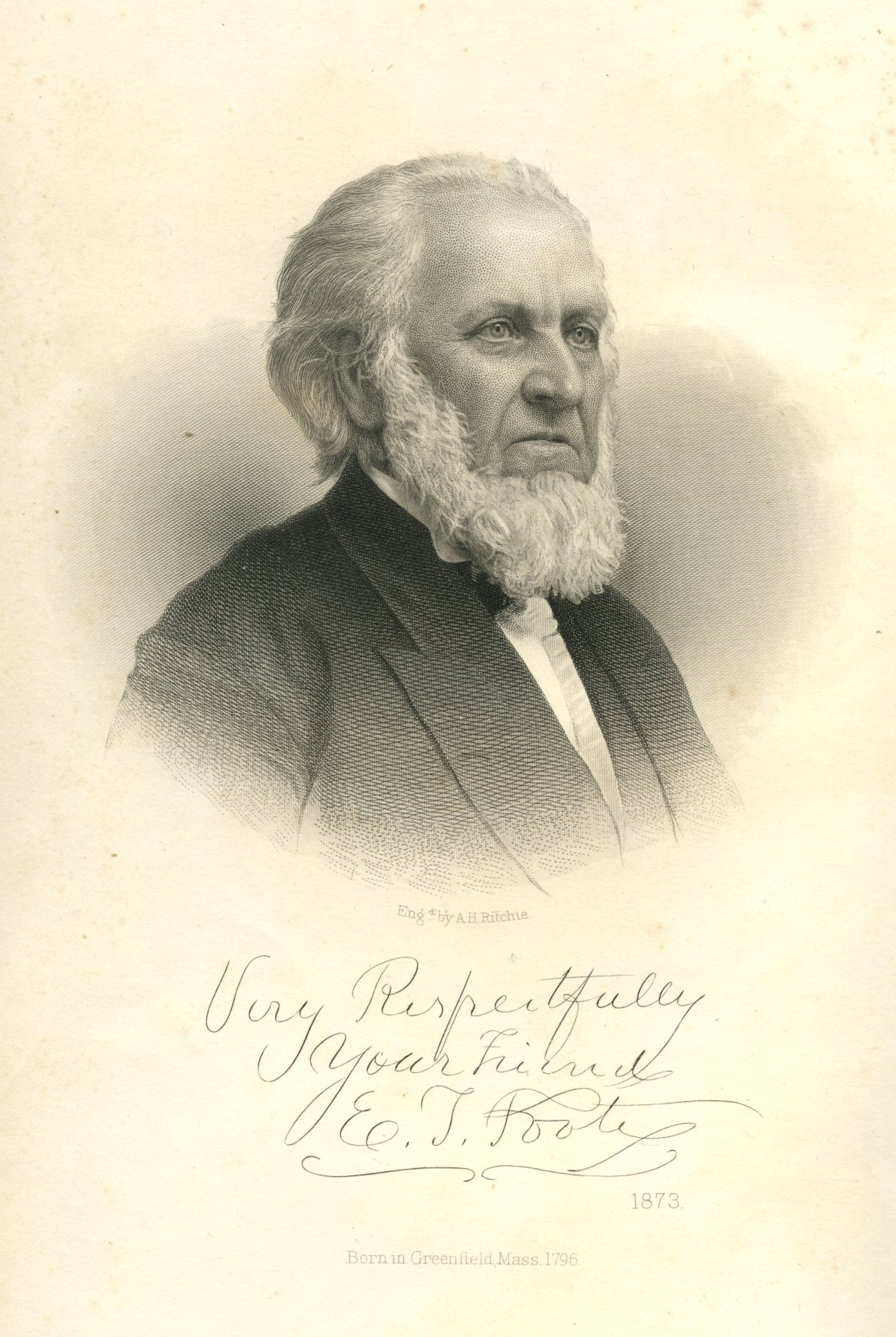

New York State Assembly
- In office July 1, 1819 – June 30, 1820
- Preceded by: Philo Orton; Isaac Phelps
- Succeeded by: William Hotchkiss; Jediah Prendergast

4th Sheriff of Chautauqua County, New York
- In office 1820–1821
- Preceded by: Eliphalet Dewey
- Succeeded by: Gilbert Douglass

New York State Assembly
- In office January 1, 1826 – December 31, 1827
- Preceded by: Nathan Mixer
- Succeeded by: Nathaniel Fenton; Nathan Mixer

2nd Judge of Chautauqua County, New York
- In office 1824–1843
- Preceded by: Zattu Cushing
- Succeeded by: Thomas A. Osborne

Personal details
- Born: May 1, 1796 Gill, Massachusetts
- Died: November 17, 1877 (aged 81) New Haven, Connecticut
- Resting place: Lake View Cemetery
- Parent(s): Samuel Foote; Sybil Doolittle Foote
- Occupation: Doctor, politician, judge

Elial Todd Foote (May 1, 1796 – November 17, 1877) was an American medical doctor, politician, jurist and historian. He was the judge of Chautauqua County, New York, from 1824 to 1843. Previously, he had three terms in the New York State Assembly (1819–1820, 1826–1827).

== Biography ==
=== Early life and career ===
Foote was born in Gill, Massachusetts, as the eldest of the 11 children of Samuel Foote (1770–1848) and Sybil Doolittle Foote (1777–1832). In 1798, his family moved to Sherburne, New York. Here, his father purchased land and operated a tavern. Foote attended schools there and at Oxford Academy.

Foote studied medicine under Dr. Guthrie and attended medical lectures in New York City. In 1815, he was licensed as a doctor by the Chenango County Medical Society. In the same year, he moved to Jamestown, New York, to begin a medical practice as the new settlement's first physician. He later abandoned the practice and turned to politics. He was married to Anna Cheney (1800–1840) and they had five children.

In 1822, he purchased 350 acres from the Holland Land Company on which he built his home the following year. This was later the site of the Jamestown Union School and Collegiate Institute and presently the site of the Jamestown High School, which is noted on a historical marker.

=== Politics ===
Foote was elected to the New York State Assembly in 1819, representing Chautauqua, Cattaraugus, and Niagara counties in the 43rd New York State Legislature in 1819–1820. He was again elected to the Assembly in 1825, to the 49th New York State Legislature in 1826, and again elected in 1826, to the 50th New York State Legislature in 1827. In the latter two terms, he represented Chautauqua County.

Foote was an associate judge of Chautauqua County in 1817 and judge of the Court of Common Pleas for Chautauqua County from 1818 to 1823, Jamestown postmaster in 1819, and the fourth Sheriff of Chautauqua county from 1820 to 1821. In 1824, he succeed Zattu Cushing as county judge of Chautauqua County and served until 1843. He was succeeded by Thomas Osborne.

Foote was the third postmaster of Jamestown, New York, succeeding Dr. Laban Hazeltine on June 13, 1829, and serving until June 8, 1841. During his tenure, he was the first postmaster in the county to introduce letterboxes for individuals, starting with 80 boxes in 1829.

Foote was an abolitionist and his papers associated with his antislavery work are preserved by the Chautauqua County Historical Society in its McClurg Museum in Westfield, New York.

=== Other ventures ===
Foote was the founder and first president of the Chautauqua County Bank, which was established in 1831. In 1836, he served as President of the Board of Trustees of the Jamestown Academy. He was also the organizer of the first Masonic Lodge in the Chautauqa County, Mt. Moriah.

Foote was involved in industrial development, including construction of the Barcelona lighthouse, establishing a steamboat route from Buffalo to Erie, and helped established Lake View Cemetery in Jamestown. He also donated land for the First Methodist, Swedish Methodist, First Congregational, and First Baptist Churches in Jamestown.

Foote was also a local historian, in which many of his papers contributed to Andrew W. Young's 1875 History of Chautauqua County, New York From Its First Settlement to the Present Time.

=== Later life ===
After his first wife died in 1840, he married Amelia Stiles Leavitt Jenkins. She was the daughter of Jonathan Leavitt and granddaughter of Ezra Stiles. In 1845, they moved from Jamestown to New Haven, Connecticut. He died there in 1877 and was buried in Lake View Cemetery in Jamestown, New York.

=== Electoral history ===
1826 New York State Assembly election
Party	Candidate	Votes	%
Clintonian	Samuel A. Brown	1,696	24.85%
Bucktail	Elial T. Foote	2,312	33.88%
Bucktail	Nathan Mixer	1,619	23.73%
Clintonian	Philo Orton	1,197	17.54%
