= Nathaniel Gray =

American politician

New York State Assembly
- In office January 1, 1833 – December 31, 1833
- Preceded by: Theron Bly; Squire White
- Succeeded by: James Hall; Thomas Osborne

Town of Sheridan Supervisor

Personal details
- Born: November 7, 1795 Duanesburg, New York
- Died: January 1872 (aged 76) Forestville, New York
- Party: Anti-Masonic
- Occupation: Politician

Nathaniel Gray (November 7, 1795 – January 1872) was an American politician. He was a founder and Town Supervisor of Sheridan, New York (1831, 1835, and 1838). He served one term in the New York State Assembly (1833), representing Chautauqua County, New York.

== Biography ==
Nathaniel Gray was born on November 7, 1795, in Duanesburg, New York, a son of John Gray and Diantha Burritt Gray. The family later moved to Sherburne, New York when Gray was young. He was a brother to physicians John Franklin Gray (1804–1882), Alfred W. Gray (1802–1873), and Patrick Wells Gray (1806–1882). Their father, John Gray (1769–1859), served as a captain in Col. Samuel Whiting's 4th regiment of the Connecticut Militia during the American Revolutionary War. He later became the first Judge of the Court of Common Pleas for Chenango County, New York, holding this position until 1819, when the family relocated to Chautauqua County, New York, in the area that later became the Town of Sheridan, New York.

Gray was one of the founders of Sheridan. Prior to the establishment of the town, he built a tannery in 1820 with Enoch Haskins. This was later sold to Perry Gifford. In 1827, he along with John Griswald and Haven Brigham went to Albany to petition the creation of the town. Gray was the one who named the town. Upon the establishment of the town, he was among the first Inspectors of Schools in 1827. He later served as Town Supervisor in 1831, 1835, and 1838.

In 1832, he ran for New York State Assembly with Alvin Plumb on the Anti-Masonic ticket, running against Democrats ALbert Camp and Robert Woodside. Gray and Plumb were elected and served in the 56th New York State Legislature in 1833, representing Chautauqua County. Gray was a Supervisor of the Poor for Chautauqua County in 1836.

Gray was married to Harriet Dewey. Later in life, Gray left Sheridan and lived in Silver Creek and then Forestville. He died in January 1872 in Forestville and was buried in Glenwood Cemetery in Silver Creek.

== Electoral history ==
1832 New York State Assembly election
Party	Candidate	Votes	%
Anti-Masonic	Alvin Plumb		
Anti-Masonic	Nathaniel Gray		
Democratic	Albert Camp		
Democratic	Robert Woodside		
