= Edith Ainge =

American suffragist

Edith M. Ainge
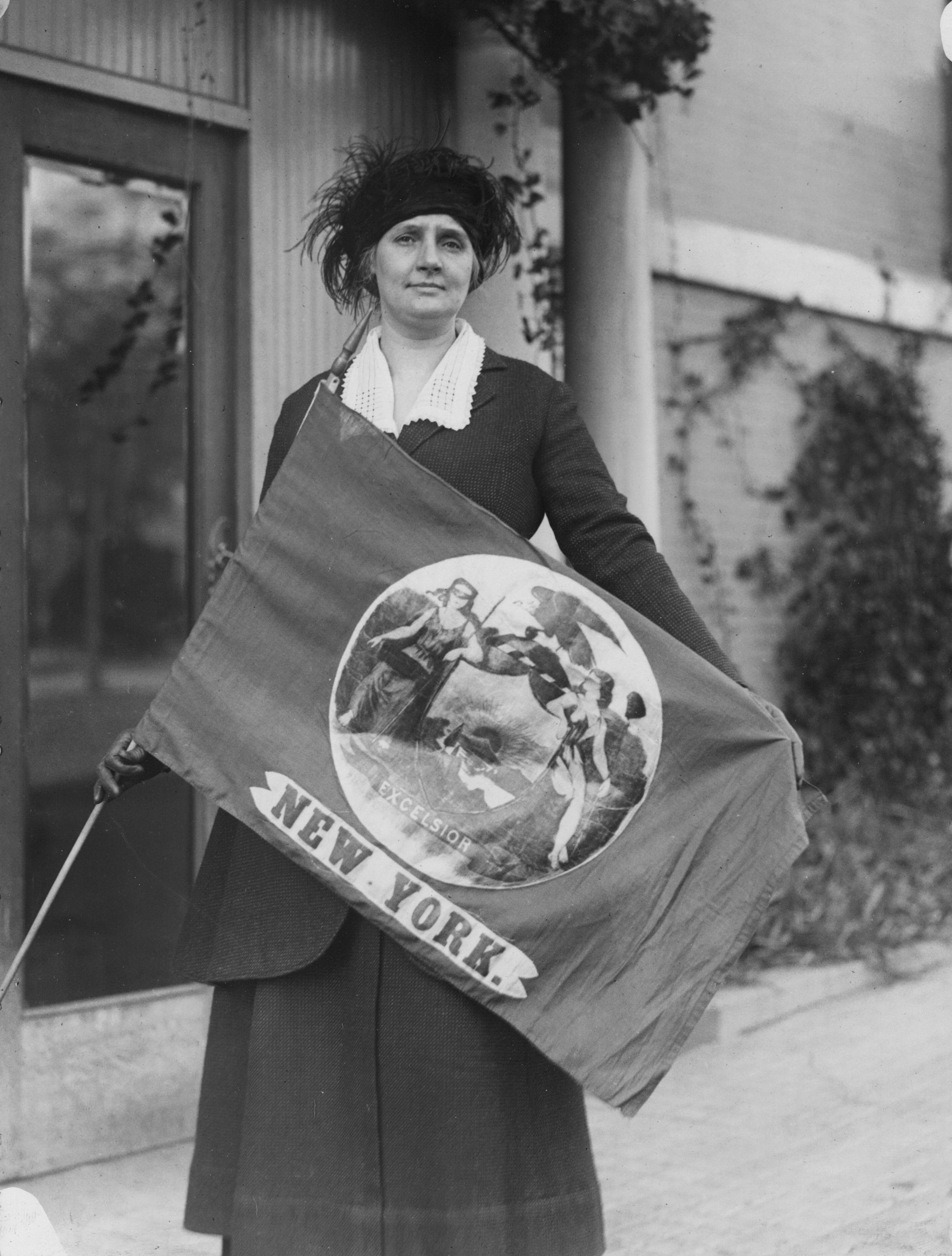
- Born: Mary E. Ainge; 1873
- Died: 1948
- Other names: Aingy
- Known for: Suffragist

Edith M. Ainge (1873–1948) was an American suffragist and a member of the activist group the Silent Sentinels. Ainge joined the National Woman's Party (NWP) led by Alice Paul to advocate for women's right to vote in the United States, which was established with the ratification of the 19th amendment in 1920. Ainge was arrested approximately five times from September 1917 to January 1919 for "unlawful assembly" (obstructing traffic) at NWP protests, and she later served as treasurer of the NWP.

== Suffrage in New York ==
Ainge worked for the women's suffrage movement in New York state in 1915. She spearheaded participation in The Torch of Liberty event where suffragists from New York, New Jersey, and Pennsylvania—organizing events to gather more participation and awareness about the cause, and to raise funding for the suffragist movement and for the political rallies.

== Night of Terror ==
Following her work on New York State Suffrage, Ainge moved to New York to rally for National voting rights for women. On November 10, 1917 suffragists Edith Ainge and Eleanor Calnan were two of thirty three arrested after stationing themselves in protest in front of the White House in Washington D.C. The protest was peaceful, and 68 suffragists demonstrated for the passage of the 19th Amendment. Ainge and Calnan carried a sign that read, “How Long Must Woman Be Denied a Voice in a Government Which is Conscripting Their Sons.” Ainge, and other suffragists were sentenced to 60 days in jail at the Occoquan Workhouse in Lorton, Virginia for obstructing traffic, referred to as "Unlawful Assembly.” Ainge was given solitary confinement, many of those arrested were tortured, and the event has been named the "Night of Terror."

== 1918 arrest ==
Ainge was again arrested for demonstrating in Lafayette Square on August 15, 1918.

== Watch Fire Demonstration, 1919 ==
At the Watch Fire Demonstrations, in Lafayette Square, members of the NWP burned copies of President Woodrow Wilson's speeches in urns. Ainge was the first to light her urn. The women, including Ainge were again arrested.

== Personal life ==
Ainge was born in England and emigrated to the U.S. as a child in 1884. Her parents William and Susan Ainge had a total of ten children.

Ainge was buried in Lake View Cemetery in Jamestown, New York.
