= Walter Cole =

American politician (??–??)

Walter Cole was an American politician from New York.

He was a member of the New York State Assembly, representing Jefferson County in 1823 and in 1831.
