= Henri Le Fevre Brown =

Medal of Honor recipient

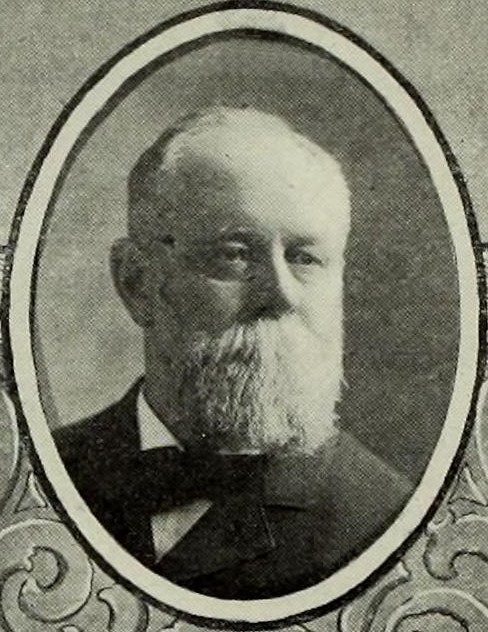
- Born: May 30, 1842; Jamestown, New York
- Died: April 29, 1910 (aged 67); Jamestown, New York
- Burial place: Lake View Cemetery
- Military career
- Allegiance: United States of America
- Branch: United States Army; Union Army
- Rank: Sergeant
- Unit: (New York (state)) 72nd Regiment New York Volunteer Infantry - Company G
- Conflicts: Battle of the Wilderness
- Awards: Medal of Honor

Sergeant Henri Le Fevre Brown (May 30, 1842 – April 29, 1910) was an American soldier who fought in the American Civil War. Brown received the country's highest award for bravery during combat, the Medal of Honor, for his action during the Battle of the Wilderness in Virginia on 6 May 1864. He was honored with the award on 23 June 1896.

== Biography ==
Brown was born in Jamestown, New York on 30 May 1842 and enlisted into the Company G, 72nd New York Volunteer Infantry at Ellicott, New York on 23 July 1861. He served in this company until 23 June 1864 when he was transferred to the 120th New York Infantry. It was while still enlisted in the 72nd Volunteer Infantry that Brown would perform the act of gallantry that earned him the Medal of Honor. He mustered out of the army on 3 June 1865, at the conclusion of the war.

After the war, Brown worked for the railway mail service. In 1902, he published a book, The History of the Third Regiment, Excelsior Brigade, 72nd New York Volunteer Infantry. Brown died on 29 April 1910 in Jamestown and his remains are interred at the Lake View Cemetery in New York.

== Medal of Honor citation ==
Voluntarily and under a heavy fire from the enemy, 3 times crossed the field of battle with a load of ammunition in a blanket on his back, thus supplying the Federal forces, whose ammunition had nearly all been expended, and enabling them to hold their position until reinforcement arrived, when the enemy were driven from their position.

== See also ==
- List of American Civil War Medal of Honor recipients: A–F
