= Staley N. Clarke =

American politician (1794-1860)

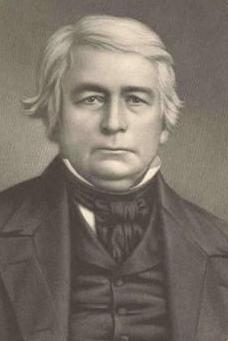

Member of the U.S. House of Representatives from New York's 31st district
- In office March 4, 1841 – March 3, 1843
- Preceded by: Richard P. Marvin
- Succeeded by: Asher Tyler

Personal details
- Born: May 24, 1794 Prince George's County, Maryland
- Died: October 14, 1860 (aged 66) Ellicottville, New York
- Party: Whig

Staley Nichols Clarke (May 24, 1794 – October 14, 1860) was a U.S. Representative from New York, brother of Archibald Smith Clarke.

Born in Prince George's County, Maryland, Clarke moved to Buffalo, New York, in 1815. He was employed as a clerk in the Bank of Niagara. He served as clerk in the office of the Holland Land Co., Batavia, New York, from 1819 to January 1822, when he was transferred as their agent for the county of Cattaraugus to Ellicottville, New York. Elected Treasurer of Cattaraugus County in 1824 and served until 1841.

Clarke was elected as a Whig to the Twenty-seventh Congress (March 4, 1841 – March 3, 1843). He declined to be a candidate for renomination in 1842. He died in Ellicottville, New York, October 14, 1860. He was interred in Jefferson Street Cemetery, but then reinterred at Forest Lawn Cemetery in Buffalo.

His brother Archibald S. Clarke also served as a Congressman from New York.

U.S. House of Representatives
Preceded by Richard P. Marvin	Member of the U.S. House of Representatives from New York's 31st congressional district 1841–1843	Succeeded by Asher Tyler
