= Zattu Cushing =

American shipbuilder and judge (1771–1839)

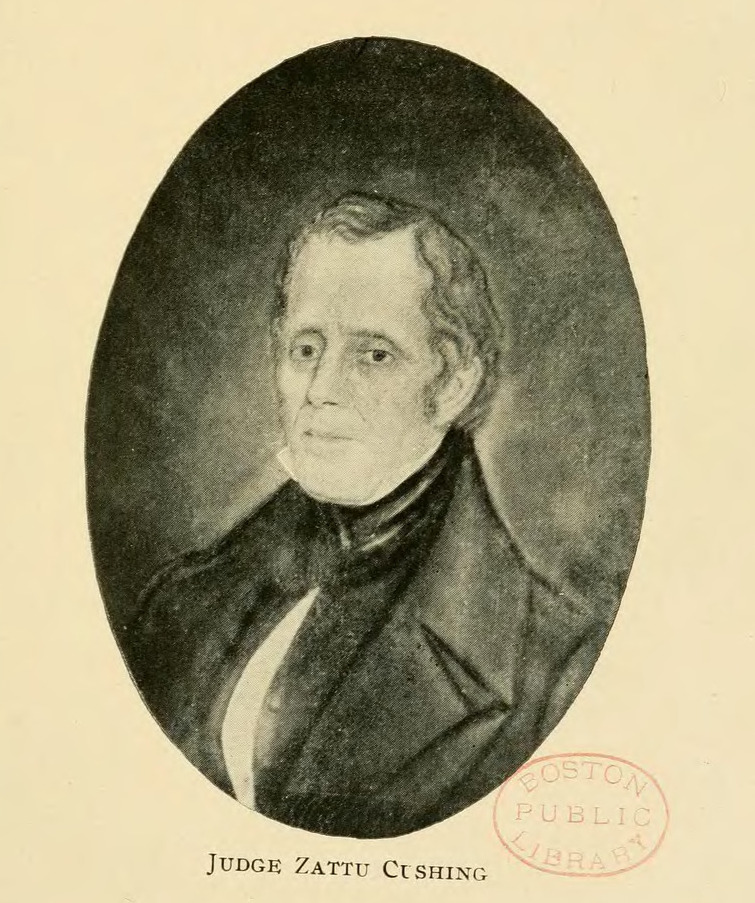

Judge of Chautauqua County, New York
- In office 1811–1824
- Preceded by: Position Established
- Succeeded by: Elial T. Foote

Personal details
- Born: June 11, 1771 Plymouth, Massachusetts
- Died: January 1, 1839 (aged 67)
- Occupation: Judge, shipbuilder, farmer

Zattu Cushing (June 11, 1771—January 11, 1839) was an American shipbuilder and judge. He was the first settler of Fredonia, New York and the first judge of Chautauqua County, New York (1811―1824).

== Biography ==
Cushing was born on June 11, 1771, in Plymouth, Massachusetts. He was the son of Nathaniel Cushing, a shipbuilder, and his wife Lydia Cooke. He worked at a shipyard in Boston. At age 21, he moved to Saratoga County, New York and became a farmer, later moving to Paris Hill on Oneida County, New York. He married Rachel Buckingham. Cushing visited western New York before he settled, purchasing a 306-acre tract of land from the Holland Land Company in what is now the center of Fredonia, New York. He sold his property in New England and brought his family to Western New York in 1805. He purchased an additional 557 acres and built a log cabin. His wife Rachel died in 1816 and he married secondly to Eunice Elderkin.

In 1811, Chautauqua County was formed, and he was appointed first judge of the county, and held that office until 1824. In 1821, Chautauqua County Agricultural Society was established and Cushing was its first President. Cushing died on January 11, 1839, at the age of 67.

=== Family ===
Cushing is the grandfather of brothers William B. Cushing and Alonzo Cushing.

== See also ==
- Boston Brahmins § Cushing
