= Asher Tyler =

American politician

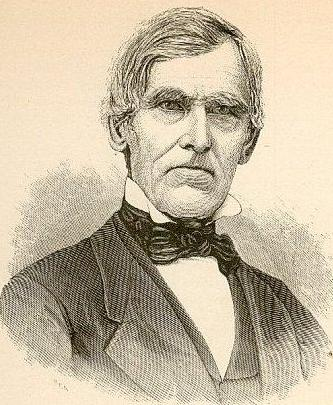
- Asher Tyler, Congressman from New York

Member of the U.S. House of Representatives from New York's 31st district
- In office March 4, 1843 – March 3, 1845
- Preceded by: Staley N. Clarke
- Succeeded by: Abner Lewis

Personal details
- Born: May 10, 1798 Bridgewater, New York, US
- Died: August 1, 1875 (aged 77) Elmira, New York, US
- Party: Whig

Asher Tyler (May 10, 1798 – August 1, 1875) was a United States representative from New York. Born in Bridgewater, Oneida County, he was graduated from Hamilton College in 1817, studied law, was admitted to the bar and commenced practice in Ellicottville, Cattaraugus County in 1836. He was an agent of the Devereaux Land Co., with headquarters at Ellicottville, and subsequently served in a like capacity for the Erie Co. He held several local offices and was elected as a Whig to the Twenty-eighth Congress, holding office from March 4, 1843, to March 3, 1845. He moved to Elmira in 1846 and engaged in railroad operations. Tyler was one of the incorporators of the Elmira Rolling Mill Co., and in 1875 died in Elmira. Interment was in Woodlawn Cemetery.

U.S. House of Representatives
Preceded by Staley N. Clarke	Member of the U.S. House of Representatives from New York's 31st congressional district 1843–1845	Succeeded by Abner Lewis
