= Calvin Rumsey =

American politician (1793–1854)

Member of the New York State Assembly
- In office January 1, 1837 – December 31, 1837
- Preceded by: Thomas B. Campbell; Richard P. Marvin
- Succeeded by: Thomas I. Allen; George A. French; Abner Lewis

Personal details
- Born: February 24, 1793 Hubbardton, Vermont, U.S.
- Died: March 19, 1854 (aged 61) U.S.
- Resting place: U.S.
- Party: Whig
- Occupation: Politician

Calvin Rumsey (February 24, 1793–March 19, 1854) was an American politician. He was a member of the New York State Assembly in 1837.

== Biography ==
Rumsey was born on February 24, 1793, a son of David and Hannah (Bronson) Rumsey. In 1814, he moved to Warsaw, New York, where he married Polly McWharter. They had eight children. In 1833, they moved to Buffalo and then to Westfield, New York, in 1834, where he operated a tannery with his brothers Stephen and Aaron.

He served in the 60th New York State Legislature, representing Chautauqua County, New York, alongside Alvin Plumb and William Wilcox. In 1840, he was appointed postmaster for Westfield. Rumsey died in Randolph, New York on March 19, 1854 at the age of 61.

== Electoral history ==
1836 New York State Assembly election
Party	Candidate	Votes	%
Anti-Masonic	Alvin Plumb		
Anti-Masonic	Calvin Rumsey		
Anti-Masonic	William Wilcox		
Democratic	Thomas B. Campbell		
Democratic	James Hall		
Democratic	Daniel Parsons		
