= Alvin Plumb =

American politician

New York State Assembly
- In office January 1, 1833 – December 31, 1833
- Preceded by: Theron Bly; Squire White
- Succeeded by: James Hall; Thomas Osborne

New York State Assembly
- In office January 1, 1837 – December 31, 1837
- Preceded by: Thomas B. Campbell; Richard P. Marvin
- Succeeded by: Thomas I. Allen; George A. French; Abner Lewis

Personal details
- Born: September 6, 1802 Paris, New York
- Died: May 13, 1877 (aged 74)
- Party: Anti-Jacksonian
- Occupation: Politician

Alvin Plumb (September 6, 1802 – May 13, 1877) was an American businessman and politician. He served two terms in the New York State Assembly (1833, 1836), representing Chautauqua County, New York. He built the first steamship to navigate Chautauqua Lake.

== Biography ==
=== Early life and career ===
Plumb was born on September 6, 1802, in Paris, New York. He went with his brothers, Joseph, and Ralph, to Fredonia, Chautauqua County in 1816. Starting in 1820, he served as a clerk in stores in Rochester and Geneva, attending school at the academy in Geneva. He then conducted business as a merchant in Jamestown and was a manufacturer of pearl ashes starting in 1824 and then in Mayville beginning in 1825. He sold his store in Jamestown in 1831 to Charles R. Harvey. He was also involved in the milling business in the area.

Plumb was among those who proposed a steamship be built to run on Chautauqua Lake. He formed a company, Chautauqua Steamboat Company, in 1827 and the first steamboat, named Chautauqua was launched in 1828, making its first trip to Mayville on July 4, 1828.

In 1831, he was among those who helped established the first bank in Jamestown, the Chautauqua County Bank.

He married Mary Ann Davis in 1832 and they had three children, including Elizabeth, Arthur, and Samuel. He died on May 13, 1877 at the age of 74.

=== Politics ===
Plumb was associated with the Anti-Masonic Party and served as secretary of their convention in 1827.

He served in the 56th New York State Legislature in 1833 alongside Nathaniel Gray, representing Chautauqua County. He served again in the 60th New York State Legislature in 1837. In 1838, he was among the Chautauqua County delegates to the Whig State Convention.

Plumb was appointed Postmaster for Jamestown on June 8, 1841, in which he had to resign when he was elected County Clerk, serving until December 5, 1843. He served 3 terms as clerk. He served as Town Supervisor for Westfield in 1848 and 1852.

=== Later life ===
After his service as clerk, Plumb lived in Westfield. Plumb was a supporter of the temperance movement and an abolitionist. On August 4, 1871, the steamboat Chautauqua was to land at Mayville when the boiler exploded and killed 8 people. Plumb was severely injured.

Plumb died on May 13, 1877 at the age of 74.

== Electoral history ==
1832 New York State Assembly election
| Party | Candidate | Votes | % |
|---|---|---|---|
| Anti-Masonic | Alvin Plumb | | |
| Anti-Masonic | Nathaniel Gray | | |
| Democratic | Albert Camp | | |
| Democratic | Robert Woodside | | |

1836 New York State Assembly election
| Party | Candidate | Votes | % |
|---|---|---|---|
| Anti-Masonic | Alvin Plumb | | |
| Anti-Masonic | Calvin Rumsey | | |
| Anti-Masonic | William Wilcox | | |
| Democratic | Thomas B. Campbell | | |
| Democratic | James Hall | | |
| Democratic | Daniel Parsons | | |
