= Philo Orton (New York politician) =

American politician and judge (1778–1856)

Member of the New York State Assembly
- In office July 1, 1817 – July 1, 1819
- Preceded by: Jediah Prendergast; Richard Smith
- Succeeded by: Elial T. Foote; Oliver Forward

Pomfret Town Supervisor
- In office 1811–1817
- Preceded by: Position Established
- Succeeded by: Leverett Barker

Personal details
- Born: September 9, 1778 Tyringham, Massachusetts
- Died: August 12, 1856 (aged 77) Pomfret, New York
- Resting place: West Main Street Cemetery; West Pomfret, New York
- Parent(s): Dr. Thomas Orton; Sarah Atwood
- Occupation: Politician, judge

Philo Orton (September 9, 1778 – August 12, 1856) was an American politician and judge. He served as Supervisor of the Town of Pomfret (1809–1818), an associate judge of the Court of Common Pleas of Chautauqua County, New York (1811), and a member of the New York State Assembly (1818–1819).

== Biography ==
Orton was born on September 9, 1778, in Tyringham, Massachusetts, a son of Dr. Thomas and Sarah (Atwood) Orton. He lived in Augusta, New York before moving to Canadaway in Chautauqua County (now the Town of Pomfret), purchasing land there 1806 and had a farm and also worked as a surveyor.

In 1809, Orton was elected the first Supervisor of the Town of Pomfret, in which he also served on the Board of Supervisors for Niagara County at first, when Chautauqua County was governed by Niagara County, and then as a member of the Board of Supervisors for Chautauqua County once Chautauqua County was founded in 1811. Orton was also one of the first associate judges of Chautauqua County, along with Matthew Prendergast, Jonathan Thompson, and William Alexander, who were elected in April 1811. In 1813, he served as Chairman of the Chautauqua County Board of Supervisors.

Orton was elected to the New York State Assembly, serving in the 41st and 42nd New York State Legislatures from July 1, 1817, to July 1, 1819, and representing Chautauqua, Cattaraugus, and Niagara Counties, succeeding Robert Fleming. He served alongside Isaac Phelps, as the district had 2 seats. In 1832 and 1840, he was a Presidential elector, and when William Henry Harrison was elected, Orton was one of the 42 electors.

Orton was married to Irene Hurd in 1802 and had three sons: Thomas, Abiram, and Charles. After Irene's death, Orton married Clarissa Sage in 1818. His brother, Thomas, is the grandfather of Philo A. Orton, a Wisconsin politician.

== Electoral history ==
1826 New York State Assembly election
| Party | Candidate | Votes | % |
|---|---|---|---|
| Clintonian | Samuel A. Brown | 1,696 | 24.85% |
| Bucktail | Elial T. Foote | 2,312 | 33.88% |
| Bucktail | Nathan Mixer | 1,619 | 23.73% |
| Clintonian | Philo Orton | 1,197 | 17.54% |
