= Robert Fleming (New York politician) =

American lawyer and politician

Member of the New York State Assembly
- In office July 1, 1817 – June 30, 1818
- Preceded by: Philo Orton
- Succeeded by: Philo Orton

Judge of Niagara County, New York
- In office 1828–1833
- Preceded by: Silas Hopkins
- Succeeded by: Nathan Dayton

Personal details
- Occupation: Politician

Robert Fleming was an American lawyer, politician, and judge. He served two terms in the New York State Assembly (1817—1818; 1834) and as Judge of Niagara County, New York (1828—1833).

== Biography ==
Fleming was elected to the 41st New York State Legislature, serving from July 1, 1817 to June 30, 1818 alongside Isaac Phelps and representing Niagara, Cattaraugus, and Chautauqua Counties. In 1821, Fleming became a puisne judge of Niagara County, New York. After Lockport became the county seat of Niagara County in 1822 and Fleming was among the First Circuit Court Judges who served in 1823. He was subsequently Judge of Niagara County from 1828 to 1833. Fleming served in New York State Assembly a second time, in the 57th New York State Legislature from January 1, 1834 to December 31, 1834.

=== Little Yellow House ===
Starting in 1818, Fleming owned the house known as the Little Yellow House in Lewiston, New York and used it as a law office. The family owned the home until 1915.
