= David Eason =

American politician, judge and sheriff (1771–1853)

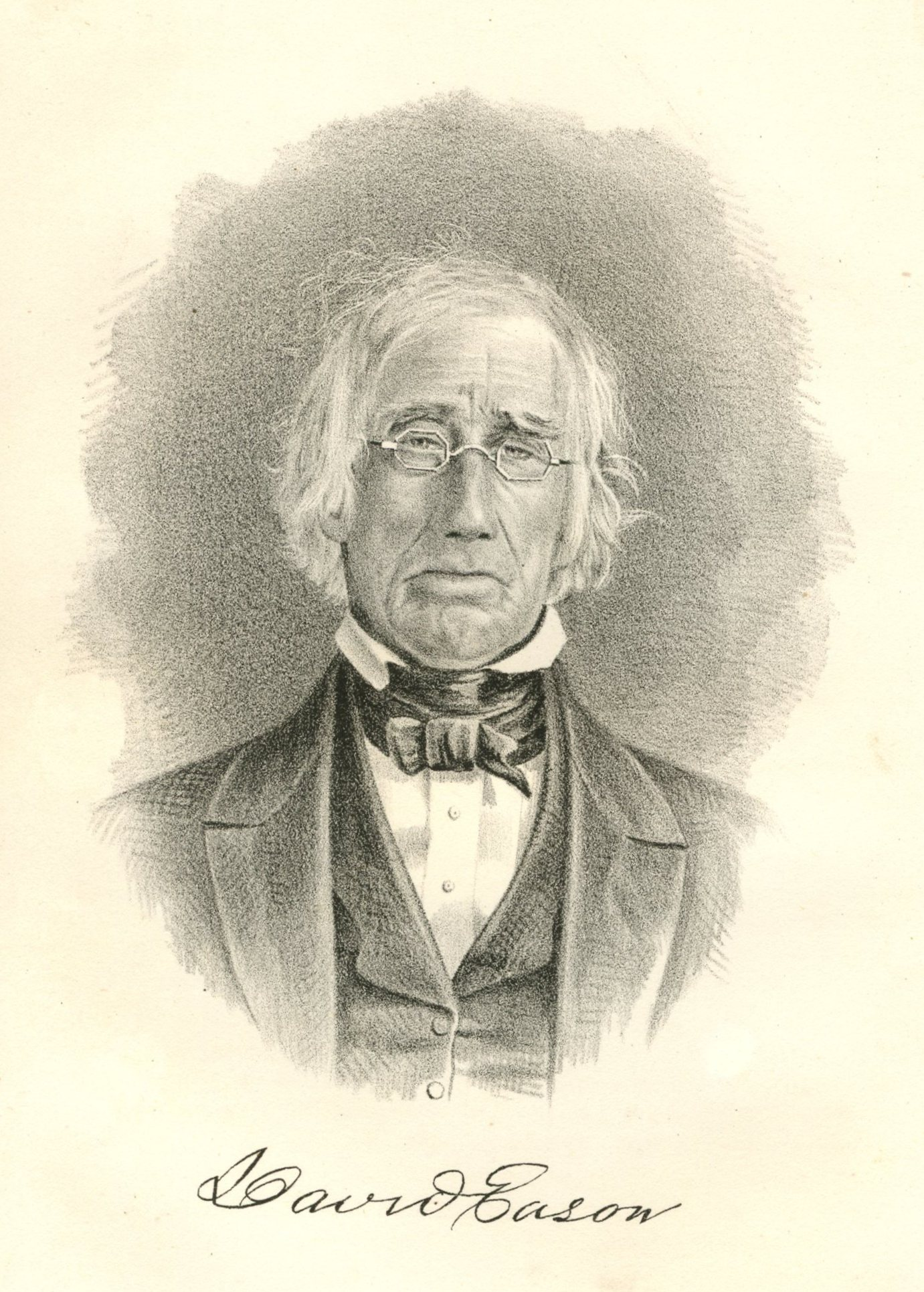

1st Sheriff Chautauqua County, New York
- In office February 9, 1811 – 1814
- Preceded by: Position Established
- Succeeded by: Jonathan Sprague

New York State Assembly
- In office July 1, 1821 – January 5, 1822
- Preceded by: William Hotchkiss; Jediah Prendergast
- Succeeded by: Isaac Phelps

New York State Senate 8th District
- In office January 1, 1823 – December 31, 1824
- Preceded by: Districted Created
- Succeeded by: Samuel Wilkeson

Personal details
- Born: April 3, 1771
- Died: April 8, 1853 (aged 82)
- Occupation: Politician

David Eason (April 3, 1771 – April 8, 1853) was an American politician, judge, sheriff, and early settler of Chautauqua County, New York. He was the county's first sheriff (1811–1814) and served in both the New York State Assembly (1821–1822) and New York State Senate (1822–1823).

== Biography ==
Eason was born on April 3, 1771, and was from Northampton County, Pennsylvania, and was an early settler of Chautauqua County, New York. He first settled in Canadaway (now Fredonia) in the summer of 1803 and built the first home, a log house, in the village on the bank of the creek. In the spring of 1805, he married Margaret Woodside. In 1806, Eason was elected a Fence Viewer along with George Whitehill and Basil Burgess of the Town of Canadaway. Eason, along with Perry G. Ellsworth, were the first two commissioner justices in 1806.

Eason sold his farm to Hezekiah Tower in the winter of 1806–1807 and moved to nearby Westfield and purchased land from John McMahan, who had originally purchased a large tract of land from the Holland Land Company in January 1807. Eason purchased additional land in April 1810 and February 1811.

In 1811, Chautauqua County formed is own government, and Eason became the county's first sheriff. In 1818, Summit Lodge No. 312 of Free and Accepted Masons was formed in Mayville in 1818, and Eason became its first treasurer. The lodge disbanded in 1824.

Eason was a member of the Democratic-Republican Party and was elected to the New York State Assembly and served in the 45th New York State Legislature from July 1, 1821, to January 5, 1822. The election was contested by Isaac Phelps. Eason received 2,226 votes and Isaac Phelps, Junior received 2,275 votes and "Isaac Phelps" received 178 votes, for a combined total of 2,453 for Phelps. It was ruled that Phelps was the winner of the election, and was seated on January 5, 1822.

Eason was elected to a two-year term in the New York State Senate and served in the 46th and 47th New York State Legislatures from January 1, 1823, to December 31, 1824, representing the 8th District.

Eason died on April 8, 1853.

== Electoral history ==
1821 New York State Assembly election
| Party | Candidate | Votes | % |
|---|---|---|---|
| Democratic-Republican | David Eason | 2,426 | |
| Democratic-Republican | Isaac Phelps | 2,453 | |
