= George A. French (New York politician) =

American merchant and politician (1798–1865)

Member of the New York State Assembly
- In office January 1, 1837 – December 31, 1837
- Preceded by: Alvin Plumb; Calvin Rumsey; William Wilcox
- Succeeded by: Waterman Ellsworth; Timothy Judson; Abner Lewis

Member of the New York State Assembly
- In office January 1, 1840 – December 31, 1841
- Preceded by: Waterman Ellsworth; Timothy Judson; Abner Lewis
- Succeeded by: Rossiter P. Johnson; Austin Pierce; Emory F. Warren

Personal details
- Born: August 1798 Massachusetts, U.S.
- Died: January 29, 1865 (aged 66) Fredonia, New York, U.S.
- Resting place: Forest Hill Cemetery, Fredonia, U.S.
- Party: Whig
- Spouse(s): Sophia Risley; Sally (Hudson) Day; Sarah A. Stillman
- Children: 4
- Parent(s): Asa and Jane French
- Occupation: Merchant, politician

George A. French (August 1798 – January 29, 1865) was an American merchant and politician from Chautauqua County, New York. He was a merchant in Dunkirk and represented the county in the New York State Assembly during the late 1830s and early 1840s.

== Biography ==
=== Early life and career ===
George A. French was born in Massachusetts in August 1798, the son of Asa and Jane French. The family moved to Fredonia, New York, by 1810. His mother died in 1813, and his father later remarried. Asa French worked as a blacksmith in Fredonia before moving to nearby Sheridan, where George took over part of his father’s land in the early 1820s.

In 1824, French partnered with Walter Smith to open a store in Sinclairville. Two years later, they expanded to Dunkirk. In 1825, Baptist minister Joy Handy joined the firm, creating the partnership of French, Handy & Co., which dissolved in 1828.

French’s property holdings in Dunkirk included several lots on Front Street and Buffalo Street. He was active in civic affairs, helping organize the Dunkirk Academy in 1835 and joining the Dunkirk Presbyterian Church in 1834.

=== Politics ===
From 1830 to 1833, French served as Supervisor of the Town of Pomfret, New York, and in 1832 he was Chairman of the Board of Supervisors of Chautauqua County, New York.

French represented Chautauqua County in the New York State Assembly for three non-consecutive terms. He served in the 61st New York State Legislature in 1837, alongside Thomas I. Allen and Abner Lewis. He returned for the 63rd New York State Legislature in 1840, with Odin Benedict and William Rice, and served again in the 64th New York State Legislature in 1841, with Benjamin Douglass and Robertson Whiteside.

French was also associated with anti-slavery activity in Chautauqua County. In 1851, abolitionist Silas Shearman of Jamestown contacted him for assistance in retrieving a recaptured refugee. Contemporary accounts described French as “a prominent and zealous Abolitionist.”

=== Personal life and death ===
He married three times: first to Sophia Risley, who died in 1831; then to Sally (Hudson) Day in 1832, who died in 1851; and finally to Sarah A. Stillman in 1852. Records suggest that he had at least four children, including Delia (who married Silas Seymour), Francis A. French, Walter S. French, and Ann.

French died in Fredonia on January 29, 1865, and was buried in Forest Hill Cemetery.
