= Odin Benedict =

American physician, banker and politician

Member of the New York State Assembly
- In office January 1, 1840 – December 31, 1840
- Preceded by: Waterman Ellsworth; Timothy Judson; Abner Lewis
- Succeeded by: Benjamin Douglass; George A. French; Robertson Whiteside

Member of the New York State Assembly
- In office January 1, 1843 – December 31, 1843
- Preceded by: Rossiter P. Johnson; Austin Pierce; Emory F. Warren
- Succeeded by: Forbes Johnson; Marcius Simons; Elijah Waters

Personal details
- Born: August 20, 1805 Skaneateles, New York
- Died: March 11, 1874 (aged 68) Dunkirk, New York
- Party: Whig
- Occupation: Politician

Odin Benedict (August 20, 1805—March 11, 1874) was an American medical doctor, banker, and politician from Chautauqua County, New York. He was supervisor of the Town of Ellery, New York and 10-time chairman of the county Board of Supervisors. He represented the county in the New York State Assembly for two terms, in 1840 and 1843.

== Biography ==
=== Early life and career ===
Benedict was born on August 20, 1805, in Skaneateles, Onondaga County, New York, a son of Dr. Isaac Benedict. His father was a surgeon, and served during the War of 1812, and died in 1814. Benedict practice medine in Skaneateles and graduated from Fairfield Medical College. He was licensed by the Herkimer County Medical College in January 1826. In the same year, he moved to Ellery, New York and was the town's first physician. He continued his practice until 1850. He married Sally Ann Copp and had a son, William, who served as town supervisor for nine years.

=== Politics ===
Benedict served as a supervisor of the Town of Ellery for 14 years, beginning in 1833. He was elected chairman of the Chautauqua County Board of Supervisors in 1834, 1836, 1838. He also served as postmaster for Ellery for 20 years.

In 1839, he was elected to the New York State Assembly representing Chautauqua County in the 63rd New York State Legislature in 1840 alongside George A. French and William Rice. After this term, he once again served as chairman of the Chautauqua County Board of Supervisors from 1841 to 1842.

Benedict returned to the state legislature, and was elected again in 1842, serving in the 66th New York State Legislature in 1843 alongside Adolphus S. Morrison and Emory F. Warren. Benedict was once again elected as chairman of the Chautauqua County Board of Supervisors from 1845 to 1847 and again in 1849.

=== Later life ===
In 1850, Benedict closed his medical practice in Ellery and moved to Ann Arbor, Michigan. There he started a government stock bank. He returned to Chautauqua County in September 1851, and was in the banking business in Dunkirk. He resumed his medical practice until his death on March 11, 1874, in Dunkirk.
