= Walter C. Gifford =

American politician

Walter Cornell Gifford (May 8, 1829 – August 9, 1909) was an American farmer and politician from New York.

== Life ==
Gifford was born on May 8, 1829, in Busti, New York, the son of Gideon Gifford and Millicent Cornell. He was a descendant of Robert Cushman, who played a key role in securing the charter for the Plymouth Colony.

Gifford worked as a farmer in Jamestown. He was initially a member of the Whig Party, but became a Republican after the later party was organized. He was secretary of the Chautauqua Patrons' Relief Association, secretary of the Central New York Co-operative Fire Insurance Association, and president of the Farmer's Board of Trade. He was also heavily involved in the New York State Grange. He served as Secretary and Master of the Jamestown Grange, and Master and County Deputy of the Chautauqua County Grange. He served as Assistant Steward of the State Grange from 1880 to 1884, Overseer of the State Grange from 1884 to 1890, and Master of the State Grange from 1890 to 1894.

In 1890, Gifford was elected to the New York State Assembly as a Republican, representing the Chautauqua County 1st District. He served in the Assembly in 1891 and 1892. While in the Assembly, he introduced a bill that gave women the right to vote for school commissioner, and another that regulated the sale of cocaine.

In 1852, Gifford married Eliza C. Robertson. Their three surviving children were Clarence E., Millicent C., and Alice B. Eliza was a prominent member of the State Grange in her own right. She was heavily involved in the women's suffrage and temperance movement. When her husband was master of the State Grange, she introduced the first women's suffrage resolution in the National Grange. She wrote a memorial in favor of women's suffrage that was adopted by the State Grange and was submitted to the 1894 New York Constitutional Convention. She was also an active member of the Woman's Christian Temperance Union.

Gifford died at home on August 9, 1909. He was buried in Lake View Cemetery in Jamestown.

New York State Assembly
Preceded by S. Frederick Nixon	New York State Assembly; Chautauqua County, 1st District; 1891-1892	Succeeded by District Abolished
