= McClurg Museum =

Coordinates: 42.3214°N 79.5769°W

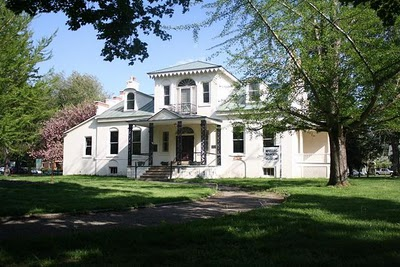
- Established: 1951
- Location: Moore Park, Westfield, New York
- Curator: John Paul Wolfe
- Website: http://mcclurgmuseum.org/

The McClurg Museum is a renovated mansion in Westfield, New York that serves as the home of the Chautauqua County Historical Society. It is a volunteer-run museum containing various artifacts collected by the historical society along with an extensive library and photo collection. It is open to the public and local schools for educational purposes.

== History ==
The museum was initially a mansion built in 1818 by James McClurg, the son of a wealthy Pittsburgh industrialist. It is said McClurg baked the bricks, prepared the lumber and brought bricklayers from Pittsburgh to construct the building, which was dubbed by locals “McClurg’s Folly” because of its large rooms and high ceilings, which stood in high contrast to the crude log cabins around it.

For two years during its history, the mansion was the residence of William H. Seward - who would later become the 12th Governor of New York, a U.S. Senator, and Secretary of State under Abraham Lincoln and Andrew Johnson. From 1836 to 1838, Seward served as one of the owners and Land Agent for the newly established Chautauqua Land Company, after the agency negotiated acquisition of property and deeds from the Holland Land Company. This acquisition was an indirect result of the "Settlers Revolt" of 1836. While working to ease tensions with the local landowners, Seward made the mansion his home.

In 1950, the Chautauqua County Historical Society obtained a seventy-five year lease from the Village of Westfield to inhabit the mansion. The Society has since restored it and furnished it in nineteenth century style. It was placed on the National Register of Historic Places in 1984.

== Chautauqua County Historical Society ==
The McClurg Museum has been the home of Chautauqua County Historical Society since 1951. The Chautauqua County Historical Society was founded in 1883, making it one of the oldest societies in Western New York State. Since its inception, CCHS has been collecting and preserving the significant history of Chautauqua County, New York. Its mission is to foster an interest in and knowledge of the history of Chautauqua County through the collection, preservation and interpretation of objects and archives of local significance. The Research Library contains several important collections, including the Elial T. Foote collection, the Cushing family papers(Alonzo Cushing and William B. Cushing), the Albion W. Tourgée collection and the John O. Bowman photographic collection. Genealogists reference local history files, including family histories and Civil War documents.

The society maintains an active schedule. Members enjoy quarterly programs, special receptions, museum exhibits and a free subscription to TimeLines, the society's award-winning newsletter.
