= Abner Hazeltine =

American politician (1793–1879)

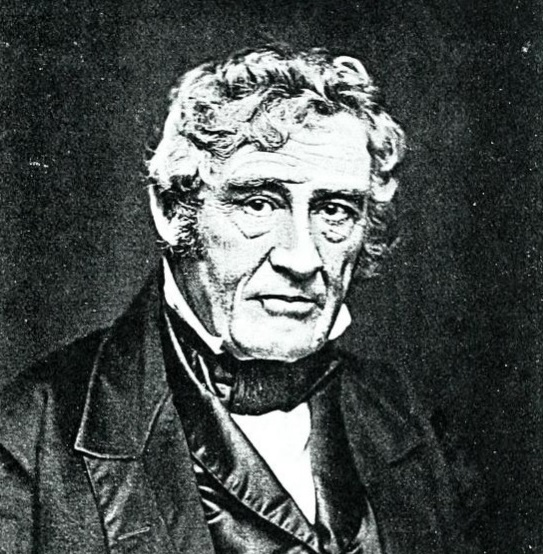

United States Commissioner of Courts for the Northern District of New York
- In office 1873–1879
- Preceded by: Gustavus A. Scroggs
- Succeeded by: Abner Hazeltine Jr.

Special Judge of the Chautauqua County, New York Court
- In office 1873–1874
- Preceded by: Philip S. Cottle
- Succeeded by: John J. Kinney

Judge of the Chautauqua County, New York Court
- In office 1859–1863
- Preceded by: Selden Marvin
- Succeeded by: Orsell Cook

District Attorney of Chataqua County, New York
- In office 1847–1850
- Preceded by: David Mann
- Succeeded by: Daniel Sherman

Member of the United States House of Representatives
- In office March 4, 1833 – March 3, 1837
- Preceded by: Position established
- Succeeded by: Richard P. Marvin
- Constituency: New York's 31st congressional district

Member of the New York State Assembly
- In office January 1, 1829 – December 31, 1830 Serving with Nathan Mixer (1829), Squire White (1830)
- Preceded by: Nathaniel Fenton, Nathan Mixer
- Succeeded by: Squire White, John Birdsall
- Constituency: Chautauqua County

Personal details
- Born: June 10, 1793 Wardsboro, Vermont, U.S.
- Died: December 20, 1879 (aged 86) Jamestown, New York, U.S.
- Resting place: Lake View Cemetery, Jamestown, New York, U.S.
- Party: Republican
- Other political affiliations: Anti-Masonic; Anti-Jacksonian; Whig
- Spouse(s): Polly Kidder (m. 1819); Matilda Hayward (m. 1834)
- Children: 7
- Education: Williams College
- Profession: Attorney

Abner Hazeltine (June 10, 1793 – December 20, 1879) was an attorney, politician, and judge from New York. In addition to a long career practicing law in Jamestown, he served as a member of the New York State Assembly, district attorney and judge of Chautauqua County, and a member of the United States House of Representatives. After attaining admission to the bar in 1819, he practiced continually for 60 years, and was still active when he died at age 86.

A native of Wardsboro, Vermont, Hazeltine attended the local schools, studied with a tutor, then began attendance at Williams College, from which he graduated in 1815. He settled in Jamestown, New York, where he was a founder of Jamestown Academy, where he taught for several years while he studied law with two local attorneys. After joining the bar, he resided briefly in Warren, Pennsylvania before returning to Jamestown.

Opposed to slavery, Hazeltine changed his party affiliation several times in the early to mid 1800s as the abolition movement grew, including joining the Anti-Masonic, Anti-Jacksonian, and Whig Parties. When the Republican Party was founded in the mid-1850s as the main anti-slavery party, Hazeltine became an early adherent.

Hazeltine served in legislative and judicial posts throughout his life. He was a member of the state Assembly for two terms, 1829 to 1830, and a member of the U.S. House for two terms, 1833 to 1837. He served as Chautauqua County's district attorney from 1847 to 1850. From 1859 to 1863, Hazeltine was judge of the Chautauqua County Court, and he was a special judge of the county court from 1873 to 1874. From 1873 until his death, Hazeltine served as U.S. Commissioner of Courts for the Northern District of New York. He died in Jamestown on December 20, 1879, and was buried at Lake View Cemetery in Jamestown.

== Early life ==
Hazeltine was born in Wardsboro, Vermont on June 10, 1793, the son of Daniel Hazeltine and Susannah (Jones) Hazeltine. Hazeltine attended the common schools of Wardsboro, and was tutored by the pastor of his church. He then attended Williams College, from which he graduated in 1815. He moved to Jamestown, New York in 1815, where he taught school and was a founder of the Jamestown Academy. He studied law with Jacob Houghton and Samuel A. Brown, was admitted to the bar in 1819 and commenced practice in Jamestown. He moved to Warren, Pennsylvania, and was the first lawyer in the county. He returned to Jamestown and resumed the practice of law in 1823. He was also an editorial writer on the Jamestown Journal from 1826 to 1829. In addition to practicing law, Hazeltine was also interested in several Jamestown-area businesses, including serving as a director of the Chautauqua County Bank. In the mid-1820s, he was among the Chautauqua County residents who advocated for construction of a canal that would connect the Erie Canal with the Allegheny River, thus creating a transportation route to Pittsburgh.

== Career ==
Hazeltine served as member of the New York State Assembly in 1829 and 1830. He was elected as an Anti-Masonic candidate to the Twenty-third Congress and reelected as an Anti-Jacksonian to the Twenty-fourth Congress (March 4, 1833 – March 3, 1837). He was not a candidate for renomination in 1836. Hazeltine was an advocate of temperance, and served a vice president of the Congressional Temperance Society. He was also an opponent of slavery, and opposed motions to ban anti-slavery petitions from being received by the House. He later became a Whig and he served as district attorney of Chautauqua County from 1847 to 1850.

When the Republican Party was founded in the mid-1850s, Hazeltine became an early member, and he served as judge of Chautauqua County from 1859 to 1863. During the American Civil War, he was appointed a state commissioner for overseeing the Union Army draft in Chautauqua County. He was appointed a special county judge of Chautauqua County in 1873 and served until 1874. Hazeltine served as United States Commissioner for the courts of the Northern District of New York from 1873 until his death.

== Death and burial ==
Hazeltine died in Jamestown on December 20, 1879. He was interred at Lake View Cemetery in Jamestown.

== Family ==
In 1819, Hazeltine was married Polly Kidder of Wardsboro. She died in 1832, and in 1834, he married Matilda Hayward. He was the father of four children with his first wife, and three with his second. Harriet worked as a Jamestown store cashier, and Lydia died in infancy. Charles was a career teacher, and Marvin was a member of the clergy. Lewis was a physician, Abner Jr. became an attorney, and Mary was the wife of Jamestown merchant De Forest Weld.

== Electoral history ==
1828 New York State Assembly election
Party	Candidate	Votes	%
Jacksonian	John McAlister	1,158	17.12%
Anti-Masonic	Abner Hazeltine	2,056	30.40%
Anti-Masonic	Nathan Mixer	2,091	30.92%
Jacksonian	James White	1,458	21.56%
Jacksonian	James Hall	1,091	
Jacksonian	John Crain	936	

1829 New York State Assembly election
Party	Candidate	Votes	%
Jacksonian	Horace Allen	1,835	21.25%
Anti-Masonic	Abner Hazeltine	2,461	28.50%
Anti-Masonic	Squire White	2,502	28.98%
Jacksonian	Benjamin Walworth	1,837	21.27%

1832 United States House of Representatives election
Party	Candidate	Votes	%
Jacksonian	Oliver Lee	4,946	44.11%
Anti-Masonic	Abner Hazeltine	6,266	55.89%

1834 United States House of Representatives election
Party	Candidate	Votes	%
Jacksonian	Alson E. Leavenworth	3,494	39.97%
Anti-Jacksonian	Abner Hazeltine	5,248	60.03%

U.S. House of Representatives
New district	Member of the U.S. House of Representatives from New York's 31st congressional district 1833–1837	Succeeded by Richard P. Marvin
