= Bucktails =

Faction of the Democratic-Republican party

The Bucktails (1818–1826) were the faction of the Democratic-Republican Party in the US state of New York opposed to Governor DeWitt Clinton. It was influenced by the Tammany Society. The name derives from a Tammany insignia, a deer's tail worn in the hat. The name was in use as early as 1791 when a bucktail worn on the headgear was adopted as the "official badge" of the Tammany Society. The wearing of the bucktail was said to have been suggested by its appearance in the costume of the Tammany Indians in the vicinity of New York.

The Bucktails were led by Martin Van Buren, and included John King (son of Federalist Rufus King), and William L. Marcy of Troy. Van Buren and Marcy would later be influential members of the Democratic Party, and Tammany Hall would be a major force in New York Democratic politics for the next century.

Between 1817 and 1821 in New York, Van Buren turned his Bucktail supporters into the first statewide political machine. He purchased a newspaper, the Albany Argus, and used it to promote his policies and get out the vote. Patronage was an even more important tool. When Van Buren’s Bucktails won control of the New York legislature in 1821, they acquired the power to appoint some six thousand of their friends to positions in New York’s legal bureaucracy of judges, justices of the peace, sheriffs, deed commissioners, and coroners. Critics called this ruthless distribution of offices a spoils system, but Van Buren argued that it was fair, operating “sometimes in favor of one party, sometimes of another”.
