= 43rd New York State Legislature =

New York state legislative session

| ← | 42nd | 44th | → |
- The Old State Capitol (1879)

Overview
- Legislative body: New York State Legislature
- Jurisdiction: New York, United States
- Term: July 1, 1819 – June 30, 1820

Senate
- Members: 32
- President: Lt. Gov. John Tayler (Dem.-Rep.)
- Party control: Bucktail

Assembly
- Members: 126
- Speaker: John C. Spencer (Clint.)
- Party control: Clintonian-Federalist

Sessions
- 1st: January 4 – April 14, 1820

The 43rd New York State Legislature, consisting of the New York State Senate and the New York State Assembly, met from January 4 to April 14, 1820, during the third year of DeWitt Clinton's governorship, in Albany.

== Background ==
Under the provisions of the New York Constitution of 1777, amended by the Constitutional Convention of 1801, 32 Senators were elected on general tickets in the four senatorial districts for four-year terms. They were divided into four classes, and every year eight Senate seats came up for election. Assemblymen were elected countywide on general tickets to a one-year term, the whole Assembly being renewed annually.

In 1797, Albany was declared the State capital, and all subsequent Legislatures have met there since. In 1818, the Legislature enacted that future Legislatures meet on the first Tuesday of January of each year unless called earlier by the governor.

State Senator Darius Crosby died on November 18, 1818, leaving a vacancy in the Southern District.

At this time the politicians were divided into two opposing political parties: the Federalists and the Democratic-Republicans. The Democratic-Republican Party was split into two factions: the Clintonians (supporters of Gov. DeWitt Clinton) and the Bucktails (led by Martin Van Buren, and including the Tammany Hall organization in New York City).

== Elections ==
The State election was held from April 27 to 29, 1819. The Federalists ran their own tickets in counties where they had a majority, but endorsed and supported the Clintonians in most places where they were a minority.

Senator Peter R. Livingston (Southern D.) was re-elected. Charles E. Dudley, John T. More (both Middle D.), Benjamin Mooers, Thomas Frothingham (both Eastern D.), Gideon Granger, Lyman Paine (both Western D.), and Assemblyman Duncan McMartin Jr. (Eastern D.) were also elected to full terms in the Senate. John Townsend (Southern D.) was elected to fill the vacancy. Livingston, Dudley, More and Townsend were Bucktails, the other five Clintonians.

== Sessions ==
The Legislature met at the Old State Capitol in Albany on January 4, 1820, and adjourned on April 14.

John C. Spencer (Clint.) was elected Speaker by a combined Clintonian/Federalist majority with 64 votes against 50 for Peter Sharpe (Buckt.). Aaron Clark (Dem.-Rep.) was re-elected Clerk of the Assembly with 87 votes against 32 for James Van Ingen (Fed.).

After resolutions for the call of a Constitutional convention had been rejected during the two previous sessions, Gov. DeWitt Clinton now recommended to call a convention with limited powers to amend the State Constitution. This convention should have the power to abolish the Council of Appointment, and consider such other amendments as designated by the Legislature. The Bucktails wanted a Convention with unlimited powers, and nothing came of it at this session either. The issue was pursued further by the Bucktails at the next session, and led to the New York State Constitutional Convention of 1821, and a new Constitution.

On January 8, the Legislature re-elected unanimously Rufus King (Fed.) as U.S. Senator from New York, to fill the vacancy caused by the failure to elect a successor during the previous session.

On January 18, a caucus of 64 Bucktail legislators nominated U.S. Vice President Daniel D. Tompkins for Governor and State Senator Benjamin Mooers for Lieutenant Governor.

== State Senate ==
=== Districts ===
- The Southern District (6 seats) consisted of Dutchess, Kings, New York, Putnam, Queens, Richmond, Rockland, Suffolk and Westchester counties.
- The Middle District (9 seats) consisted of Albany, Chenango, Columbia, Delaware, Greene, Orange, Otsego, Schoharie, Sullivan and Ulster counties.
- The Eastern District (8 seats) consisted of Clinton, Essex, Franklin, Hamilton, Herkimer, Jefferson, Lewis, Montgomery, Rensselaer, St. Lawrence, Saratoga, Schenectady, Warren and Washington counties.
- The Western District (9 seats) consisted of Allegany, Broome, Cattaraugus, Cayuga, Chautauqua, Cortland, Genesee, Madison, Niagara, Oneida, Onondaga, Ontario, Oswego, Seneca, Steuben, Tioga and Tompkins counties.
Note: There are now 62 counties in the State of New York. The counties which are not mentioned in this list had not yet been established, or sufficiently organized, the area being included in one or more of the abovementioned counties.

=== Members ===
The asterisk (*) denotes members of the previous Legislature who continued in office as members of this Legislature. Duncan McMartin Jr. changed from the Assembly to the Senate.

| District | Senators | Term left | Party | Notes |
|---|---|---|---|---|
| Southern | Walter Bowne* | 1 year | Dem.-Rep./Bucktail | |
| Southern | John D. Ditmis* | 1 year | Dem.-Rep./Bucktail | elected to the Council of Appointment |
| Southern | Stephen Barnum* | 2 years | Dem.-Rep./Bucktail | |
| Southern | Jonathan Dayton* | 2 years | Dem.-Rep./Bucktail | |
| Southern | John Townsend | 3 years | Dem.-Rep./Bucktail | elected to fill vacancy, in place of Darius Crosby |
| Southern | Peter R. Livingston* | 4 years | Dem.-Rep./Bucktail | |
| Middle | John Noyes* | 1 year | Dem.-Rep./Clintonian | |
| Middle | Peter Swart* | 1 year | Dem.-Rep./Clintonian | |
| Middle | Martin Van Buren* | 1 year | Dem.-Rep./Bucktail | until July 8, 1819, also New York Attorney General |
| Middle | Jabez D. Hammond* | 2 years | Dem.-Rep./Clintonian | |
| Middle | John Lounsbery* | 2 years | Dem.-Rep./Clintonian | elected to the Council of Appointment |
| Middle | Moses Austin* | 3 years | Dem.-Rep./Bucktail | |
| Middle | William Ross* | 3 years | Dem.-Rep./Clintonian | |
| Middle | Charles E. Dudley | 4 years | Dem.-Rep./Bucktail | |
| Middle | John T. More | 4 years | Dem.-Rep./Bucktail | |
| Eastern | Roger Skinner* | 2 years | Dem.-Rep./Bucktail | until November 24, 1819, also U.S. Attorney for the Northern District of New York; from November 24, 1819, Judge of the U.S. District; Court for the Northern District of New York |
| Eastern | Henry Yates Jr.* | 2 years | Dem.-Rep./Bucktail | |
| Eastern | Samuel Young* | 2 years | Dem.-Rep./Bucktail | also an Erie Canal Commissioner |
| Eastern | Levi Adams* | 3 years | Dem.-Rep./Clintonian | elected to the Council of Appointment |
| Eastern | George Rosecrantz* | 3 years | Dem.-Rep./Clintonian | |
| Eastern | Thomas Frothingham | 4 years | Dem.-Rep./Clintonian | |
| Eastern | Duncan McMartin Jr.* | 4 years | Dem.-Rep./Clintonian | |
| Eastern | Benjamin Mooers | 4 years | Dem.-Rep. | |
| Western | Ephraim Hart* | 1 year | Dem.-Rep./Clintonian | elected to the Council of Appointment |
| Western | John Knox* | 1 year | Dem.-Rep./Bucktail | |
| Western | William Mallery* | 1 year | Dem.-Rep. | |
| Western | Isaac Wilson* | 2 years | Dem.-Rep./Bucktail | |
| Western | Gamaliel H. Barstow* | 3 years | Dem.-Rep./Clintonian | also First Judge of the Tioga County Court |
| Western | Perry G. Childs* | 3 years | Dem.-Rep./Bucktail | |
| Western | David E. Evans* | 3 years | Dem.-Rep./Bucktail | |
| Western | Gideon Granger | 4 years | Dem.-Rep./Clintonian | |
| Western | Lyman Paine | 4 years | Dem.-Rep./Clintonian | |

=== Employees ===
- Clerk: John F. Bacon

== State Assembly ==
=== Districts ===
- Albany County (4 seats)
- Allegany and Steuben counties (2 seats)
- Broome County (1 seat)
- Cattaraugus, Chautauqua and Niagara counties (2 seats)
- Cayuga County (3 seats)
- Chenango County (3 seats)
- Clinton and Franklin counties (1 seat)
- Columbia County (4 seats)
- Cortland County (1 seat)
- Delaware County (2 seats)
- Dutchess County (5 seats)
- Essex County (1 seat)
- Genesee County (3 seats)
- Greene County (2 seats)
- Hamilton and Montgomery counties (5 seats)
- Herkimer County (3 seats)
- Jefferson County (2 seats)
- Kings County (1 seat)
- Lewis County (1 seat)
- Madison County (3 seats)
- The City and County of New York (11 seats)
- Oneida and Oswego counties (5 seats)
- Onondaga County (4 seats)
- Ontario County (7 seats)
- Orange County (4 seats)
- Otsego County (5 seats)
- Putnam County (1 seat)
- Queens County (3 seats)
- Rensselaer County (5 seats)
- Richmond County (1 seat)
- Rockland County (1 seat)
- St. Lawrence County (1 seat)
- Saratoga County (4 seats)
- Schenectady County (2 seats)
- Schoharie County (3 seats)
- Seneca County (2 seats)
- Suffolk County (3 seats)
- Sullivan and Ulster counties (4 seats)
- Tioga County (1 seat)
- Tompkins County (2 seats)
- Warren and Washington counties (5 seats)
- Westchester County (3 seats)
Note: There are now 62 counties in the State of New York. The counties which are not mentioned in this list had not yet been established, or sufficiently organized, the area being included in one or more of the abovementioned counties.

=== Assemblymen ===
The asterisk (*) denotes members of the previous Legislature who continued as members of this Legislature. Henry Seymour changed from the Senate to the Assembly.

| District | Assemblymen | Party | Notes |
|---|---|---|---|
| Albany | Asa Colvard | Federalist | |
| Albany | James McKown | Federalist | |
| Albany | Peter S. Schuyler | Federalist | |
| Albany | Stephen Willes | Federalist | |
| Allegany and Steuben | Clark Crandall | Federalist | |
| Allegany and Steuben | John Dow* | Federalist | |
| Broome | Chester Patterson* | Dem.-Rep./Bucktail | |
| Cattaraugus, Chautauqua and Niagara | Elial T. Foote | | |
| Cattaraugus, Chautauqua and Niagara | Oliver Forward | Dem.-Rep./Clintonian | |
| Cayuga | William Allen* | | |
| Cayuga | Samuel Dill | | |
| Cayuga | John Haring | | |
| Chenango | Samuel Campbell | Dem.-Rep./Bucktail | |
| Chenango | Thomas Humphrey* | Dem.-Rep./Bucktail | |
| Chenango | Samuel A. Smith | Dem.-Rep./Bucktail | |
| Clinton and Franklin | Platt Newcomb | Dem.-Rep./Clintonian | |
| Columbia | Thomas Brodhead | | |
| Columbia | Azariah Platt | | |
| Columbia | John I. Van Valkenburgh | | |
| Columbia | Elisha Williams | Federalist | |
| Cortland | John Miller | Dem.-Rep. | |
| Delaware | Peter Pine | | |
| Delaware | Erastus Root* | Dem.-Rep./Bucktail | |
| Dutchess | Abraham Bockee | Federalist | |
| Dutchess | Jacob Doughty | Federalist | |
| Dutchess | Matthew Mesier | Federalist | |
| Dutchess | Thomas J. Oakley* | Federalist | from July 8, 1819, also New York Attorney General |
| Dutchess | John W. Wheeler | Federalist | |
| Essex | John Hoffnagle* | Dem.-Rep./Clintonian | |
| Genesee | Fitch Chipman | | |
| Genesee | Gideon T. Jenkins | | |
| Genesee | Robert McKay | | |
| Greene | Abijah Reed | | |
| Greene | Perez Steele | Federalist | |
| Hamilton and Montgomery | Henry J. Diefendorf | Dem.-Rep./Bucktail | |
| Hamilton and Montgomery | Henry Fonda | Dem.-Rep./Bucktail | |
| Hamilton and Montgomery | John T. Francisco | Dem.-Rep./Bucktail | |
| Hamilton and Montgomery | Lawrence Gros | Dem.-Rep./Bucktail | |
| Hamilton and Montgomery | Jacob Hees* | Dem.-Rep./Bucktail | |
| Herkimer | Philo M. Hackley | Federalist | |
| Herkimer | Jacob Markell | Federalist | |
| Herkimer | James Orton | Federalist | |
| Jefferson | Calvin McKnight | Dem.-Rep./Bucktail | |
| Jefferson | Hiram Steele | Dem.-Rep./Bucktail | |
| Kings | Teunis Schenck* | Dem.-Rep./Bucktail | |
| Lewis | Nathaniel Merriam | | |
| Madison | Amos Crocker | | |
| Madison | Eliphalet S. Jackson | | |
| Madison | Levi Morton | | |
| New York | Clarkson Crolius* | Dem.-Rep./Bucktail | |
| New York | Jacob Drake | Dem.-Rep./Bucktail | |
| New York | Richard Hatfield* | Dem.-Rep./Bucktail | |
| New York | Cornelius Heeney* | Dem.-Rep./Bucktail | |
| New York | Robert R. Hunter* | Dem.-Rep./Bucktail | |
| New York | John T. Irving* | Dem.-Rep./Bucktail | |
| New York | Reuben Munson | | |
| New York | Samuel B. Romaine* | Dem.-Rep./Bucktail | |
| New York | Peter Sharpe* | Dem.-Rep./Bucktail | |
| New York | Michael Ulshoeffer* | Dem.-Rep./Bucktail | |
| New York | Samuel Watkins* | Dem.-Rep./Bucktail | |
| Oneida and Oswego | James Dean Jr. | | |
| Oneida and Oswego | George Huntington* | Federalist | |
| Oneida and Oswego | Henry McNeil | Federalist | |
| Oneida and Oswego | Theophilus S. Morgan | Federalist | |
| Oneida and Oswego | John Storrs | Federalist | |
| Onondaga | Jonas Earll, Jr. | | |
| Onondaga | Henry Field | | |
| Onondaga | Henry Seymour* | Dem.-Rep./Bucktail | also an Erie Canal Commissioner |
| Onondaga | Lewis Smith | | |
| Ontario | Valentine Brother | Federalist | |
| Ontario | Byram Green* | | |
| Ontario | John Price | | |
| Ontario | John C. Spencer | Dem.-Rep./Clintonian | elected Speaker |
| Ontario | Elisha B. Strong | Federalist | |
| Ontario | John Van Vossen | | |
| Ontario | Matthew Warner | | |
| Orange | James Finch Jr. | Dem.-Rep./Bucktail | |
| Orange | Nathaniel P. Hill* | Dem.-Rep./Bucktail | |
| Orange | Selah Tuthill | Dem.-Rep./Bucktail | |
| Orange | Abraham Vail | Dem.-Rep./Bucktail | |
| Otsego | Samuel Caldwell | | |
| Otsego | Seth Chase* | | |
| Otsego | Willard Coye | | |
| Otsego | James Hawkes | Dem.-Rep. | |
| Otsego | Henry Ogden | Dem.-Rep./Clintonian | |
| Putnam | David Knapp | | |
| Queens | William Jones | Federalist | |
| Queens | John A. King* | Federalist | |
| Queens | Thomas Tredwell | Federalist | |
| Rensselaer | John Babcock | | |
| Rensselaer | David Doolittle | | |
| Rensselaer | William C. Elmore | | |
| Rensselaer | George Tibbits | Federalist | |
| Rensselaer | Ebenezer W. Walbridge | Federalist | |
| Richmond | Harmanus Guyon* | Federalist | |
| Rockland | Samuel G. Verbryck | Dem.-Rep./Bucktail | |
| St. Lawrence | Joseph York* | Dem.-Rep./Bucktail | |
| Saratoga | Billy J. Clark | | |
| Saratoga | Jonathan Delano Jr. | | |
| Saratoga | Abraham Moe | | |
| Saratoga | Elisha Powell | | |
| Schenectady | Christian Haverly | | |
| Schenectady | Marinus Willet | | |
| Schoharie | Heman Hickock | Dem.-Rep./Clintonian | |
| Schoharie | Jedediah Miller* | Dem.-Rep./Clintonian | |
| Schoharie | Peter Swart Jr.* | Dem.-Rep./Clintonian | |
| Seneca | Thomas Armstrong | Dem.-Rep./Bucktail | |
| Seneca | Robert S. Rose | Dem.-Rep./Bucktail | |
| Suffolk | Ebenezer W. Case | | |
| Suffolk | Charles H. Havens | | |
| Suffolk | Abraham Parsons | | |
| Sullivan and Ulster | Joseph Deyo* | Dem.-Rep./Bucktail | |
| Sullivan and Ulster | Isaac Elting | Dem.-Rep./Clintonian | |
| Sullivan and Ulster | Charles H. Ruggles | Dem.-Rep./Clintonian | |
| Sullivan and Ulster | Jacob Snyder | Dem.-Rep./Bucktail | |
| Tioga | Judson Jennings | | |
| Tompkins | Herman Camp | Dem.-Rep./Clintonian | |
| Tompkins | Joshua Philips | Dem.-Rep./Clintonian | |
| Warren and Washington | David Austin | Dem.-Rep./Clintonian | |
| Warren and Washington | Peleg Bragg | Dem.-Rep./Clintonian | |
| Warren and Washington | Norman Fox* | Dem.-Rep./Clintonian | |
| Warren and Washington | James Hill | Dem.-Rep./Clintonian | |
| Warren and Washington | John Kirtland | Dem.-Rep./Clintonian | |
| Westchester | James Guyon* | Dem.-Rep./Bucktail | |
| Westchester | Abraham Miller | Dem.-Rep./Bucktail | |
| Westchester | William Nelson | Dem.-Rep./Bucktail | |

=== Employees ===
- Clerk: Aaron Clark
- Doorkeeper: Henry Bates

== Sources ==
- The New York Civil List compiled by Franklin Benjamin Hough (Weed, Parsons and Co., 1858) [see pg. 108f for Senate districts; pg. 124 for senators; pg. 148f for Assembly districts; pg. 195f for assemblymen]
- The History of Political Parties in the State of New-York, from the Ratification of the Federal Constitution to 1840 by Jabez D. Hammond (4th ed., Vol. 1, H. & E. Phinney, Cooperstown, 1846; pages 502–531)
- Election result Assembly, Albany Co. at project "A New Nation Votes", compiled by Phil Lampi, hosted by Tufts University Digital Library
- Partial election result Assembly, Allegany and Steuben Co. at project "A New Nation Votes" [gives only votes of Allegany Co.]
- Partial election result Assembly, Cattaraugus, Chautauqua and Niagara Co. at project "A New Nation Votes" [gives only votes from Chautauqua Co.]
- Partial election result Assembly, Cattaraugus, Chautauqua and Niagara Co. at project "A New Nation Votes" [gives only votes from Niagara Co.]
- Election result Assembly, Chenango Co. at project "A New Nation Votes"
- Election result Assembly, Clinton and Franklin Co. at project "A New Nation Votes"
- Election result Assembly, Delaware Co. at project "A New Nation Votes"
- Election result Assembly, Dutchess Co. at project "A New Nation Votes"
- Election result Assembly, Essex Co. at project "A New Nation Votes"
- Election result Assembly, Genesee Co. at project "A New Nation Votes"
- Election result Assembly, Hamilton and Montgomery Co. at project "A New Nation Votes"
- Election result Assembly, Herkimer Co. at project "A New Nation Votes"
- Election result Assembly, Jefferson Co. at project "A New Nation Votes"
- Election result Assembly, Kings Co. at project "A New Nation Votes"
- Election result Assembly, Orange Co. at project "A New Nation Votes"
- Election result Assembly, Queens Co. at project "A New Nation Votes"
- Election result Assembly, Rockland Co. at project "A New Nation Votes"
- Election result Assembly, St. Lawrence Co. at project "A New Nation Votes"
- Election result Assembly, Saratoga Co. at project "A New Nation Votes"
- Election result Assembly, Schenectady Co. at project "A New Nation Votes"
- Election result Assembly, Schoharie Co. at project "A New Nation Votes"
- Election result Assembly, Seneca Co. at project "A New Nation Votes"
- Election result Assembly, Sullivan and Ulster Co. at project "A New Nation Votes"
- Election result Assembly, Tioga Co. at project "A New Nation Votes"
- Election result Assembly, Tompkins Co. at project "A New Nation Votes"
- Election result Assembly, Westchester Co. at project "A New Nation Votes"
- Partial election result Senate, Southern D. at project "A New Nation Votes" [gives only votes from Dutchess, Kings, Queens, Rockland and Westchester Co.; gives wrong party affiliation for Tallmadge]
- Partial election result Senate, Middle D. at project "A New Nation Votes" [gives only votes from Albany, Chenango, Delaware, Orange, Schoharie, Sullivan and Ulster Co.]
- Partial election result Senate, Eastern D. at project "A New Nation Votes" [gives only votes from Clinton, Herkimer, Jefferson, Montgomery, St. Lawrence, Saratoga, Schenectady, Washington and Warren Co.]
- Partial election result Senate, Western D. at project "A New Nation Votes" [gives only votes of Allegany, Chautauqua, Genesee, Niagara, Seneca, Tioga and Tompkins Co.; gives wrong party affiliations]
- Election result Speaker at project "A New Nation Votes"
- Election result Assembly Clerk at project "A New Nation Votes"
