= 45th New York State Legislature =

New York state legislative session

←	44th	46th	→
- The Old State Capitol (1879)

Overview
- Legislative body: New York State Legislature
- Jurisdiction: New York, United States
- Term: July 1, 1821 – December 31, 1822

Senate
- Members: 32
- President: Lt. Gov. John Tayler (Clint.)
- Party control: Split (16-16)

Assembly
- Members: 126
- Speaker: Samuel B. Romaine (Buckt.)
- Party control: Bucktail (70-52)

Sessions
- 1st: January 2 – April 17, 1822

The 45th New York State Legislature, consisting of the New York State Senate and the New York State Assembly, met from January 2 to April 17, 1822, during the fifth year of DeWitt Clinton's governorship, in Albany.

== Background ==
Under the provisions of the New York Constitution of 1777, amended by the Constitutional Convention of 1801, 32 Senators were elected on general tickets in the four senatorial districts for four-year terms. They were divided into four classes, and every year eight Senate seats came up for election. Assemblymen were elected countywide on general tickets to a one-year term, the whole Assembly being renewed annually.

In 1797, Albany was declared the State capital, and all subsequent Legislatures have been meeting there ever since. In 1818, the Legislature enacted that future Legislatures meet on the first Tuesday of January of each year unless called earlier by the governor.

State Senator Gideon Granger resigned in 1821, leaving a vacancy in the Western District.

On March 13, 1821, the 44th New York State Legislature passed a bill to submit the question, whether a Constitutional Convention should be called, to the voters at the next State election in April 1821.

In 1821, Erie County was split from Niagara County, but remained with Cattaraugus, Chautauqua and Niagara in one Assembly district. Livingston and Monroe counties were formed from parts of Genesee and Ontario counties, and were apportioned one seat each in the Assembly, taken from Ontario.

At this time the politicians were divided into two opposing political parties: the Federalists and the Democratic-Republicans. The Democratic-Republican Party was split into two factions: the Clintonians (supporters of Gov. DeWitt Clinton) and the Bucktails (led by Martin Van Buren, and including the Tammany Hall organization in New York City). The Federalist Party was disbanding, the majority joined the Clintonians, a minority joined the Bucktails.

== Elections ==
The State election was held from April 24 to 26, 1821. Abel Huntington (Southern D.), Abraham J. Hasbrouck (Middle D.), David C. Judson, Daniel Shipherd, John L. Viele (all three Eastern D.), Henry Seymour ( Western D.); and Assemblymen Abraham Gurnee (Southern D.), Archibald McIntyre (Middle D.) and Samuel M. Hopkins (Western D.) were also elected to the Senate. Huntington, Gurnee and Seymour were Bucktails, the other six Clintonians.

At the same time, the question whether a Convention to amend the New York Constitution should be called, was answered in the affirmative by the voters, and delegates to the Constitutional Convention of 1821 were elected in June.

== Sessions ==
The Constitutional Convention met from August 28 to November 10, 1821, and the new Constitution was adopted by the voters in January 1822.

The Legislature met at the Old State Capitol in Albany on January 1, 1822, and adjourned on April 17.

Samuel B. Romaine (Buckt.) was elected Speaker with 74 votes against 44 for George Huntington (Clint.). Edward Livingston (Buckt.) was elected Clerk of the Assembly with the same vote against Sandford Cobb (Clint.).

On April 12, the Legislature re-apportioned the Assembly districts. All multiple-county districts (except Hamilton and Montgomery) were dismembered, and every county became a district. The total number of assemblymen was increased from 126 to 128.

On April 17, the Legislature enacted that future State elections be held on the first Monday in November and the two succeeding days.

== State Senate ==
=== Districts ===
- The Southern District (6 seats) consisted of Dutchess, Kings, New York, Putnam, Queens, Richmond, Rockland, Suffolk and Westchester counties.
- The Middle District (9 seats) consisted of Albany, Chenango, Columbia, Delaware, Greene, Orange, Otsego, Schoharie, Sullivan and Ulster counties.
- The Eastern District (8 seats) consisted of Clinton, Essex, Franklin, Hamilton, Herkimer, Jefferson, Lewis, Montgomery, Rensselaer, St. Lawrence, Saratoga, Schenectady, Warren and Washington counties.
- The Western District (9 seats) consisted of Allegany, Broome, Cattaraugus, Cayuga, Chautauqua, Cortland, Erie, Genesee, Livingston, Madison, Monroe, Niagara, Oneida, Onondaga, Ontario, Oswego, Seneca, Steuben, Tioga and Tompkins counties.
Note: There are now 62 counties in the State of New York. The counties which are not mentioned in this list had not yet been established, or sufficiently organized, the area being included in one or more of the abovementioned counties.

=== Members ===
The asterisk (*) denotes members of the previous Legislature who continued in office as members of this Legislature. Abraham Gurnee, Archibald McIntyre and Samuel M. Hopkins changed from the Assembly to the Senate.

Under the provisions of the new Constitution, all senators were legislated out of office at the end of 1822. The whole Senate was renewed at the State election in November 1822, the term of the new senators beginning on January 1, 1823.

District	Senators	Term left	Party	Notes
Southern	John Townsend*	1 year	Dem.-Rep./Bucktail	elected to the Council of Appointment
Southern	Peter R. Livingston*	2 years	Dem.-Rep./Bucktail	
Southern	Walter Bowne*	3 years	Dem.-Rep./Bucktail	
Southern	John Lefferts*	3 years	Dem.-Rep./Bucktail	also a delegate to the Constitutional Convention
Southern	Abraham Gurnee*	4 years	Dem.-Rep./Bucktail	
Southern	Abel Huntington	4 years	Dem.-Rep./Bucktail	
Middle	Moses Austin*	1 year	Dem.-Rep./Bucktail	
Middle	William Ross*	1 year	Dem.-Rep./Clintonian	
Middle	Charles E. Dudley*	2 years	Dem.-Rep./Bucktail	also Mayor of Albany; elected to the Council of Appointment
Middle	John T. More*	2 years	Dem.-Rep./Bucktail	
Middle	William C. Bouck*	3 years	Dem.-Rep./Bucktail	also an Erie Canal Commissioner
Middle	Tilly Lynde*	3 years	Dem.-Rep./Bucktail	
Middle	John J. Miller*	3 years	Dem.-Rep./Bucktail	
Middle	Abraham J. Hasbrouck	4 years	Dem.-Rep./Clintonian	
Middle	Archibald McIntyre*	4 years	Dem.-Rep./Clintonian	
Eastern	Levi Adams*	1 year	Dem.-Rep./Clintonian	
Eastern	George Rosecrantz*	1 year	Dem.-Rep./Clintonian	
Eastern	Thomas Frothingham*	2 years	Dem.-Rep./Clintonian	
Eastern	Duncan McMartin Jr.*	2 years	Dem.-Rep./Clintonian	
Eastern	Benjamin Mooers*	2 years	Dem.-Rep./Bucktail	elected to the Council of Appointment
Eastern	David C. Judson	4 years	Dem.-Rep./Clintonian	
Eastern	Daniel Shipherd	4 years	Dem.-Rep./Clintonian	
Eastern	John L. Viele	4 years	Dem.-Rep./Clintonian	
Western	Gamaliel H. Barstow*	1 year	Dem.-Rep./Clintonian	also First Judge of the Tioga County Court
Western	Perry G. Childs*	1 year	Dem.-Rep./Bucktail	elected to the Council of Appointment
Western	David E. Evans*	1 year	Dem.-Rep./Bucktail	
Western	Lyman Paine*	2 years	Dem.-Rep./Clintonian	
Western	Henry Seymour	2 years	Dem.-Rep./Bucktail	elected to fill vacancy, in place of Gideon Granger
Western	Ephraim Hart*	3 years	Dem.-Rep./Clintonian	
Western	Oliver Forward*	3 years	Dem.-Rep./Clintonian	
Western	Elijah Miles*	3 years	Dem.-Rep./Clintonian	
Western	Samuel M. Hopkins*	4 years	Dem.-Rep./Clintonian	

=== Employees ===
- Clerk: John F. Bacon

== State Assembly ==
=== Districts ===
- Albany County (4 seats)
- Allegany and Steuben counties (2 seats)
- Broome County (1 seat)
- Cattaraugus, Chautauqua, Erie and Niagara counties (2 seats)
- Cayuga County (3 seats)
- Chenango County (3 seats)
- Clinton and Franklin counties (1 seat)
- Columbia County (4 seats)
- Cortland County (1 seat)
- Delaware County (2 seats)
- Dutchess County (5 seats)
- Essex County (1 seat)
- Genesee County (3 seats)
- Greene County (2 seats)
- Hamilton and Montgomery counties (5 seats)
- Herkimer County (3 seats)
- Jefferson County (2 seats)
- Kings County (1 seat)
- Lewis County (1 seat)
- Livingston County (1 seat)
- Madison County (3 seats)
- Monroe County (1 seat)
- The City and County of New York (11 seats)
- Oneida and Oswego counties (5 seats)
- Onondaga County (4 seats)
- Ontario County (5 seats)
- Orange County (4 seats)
- Otsego County (5 seats)
- Putnam County (1 seat)
- Queens County (3 seats)
- Rensselaer County (5 seats)
- Richmond County (1 seat)
- Rockland County (1 seat)
- St. Lawrence County (1 seat)
- Saratoga County (4 seats)
- Schenectady County (2 seats)
- Schoharie County (3 seats)
- Seneca County (2 seats)
- Suffolk County (3 seats)
- Sullivan and Ulster counties (4 seats)
- Tioga County (1 seat)
- Tompkins County (2 seats)
- Warren and Washington counties (5 seats)
- Westchester County (3 seats)
Note: There are now 62 counties in the State of New York. The counties which are not mentioned in this list had not yet been established, or sufficiently organized, the area being included in one or more of the abovementioned counties.

=== Assemblymen ===
The asterisk (*) denotes members of the previous Legislature who continued as members of this Legislature.

District	Assemblymen	Party	Notes
Albany	James McKown*	Fed./Clintonian	
Albany	William McKown	Fed./Clintonian	
Albany	Volkert D. Oothoudt	Fed./Clintonian	
Albany	John P. Shear	Fed./Clintonian	
Allegany and Steuben	Amos Peabody		
Allegany and Steuben	Grattan H. Wheeler		
Broome	Chauncey Hyde	Dem.-Rep./Bucktail	
Cattaraugus, Chautauqua, Erie and Niagara	Thomas B. Campbell	Dem.-Rep./Clintonian	
Cattaraugus, Chautauqua, Erie and Niagara	David Eason	Dem.-Rep./Bucktail	contested by Isaac Phelps who was seated on January 5, 1822
Cayuga	Samuel Dill		
Cayuga	Charles Kellogg*		
Cayuga	Ephraim Marsh		
Chenango	William Mason*	Dem.-Rep./Clintonian	
Chenango	Edmond G. Per Lee*		
Chenango	John Tracy*	Dem.-Rep./Bucktail	also Surrogate of Chenango Co.
Clinton and Franklin	Abijah North	Dem.-Rep./Bucktail	
Columbia	Philip P. Clum		
Columbia	Elisha Gilbert Jr.	Fed./Clintonian	
Columbia	George T. Snyder		
Columbia	Augustus Tremain		
Cortland	Daniel Sherwood		
Delaware	Benjamin Benedict		
Delaware	Asa Grant		
Dutchess	John Cox		
Dutchess	Daniel Northrup		
Dutchess	Philo Ruggles	Clintonian	
Dutchess	Benjamin Sherman		
Dutchess	George Vanderburgh		
Essex	Isaac Finch	Dem.-Rep./Bucktail	
Genesee	Robert Anderson		
Genesee	Benedict Brooks		
Genesee	Samuel McWhorter		
Greene	James Powers	Fed./Clintonian	
Greene	Jacob Roggen	Fed./Clintonian	
Hamilton and Montgomery	John W. Cady	Dem.-Rep./Clintonian	in November 1822, elected to the 18th U.S. Congress
Hamilton and Montgomery	Nicholas Gros		
Hamilton and Montgomery	James McIntyre	Dem.-Rep./Clintonian	
Hamilton and Montgomery	Henry Valentine		
Hamilton and Montgomery	Joshua Webster		
Herkimer	Christopher P. Bellinger	Dem.-Rep./Bucktail	contested by Stephen Todd (F/C) who was seated in January 1822
Herkimer	Simeon Ford*	Fed./Clintonian	also D.A. of Herkimer Co.
Herkimer	Robert Shoemaker	Fed./Clintonian	
Jefferson	George Andrus	Dem.-Rep./Clintonian	
Jefferson	John B. Esselstyn	Dem.-Rep./Clintonian	
Kings	Jeremiah Lott*	Fed./Clintonian	
Lewis	Chester Buck		
Livingston	George Smith		
Madison	Pardon Barnard		
Madison	Henry Clark Jr.		
Madison	Justin Dwinell*	Dem.-Rep./Bucktail	
Monroe	Nathaniel Rochester	Dem.-Rep./Bucktail	
New York	Philip Brasher		
New York	George Buckmaster	Dem.-Rep./Bucktail	
New York	Clarkson Crolius*	Dem.-Rep./Bucktail	
New York	Junius H. Hatch		
New York	Cornelius Heeney*	Dem.-Rep./Bucktail	
New York	Jeromus Johnson	Dem.-Rep./Bucktail	
New York	John Morss	Dem.-Rep./Bucktail	
New York	Reuben Munson*		
New York	Samuel B. Romaine*	Dem.-Rep./Bucktail	elected Speaker
New York	Michael Ulshoeffer*	Dem.-Rep./Bucktail	
New York	Gulian C. Verplanck*	Dem.-Rep./Bucktail	
Oneida and Oswego	Greene C. Bronson	Clintonian	
Oneida and Oswego	Samuel Chandler		
Oneida and Oswego	George Huntington*	Fed./Clintonian	
Oneida and Oswego	Peter Pratt		
Oneida and Oswego	Israel Stoddard		
Onondaga	Josephus Barker		
Onondaga	Silvester Gardner		
Onondaga	James Geddes	Fed./Clintonian	
Onondaga	David Munro	Dem.-Rep./Bucktail	
Ontario	Birdseye Brooks		
Ontario	Byram Green		
Ontario	Isaac Marsh		
Ontario	Aaron Remer		
Ontario	David White		
Orange	James Burt*	Dem.-Rep./Bucktail	
Orange	Egbert Jansen		
Orange	Joseph McLaughlin		
Orange	Abraham Shultz		
Otsego	John Blakeley*	Dem.-Rep./Bucktail	
Otsego	Calvin Brookins		
Otsego	George Fenno		
Otsego	Joseph Mumford		
Otsego	Artemas Sheldon		
Putnam	Edward Smith		
Queens	William Jones	Fed./Clintonian	
Queens	Timothy Nostrand	Fed./Clintonian	
Queens	Thomas Tredwell	Fed./Clintonian	
Rensselaer	Daniel Gray	Fed./Clintonian	
Rensselaer	James Jones		
Rensselaer	Harper Rogers		
Rensselaer	Levi Rumsey		
Rensselaer	Gardner Tracy		
Richmond	Samuel Barton*	Dem.-Rep./Bucktail	
Rockland	Cornelius Blauvelt		
St. Lawrence	William H. Vining		did not take his seat, and died in 1822
Saratoga	Thomas Collamer		
Saratoga	Conrad Cramer		
Saratoga	John Gilchrist		
Saratoga	John Prior		
Schenectady	John F. D. Vedder	Dem.-Rep./Bucktail	
Schenectady	James Walker	Dem.-Rep./Bucktail	
Schoharie	Abraham Keyser, Jr.*	Dem.-Rep./Bucktail	
Schoharie	Freegift Patchin*	Dem.-Rep./Bucktail	
Schoharie	Harvey Watson	Dem.-Rep./Clintonian	
Seneca	James Dickson		
Seneca	John Maynard		also Seneca County Clerk
Suffolk	Hugh Halsey		
Suffolk	Tredwell Scudder		
Suffolk	John M. Williamson*		
Sullivan and Ulster	John Brodhead Jr.	Fed./Clintonian	
Sullivan and Ulster	Charles Bruyn	Fed./Clintonian	
Sullivan and Ulster	Jacob J. Hasbrouck	Fed./Clintonian	
Sullivan and Ulster	William A. Stokes		
Tioga	Jared Patchin		
Tompkins	Samuel Crittenden*		
Tompkins	Peter Hager 2d*	Dem.-Rep./Bucktail	
Warren and Washington	John Baker		
Warren and Washington	Duncan Cameron		
Warren and Washington	Silas D. Kellogg		
Warren and Washington	William McDonald		
Warren and Washington	James Teft		
Westchester	Joseph Hunt	Dem.-Rep./Bucktail	
Westchester	Thomas Smith	Dem.-Rep./Bucktail	
Westchester	Enoch Thompson	Dem.-Rep./Bucktail	

=== Employees ===
- Clerk: Edward Livingston
- Sergeant-at-Arms: Henry Fryer
- Doorkeeper: James Myers
- Assistant Doorkeeper: William Campbell

== Sources ==
- The New York Civil List compiled by Franklin Benjamin Hough (Weed, Parsons and Co., 1858) [see pg. 108f for Senate districts; pg. 124 for senators; pg. 148f for Assembly districts; pg. 198f for assemblymen; pg. 56ff for Constitutional convention]
- The History of Political Parties in the State of New-York, from the Ratification of the Federal Constitution to 1840 by Jabez D. Hammond (4th ed., Vol. 1, H. & E. Phinney, Cooperstown, 1846; page 571)
- The History of Political Parties in the State of New-York, from the Ratification of the Federal Constitution to 1840 by Jabez D. Hammond (4th ed., Vol. 2, Phinney & Co., Buffalo, 1850; pg. 85 to 97)
- Election result Assembly, Albany Co. at project "A New Nation Votes", compiled by Phil Lampi, hosted by Tufts University Digital Library
- steuben.1821 Election result Assembly, Allegany and Steuben Co. at project "A New Nation Votes"
- Election result Assembly, Broome Co. at project "A New Nation Votes"
- Election result Assembly, Cattaraugus, Chautauqua, Erie and Niagara Co. at project "A New Nation Votes"
- Partial election result Assembly, Clinton and Franklin Co. at project "A New Nation Votes" [gives only votes from Clinton Co.]
- Election result Assembly, Essex Co. at project "A New Nation Votes"
- Election result Assembly, Greene Co. at project "A New Nation Votes"
- Election result Assembly, Jefferson Co. at project "A New Nation Votes"
- Election result Assembly, Kings Co. at project "A New Nation Votes"
- Election result Assembly, Monroe Co. at project "A New Nation Votes"
- Election result Assembly, Queens Co. at project "A New Nation Votes"
- Election result Assembly, Schenectady Co. at project "A New Nation Votes"
- Election result Assembly, Schoharie Co. at project "A New Nation Votes"
- Election result Assembly, Westchester Co. at project "A New Nation Votes"
- Partial election result Senate, Southern D. at project "A New Nation Votes" [gives only votes from Kings, Queens and Westchester Co.]
- Partial election result Senate, Middle D. at project "A New Nation Votes" [gives only votes of Albany and Greene Co.]
- Partial election result Senate, Eastern D. at project "A New Nation Votes" [gives only votes from Clinton, Essex and Jefferson Co.]
- Partial election result Senate, Western D. at project "A New Nation Votes" [gives only votes of Broome, Monroe and Steuben Co.]
- Election result Speaker at project "A New Nation Votes"
- Election result Assembly Clerk at project "A New Nation Votes"
- Election result Council of Appointment at project "A New Nation Votes"
