= 44th New York State Legislature =

New York state legislative session

←	43rd	45th	→
- The Old State Capitol (1879)

Overview
- Legislative body: New York State Legislature
- Jurisdiction: New York, United States
- Term: July 1, 1820 – June 30, 1821

Senate
- Members: 32
- President: Lt. Gov. John Tayler (Clint.)
- Party control: Bucktail (19-13)

Assembly
- Members: 126
- Speaker: Peter Sharpe (Buckt.)
- Party control: Bucktail

Sessions
- 1st: November 7 – 20, 1820
- 2nd: January 9 – April 3, 1821

The 44th New York State Legislature, consisting of the New York State Senate and the New York State Assembly, met from November 7, 1820, to April 3, 1821, during the fourth year of DeWitt Clinton's governorship, in Albany.

== Background ==
Under the provisions of the New York Constitution of 1777, amended by the Constitutional Convention of 1801, 32 Senators were elected on general tickets in the four senatorial districts for four-year terms. They were divided into four classes, and every year eight Senate seats came up for election. Assemblymen were elected countywide on general tickets to a one-year term, the whole Assembly being renewed annually.

In 1797, Albany was declared the State capital, and all subsequent Legislatures have been meeting there ever since. In 1818, the Legislature enacted that future Legislatures meet on the first Tuesday of January of each year unless called earlier by the governor.

On January 18, 1820, a caucus of 64 Bucktail legislators nominated U.S. Vice President Daniel D. Tompkins for Governor and State Senator Benjamin Mooers for Lieutenant Governor. A meeting of citizens at Albany nominated Gov. DeWitt Clinton and Lt. Gov. John Tayler for re-election. The Federalists did not nominate candidates for Governor or Lieutenant Governor, and the party began to disband: the vast majority of them supported Clinton, a minority—calling themselves the "High-minded Federalists" (among them William A. Duer and John A. King)—supported Tompkins and joined the Bucktails.

At this time the politicians were divided into two opposing political parties: the Federalists and the Democratic-Republicans. The Democratic-Republican Party was split into two factions: the Clintonians (supporters of Gov. DeWitt Clinton) and the Bucktails (led by Martin Van Buren, and including the Tammany Hall organization in New York City).

== Elections ==
The State election was held from April 25 to 27, 1820. Gov. DeWitt Clinton and Lt. Gov. John Tayler were re-elected.

Senators Walter Bowne (Southern D.) and Ephraim Hart (Western D.) were re-elected. John Lefferts (Southern D.), William C. Bouck, John J. Miller, Tilly Lynde (all three Middle D.), Elijah Miles ( Western D.), and Assemblyman Oliver Forward (Western D.) were also elected to the Senate. Hart, Miles and Forward were Clintonians, the other five Bucktails.

== Sessions ==
The Legislature met at the Old State Capitol in Albany on November 7, 1820, to elect presidential electors; and adjourned on November 20.

Peter Sharpe (Buckt.) was elected Speaker with 69 votes against 52 for John C. Spencer (Clint.), the Speaker of the previous session. Dirck L. Vanderheyden was elected Clerk of the Assembly with 63 votes against 62 for the incumbent Aaron Clark.

On November 8, a Bucktail Council of Appointment was chosen, with a vote of 71 to 54. However this Council did not meet before January 1821, when the previous Council's term expired. Then they removed almost all Clintonian office-holders and appointed Bucktails instead.

On November 9, the Legislature chose 29 electors, all Bucktails: William Floyd, Henry Rutgers, Abel Huntington, Edward Leverich, Isaac Lawrence, John Targee, Jacob Odell, Peter Waring, Edward P. Livingston, David Hammond, Peter Millikin, Mark Spencer, Benjamin Knower, Gilbert Eddy, Howell Gardner, John Baker, John Walworth, Daniel McDougal, Seth Wetmore, Latham A. Burrows, Farrand Stranahan, Henry Wager, Elisha Farnham, Jonathan Collins, Samuel Nelson, William B. Rochester, Charles Thompson, Philetus Swift, James Brisban. Floyd and Wetmore did not attend the meeting of the electoral college, and Martin Van Buren and William I. Dodge were appointed to fill the vacancies. They cast their votes for James Monroe and Daniel D. Tompkins.

On November 18, the Legislature passed a bill calling for a convention with unlimited powers to amend the State Constitution. Two days later, the Council of Revision rejected the bill: Chancellor James Kent and Chief Justice Ambrose Spencer voted against it; Judges Joseph C. Yates and John Woodworth for it; and Gov. DeWitt Clinton broke the tie voting against it.

The Legislature met for the regular session on January 9, 1821, and adjourned on April 3.

At the beginning of this session, the Legislature passed a bill to submit the question, whether a Constitutional Convention should be called, to the people at the next annual State election, to be held in April 1821. The people answered in the affirmative, delegates to the New York State Constitutional Convention of 1821 were elected in June, and the Convention met from August to November 1821. The new Constitution was adopted by popular vote in January 1822.

On January 29, the Legislature appointed Benjamin Knower (Buckt.) to succeed Gerrit L. Dox as New York State Treasurer.

On February 6, the Legislature elected Martin Van Buren (Buckt.) to succeed Nathan Sanford (Clint.) as U.S. Senator from New York for a term beginning on March 4, 1821.

On March 21, the Legislature added State Senator William C. Bouck (Buckt.) to the Erie Canal Commission.

== State Senate ==
=== Districts ===
- The Southern District (6 seats) consisted of Dutchess, Kings, New York, Putnam, Queens, Richmond, Rockland, Suffolk and Westchester counties.
- The Middle District (9 seats) consisted of Albany, Chenango, Columbia, Delaware, Greene, Orange, Otsego, Schoharie, Sullivan and Ulster counties.
- The Eastern District (8 seats) consisted of Clinton, Essex, Franklin, Hamilton, Herkimer, Jefferson, Lewis, Montgomery, Rensselaer, St. Lawrence, Saratoga, Schenectady, Warren and Washington counties.
- The Western District (9 seats) consisted of Allegany, Broome, Cattaraugus, Cayuga, Chautauqua, Cortland, Genesee, Madison, Niagara, Oneida, Onondaga, Ontario, Oswego, Seneca, Steuben, Tioga and Tompkins counties.
Note: There are now 62 counties in the State of New York. The counties which are not mentioned in this list had not yet been established, or sufficiently organized, the area being included in one or more of the abovementioned counties.

=== Members ===
The asterisk (*) denotes members of the previous Legislature who continued in office as members of this Legislature. Oliver Forward changed from the Assembly to the Senate.

District	Senators	Term left	Party	Notes
Southern	Stephen Barnum*	1 year	Dem.-Rep./Bucktail	
Southern	Jonathan Dayton*	1 year	Dem.-Rep./Bucktail	
Southern	John Townsend*	2 years	Dem.-Rep./Bucktail	
Southern	Peter R. Livingston*	3 years	Dem.-Rep./Bucktail	
Southern	Walter Bowne*	4 years	Dem.-Rep./Bucktail	elected to the Council of Appointment
Southern	John Lefferts	4 years	Dem.-Rep./Bucktail	
Middle	Jabez D. Hammond*	1 year	Dem.-Rep./Clintonian	
Middle	John Lounsbery*	1 year	Dem.-Rep./Clintonian	
Middle	Moses Austin*	2 years	Dem.-Rep./Bucktail	
Middle	William Ross*	2 years	Dem.-Rep./Clintonian	
Middle	Charles E. Dudley*	3 years	Dem.-Rep./Bucktail	also Mayor of Albany
Middle	John T. More*	3 years	Dem.-Rep./Bucktail	elected to the Council of Appointment
Middle	William C. Bouck	4 years	Dem.-Rep./Bucktail	from March 21, 1821, also an Erie Canal Commissioner
Middle	Tilly Lynde	4 years	Dem.-Rep./Bucktail	
Middle	John J. Miller	4 years	Dem.-Rep./Bucktail	
Eastern	Roger Skinner*	1 year	Dem.-Rep./Bucktail	also Judge of the U.S. District Court for the Northern District of New York; elected to the Council of Appointment
Eastern	Henry Yates Jr.*	1 year	Dem.-Rep./Bucktail	
Eastern	Samuel Young*	1 year	Dem.-Rep./Bucktail	also an Erie Canal Commissioner
Eastern	Levi Adams*	2 years	Dem.-Rep./Clintonian	
Eastern	George Rosecrantz*	2 years	Dem.-Rep./Clintonian	
Eastern	Thomas Frothingham*	3 years	Dem.-Rep./Clintonian	
Eastern	Duncan McMartin Jr.*	3 years	Dem.-Rep./Clintonian	
Eastern	Benjamin Mooers*	3 years	Dem.-Rep./Bucktail	
Western	Isaac Wilson*	1 year	Dem.-Rep./Bucktail	
Western	Gamaliel H. Barstow*	2 years	Dem.-Rep./Clintonian	also First Judge of the Tioga County Court
Western	Perry G. Childs*	2 years	Dem.-Rep./Bucktail	
Western	David E. Evans*	2 years	Dem.-Rep./Bucktail	elected to the Council of Appointment
Western	Gideon Granger*	3 years	Dem.-Rep./Clintonian	resigned February/March 1821, due to ill health
Western	Lyman Paine*	3 years	Dem.-Rep./Clintonian	
Western	Ephraim Hart*	4 years	Dem.-Rep./Clintonian	
Western	Oliver Forward*	4 years	Dem.-Rep./Clintonian	
Western	Elijah Miles	4 years	Dem.-Rep./Clintonian	

=== Employees ===
- Clerk: John F. Bacon

== State Assembly ==
=== Districts ===
- Albany County (4 seats)
- Allegany and Steuben counties (2 seats)
- Broome County (1 seat)
- Cattaraugus, Chautauqua and Niagara counties (2 seats)
- Cayuga County (3 seats)
- Chenango County (3 seats)
- Clinton and Franklin counties (1 seat)
- Columbia County (4 seats)
- Cortland County (1 seat)
- Delaware County (2 seats)
- Dutchess County (5 seats)
- Essex County (1 seat)
- Genesee County (3 seats)
- Greene County (2 seats)
- Hamilton and Montgomery counties (5 seats)
- Herkimer County (3 seats)
- Jefferson County (2 seats)
- Kings County (1 seat)
- Lewis County (1 seat)
- Madison County (3 seats)
- The City and County of New York (11 seats)
- Oneida and Oswego counties (5 seats)
- Onondaga County (4 seats)
- Ontario County (7 seats)
- Orange County (4 seats)
- Otsego County (5 seats)
- Putnam County (1 seat)
- Queens County (3 seats)
- Rensselaer County (5 seats)
- Richmond County (1 seat)
- Rockland County (1 seat)
- St. Lawrence County (1 seat)
- Saratoga County (4 seats)
- Schenectady County (2 seats)
- Schoharie County (3 seats)
- Seneca County (2 seats)
- Suffolk County (3 seats)
- Sullivan and Ulster counties (4 seats)
- Tioga County (1 seat)
- Tompkins County (2 seats)
- Warren and Washington counties (5 seats)
- Westchester County (3 seats)
Note: There are now 62 counties in the State of New York. The counties which are not mentioned in this list had not yet been established, or sufficiently organized, the area being included in one or more of the abovementioned counties.

=== Assemblymen ===
The asterisk (*) denotes members of the previous Legislature who continued as members of this Legislature.

District	Assemblymen	Party	Notes
Albany	Gerrit Hogan	Federalist	
Albany	James McKown*	Federalist	
Albany	Moses Smith	Federalist	
Albany	Stephen Willes*	Federalist	
Allegany and Steuben	Clark Crandall*	Federalist	
Allegany and Steuben	John Dow*	Federalist	
Broome	Chester Patterson*	Dem.-Rep./Bucktail	
Cattaraugus, Chautauqua and Niagara	William Hotchkiss		
Cattaraugus, Chautauqua and Niagara	Jediah Prendergast	Dem.-Rep./Bucktail	
Cayuga	John Haring*		
Cayuga	Charles Kellogg	Dem.-Rep.	
Cayuga	Henry Polhemus		
Chenango	William Mason	Dem.-Rep./Clintonian	from November 10, 1820, to February 13, 1821, also Chenango County Clerk
Chenango	Edmond G. Per Lee		
Chenango	John Tracy	Dem.-Rep./Bucktail	from March 7, 1821, also Surrogate of Chenango Co.
Clinton and Franklin	Platt Newcomb*	Dem.-Rep./Clintonian	
Columbia	John Bryan		
Columbia	James Vanderpoel	Federalist	
Columbia	Elisha Williams*	Federalist	
Columbia	Isaac B. Williams		
Cortland	John Osborn		
Delaware	John H. Gregory		
Delaware	Erastus Root*	Dem.-Rep./Bucktail	
Dutchess	Albro Akin	Dem.-Rep.	
Dutchess	Benjamin H. Conklin		
Dutchess	Koert Dubois	Federalist	
Dutchess	Israel Harris		
Dutchess	Joseph J. Jackson		
Essex	Ebenezer Douglass	Dem.-Rep./Clintonian	
Genesee	Fitch Chipman*		
Genesee	Jesse Hawley		
Genesee	Samuel M. Hopkins	Federalist	
Greene	Platt Adams	Federalist	
Greene	Aaron Reed	Federalist	
Hamilton and Montgomery	David W. Candee		
Hamilton and Montgomery	Henry Failing		
Hamilton and Montgomery	Howland Fish	Dem.-Rep./Clintonian	
Hamilton and Montgomery	Lawrence Gros*	Dem.-Rep./Bucktail	
Hamilton and Montgomery	Archibald McIntyre	Dem.-Rep./Clintonian	until February 12, 1821, also New York State Comptroller
Herkimer	Simeon Ford	Federalist	also D.A. of Herkimer Co.
Herkimer	Thomas Manly	Federalist	
Herkimer	David Van Horne	Federalist	
Jefferson	Richard Goodell	Dem.-Rep./Bucktail	
Jefferson	Amos Stebbins		
Kings	Jeremiah Lott	Federalist	
Lewis	Stephen Hart		
Madison	William Berry Jr.		
Madison	Justin Dwinell	Dem.-Rep./Bucktail	
Madison	Herman Van Vleck		
New York	Clarkson Crolius*	Dem.-Rep./Bucktail	
New York	William A. Davis		
New York	Richard Hatfield*	Dem.-Rep./Bucktail	
New York	Cornelius Heeney*	Dem.-Rep./Bucktail	
New York	Robert R. Hunter*	Dem.-Rep./Bucktail	
New York	Reuben Munson*		
New York	Samuel B. Romaine*	Dem.-Rep./Bucktail	
New York	Peter Sharpe*	Dem.-Rep./Bucktail	elected Speaker
New York	John Swartwout	Dem.-Rep./Bucktail	
New York	Michael Ulshoeffer*	Dem.-Rep./Bucktail	
New York	Gulian C. Verplanck	Dem.-Rep./Bucktail	
Oneida and Oswego	Josiah Bacon		
Oneida and Oswego	Allen Fraser		
Oneida and Oswego	George Huntington*	Federalist	
Oneida and Oswego	Joseph Kirkland	Federalist	in April 1821 elected to the 17th United States Congress
Oneida and Oswego	William Root	Federalist	
Onondaga	Jonathan Denning		
Onondaga	Jonas Earll Jr.*		
Onondaga	George Pettit	Dem.-Rep.	
Onondaga	Lewis Smith*		
Ontario	Claudius V. Boughton	Dem.-Rep./Clintonian	
Ontario	William Cornwell		
Ontario	Oliver Culver		
Ontario	Truman Hart	Dem.-Rep./Clintonian	
Ontario	Myron Holley	Dem.-Rep./Clintonian	also an Erie Canal Commissioner
Ontario	John C. Spencer	Dem.-Rep./Clintonian	
Ontario	William H. Spencer		
Orange	Charles Borland Jr.		
Orange	James Burt	Fed.? Clint.?	
Orange	John Hallock Jr.		
Orange	Benjamin Woodward		
Otsego	Joshua Babcock		
Otsego	John Blakeley	Dem.-Rep./Bucktail	
Otsego	Caleb Eldred	Dem.-Rep./Bucktail	
Otsego	Stukely Ellsworth	Dem.-Rep./Bucktail	
Otsego	David Tripp		
Putnam	Elisha Brown		
Queens	John D. Hicks	Dem.-Rep./Bucktail	
Queens	John A. King*	Dem.-Rep./Bucktail	
Queens	Benjamin T. Kissam	Dem.-Rep./Bucktail	
Rensselaer	William C. Barber		
Rensselaer	Richard P. Hart		
Rensselaer	William B. Slocum		
Rensselaer	Calvin Thompson		
Rensselaer	John Van Alstyne		
Richmond	Samuel Barton	Dem.-Rep./Bucktail	
Rockland	Abraham Gurnee	Dem.-Rep./Bucktail	
St. Lawrence	Joseph York*	Dem.-Rep./Bucktail	
Saratoga	Herman Gansevoort		
Saratoga	John House		
Saratoga	Zebulon Mott		
Saratoga	John Rogers		
Schenectady	Richard McMichael	Dem.-Rep./Bucktail	
Schenectady	Gerrit S. Veeder	Dem.-Rep./Bucktail	
Schoharie	Barnabas Eldredge	Dem.-Rep./Bucktail	
Schoharie	Abraham Keyser Jr.	Dem.-Rep./Bucktail	
Schoharie	Freegift Patchin	Dem.-Rep./Bucktail	
Seneca	Robert S. Rose*	Dem.-Rep./Bucktail	
Seneca	William Thompson	Dem.-Rep./Bucktail	
Suffolk	Isaac Conklin	Dem.-Rep./Bucktail	
Suffolk	John B. Osborn	Dem.-Rep./Bucktail	
Suffolk	John M. Williamson		
Sullivan and Ulster	Coenrad Bevier	Dem.-Rep./Bucktail	
Sullivan and Ulster	William G. Gillespie	Dem.-Rep./Bucktail	
Sullivan and Ulster	Wells Lake	Dem.-Rep./Bucktail	
Sullivan and Ulster	Jacob Snyder*	Dem.-Rep./Bucktail	
Tioga	Samuel Lawrence	Dem.-Rep.	previously a member from New York Co.
Tompkins	Samuel Crittenden		
Tompkins	Peter Hager 2d	Dem.-Rep./Bucktail	
Warren and Washington	Wadsworth Bull		
Warren and Washington	James Mallory		
Warren and Washington	John Moss		
Warren and Washington	William Richards		
Warren and Washington	James L. Thurman		
Westchester	James Guyon*	Dem.-Rep./Bucktail	
Westchester	Abraham Miller*	Dem.-Rep./Bucktail	
Westchester	William Nelson*	Dem.-Rep./Bucktail	

=== Employees ===
- Clerk: Dirck L. Vanderheyden
- Sergeant-at-Arms: Henry Fryer
- Doorkeeper: Henry Bates
- Assistant Doorkeeper: Willard Smith

== Sources ==
- The New York Civil List compiled by Franklin Benjamin Hough (Weed, Parsons and Co., 1858) [see pg. 108f for Senate districts; pg. 124 for senators; pg. 148f for Assembly districts; pg. 196f for assemblymen; pg. 321 and 326 for presidential election]
- The History of Political Parties in the State of New-York, from the Ratification of the Federal Constitution to 1840 by Jabez D. Hammond (4th ed., Vol. 1, H. & E. Phinney, Cooperstown, 1846; pages 531-570)
- Election result Assembly, Albany Co. at project "A New Nation Votes", compiled by Phil Lampi, hosted by Tufts University Digital Library
- Partial election result Assembly, Allegany and Steuben Co. at project "A New Nation Votes" [gives only votes of Allegany Co.]
- Partial election result Assembly, Allegany and Steuben Co. at project "A New Nation Votes" [gives only votes of Steuben Co.]
- Election result Assembly, Broome Co. at project "A New Nation Votes"
- Partial election result Assembly, Cattaraugus, Chautauqua and Niagara Co. at project "A New Nation Votes" [gives only votes from Cattaraugus Co.]
- Partial election result Assembly, Cattaraugus, Chautauqua and Niagara Co. at project "A New Nation Votes" [gives only votes from Chautauqua Co.]
- Partial election result Assembly, Cattaraugus, Chautauqua and Niagara Co. at project "A New Nation Votes" [gives only votes from Niagara Co.]
- Election result Assembly, Greene Co. at project "A New Nation Votes"
- Election result Assembly, Kings Co. at project "A New Nation Votes"
- Election result Assembly, Putnam Co. at project "A New Nation Votes"
- Election result Assembly, Queens Co. at project "A New Nation Votes"
- Election result Assembly, Richmond Co. at project "A New Nation Votes"
- Election result Assembly, St. Lawrence Co. at project "A New Nation Votes"
- Election result Assembly, Schenectady Co. at project "A New Nation Votes"
- Election result Assembly, Schoharie Co. at project "A New Nation Votes"
- Election result Assembly, Sullivan and Ulster Co. at project "A New Nation Votes"
- Partial election result Senate, Southern D. at project "A New Nation Votes" [gives only votes from Kings, Putnam, Queens and Richmond Co.]
- Partial election result Senate, Middle D. at project "A New Nation Votes" [gives only votes of Greene, Schoharie, Sullivan and Ulster Co.]
- Partial election result Senate, Western D. at project "A New Nation Votes" [gives only votes of Allegany, Broome, Cattaraugus and Steuben Co.]
- Election result Speaker at project "A New Nation Votes"
- Election result Assembly Clerk at project "A New Nation Votes"
- Election result Council of Appointment at project "A New Nation Votes"
