= 42nd New York State Legislature =

New York state legislative session

| ← | 41st | 43rd | → |
- The Old State Capitol (1879)

Overview
- Legislative body: New York State Legislature
- Jurisdiction: New York, United States
- Term: July 1, 1818 – June 30, 1819

Senate
- Members: 32
- President: Lt. Gov. John Tayler (Dem.-Rep.)
- Party control: Bucktail plurality

Assembly
- Members: 126
- Speaker: Obadiah German (Clint.)
- Party control: Clintonian plurality

Sessions
- 1st: January 5 – April 13, 1819

The 42nd New York State Legislature, consisting of the New York State Senate and the New York State Assembly, met from January 5 to April 13, 1819, during the second year of term of DeWitt Clinton's governorship, in Albany.

== Background ==
Under the provisions of the New York Constitution of 1777, amended by the Constitutional Convention of 1801, 32 Senators were elected on general tickets in the four senatorial districts for four-year terms. They were divided into four classes, and every year eight Senate seats came up for election. Assemblymen were elected countywide on general tickets to a one-year term, the whole Assembly being renewed annually.

In 1797, Albany was declared the State capital, and all subsequent Legislatures have been meeting there ever since. In 1818, the Legislature enacted that future Legislatures meet on the first Tuesday of January of each year unless called earlier by the governor.

In 1816, Hamilton County was split from Montgomery County, but both remained together in one Assembly district. Also in 1816, Oswego County was formed from parts of Oneida and Onondaga counties, and Oswego and Oneida remained together in one Assembly district.

In 1818, Joseph Ellicott resigned from the Erie Canal Commission, due to ill health. On June 18, during the recess of the Legislature, Gov. DeWitt Clinton appointed State Senator Ephraim Hart to fill the vacancy temporarily.

At this time the politicians were divided into two opposing political parties: the Federalists and the Democratic-Republicans. The Democratic-Republican Party was split into two factions: the Clintonians (supporters of Gov. DeWitt Clinton and his Erie Canal project) and the Bucktails (led by Att. Gen. Martin Van Buren, and including the Tammany Hall organization in New York City).

== Elections ==
The State election was held from April 28 to 30, 1818. Senators Darius Crosby (Southern D.) and William Ross (Middle D.) were re-elected. Moses Austin (Middle D.), Levi Adams (Eastern D.), Perry G. Childs, David E. Evans (both Western D.), and Assemblymen George Rosecrantz (Eastern D.) and Gamaliel H. Barstow (Western D.) were also elected to the Senate.

== Sessions ==
The Legislature met at the Old State Capitol in Albany on January 5, 1819, and adjourned on April 13.

On January 4, a Democratic-Republican Assembly caucus met to nominate a candidate for Speaker. 75 members attended, including almost all Bucktails elected, but 10 to 15 Clintonians had not arrived yet. William Thompson (Bucktail) received 42 votes, Obadiah German (Clintonian) 33. The Clintonians refused to "make the nomination unanimous", and refused to support Thompson in the Assembly on the next day.

On January 5, the Assembly met and took four ballots for Speaker without anybody receiving a majority, and adjourned.

On January 6, the vote on the fifth ballot stood: German 55, Thompson 38, William A. Duer (Fed.) 20. Then Erastus Root offered a resolution that Thompson be appointed Speaker which was lost with a vote of 41 to 73. Then a resolution was offered that Duer be appointed Speaker which was lost too, with a vote of 31 to 84. Then a resolution was offered that German be appointed Speaker which was adopted with a vote of 67 to 48.

The refusal of the Clintonians to support the caucus nominee for Speaker led to the permanent split of the New York Democratic-Republicans into Clintonians and Bucktails. The last time both factions caucused together was when a candidate for U.S. Senator was to be nominated, and the meeting broke up after much mutual verbal abuse without having had any ballot. At the same time, the Federalists were split into a Pro-Clinton majority (led by Thomas J. Oakley) and an Anti-Clinton minority (led by William A. Duer).

On February 7, the Legislature failed to elect a successor for U.S. Senator Rufus King (Fed.) and the seat became vacant on March 4. The vote stood: in the Senate, State Senator Samuel Young (Buckt.) 13, Congressman John C. Spencer (Clint.) 10 and the incumbent King 4; in the Assembly, Spencer 51, Young 43 and King 28.

On February 8, Erastus Root (Buckt.) offered a resolution for the call of a State "Convention with unlimited powers to revise, alter or modify the Constitution." After much debate, this resolution was rejected, like a similar one during the previous session, but the issue was pursued further by the Bucktails, and led to the New York State Constitutional Convention of 1821, and a new Constitution.

On March 24, the Legislature rejected the recess appointment of Ephraim Hart (Clint.) as Erie Canal Commissioner, and elected State Senator Henry Seymour (Buckt.) to fill the vacancy caused by the resignation of Joseph Ellicott. Seymour was chosen by joint ballot of the Legislature with a majority of a single vote. This gave the Bucktails a majority of 3 to 2 in the commission, and instead of opposing the Canal project itself, the Bucktails now—the construction being well under way—supported it, for both political and financial reasons.

== State Senate ==
=== Districts ===
- The Southern District (6 seats) consisted of Dutchess, Kings, New York, Putnam, Queens, Richmond, Rockland, Suffolk and Westchester counties.
- The Middle District (9 seats) consisted of Albany, Chenango, Columbia, Delaware, Greene, Orange, Otsego, Schoharie, Sullivan and Ulster counties.
- The Eastern District (8 seats) consisted of Clinton, Essex, Franklin, Hamilton, Herkimer, Jefferson, Lewis, Montgomery, Rensselaer, St. Lawrence, Saratoga, Schenectady, Warren and Washington counties.
- The Western District (9 seats) consisted of Allegany, Broome, Cattaraugus, Cayuga, Chautauqua, Cortland, Genesee, Madison, Niagara, Oneida, Onondaga, Ontario, Oswego, Seneca, Steuben, Tioga and Tompkins counties.
Note: There are now 62 counties in the State of New York. The counties which are not mentioned in this list had not yet been established, or sufficiently organized, the area being included in one or more of the abovementioned counties.

=== Members ===
The asterisk (*) denotes members of the previous Legislature who continued in office as members of this Legislature. George Rosecrantz and Gamaliel H. Barstow changed from the Assembly to the Senate.

| District | Senators | Term left | Party | Notes |
|---|---|---|---|---|
| Southern | Peter R. Livingston* | 1 year | Dem.-Rep./Bucktail | |
| Southern | Walter Bowne* | 2 years | Dem.-Rep./Bucktail | |
| Southern | John D. Ditmis* | 2 years | Dem.-Rep./Bucktail | |
| Southern | Stephen Barnum* | 3 years | Dem.-Rep./Bucktail | elected to the Council of Appointment |
| Southern | Jonathan Dayton* | 3 years | Dem.-Rep./Bucktail | |
| Southern | (Darius Crosby*) | 4 years | Dem.-Rep./Bucktail | died November 18, 1818, before the Legislature met |
| Middle | Isaac Ogden* | 1 year | Dem.-Rep./Bucktail | |
| Middle | Abraham Van Vechten* | 1 year | Federalist | |
| Middle | John Noyes* | 2 years | Dem.-Rep./Clintonian | |
| Middle | Peter Swart* | 2 years | Dem.-Rep./Clintonian | |
| Middle | Martin Van Buren* | 2 years | Dem.-Rep./Bucktail | also New York Attorney General |
| Middle | Jabez D. Hammond* | 3 years | Dem.-Rep./Clintonian | |
| Middle | John Lounsbery* | 3 years | Dem.-Rep./Clintonian | |
| Middle | Moses Austin | 4 years | Dem.-Rep./Bucktail | |
| Middle | William Ross* | 4 years | Dem.-Rep./Clintonian | elected to the Council of Appointment |
| Eastern | David Allen* | 1 year | Federalist | |
| Eastern | Henry J. Frey* | 1 year | Federalist | |
| Eastern | Ralph Hascall* | 1 year | Federalist | also D.A. of Essex Co. |
| Eastern | Roger Skinner* | 3 years | Dem.-Rep./Bucktail | also U.S. Attorney for the Northern District of New York |
| Eastern | Henry Yates Jr.* | 3 years | Dem.-Rep./Bucktail | |
| Eastern | Samuel Young* | 3 years | Dem.-Rep./Bucktail | also an Erie Canal Commissioner |
| Eastern | Levi Adams | 4 years | Dem.-Rep./Clintonian | |
| Eastern | George Rosecrantz* | 4 years | Dem.-Rep./Clintonian | elected to the Council of Appointment |
| Western | Stephen Bates* | 1 year | Dem.-Rep./Clintonian | elected to the Council of Appointment |
| Western | Henry Seymour* | 1 year | Dem.-Rep./Bucktail | from March 24, 1819, also an Erie Canal Commissioner |
| Western | Ephraim Hart* | 2 years | Dem.-Rep./Clintonian | until March 24, 1819, also an Erie Canal Commissioner |
| Western | John Knox* | 2 years | Dem.-Rep./Bucktail | |
| Western | William Mallery* | 2 years | Dem.-Rep. | |
| Western | Isaac Wilson* | 3 years | Dem.-Rep./Bucktail | |
| Western | Gamaliel H. Barstow* | 4 years | Dem.-Rep./Clintonian | also First Judge of the Tioga County Court |
| Western | Perry G. Childs | 4 years | Dem.-Rep./Bucktail | |
| Western | David E. Evans | 4 years | Dem.-Rep./Bucktail | |

=== Employees ===
- Clerk: John F. Bacon

== State Assembly ==
=== Districts ===
- Albany County (4 seats)
- Allegany and Steuben counties (2 seats)
- Broome County (1 seat)
- Cattaraugus, Chautauqua and Niagara counties (2 seats)
- Cayuga County (3 seats)
- Chenango County (3 seats)
- Clinton and Franklin counties (1 seat)
- Columbia County (4 seats)
- Cortland County (1 seat)
- Delaware County (2 seats)
- Dutchess County (5 seats)
- Essex County (1 seat)
- Genesee County (3 seats)
- Greene County (2 seats)
- Hamilton and Montgomery counties (5 seats)
- Herkimer County (3 seats)
- Jefferson County (2 seats)
- Kings County (1 seat)
- Lewis County (1 seat)
- Madison County (3 seats)
- The City and County of New York (11 seats)
- Oneida and Oswego counties (5 seats)
- Onondaga County (4 seats)
- Ontario County (7 seats)
- Orange County (4 seats)
- Otsego County (5 seats)
- Putnam County (1 seat)
- Queens County (3 seats)
- Rensselaer County (5 seats)
- Richmond County (1 seat)
- Rockland County (1 seat)
- St. Lawrence County (1 seat)
- Saratoga County (4 seats)
- Schenectady County (2 seats)
- Schoharie County (3 seats)
- Seneca County (2 seats)
- Suffolk County (3 seats)
- Sullivan and Ulster counties (4 seats)
- Tioga County (1 seat)
- Tompkins County (2 seats)
- Warren and Washington counties (5 seats)
- Westchester County (3 seats)
Note: There are now 62 counties in the State of New York. The counties which are not mentioned in this list had not yet been established, or sufficiently organized, the area being included in one or more of the abovementioned counties.

=== Assemblymen ===
The asterisk (*) denotes members of the previous Legislature who continued as members of this Legislature.

| District | Assemblymen | Party | Notes |
|---|---|---|---|
| Albany | William A. Duer* | Federalist | leader of the Anti-Clintonian Federalists |
| Albany | William D. Houghtaling | Federalist | |
| Albany | Cornelius H. Waldron | Federalist | |
| Albany | John Van Ness Yates | Dem.-Rep. | also Secretary of State of New York |
| Allegany and Steuben | John Dow | Federalist | |
| Allegany and Steuben | James McCall* | Dem.-Rep./Bucktail | |
| Broome | Chester Patterson | Dem.-Rep./Bucktail | |
| Cattaraugus, Chautauqua and Niagara | Philo Orton | | |
| Cattaraugus, Chautauqua and Niagara | Isaac Phelps* | | |
| Cayuga | William Allen | | |
| Cayuga | Elijah Devoe | | |
| Cayuga | Henry Polhemus | | |
| Chenango | Obadiah German | Dem.-Rep./Clintonian | elected Speaker |
| Chenango | Thomas Humphrey | Dem.-Rep./Bucktail | |
| Chenango | Ebenezer Wakley | Dem.-Rep. | |
| Clinton and Franklin | Ebenezer Brownson | | |
| Columbia | Henry Livingston | Federalist | |
| Columbia | Jonathan Lapham | Federalist | |
| Columbia | Barent Van Buren | Federalist | |
| Columbia | Jacob R. Van Rensselaer | Federalist | |
| Cortland | Joseph Reynolds | Dem.-Rep./Bucktail | |
| Delaware | James Ells | Dem.-Rep./Bucktail | |
| Delaware | Erastus Root* | Dem.-Rep./Bucktail | |
| Dutchess | John Beadle | Federalist | |
| Dutchess | James Ketchum | Federalist | |
| Dutchess | Thomas J. Oakley* | Federalist | leader of the Pro-Clintonian Federalists |
| Dutchess | Jesse Thompson | Federalist | |
| Dutchess | David Tomlinson | Federalist | |
| Essex | John Hoffnagle* | Dem.-Rep./Clintonian | |
| Genesee | Gilbert Howell* | Dem.-Rep./Bucktail | |
| Genesee | Abraham Matteson* | | |
| Genesee | Isaac Sutherland* | | |
| Greene | James G. Foster | Dem.-Rep./Bucktail | contested by Platt Adams (Fed.) who withdrew his claim |
| Greene | Isaac Van Loon | Federalist | |
| Hamilton and Montgomery | Robert Hall | | |
| Hamilton and Montgomery | Jacob Hees | Dem.-Rep./Bucktail | |
| Hamilton and Montgomery | Aaron Haring | Dem.-Rep. | |
| Hamilton and Montgomery | Samuel Jackson* | Dem.-Rep. | |
| Hamilton and Montgomery | Duncan McMartin Jr. | Dem.-Rep./Clintonian | |
| Herkimer | Jonas Cleland | Dem.-Rep./Bucktail | |
| Herkimer | Nicoll Fosdick* | Dem.-Rep./Bucktail | |
| Herkimer | Henry Gros | Dem.-Rep. | |
| Jefferson | George Brown Jr. | | |
| Jefferson | John Cowles | | |
| Kings | Teunis Schenck | Dem.-Rep./Bucktail | |
| Lewis | Levi Robbins | | |
| Madison | Solomon Beebe | Dem.-Rep./Bucktail | |
| Madison | Thomas Greenly* | | |
| Madison | Dennis Palmer | | |
| New York | Clarkson Crolius* | Dem.-Rep./Bucktail | |
| New York | Alexander Hamilton | Dem.-Rep./Bucktail | |
| New York | Richard Hatfield | Dem.-Rep./Bucktail | |
| New York | Cornelius Heeney* | Dem.-Rep./Bucktail | |
| New York | Robert R. Hunter* | Dem.-Rep./Bucktail | |
| New York | John T. Irving | Dem.-Rep./Bucktail | |
| New York | John J. Morgan | Dem.-Rep./Bucktail | |
| New York | Samuel B. Romaine | Dem.-Rep./Bucktail | |
| New York | Peter Sharpe* | Dem.-Rep./Bucktail | |
| New York | Michael Ulshoeffer* | Dem.-Rep./Bucktail | |
| New York | Samuel Watkins | Dem.-Rep./Bucktail | |
| Oneida and Oswego | Ezekiel Bacon | Dem.-Rep./Clintonian | |
| Oneida and Oswego | Luther Guiteau | | |
| Oneida and Oswego | David P. Hoyt | | |
| Oneida and Oswego | George Huntington | Federalist | |
| Oneida and Oswego | Theor Woodruffe* | | |
| Onondaga | Henry Case | Dem.-Rep./Bucktail | |
| Onondaga | Elisha Litchfield | Dem.-Rep./Bucktail | |
| Onondaga | David Munro* | Dem.-Rep./Bucktail | |
| Onondaga | Nathan Williams | Dem.-Rep./Bucktail | |
| Ontario | William Billinghurst | | |
| Ontario | Byram Green | | |
| Ontario | Eli Hill | Dem.-Rep./Bucktail | |
| Ontario | William McCartney | | |
| Ontario | Elijah Spencer | Dem.-Rep./Bucktail | |
| Ontario | John A. Stevens | | |
| Ontario | Asahel Warner | Dem.-Rep. | |
| Orange | John Blake | Dem.-Rep./Clintonian | |
| Orange | Nathaniel P. Hill | Dem.-Rep./Bucktail | |
| Orange | Hezekiah Moffat | Dem.-Rep. | |
| Orange | Andrew Wilson | Dem.-Rep. | |
| Otsego | John Blakeley | Dem.-Rep./Bucktail | |
| Otsego | Seth Chase | | |
| Otsego | Caleb Eldred | Dem.-Rep./Bucktail | |
| Otsego | Thomas Howes | Dem.-Rep./Bucktail | |
| Otsego | William Nichols | Dem.-Rep./Bucktail | |
| Putnam | Hart Weed | Dem.-Rep./Bucktail | |
| Queens | Stephen Carman* | Federalist | |
| Queens | John A. King | Federalist | |
| Queens | Daniel Kissam* | Federalist | |
| Rensselaer | George R. Davis | Federalist | |
| Rensselaer | Andrew Finch* | Federalist | |
| Rensselaer | Henry Platt | Federalist | |
| Rensselaer | Daniel Simmons | Federalist | |
| Rensselaer | Stephen Warren | Federalist | |
| Richmond | Harmanus Guyon | Federalist | |
| Rockland | Abraham Gurnee* | Dem.-Rep./Bucktail | |
| St. Lawrence | Joseph York | Dem.-Rep. | |
| Saratoga | Abner Carpenter | | |
| Saratoga | William Hamilton | Federalist | |
| Saratoga | Joel Keeler | | |
| Saratoga | John Rogers Jr. | | |
| Schenectady | James Frost | Dem.-Rep./Bucktail | |
| Schenectady | Simon A. Groot | Dem.-Rep./Bucktail | |
| Schoharie | Aaron Hubbard | | |
| Schoharie | Jedediah Miller | Dem.-Rep./Clintonian | |
| Schoharie | Peter Swart Jr. | Dem.-Rep./Clintonian | |
| Seneca | William Thompson* | Dem.-Rep./Bucktail | |
| Seneca | Ananias Wells | Dem.-Rep./Bucktail | |
| Suffolk | Isaac Conklin | Dem.-Rep./Bucktail | |
| Suffolk | John P. Osborn* | Dem.-Rep./Bucktail | |
| Suffolk | Daniel Youngs | Dem.-Rep./Bucktail | |
| Sullivan and Ulster | Daniel Clark | Dem.-Rep./Bucktail | |
| Sullivan and Ulster | John Crispell | | |
| Sullivan and Ulster | Joseph Deyo | Dem.-Rep./Bucktail | |
| Sullivan and Ulster | Elisha Ostrander | | |
| Tioga | Henry Wells | | |
| Tompkins | Samuel Crittenden* | | |
| Tompkins | John Sutton* | | |
| Warren and Washington | William K. Adams | | |
| Warren and Washington | John Doty | | |
| Warren and Washington | Norman Fox | Dem.-Rep./Clintonian | |
| Warren and Washington | John Gale | Dem.-Rep./Bucktail | |
| Warren and Washington | William McFarland | | |
| Westchester | William Barker* | Federalist | |
| Westchester | James Guyon | Dem.-Rep./Bucktail | |
| Westchester | William Requa* | Federalist | |

=== Employees ===
- Clerk: Aaron Clark
- Sergeant-at-Arms: Caleb Benjamin
- Doorkeeper: Benjamin Whipple

== Sources ==
- The New York Civil List compiled by Franklin Benjamin Hough (Weed, Parsons and Co., 1858) [see pg. 108f for Senate districts; pg. 123 for senators; pg. 148f for Assembly districts; pg. 194f for assemblymen]
- The History of Political Parties in the State of New-York, from the Ratification of the Federal Constitution to 1840 by Jabez D. Hammond (4th ed., Vol. 1, H. & E. Phinney, Cooperstown, 1846; pages 470-502)
- Election result Assembly, Albany Co. at project "A New Nation Votes", compiled by Phil Lampi, hosted by Tufts University Digital Library
- Election result Assembly, Broome Co. at project "A New Nation Votes"
- Partial election result Assembly, Clinton and Franklin Co. at project "A New Nation Votes" [gives only vote of Clinton Co.]
- Election result Assembly, Dutchess Co. at project "A New Nation Votes"
- Partial election result Assembly, Greene Co. at project "A New Nation Votes"
- Election result Assembly, Hamilton and Montgomery Co. at project "A New Nation Votes"
- Election result Assembly, Kings Co. at project "A New Nation Votes"
- Election result Assembly, Onondaga Co. at project "A New Nation Votes" [gives doubtful result, does not mention Williams]
- Election result Assembly, Orange Co. at project "A New Nation Votes"
- Election result Assembly, Richmond Co. at project "A New Nation Votes"
- Election result Assembly, St. Lawrence Co. at project "A New Nation Votes"
- Election result Assembly, Schenectady Co. at project "A New Nation Votes"
- Election result Assembly, Suffolk Co. at project "A New Nation Votes"
- Election result Assembly, Tompkins Co. at project "A New Nation Votes"
- Election result Assembly, Westchester Co. at project "A New Nation Votes"
- Partial election result Senate, Southern D. at project "A New Nation Votes" [gives only votes from Dutchess, Kings, Putnam, Richmond, Suffolk and Westchester Co.]
- Partial election result Senate, Middle D. at project "A New Nation Votes" [gives only votes from Albany, Greene and Orange Co.]
- Partial election result Senate, Eastern D. at project "A New Nation Votes" [gives only votes from St. Lawrence Co.]
- Partial election result Senate, Western D. at project "A New Nation Votes" [gives only votes of Broome, Onondaga and Tompkins Co.]
- Election result, Speaker at project "A New Nation Votes"
- Election result, Council of Appointment at project "A New Nation Votes"
- Election result, U.S. Senator at project "A New Nation Votes"
