= Samuel M. Hopkins =

American politician (1772–1837)

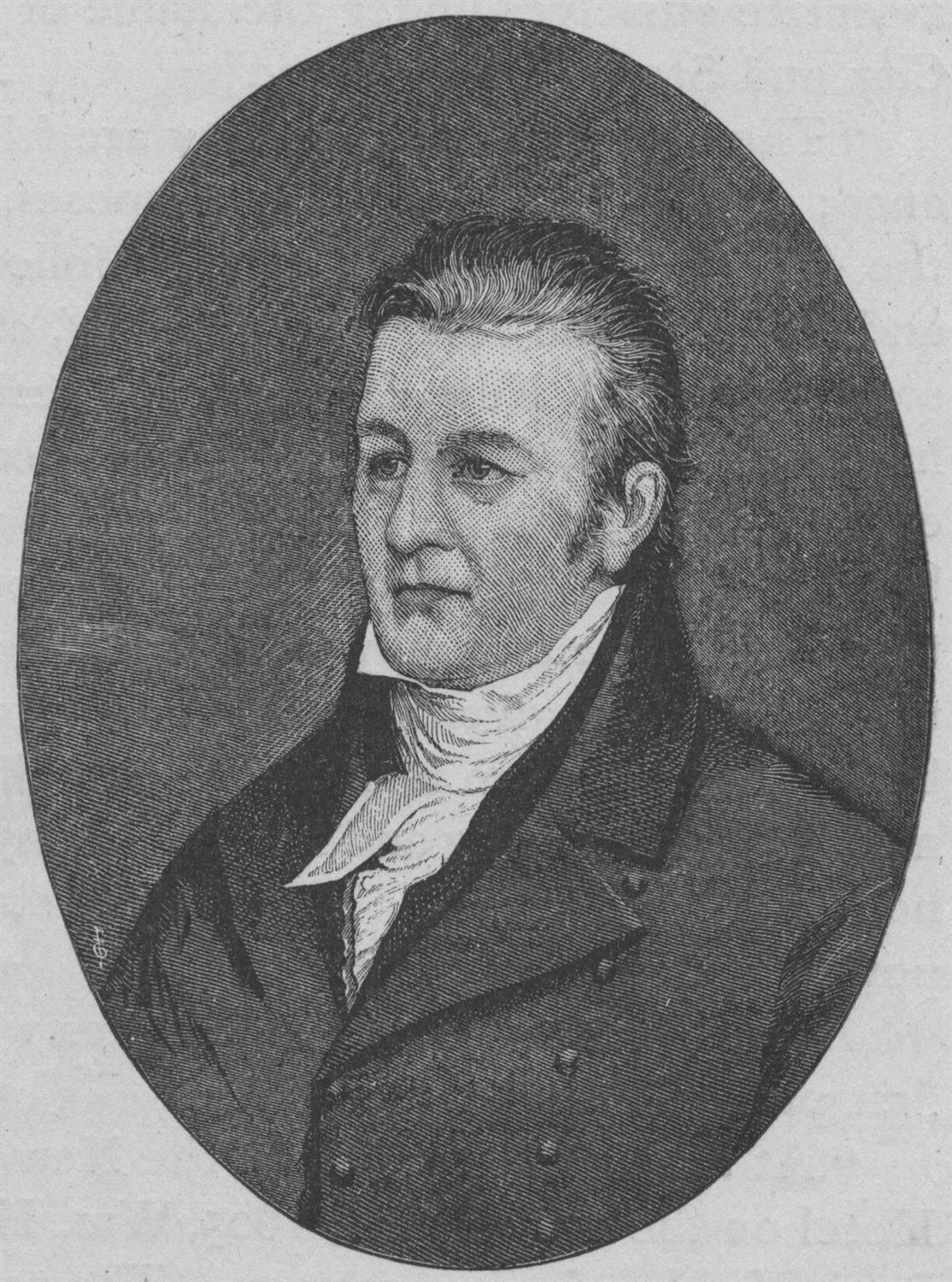
- From a painting by John Trumbull

Member of the U.S. House of Representatives from New York's 21st district
- In office March 4, 1813 – March 3, 1815 Serving with Nathaniel W. Howell
- Preceded by: District established
- Succeeded by: Micah Brooks, Peter B. Porter

Member of the New York State Senate
- In office July 1, 1821 – December 31, 1822 Serving with Gamaliel H. Barstow, Perry G. Childs, David E. Evans, Lyman Paine, Henry Seymour, Ephraim Hart, Oliver Forward, Elijah Miles
- Preceded by: Isaac Wilson, Gamaliel H. Barstow, Perry G. Childs, David E. Evans, Gideon Granger, Lyman Paine, Ephraim Hart, Oliver Forward, Elijah Miles
- Succeeded by: None (Senate reorganized, new districts created)
- Constituency: Western District

Member of the New York State Assembly
- In office July 1, 1820 – June 30, 1821 Serving with Fitch Chipman, Jesse Hawley
- Preceded by: Fitch Chipman, Gideon T. Jenkins, Robert McKay
- Succeeded by: Robert Anderson, Benedict Brooks, Samuel McWhorter
- Constituency: Genesee County

Personal details
- Born: May 9, 1772 Salem, Connecticut, U.S.
- Died: October 8, 1837 (aged 65) Geneva, New York, U.S.
- Resting place: Washington Street Cemetery, Geneva, New York, U.S.
- Party: Federalist
- Spouse: Sarah Elizabeth Rogers (m. 1800)
- Children: 7
- Education: Yale College; Litchfield Law School
- Profession: Attorney

Samuel Miles Hopkins (May 9, 1772 – October 8, 1837) was an American attorney and politician from New York. A Federalist, he served in the United States House of Representatives from 1813 to 1815, the New York State Assembly from 1820 to 1821, and the New York State Senate from 1821 to 1822.

A native of Salem, Connecticut, Hopkins attended Yale College and the Litchfield Law School, attained admission to the bar in 1793, and became an attorney in New York. During his career, Hopkins practiced in New York City, Geneseo, and Albany before retiring to Geneva. In addition to practicing law, Hopkins farmed and raised livestock for several years. He also became involved in politics as a member of the Federalist Party, and he served several terms on New York City's common council.

Hopkins served in Congress from 1813 to 1815. He later served a term in the New York State Assembly (1820–1821), and a partial term in the New York State Senate (1821–1822). In the early 1830s, Hopkins's wife received an inheritance that enabled them to retire, and they became residents of Geneva. He died in Geneva on October 8, 1837 and was buried at Washington Street Cemetery in Geneva.

== Early life ==
Samuel M. Hopkins was born in Salem, Connecticut on May 9, 1772, one of six children born to Samuel Hopkins (1748–1818), a farmer, legislator, and militia veteran of the American Revolutionary War and Mary (Miles) Hopkins (1753–1811). He was raised in Salem and in Goshen before boarding with a family in Watertown so he could attend school there. In 1784, he began residing in Hartford with his uncle Dr. Lemuel Hopkins, so he could attend the Free Grammar School and begin training for a career in medicine.

In 1787, Hopkins was admitted to the sophomore class at Yale College. He attended for three years and was scheduled to graduate in 1791, but disagreements with members of the faculty caused him to decline to attend the ceremony, so he did not receive his diploma. After leaving Yale, Hopkins decided on a career as a lawyer and began attendance at Litchfield Law School. He was admitted to the bar of Connecticut in March 1793 and moved to Poughkeepsie, New York to continue the study of law with attorneys James Kent and Jacob Radcliff. With four other prospective attorneys, Hopkins was admitted to the New York bar in May 1793, with Aaron Burr serving as their sponsor before the examining committee.

== Start of career ==
After attaining admission to the New York bar, Hopkins settled in Oxford, New York, where he began to practice law. In 1794, Hopkins moved to New York City to continue practicing law. He resided at the home of James Watson and his office included a law library of books chosen by Burr, which Burr presented as a gift. Hopkins subsequently accepted an offer to aid Watson in land speculation, and spent time in Virginia and England researching land grants and attempting to obtain titles.

At the conclusion of his work for Watson, Hopkins and several acquaintances including William Tudor remained in England as tourists and also visited Ireland. During their travels, they met several prominent individuals, including William Herschel and Arthur Browne. Hopkins went on to visit Scotland, Belgium, France, and the Netherlands, and he returned to the United States in June 1798. Upon reaching New York, he was selected to serve as secretary for the state commissioners appointed to collect a recently enacted direct federal tax, and the commissioners delegated to Hopkins the devising of a system for assessing the amounts to be paid, appealing the assessments, collecting the tax, and turning collections over to the Department of the Treasury.

== Continued career ==
In the fall of 1798, Hopkins succeeded to the law practice of New York City attorney Michael D. Henry, who was terminally ill with tuberculosis. He also became active in politics as a Federalist, and served several terms on the city's common council. In 1811, Hopkins moved to the portion of Geneseo that is now Leicester, where continued the practice of law. In addition to his law practice, Hopkins operated a farm and engaged in livestock breeding and raising, primarily sheep. He was an early promoter of the Genesee County Agricultural Society, and served as its president.

Hopkins was elected as a Federalist to the Thirteenth Congress, holding office from March 4, 1813 to March 3, 1815. He was a member of the New York State Assembly (Genesee Co.) from 1820 to 1821, and the New York State Senate (Western D.) from 1821 to 1822. In the spring of 1822, Hopkins sold his Geneseo property and moved to Albany, New York, where he continued the practice of law. From 1823 to 1826, he was Reporter of the New York Court of Chancery. He was a member of the commission to superintend the construction of Sing Sing Prison from 1825 to 1830.

In 1828, Yale University awarded Hopkins the honorary degree of LL.D. In the late 1820s and early 1830s, Hopkins was involved in the Anti-Masonic movement. He also became active in other reform causes, including Temperance and the movement to end slavery and promote African colonization.

In 1831, Hopkins's wife received an inheritance from her father's estate which enabled Hopkins to retire, and they moved to Geneva, New York. From 1832 to 1837, he was a member of the Auburn Theological Seminary board of trustees. Hopkins died in Geneva on October 8, 1837. He was buried at Washington Street Cemetery in Geneva.

== Family ==
In 1800, Hopkins married Sarah Elizabeth Rogers of New York City. They were the parents of seven children:

- Mary Elizabeth (1802–1857), the wife of William Gordon Ver Planck
- William Rogers (1805–1876), a professor at the United States Naval Academy
- Julia Anne (1807–1849), the wife of William E. Sill
- Hester Rogers (1808–1845), the wife of Charles A. Rose
- Samuel Miles (1813–1901), a professor at Auburn Theological Seminary
- Woolsey Rogers (1815–1909), civil engineer and Union Army officer in the American Civil War
- Sarah Elizabeth (1818–1912), author and the wife of John M. Bradford

U.S. House of Representatives
New district	Member of the U.S. House of Representatives from New York's 21st congressional district 1813–1815 with Nathaniel W. Howell	Succeeded by Micah Brooks, Peter B. Porter
