= Jonas Earll Jr. =

American politician

Jonas Earll Jr. (1786 – October 28, 1846, in Syracuse, New York) was an American politician. He was a U.S. representative from New York from 1827 to 1831.

== Life ==
He was the son of Jonas Earll and Experience (Sprague) Earll. He was probably born at Whitehall, Washington County, New York. The family appears in a census taken in 1790 at Granville in Washington Co.

=== Early political career ===
Earll Jr. was Sheriff of Onondaga County from 1815 to 1819. He was a member of the New York State Assembly (Onondaga Co.) in 1820 and 1820-21. He was a member of the New York State Senate (7th D.) from 1823 to 1826.

=== Congress ===
Earll Jr. was elected as a Jacksonian to the 20th and 21st United States Congresses, holding office from March 4, 1827, to March 3, 1831. He was Chairman of the House Committee on Expenditures in the Department of State (21st Congress).

=== State legislature ===
In May 1831, Earll Jr. was appointed by Governor Enos T. Throop as a Canal Commissioner, to fill the vacancy caused by the resignation of Henry Seymour.

In January 1832 was elected by the New York State Legislature to succeed himself. He remained in office until February 1840 when the new Whig majority removed all Democratic commissioners.

=== Later career and death ===
He was Postmaster of Syracuse, New York, from June 26, 1840, to March 10, 1842.

In February 1842, the State Legislature removed the Whig commissioners, and Earll Jr. was again elected one of the canal commissioners. In November 1844, he was one of the first canal commissioners elected by general ballot. He drew a two-year term and died in office on October 28, 1846.

He was buried at the Walnut Grove Cemetery in Onondaga Hill, New York.

=== Family ===
Congressman Nehemiah H. Earll was his cousin.

== Sources ==
- United States Congress. "Jonas Earll Jr. (id: E000011)". Biographical Directory of the United States Congress.
- The New York Civil List compiled by Franklin Benjamin Hough (pages 42, 140, 196, 272 and 403; Weed, Parsons and Co., 1858)

U.S. House of Representatives
| Preceded by Luther Badger | Member of the U.S. House of Representatives from New York's 23rd congressional district 1827–1831 | Succeeded by Freeborn G. Jewett |
