= Barnabas Eldredge =

Barnabas Eldredge may refer to:

- Barnabas Eldredge (businessman)
- Barnabas Eldredge (assemblyman)
