= Roger Skinner =

American judge

Judge of the United States District Court for the Northern District of New York
- In office November 24, 1819 – August 19, 1825
- Appointed by: James Monroe
- Preceded by: Matthias B. Tallmadge
- Succeeded by: Alfred Conkling

United States Attorney for the Northern District of New York
- In office March 21, 1815 – November 23, 1819
- Appointed by: James Madison
- Preceded by: Office established
- Succeeded by: Jacob Sutherland

Member of the New York State Senate from the Eastern District
- In office January 1, 1818 – December 31, 1821 Serving with Various (multi-member district)
- Preceded by: James Cochran, Perley Keyes, Samuel Stewart, John J. Prendergast, George Tibbits, David Allen, Henry J. Frey, Ralph Hascall
- Succeeded by: Levi Adams, George Rosecrantz, Thomas Frothingham, Duncan McMartin Jr., Benjamin Mooers, David C. Judson, Daniel Shipherd, John L. Viele

Member of the New York State Assembly from Washington County
- In office January 1, 1808 – December 31, 1809 Serving with Alexander Livingston (1808-1809), Reuben Whallon (1808), Kitchel Bishop (1809-1809), James Hill (1808), John Gale (1809), Jason Kellogg (1809)
- Preceded by: Kitchel Bishop, Thomas Cornell, Lyman Hall, James Hill, Henry Mattison, Gideon Taft
- Succeeded by: John Baker, John Richards, Isaac Sargent, Reuben Whallon, David Woods

Personal details
- Born: Roger Skinner; June 1, 1773 Litchfield, Connecticut Colony, British America
- Died: August 19, 1825 (aged 52) Albany, New York, US
- Resting place: Albany Rural Cemetery; Menands, New York, US
- Party: Democratic-Republican
- Relatives: Richard Skinner (brother); Mark Skinner (nephew)
- Profession: Attorney

Roger Skinner (June 1, 1773 – August 19, 1825) was an attorney and government official from New York. He was most notable for his service as United States district judge for the Northern District of New York from 1819 to 1825.

A native of Litchfield, Connecticut, Skinner was educated in Litchfield and trained for a career in the law by studying in the office of a local attorney. In addition to practicing law, Skinner began a career in government and politics when he served as clerk of the Litchfield County Probate Court from 1796 to 1806. He subsequently moved to Albany, New York, where he practiced law and became active in politics as a Democratic-Republican. He was a member of the New York State Assembly from 1808 to 1809.

Skinner later moved to Sandy Hill, where he practiced law and served as a justice of the peace and district attorney. From 1815 to 1819, he served as United States Attorney for the Northern District of New York. From 1819 to 1821, he was a member of the New York State Senate. From 1819 to 1825, Skinner served as judge of the Northern District of New York.

A lifelong bachelor, as a judge Skinner shared an Albany home with attorney and politician Martin Van Buren, who was a widower. Skinner's health declined in 1825, and Van Buren nursed him during his final illness. He died in Albany on August 19, 1825. Skinner was initially buried at State Street Cemetery in Albany. He was reinterred in Van Buren's family plot at Albany Rural Cemetery in 1857.

== Early life ==
Skinner was born in Litchfield, Connecticut Colony, British America on June 1, 1773, a son of Timothy Skinner and Susanna Marsh Skinner. He was educated in Litchfield, studied law, was admitted to the bar, and entered private practice in Connecticut.

== Start of career ==
While practicing in Connecticut, Skinner served as clerk of the Litchfield County Probate Court from 1796 to 1806.

He continued private practice in Albany, New York. Among the students who learned the law from him after his move to New York were Silas Wright and Judge Esek Cowen of Saratoga Springs. He was a member of the New York State Assembly from 1808 to 1811.

As a resident of Sandy Hill, he was appointed a justice of the peace in 1808. He was district attorney for the Fourth Judicial District of New York from 1811 to 1812. Skinner was appointed United States Attorney for the Northern District of New York in 1815 and served until 1819. He was a member of the New York State Senate from 1818 to 1821. In 1821, Skinner served on the state Council of Appointment.

== Federal judicial service ==
Skinner received a recess appointment from President James Monroe on November 24, 1819, to the seat on the United States District Court for the Northern District of New York vacated by the resignation of Judge Matthias B. Tallmadge. He was nominated to the same position by President Monroe on January 3, 1820. He was confirmed by the United States Senate on January 5, 1820, and received his commission the same day. Upon ascending the bench, Skinner sold his law office to Benjamin Franklin Butler, who took over his clients and his pending business. His service terminated on August 19, 1825, due to his death in Albany.

== Family ==
Skinner was the son of Timothy Skinner and Susannah Marsh Skinner. His brother Richard Skinner served as Governor of Vermont. His nephew Mark Skinner was a prominent Chicago, Illinois attorney who served as United States Attorney for the Northern District of Illinois.

== Friendship with Martin Van Buren ==
As a judge, Skinner resided in Albany. He was a lifelong bachelor, and fellow politician Martin Van Buren was a widower, so Skinner and Van Buren shared a house. Van Buren and Skinner were Democratic-Republicans; when Van Buren created the Albany Regency clique to lead New York's Bucktails (the anti-DeWitt Clinton faction that eventually became New York's Democratic Party), Skinner was counted among its members.

In an often-recounted incident of political miscalculation, when Clinton's political career seemed at an ebb in 1824, Skinner engineered his removal from the Erie Canal Commission. Clinton had long been identified among the public as the canal's biggest proponent; voter outrage at his removal led to his return to the governorship in the 1824 election. The maneuver against Clinton had been executed without Van Buren's knowledge; initially, Skinner and the Bucktails believed they had brought about Clinton's political death. Later, Van Buren is said to have remarked to Skinner that in politics it is possible to kill someone "too dead".

== Death and burial ==
Van Buren nursed Skinner during his final illness, and was with him when he died in Albany on August 19, 1825. Skinner was buried at State Street Cemetery in Albany. In 1857, he was reinterred in Martin Van Buren's family plot at Albany Rural Cemetery, Section 62, Lot 34. He died without a will, and Butler was appointed to administer his estate.

== Sources ==
=== Books ===
- Anderson, George Baker (1899). Our County and Its People: A Descriptive and Biographical Record of Saratoga County, New York. Boston, MA: Boston History Company. p. 517.
- Cole, Donald B. (1984). Martin Van Buren and the American Political System. Princeton University Press: Princeton, NJ. ISBN 9781400853618.
- Jenkins, John Stilwell (1847). The Life of Silas Wright: Late Governor of the State of New York. Auburn, NY: Alden & Markham. p. 18.
- Johnson, Crisfield (1878). History of Washington Co., New York. Everts & Ensign: Philadelphia, PA. p. 118.
- Kilbourne, Payne Kenyon (1859). Sketches and Chronicles of the Town of Litchfield, Connecticut. Hartford, CT: Case, Lockwood and Company. p. 211.
- Klein, Milton M. (2001). The Empire State: A History of New York. Ithaca, NY: Cornell University Press. ISBN 0801489911.
- Marsh, Dwight Whitney (1895). Marsh Genealogy: Giving Several Thousand Descendants of John Marsh of Hartford, Ct. 1636-1895. Amherst, MA: Carpenter & Morehouse.
- Van Buren, Martin; Mackenzie, William Lyon (1846). The Life and Times of Martin Van Buren: The Correspondence of His Friends, Family and Pupils. Boston, MA: Cooke & Co. p. 197.
- History of Litchfield County, Connecticut. Philadelphia, PA: J. W. Lewis & Co. 1881. p. 148.

=== Internet ===
- "Albany Rural Cemetery Burial Cards, 1791-2011, entry for Roger Skinner". Ancestry.com. Provo, UT: Ancestry.com, LLC.
- "New York Wills and Probate Records, 1659-1999, entry for Roger Skinner". Ancestry.com. Provo, UT: Ancestry.com, LLC. January 14, 1826.

=== Newspapers ===
- "Appointments by the President: Roger Skinner". Washington Gazette. Washington, DC. November 29, 1819.
- "Appointments by the President, by and with the Advice and Consent of the Senate: Roger Skinner". National Advocate. New York, NY. January 19, 1820.
- "The President has appointed the Hon. Alfred Conkling...". Connecticut Mirror. Hartford, CT. September 8, 1825.

== External sources ==
- Roger Skinner at Political Graveyard
- Roger Skinner at Open Jurist

Legal offices
Preceded by Matthias B. Tallmadge	Judge of the United States District Court for the Northern District of New York; 1819–1825	Succeeded by Alfred Conkling
