= John F. D. Vedder =

American politician

John Frederick Duane Vedder (May 31, 1789 Rotterdam, Schenectady County, New York - August 21, 1863) was an American politician from New York.

== Life ==
He was the son of Frederick Vedder and Maria (Van Petten) Vedder. On December 11, 1821, he married Hester Vedder (1799–1825), and their son was Frederick Vedder (b. 1823). In 1827, he married Nancy (Vedder) Newkirk (1789–1871), widow of John W. Newkirk and sister of his first wife.

He was a member of the New York State Assembly (Schenectady Co.) in 1822.

== Sources ==
- The Vedder Family in America, 1657-1985 by E. H. Vedder (1987, pg. 76)
- The New York Civil List compiled by Franklin Benjamin Hough (page 199; Weed, Parsons and Co., 1858)
