= Elisha Beebe Strong =

American lawyer and politician

Elisha Beebe Strong (Nov. 29, 1788 – Oct. 14, 1867) was an American lawyer and politician.

Strong, son of Elisha and Mary Strong, was born in Windsor, Connecticut, on November 29, 1788. He graduated from Yale College in 1809. He studied law at the Litchfield Law School, and subsequently in Canandaigua, New York, where he was admitted to the bar in 1812, and commenced practice in partnership with Win. H. Adams, Esq. In 1816, he purchased, jointly with Elisha Beach, Esq., one thousand acres of land in the vicinity of Rochester, New York, and removed to that place. From 1819 to 1820, he was a member of the New York State Legislature from Ontario County, and after the organization of Monroe County and in 1821, he was appointed first Judge of the County Court. His sons having settled in the West, Judge Strong moved to Detroit in 1851, and there spent the rest of his life. He married Dolly G., daughter of Nathaniel and Mary (Chaffee) Hooker of Windsor on June 24, 1813. Shortly after his removal to Detroit, he married Ellen O'Keefe, who survived him. He died in Detroit, Michigan after a brief illness on October 14, 1867, aged 79.

He is buried in Mount Hope Cemetery in Rochester, NY.

This article incorporates public domain material from the Yale Obituary Record.
