= Duncan McMartin Jr. =

American politician (1776–1837)

Duncan McMartin Jr. (1776 – October 3, 1837) was an American politician from New York.

== Life ==
He lived in Broadalbin, then in Montgomery Co., now in Fulton County. He married Margaret (1778–1835), and they had several children.

He was a member of the New York State Assembly (Hamilton & Montgomery Co.) in 1819.

He was a member of the New York State Senate (Eastern D.) from 1820 to 1822, sitting in the 43rd, 44th and 45th New York State Legislatures.

He was again a member of the State Senate (4th D.) from 1827 to 1830, sitting in the 50th, 51st, 52nd and 53rd New York State Legislatures.

He was buried at a cemetery now located in Perth, a town formed after McMartin's death, and which includes an area formerly belonging to Broadalbin.

== Sources ==
- The New York Civil List compiled by Franklin Benjamin Hough (pages 124, 127f, 143, 194 and 290; Weed, Parsons and Co., 1858)

New York State Senate
Preceded by Archibald McIntyre	New York State Senate; Fourth District (Class 4); 1827–1830	Succeeded by William I. Dodge
