= Barnabas Eldredge (assemblyman) =

American politician

Barnabas Eldredge (1768 - 1843) was an American politician from New York.

== Life ==
He was born on September 29, 1768, at New Bedford, Massachusetts, and was the son of Edward Eldredge, a Sergeant in the American Revolutionary War, and Adne Hammond. He was first married to Theodosia Wadsworth, daughter of Josiah Wadsworth. After her death in 1831, he remarried to Sarah Peck in June 1832. He died at Sharon, New York on September 5, 1843.

Eldredge was a Democratic-Republican/Bucktail member of the 44th New York State Legislature. He served in the New York State Assembly from 1820 to 1821, representing Schoharie County. Two of his sons also represented Schoharie County in the Assembly: Robert Eldredge in 1831, and Seth Eldredge in 1844.
