= Gamaliel H. Barstow =

American politician (1784–1865)

Gamaliel Henry Barstow
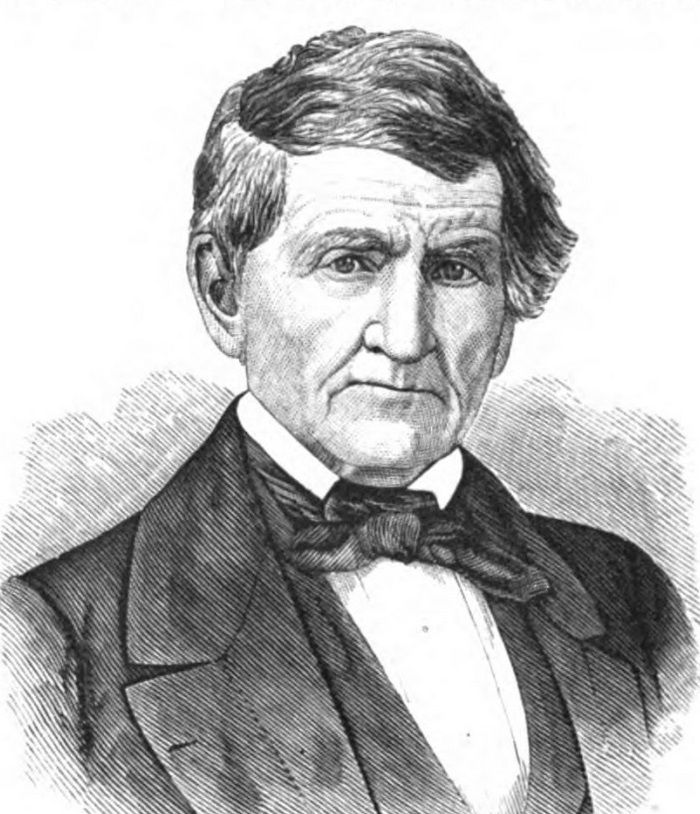

Member of the U.S. House of Representatives from New York's 25th district
- In office March 4, 1831 – March 3, 1833
- Preceded by: Thomas Maxwell
- Succeeded by: Samuel Clark

New York State Treasurer
- In office 1825–1828
- Governor: Dewitt Clinton
- Preceded by: Abraham Keyser, Jr.
- Succeeded by: Abraham Keyser, Jr.

Member of the New York State Assembly from the Tioga County district
- In office 1823–1826

New York State Senate western district
- In office 1819–1822

Member of the New York State Assembly from the Tioga County district
- In office January 1, 1816 – December 31, 1818
- Preceded by: Caleb Baker
- Succeeded by: Henry Wells

Personal details
- Born: July 20, 1784 Sharon, Litchfield County, Connecticut
- Died: March 30, 1865 (aged 80) Nichols, Tioga County, New York
- Citizenship: United States
- Party: Democratic–Republican; Anti-Mason; Whig
- Spouse: Nancy Coryell Barstow
- Children: Elijah Barstow; Mary Barstow; John Barstow
- Profession: physician judge politician

Gamaliel Henry Barstow (July 20, 1784 – March 30, 1865) was an American medical doctor, politician, and judge who served as a U.S. representative for New York.

== Biography ==
Barstow was born in Sharon, Litchfield County, Connecticut. He married Nancy Coryell and they had three children, Elijah, Mary, and John. He studied medicine in Great Barrington, Massachusetts

== Career ==
In 1812, Barstow moved to Tioga County, and there worked at his father's farm and taught school. Within a year he had become good friends with Judge Coryell (a powerful and influential figure in local politics) and by 1813 had married Coryell' daughter Nancy. He then built the first frame house in the town of Nichols, and opened a store at this location.

Barstow was a member of the New York State Assembly for Tioga County in 1816, 1816–17 and 1818. He was First Judge of the Tioga County Court from 1818 to 1823, and at the same time a member of the New York State Senate (Western D.) from 1819 to 1822, sitting in the 42nd, 43rd, 44th and 45th New York State Legislatures. By 1823, he was ready for a bigger house so he bought a parcel of land and built a two-story brick New England style home which now, 175 years later, houses The Barstow House Restaurant. He was again a member of the State Assembly in 1824 and 1827. He was New York State Treasurer from 1825 to 1826. In 1830, he was Town Supervisor of the Town of Nichols.

Elected as an Anti-Mason to the 22nd United States Congress, Barstow was U.S. Representative for the twenty-fifth district of New York from March 4, 1831, to March 3, 1833.

In 1836, he was the Whig candidate for Lieutenant Governor of New York on the ticket with Jesse Buel, but they were defeated by the incumbent Governor Marcy and Lt. Gov. John Tracy. Barstow was again State Treasurer from 1838 to 1839. Afterward, he continued the practice of medicine and engaged in agricultural pursuits in Nichols, New York, where he died on March 30, 1865, aged 80. He was buried at the Ashbury Cemetery there.

New York State Assembly
Preceded by Caleb Baker	New York State Assembly; Tioga County; 1816–1818	Succeeded by Henry Wells
Political offices
Preceded by Abraham Keyser, Jr.	New York State Treasurer; 1825–1826	Succeeded by Abraham Keyser, Jr.
U.S. House of Representatives
Preceded by Thomas Maxwell	Member of the U.S. House of Representatives from New York's 25th congressional district 1831–1833	Succeeded by Samuel Clark
Political offices
Preceded by Abraham Keyser, Jr.	New York State Treasurer; 1838–1839	Succeeded by Jacob Haight
