= Perry G. Childs =

American politician

Perry Green Childs (August 2, 1779 – March 27, 1835) was an American lawyer and politician.

== Life ==
Childs was born on August 2, 1779, in Pittsfield, Massachusetts, the son of Timothy Childs, a medical doctor and member of the Massachusetts House and Senate, and Rachel Wells Easton. His younger brothers were Henry H. Childs and Timothy Childs.

Childs graduated from Williams College in 1800. After graduating, he began studying law. He was admitted to the bar in 1804. He then became a large land owner and one of the earliest settlers of Cazenovia, New York. He worked as a trial lawyer there for the rest of his life, being one of the most active trial lawyers when Madison County was established and was part of the law firm Childs & Stebbins. He was appointed Master in Chancery in 1806. When the village of Cazenovia was incorporated in 1810, he was one of the first trustees of the village. He was also president of the Madison County Bank.

In 1818, he was elected to the New York State Senate, representing the Western District. He served in the Senate in 1819, 1820, 1821, and 1822. In 1822, he was elected to the Council of Appointment.

In 1807, Childs married Catharine Ledyard. Their children were Catharine Rachel (wife of Augustus W. Smith), Helen (mother of Charles S. Fairchild), Henry, Sophia Ledyard, Perry G. Jr., Jane S., and J.D. Ledyard.

Childs died in Cazenovia on March 27, 1835. He was buried in Evergreen Cemetery in Cazenovia.
