= Abraham Keyser Jr. =

American politician

Abraham Keyser (April 20, 1784, in Schoharie, then Albany County, New York – 1873 in Albany, Albany County, New York) was an American politician.

== Life ==
He was the son of Abraham Keyser (b. ca. 1762) and Maria Margaretha Schaffer (b. 1762), born in the part of the then district of Schoharie in Albany County which was after the creation of Schoharie County in 1797 part of the Town of Middleburgh, and was in 1828 separated as the Town of Fulton.

In 1800, he married Catharina Bauch, and they had nine children, among them Peter Keyser (1800–1881) who was over thirty years deputy State treasurer and chief accountant and transfer clerk in the Comptroller's office.

He was Sheriff of Schoharie County from 1815 to 1819. During his tenure occurred the murder of deputy sheriff Huddleston by John Van Alstine who was executed in 1819. Keyser appeared as a witness at the trial before Justice Ambrose Spencer.

He was a member from Schoharie County of the New York State Assembly from 1820 to 1822. He was New York State Treasurer from 1824 to 1825, and from 1826 to 1838.

== Sources ==
- Keyser genealogy, at fortklock.com
- Political Graveyard
- History of Schoharie County by William E. Roscoe (Chapter VI), at rootsweb
- History of Schoharie County by Jeptha R. Simms (1845; Chapter XX), at rootsweb
- The Van Alstine murder trial, at USgenweb
- The New York Civil List compiled by Franklin Benjamin Hough (pages 35, 285 and 407; Weed, Parsons and Co., 1858) (Google Books)
- Keyser genealogy, at threerivershms.com

Political offices
Preceded by Benjamin Knower	New York State Treasurer; 1824–1825	Succeeded by Gamaliel H. Barstow
Preceded by Gamaliel H. Barstow	New York State Treasurer; 1826–1838	Succeeded by Gamaliel H. Barstow
