= John T. More =

American politician (1771–1857)

John Taylor More (February 27, 1771 – June 23, 1857) was a Scottish-born American politician who served in several political capacities in the State of New York and Township of Roxbury.

== Early life ==
John Taylor More was born on February 27, 1771, in Rothiemurchus, Scotland, to John and Betty Taylor More.

In late 1772, he emigrated to the Thirteen Colonies with his parents and his brother Robert. After arriving in New York City, they traveled north and settled near what is now Hobart, New York, living in a small cabin.

After being displaced to Catskill from 1776 to 1784 due to Indigenous raids during the American Revolution, the family resettled in the town of Roxbury. A settlement was formed around them and named Moresville in the family's honor.

== Career ==
In 1807, More was elected as a member of the New York State Assembly. He was reelected three times; in 1808, 1810 and 1814. After that, More served as a state senator from 1819 to 1821.

Locally, he had served as Roxbury's first town clerk, holding that position until 1809. He was elected to the position of Town Supervisor in 1826, 1827, and in 1830. He was Moresville's postmaster for twenty years, taking the role after the death of his father, the previous postmaster.

== Personal life and death ==
He married Eleanor Laraway on December 16, 1792, and had a total of twelve children, two of which died while in infancy. His wife preceded him in death in 1832.

More held two slaves; a woman named Nan and her daughter Dorcas. He freed Nan, and afterward she worked as a paid cook for him before moving to Catskill. When she grew older she returned and More let her live in a house on his property.

He raised his family in Moresville, where he operated a hotel and farm. He was an elder in the village's Dutch Reformed Church. More relinquished management of his hotel to his son John L. More, and died on June 23, 1857, aged 86, in Grand Gorge, New York.

In 1890, descendants of More's parents, John and Betty Taylor More, formed the John More Association. The association organized members into groups based on which of John and Betty's children they descended from, and one line honors John T.
