= Cornelius Heeney =

American politician

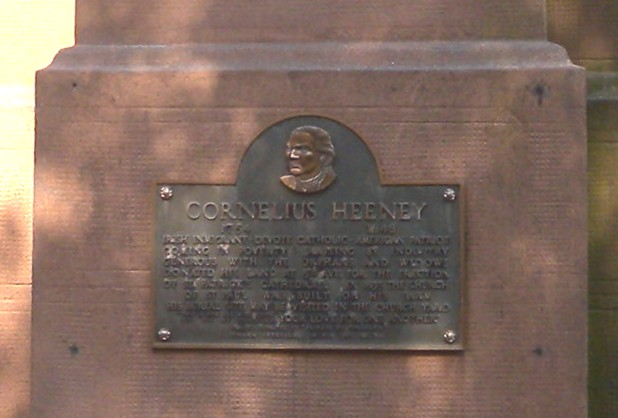
Plaque on Old Saint Paul's Catholic Church, Brooklyn

Cornelius Heeney (1754, in King's County, Ireland – May 3, 1848) was an American merchant, politician, and philanthropist. A one-time partner of John Jacob Astor, Heeney served in the New York State Assembly from 1818 to 1822. He established the Brooklyn Benevolent Society which continues to grant scholarships to students attending a number of colleges and universities in the New York area.

== Life ==
Heeney was born in King's Co. (Offaly) in Ireland 1754. He spent some time with a relative in Dublin learning the mercantile trade. He emigrated from Ireland to Philadelphia at the age of 30.

On the voyage his ship was struck by lightning when entering the Delaware River. Oystermen, acting as rescuers, charged a dollar for each passenger put ashore. A quaker gave Heeney the money, saying: ‘Whenever thou seest a fellow creature in want of a dollar as thou art now, give it to him, and thou wilt have repaid me’.

This made a great impression on Heeney, who later attributed his interest in philanthropy to this encounter.

A few months later, Heeney went to New York and found work with a Quaker merchant in lower Manhattan, William Backhaus. There he met John Jacob Astor. When Backhaus retired in 1797, he left his business to Heeney and Astor. The two remained in business together for a short time, but Heeney eventually opened his own fur trading establishment on Water Street. A shrewd and careful merchant, he soon became quite wealthy. He became a naturalized citizen in 1807. Heeney is described as 5"9' clean-shaven with an aquiline nose. "His hair, when long, was confined behind his neck by a slight ribbon and fell over his coat collar, and to a stranger he would pass as an orthodox quaker, even to the broad brimmed hat and the William Penn knee breeches". Heeney was playful in private, an enjoyed entertaining many guests.

Heeney remained a bachelor his entire life, and donated much of his money to Catholic charitable causes throughout New York City. He was instrumental in the founding of the first Catholic Church in New York, St. Peter's, and served as one of the early trustees of the parish. He contributed money for the construction of St. Patrick's Old Cathedral, and gave both money and land for the Roman Catholic Orphan Asylum. He helped establish a Catholic printing press and the first Catholic newspaper, the Truth Teller. Heeney also served as guardian to the future cardinal of New York, John McCloskey, after the death of young McCloskey's father.

In 1806 Heeney presented a petition to the New York state assembly, demanding that an anti-Catholic oath of office be stricken from the books. He was a member of the New York State Assembly from 1818 to 1822, and was the second Catholic to hold elected office in New York State following his good friend Andrew Morris.

== Brooklyn Benevolent Society ==
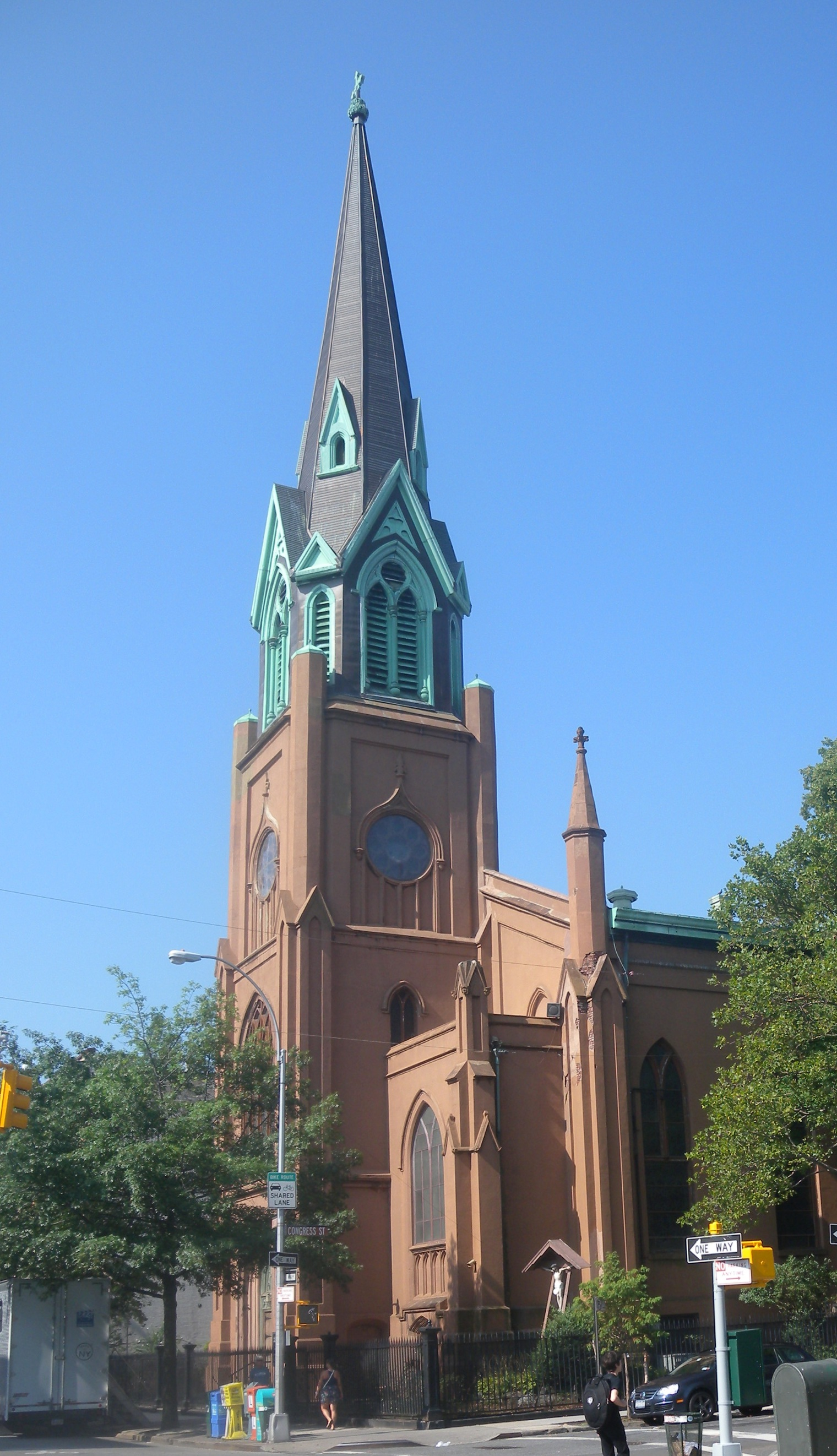
Old St. Paul RCC Court & Congress

After the Great Fire of New York of 1835 Heeney went to live in Brooklyn, where he had purchased a large farm at Amity and Congress streets that extended from Court street to the river. He built his house near the corner of Henry and Amity Streets. Heeney retired from business in 1837 but continued his charitable benefactions, and having spent the most of his income for so long in good works, he planned to secure the disposition of the whole of his estate for the same purpose. Accordingly it was incorporated by Act of Legislature, 10 May, 1845, as "The Trustees and Associates of the Brooklyn Benevolent Society" with the object of administering the estate for the benefit of the poor and orphans.

The Society provided fuel in winter to the poor, clothing for poor schoolchildren, and paid the salaries of teachers of those children. In 1868 two relatives of Heeney unsuccessfully sued the Society over title to the real estate it administered.

The second Catholic church in Brooklyn, St. Paul's dedicated 21 January, 1838, was built on land given by Heeney. Heeney was buried in a vault he had reserved for himself in the back garden of St. Paul's Church, corner of Court and Congress streets.

== Legacy ==
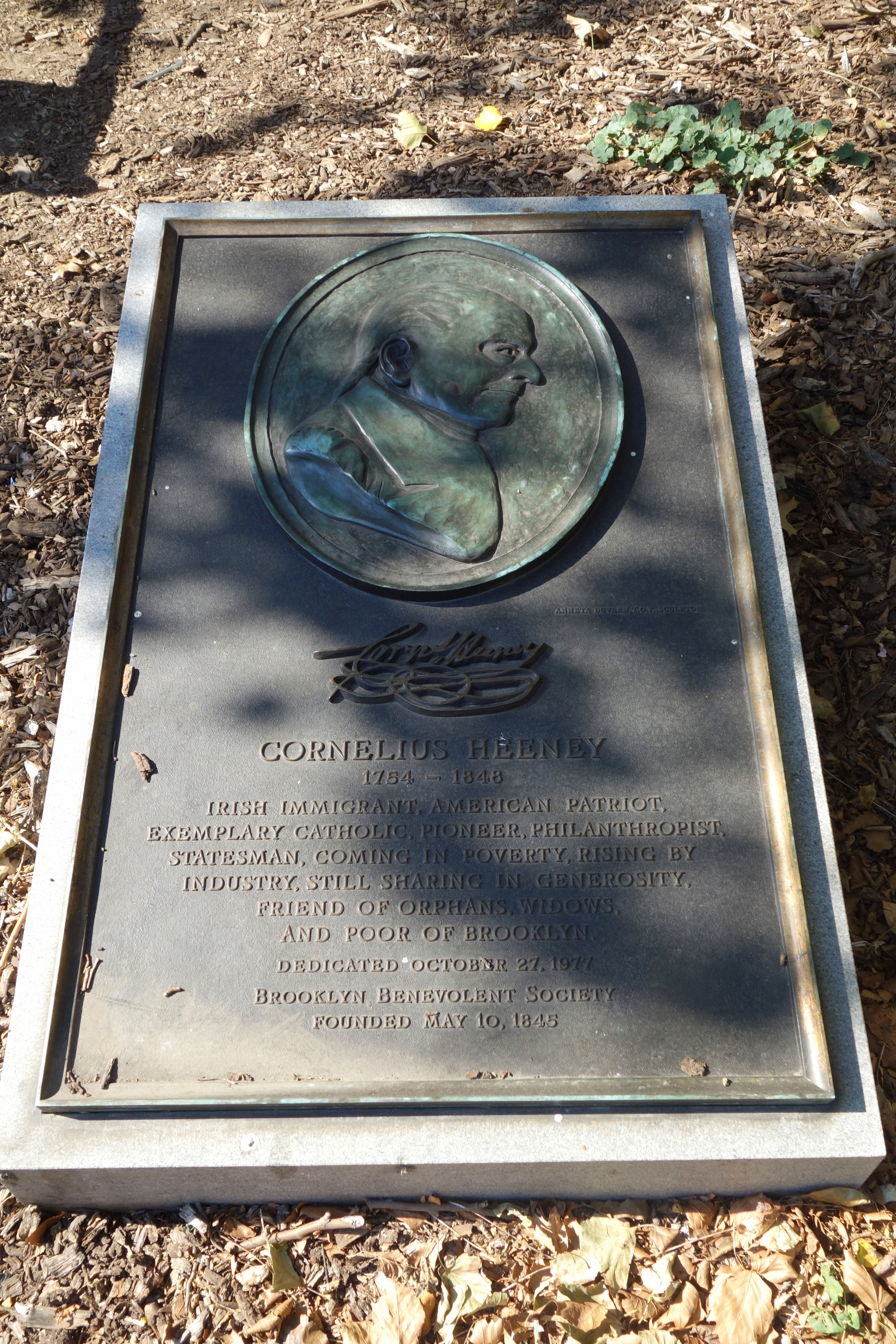
Cornelius Heeney Memorial - Brooklyn, NY

There is a Cornelius Heeney Memorial plaque in front of New York State Supreme Court building, at Montague and Court Streets in Brooklyn.

As the Brooklyn Benevolent Society later increased its focus on education, it established scholarships in memory of Cornelius Heeney at a number of schools in the New York City area:

Seton Hall University awards the Cornelius Heeney Memorial Scholarship to New York City high school students (preference given to Brooklyn residents). St. Francis College in Brooklyn awards a scholarship in memory of Cornelius Heeney. The Cornelius Heeney Memorial Scholarship is available to students at Saint Peter's University. Preference is given to students from Brooklyn or New York City. Marymount Manhattan College offers the Cornelius Heeney Endowed Scholarship for students from NYC boroughs (with a preference for students from Brooklyn) who demonstrate academic merit and financial need. The Cornelius Heeney Memorial Scholarship at Manhattan College provides tuition assistance to an entering freshman who is a resident of Brooklyn, New York and who demonstrates financial need. Fairfield University also offers a Cornelius A. Heeney Scholarship.

== See also ==
- Nicholas Devereux - upstate philanthropist
