= Benjamin Mooers =

American politician

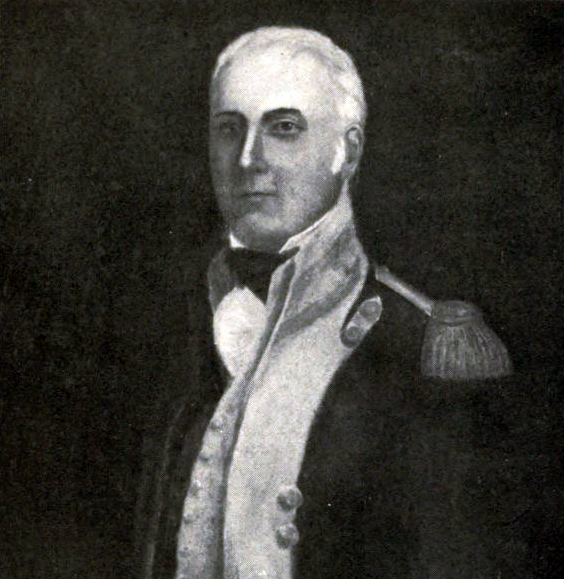
- Major General Benjamin Mooers
- Born: April 1, 1758; Haverhill, Massachusetts
- Died: February 20, 1838 (aged 79); Plattsburgh, New York
- Spouses: Hannah (Platt) Mooers (1791-1809); Elizabeth (Addoms) Mooers (1809-1818); Mary (Bailey) Mooers (1818-???)
- Relatives: Abigail Hazen Mooers (mother); Brigadier General Moses Hazen (Uncle)
- Military career
- Allegiance: United States
- Branch: United States Militia
- Rank: Major General
- Unit: 2nd Canadian Regiment
- Other work: County treasurer

Benjamin Mooers (April 1, 1758 – February 20, 1838) was a military veteran of both the Revolutionary War and the War of 1812, and a politician, serving in the New York State Legislature. He also served as the sheriff of Clinton County, New York in between the wars.

== Early life ==
Benjamin Mooers was born in Haverhill, Massachusetts to Abigail and Benjamin Mooers on April 1, 1758. In 1773, Mooers started an apprenticeship under John White, a merchant and importer in Haverhill. He worked with White until the Revolutionary War began, when Mooers enlisted as a volunteer in the Continental Army.

== Later life ==
In 1783, he settled in the vicinity of Plattsburgh, New York, a frontier settlement at the time. Mooers was the sheriff of Clinton County and a presidential elector in 1808.

During the War of 1812, Mooers returned to military service. He was commissioned as a general in the New York Militia, commanding troops at the Battle of Plattsburgh, on September 11, 1814. After the war, he was elected and served as a member of the New York legislature. Mooers died on February 20, 1838, and was buried at Riverside Cemetery.

== Occupations ==
=== "Chief Purchaser" ===
In addition to his high-status among military operations, Benjamin Mooers was a landowner in the areas surrounding the Champlain Valley. To the extent that he became known as the Chief Purchaser in the late 1780s. According to accounts of refugees who met with Mooers, he owned large masses of land for which he paid little. A large amount of the land owned by Mooers was part of the Canadian and Nova Scotia Refugee Tract.

=== Lieutenant ===
Mooers served as a lieutenant in the New York militia and the 2nd Canadian Regiment under his maternal uncle, Moses Hazen, during the American Revolutionary War.

=== Power of attorney ===
Based on his status in the Champlain Valley, Mooers was given powers of attorney by many Canadian refugees. These powers were delegated to him due to his ownership of nearly 40% of the refugee tract.

=== War general ===
Benjamin Mooers served as a major general in the War of 1812. During this time, he directed troops to defend the United States against Britain.

=== Presidential elector ===
He served on the board of individuals who were designed to elect the president during the election of 1808.
