= Michael Ulshoeffer =

American politician

Member of the New York State Assembly from New York County
- In office July 1, 1817 – December 31, 1822

Personal details
- Born: March 30, 1793 New York City, U.S.
- Died: September 6, 1881 (aged 88) New York City, U.S.
- Party: Democratic-Republican / Bucktails
- Spouse: Mary Ann Gracie (m. 1823; died 1876)
- Parent(s): Margareth Miller; George Ulshoeffer

Michael Ulshoeffer (March 30, 1793 – September 6, 1881) was a New York City lawyer, politician and judge.

== Early life ==
Ulshoeffer was born in New York City March 30, 1793. He was the son of Margareth Miller and George Ulshoeffer (1748–1836), a Hessian who was born in Creglingen, Germany, and who was forced into the British service and sent to America in 1777. After the war ended, his father came to New York where he was a music teacher until his death in 1836.

Ulshoeffer studied law in the office of T.W. Smith at 3 Cedar Street and later became Smith's partner.

== Career ==
In 1813, he was admitted as an attorney in the Court of Common Pleas and in the Supreme Court of New York. In 1815, he was appointed a Master in Chancery, serving from 1815 to 1825 as Notary of the City Bank. In 1816, he was admitted as a counsellor at law in the Mayor's Court.

Beginning in 1817, he was elected as a Democratic-Republican / Bucktails member of the New York State Assembly, being the champion of a bill to revise the state constitution, writing a reply to Chancellor Kent's opinion disapproving the measure. He first sat in the 41st New York State Legislature and was reelected every year serving until December 31, 1822. He became corporation attorney, and later corporation counsel, occupying the latter office for four years.

In 1834, Ulshoeffer was appointed judge of the court of common pleas by William L. Marcy, the Governor of New York, reappointed in 1843, and was elected a member of that bench in 1846 under the new constitution. At the expiration of his term Ulshoeffer did not resume practice, but was frequently selected as an arbitrator and referee.

In 1862, Ulshoeffer was appointed as one of the Commissioners of Estimate for the extension of Central Park in the vicinity of 106th and 110th Streets and Fifth and Eighth Avenues.

== Personal life ==
In 1823, Ulshoeffer was married to Mary Ann Gracie (1805–1876), daughter of the late William R. Gracie, Esq., who owned a large area of Brooklyn Heights and occupied one of the most imposing mansions on Washington Street when it was Brooklyn's most fashionable address. (Note: Other sources indicate that Mary Gracie was the daughter of Scottish born shipping magnate and merchant, Archibald Gracie (1755–1816). If so, that would make Charles King, James G. King, and William Beach Lawrence Ulshoeffer's brothers-in-law.) Together, they were the parents of:

- Nancy Gracie Ulshoeffer (1824–1884), who married Paris Irving (1816–1879), a nephew of Washington Irving, in 1848.
- Sarah M. Ulshoeffer (1831–1882).
- Mary Gracie Ulshoeffer (1836–1911), who married in William Bayard Hoffman (1817–1880), the son of Dr. William Hoffman, in 1865. He was previously married to Mary Lorillard Wolfe (1823–1847), the granddaughter of Pierre Lorillard II and sister of Catharine Lorillard Wolfe (1828–1887), the philanthropist.
- William Gracie Ulshoeffer (1837–1904), a Columbia University educated lawyer who did not marry.

He died in New York City on September 6, 1881, at the age of eighty-eight. He was buried at Woodlawn Cemetery in the Bronx.

=== Descendants ===
Through his daughter Nancy, he was the grandfather of Francis Ulshoeffer Paris (b. 1864). Through his daughter Mary, he was the grandfather of Dorothea Wolfe Hoffman (1866–1907) and Mary Ulshoeffer Hoffman (1868–1951), who were both painted by Fredrika Weidner in 1898.
