= Samuel B. Romaine =

American politician

Samuel B. Romaine was an American lawyer and politician.

== Life ==
He was the son of Colonel Benjamin Romaine (1764–1844, several times Grand Sachem of the Tammany Society).

Samuel Romaine was a member of the New York State Assembly in 1816–17 and from 1819 to 1822, and was Speaker in 1822.

His son Benjamin Romaine, Jr. was a well-known Whig politician in the 1850s in New York's 15th Ward.

== Sources ==
- NYT on May 15, 1866
- Speaker election result

Political offices
Preceded by Peter Sharpe	Speaker of the New York State Assembly; 1822	Succeeded by Peter R. Livingston
