= Ephraim Hart (New York politician) =

American politician

Ephraim Hart (December 27, 1774 Farmington, Hartford County, Connecticut - February 14, 1839 St. Augustine, St. Johns County, Florida) was an American politician from New York.

== Life ==
He was the son of Thomas Hart (b. 1749), President of the Hamilton-Oneida Academy and assemblyman in 1806, and Mary (Hungerford) Hart (1751-1823).

In 1815, Ephraim Hart removed from Clinton to Utica.

He was a Democratic-Republican/Clintonian member of the New York State Senate from 1817 to 1822.

In 1818, he was appointed by Governor DeWitt Clinton to the Erie Canal Commission to fill the vacancy caused by the resignation of Joseph Ellicott. Though Clinton selected Hart based on his proven ability, he failed to take into account Hart's longstanding and vociferous opposition to the Federalist Party. As a result, the Bucktails in the New York State Legislature were able to win the support of enough Federalists to deny Hart confirmation to the board, electing instead Henry Seymour as his replacement and allowing the Bucktails to capture a key part of the governor's political power base.

State Senator Truman Hart (1784-1838) was his brother. Congressman Roswell Hart (1824-1883) was his nephew.

== Sources ==
- The New York Civil List compiled by Franklin Benjamin Hough (pages 40 and 377; Weed, Parsons and Co., 1858)
- Obit in Florida Herald and Southern Democrat, St. Augustine, February 14, 1839
- Thomas Hastings: An Introduction to His Life and Music by Hermine Weigel Williams (2005; page 17, note 14)
