= Levi Adams =

19th century American politician

Member of the Council of Appointment
- In office 1820–1821

Member of the New York Senate from the Lewis County district
- In office 1818–1822

Personal details
- Born: December 30, 1762 Simsbury, Connecticut Colony
- Died: June 18, 1831 (aged 68)
- Resting place: East Road Cemetery, Lowville, New York
- Spouse: Ruth Stevens1892 (m. 1831)
- Children: Levi Finch Adams^{(b. 1788; died 1855)}; Dillon Adams^{(b. 1797; died 1812)}; James Madison Adams^{(b. 1813; died 1864)}

Military service
- Allegiance: United States
- Branch/service: New York Militia
- Battles/wars: American Revolutionary War

Levi Adams (December 30, 1762 – June 18, 1831) was an American farmer and politician. He served in the New York Senate from 1818 through 1822, representing Lewis County, and was a member of New York's Council of Appointment in 1820. As a young man during the American Revolutionary War, he served in the New York militia.

His youngest son, James M. Adams, became a prominent physician and pioneer settler at Fond du Lac, Wisconsin. Two of his grandsons died in the service of the Union Army during the American Civil War.
