= David Ellicott Evans =

American politician

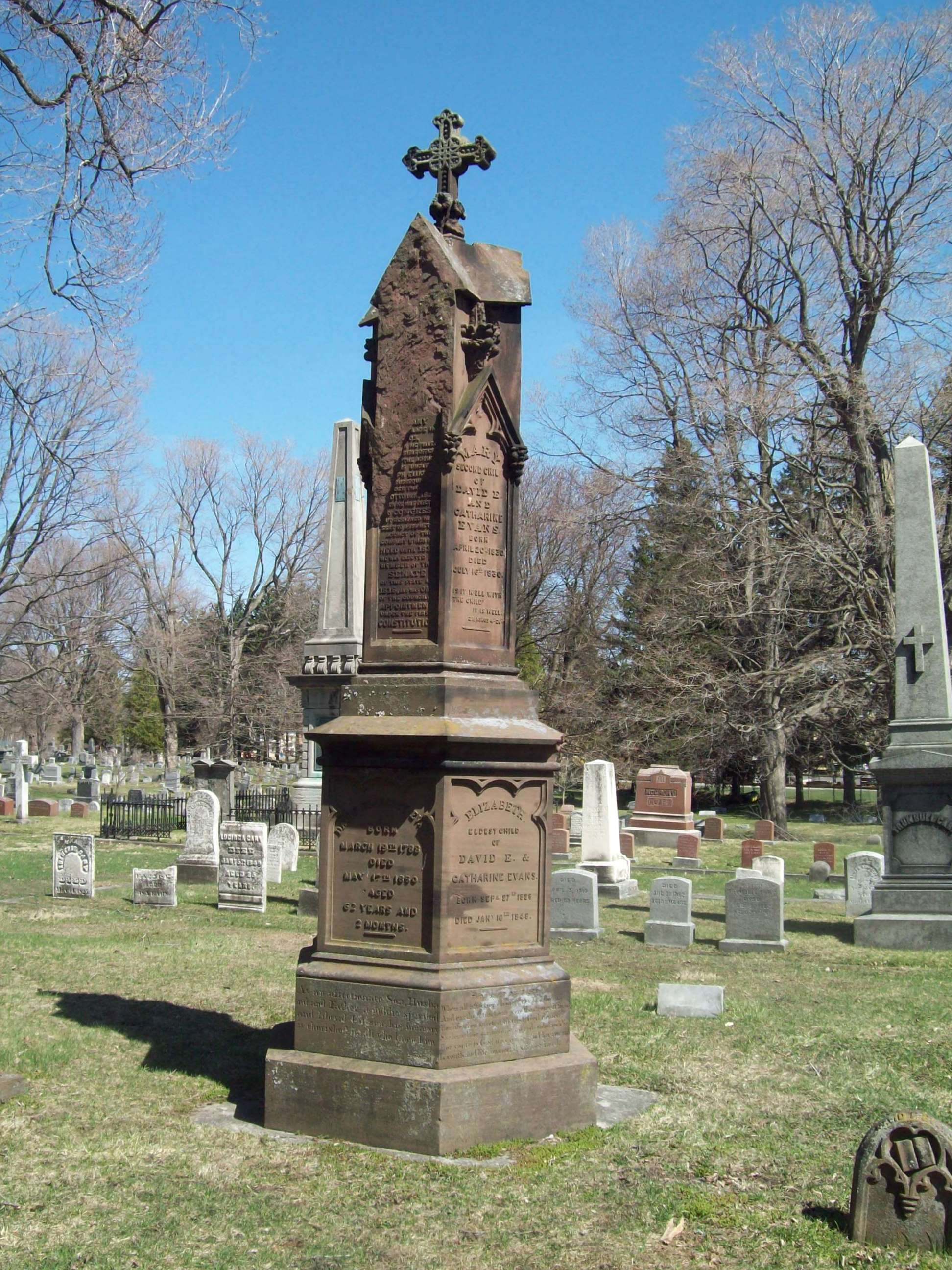
- Tombstone of David E. Evans at Batavia Cemetery in New York

Member of the U.S. House of Representatives from New York's 29th district
- In office March 4, 1827 – May 2, 1827
- Preceded by: Parmenio Adams
- Succeeded by: Vacant

Personal details
- Born: March 19, 1788 Ellicott City, Maryland, U.S.
- Died: May 17, 1850 (aged 62) Batavia, New York, U.S.

David Ellicott Evans (March 19, 1788 – May 17, 1850) briefly served as a United States representative from New York in 1827.

== Biography ==
Evans was born in Ellicotts Upper Mills, Maryland. His uncle was New York judge, land surveyor, and city planner Joseph Ellicott. Evans attended the common schools, moved to New York in 1803 and settled in Batavia. He was employed as a clerk and afterward as an accounting clerk with the Holland Land Company.

=== Political career ===
He served as a member of the New York State Senate, and was a member of the council of appointment.

Evans was elected as a Jacksonian candidate to the Twentieth Congress and served from March 4, 1827, until his resignation May 2, 1827, before the assembling of Congress.

=== Later career and death ===
He was appointed resident agent of the Holland Land Company in 1827 and served until his resignation in 1837. Evans also engaged in banking, was a delegate to the convention held at Albany in 1827 to advocate a protective tariff, and retired from active business pursuits in 1837 to devote his attention to his extensive land interests.

He died in Batavia and was interred in Batavia Cemetery.

U.S. House of Representatives
Preceded by Parmenio Adams	Member of the U.S. House of Representatives from New York's 29th congressional district March 4, 1827 – May 2, 1827	Succeeded by Phineas L. Tracy
