= Henry Seymour (New York politician) =

American politician (1780–1837)

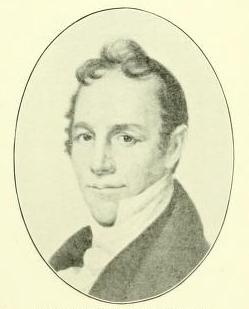

2nd Mayor of Utica
- In office 1833–1834
- Preceded by: Joseph Kirkland
- Succeeded by: Joseph Kirkland

Erie Canal Commissioner
- In office 1819–1831

Member of the New York Assembly for Onondaga
- In office 1819-1820

Member of the New York Senate from the Western district
- In office: 1821–1822; 1815–1819

Personal details
- Born: May 30, 1780 Litchfield, Connecticut
- Died: August 26, 1837 (aged 57) Utica, New York
- Occupation: Merchant; banker; politician

Henry Seymour (May 30, 1780 – August 26, 1837) was an American merchant, banker and politician from New York.

== Life ==
Born in Litchfield, Litchfield County, Connecticut, Seymour was the sixth child and fifth son of Major Moses Seymour (1742–1826), a politician who served as an officer in the American Revolution, and his wife Molly (Marsh) Seymour. His brother, Horatio became a successful businessman and banker, and went on to serve two terms in the United States Senate.

In 1801 Henry Seymour left Connecticut with $300 from his father. Settling in Onondaga County, New York, he used the money to establish a general store in Pompey Hill. Seymour prospered with the arrival of new immigrants from the New England region, and soon became a prominent member of the community. In January 1807 he married Mary Ledyard Forman (1785–1859), of Matawan, New Jersey, daughter of General Johnathan Forman and Mary (Ledyard) Forman. They had six children, two boys and four girls. Their son Horatio Seymour was twice Governor of New York and was the Democratic nominee for U.S. President in 1868, while their daughter Julia Catherine married U.S. Senator Roscoe Conkling.

=== Political career ===
Seymour began his political career in 1809 when he was selected as town clerk. He served in the War of 1812 as a quartermaster under the command of General Jacob Brown. In April 1815 he was elected to the New York State Senate, where he served until 1818. While in the Senate, he became an integral part of the Albany Regency organization then being created by Martin Van Buren, and was regarded as his most effective lieutenant. In 1818 he was selected by the legislature to a year-long term on the Council of Appointment, and afterward served for two terms in the New York State Assembly.

In March 1819 Seymour was elected by the Bucktails in the New York State Legislature to the Erie Canal Commission. He replaced Ephraim Hart, who had been a recess appointment made by Governor DeWitt Clinton after the resignation of Joseph Ellicott. Seymour's election was key to the Bucktails' capture of the canal commission, which was an integral part of the governor's power base. As a commissioner, Seymour addressed himself conscientiously to his job of ensuring the navigability of the canal, even moving his family in 1820 to Utica in Oneida County, New York in order to supervise the construction of the canal's middle section. He continued as a commissioner until 1831, after which he served as mayor of Utica in 1833 and as a member of a three-man commission tasked with arbitrating the boundary between New York and New Jersey.

=== Business career and death ===
Though mentioned as a possible candidate for governor, by the late 1820s Seymour focused his attention increasingly on his growing real estate and business interests. In 1835 he became the president of the Farmers' Loan and Trust Company and moved to New York City. Though his interests flourished during the boom years of the early 1830s, the New York fire of 1835 followed by the financial panic of 1837 brought an end to prosperous times and left Seymour in a state of acute depression. Returning to Utica in August 1837, he shot himself on August 26.

== Family ==
Seymour had a number of successful family members in addition to his brother and children. State Engineer Horatio Seymour Jr. was his grandson, Congressman Origen S. Seymour was his nephew, and Congressman Edward Woodruff Seymour was his great-nephew.
