= 35th New York State Legislature =

New York state legislative session

←	34th	36th	→
- The Old State Capitol (1879)

Overview
- Legislative body: New York State Legislature
- Jurisdiction: New York, United States
- Term: July 1, 1811 – June 30, 1812

Senate
- Members: 32
- President: Lt. Gov. DeWitt Clinton (Dem.-Rep.)
- Party control: Democratic-Republican (26–6)

Assembly
- Members: 112
- Speaker: Alexander Sheldon (Dem.-Rep.)
- Party control: Democratic-Republican (66–38)

Sessions
- 1st: January 28 – March 27, 1812
- 2nd: May 21 – June 19, 1812

The 35th New York State Legislature, consisting of the New York State Senate and the New York State Assembly, met from January 28 to June 19, 1812, during the fifth year of Daniel D. Tompkins's governorship, in Albany.

== Background ==
Under the provisions of the New York Constitution of 1777, amended by the Constitutional Convention of 1801, 32 Senators were elected on general tickets in the four senatorial districts for four-year terms. They were divided into four classes, and every year eight Senate seats came up for election. Assemblymen were elected countywide on general tickets to a one-year term, the whole Assembly being renewed annually.

In 1797, Albany was declared the State capital, and all subsequent Legislatures have been meeting there ever since. In 1799, the Legislature enacted that future Legislatures meet on the last Tuesday of January of each year unless called earlier by the governor.

In 1808, Cattaraugus and Chautauqua counties had been split from Genesee County, but no county governments were organized for some time. In 1811, both counties were joined with Niagara in one Assembly district with 1 seat.

Lt. Gov. John Broome died on August 8, 1810, and a special election was required to fill the vacancy. State Senator and Mayor of New York City DeWitt Clinton was nominated by the Democratic-Republican majority. Nicholas Fish was nominated by the Federalists, and Marinus Willet was nominated by the Tammany organization in New York City which, although being the local affiliate of the Democratic-Republican Party, was opposed to Clinton.

At this time the politicians were divided into two opposing political parties: the Federalists and the Democratic-Republicans.

== Elections ==
The State election was held from April 30 to May 2, 1811. DeWitt Clinton was elected Lieutenant Governor of New York.

Senator John Tayler (Eastern D.) was re-elected. Erastus Root, William Taber (both Middle D.), Elisha Arnold, Kitchel Bishop, Ruggles Hubbard (all three Eastern D.), Casper M. Rouse (Western D.), and Assemblyman Nathan Sanford (Southern D.) were also elected to the Senate. All eight were Democratic-Republicans.

== Sessions ==
The Legislature met at the Old State Capitol in Albany on January 28, 1812; was prorogued by the Governor on March 27; met again on May 21; and adjourned on June 19.

Alexander Sheldon (Dem.-Rep.) was again elected Speaker, without opposition.

On February 5, the Assembly passed a bill (vote 50 to 42) to re-appoint David Thomas (Dem.-Rep.) as New York State Treasurer in place of Abraham G. Lansing (Fed.). The Senate concurred on February 8 by a vote of 19 to 5.

The main political controversy during this session was the chartering of the Bank of America with a capital of $6,000,000. The bankers offered to pay a bonus of $600,000, to be divided as follows: $400,000 to the Common-School Fund, $100,000 to the Literature Fund and $100,00 to the State Treasury if during the next 20 years no other bank would be chartered. Besides, the bankers offered a loan of $1,000,000 to the State at 5% interest p.a. to be used for the Erie Canal construction; and a loan of $1,000,000 at 6% interest to the farmers who were losing money because of the Embargo. State Treasurer David Thomas and Solomon Southwick were the main lobbyists for the chartering; Gov. Daniel D. Tompkins, Supreme Court Justice Ambrose Spencer and State Senator John Tayler "declared open war against the bank." Lt. Gov. DeWitt Clinton told his brother-in-law, and close political ally of many years, Ambrose Spencer that he would, if necessary, vote against the charter (as Lt. Gov. he had only a casting vote in the Senate), but that he would not make the issue a question of party discipline, leaving it to the Democratic-Republican legislators to vote as they thought fit. This led to Spencer's joining the Anti-Clintonians shortly thereafter. The Assembly passed the bill to charter the bank in second reading with a vote of 52 to 46. The bill then went to the Senate, and a motion was made to reject it, but was voted down 15 to 13. To avoid the bill going through, on March 27, Gov. Tompkins prorogued the Legislature until May 21, saying that proof had been furnished that the bankers had bribed legislators to vote for the charter. After the Legislature met again, the bank charter was passed in the Senate by a vote of 17 to 13, and in third reading in the Assembly by a vote of 58 to 39. In 1813, the bank asked the Legislature to cancel the payment of the bonus, which had been a condition sine qua non of the charter, and only $100,000 were actually paid into the Common School Fund.

On May 28, a caucus of Dem.-Rep. legislators, presided over by James W. Wilkin, nominated DeWitt Clinton for U.S. president. On June 18, the United States declared War against Great Britain, and the Legislature adjourned on the next day.

== State Senate ==
=== Districts ===
- The Southern District (5 seats) consisted of Kings, New York, Queens, Richmond, Suffolk and Westchester counties.
- The Middle District (7 seats) consisted of Dutchess, Orange, Ulster, Columbia, Delaware, Rockland, Greene and Sullivan counties.
- The Eastern District (8 seats) consisted of Washington, Clinton, Rensselaer, Albany, Saratoga, Essex, Montgomery, Franklin and Schenectady counties.
- The Western District (12 seats) consisted of Herkimer, Ontario, Otsego, Tioga, Onondaga, Schoharie, Steuben, Chenango, Oneida, Cayuga, Genesee, Seneca, Jefferson, Lewis, St. Lawrence, Allegany, Broome, Madison, Niagara, Cortland, Cattaraugus and Chautauqua counties.
Note: There are now 62 counties in the State of New York. The counties which are not mentioned in this list had not yet been established, or sufficiently organized, the area being included in one or more of the abovementioned counties.

=== Members ===
The asterisk (*) denotes members of the previous Legislature who continued in office as members of this Legislature. Nathan Sanford changed from the Assembly to the Senate.

District	Senators	Term left	Party	Notes
Southern	Benjamin Coe*	1 year	Dem.-Rep.	
Southern	William W. Gilbert*	1 year	Dem.-Rep.	elected to the Council of Appointment
Southern	Israel Carll*	2 years	Dem.-Rep.	
Southern	Ebenezer White*	3 years	Dem.-Rep.	
Southern	Nathan Sanford*	4 years	Dem.-Rep.	also United States Attorney for the District of New York
Middle	Edward P. Livingston*	1 year	Dem.-Rep.	
Middle	Johannes Bruyn*	2 years	Dem.-Rep.	elected to the Council of Appointment
Middle	Samuel Haight*	2 years	Dem.-Rep.	
Middle	Morgan Lewis*	3 years	Dem.-Rep.	
Middle	James W. Wilkin*	3 years	Dem.-Rep.	
Middle	Erastus Root	4 years	Dem.-Rep.	
Middle	William Taber	4 years	Dem.-Rep.	
Eastern	David Hopkins*	1 year	Federalist	
Eastern	Daniel Paris*	2 years	Federalist	
Eastern	John Stearns*	2 years	Federalist	
Eastern	Henry Yates Jr.*	3 years	Dem.-Rep.	elected to the Council of Appointment
Eastern	Elisha Arnold	4 years	Dem.-Rep.	
Eastern	Kitchel Bishop	4 years	Dem.-Rep.	
Eastern	Ruggles Hubbard	4 years	Dem.-Rep.	
Eastern	John Tayler*	4 years	Dem.-Rep.	
Western	Francis A. Bloodgood*	1 year	Dem.-Rep.	elected to the Council of Appointment
Western	Walter Martin*	1 year	Dem.-Rep.	
Western	Luther Rich*	1 year	Dem.-Rep.	
Western	Sylvanus Smalley*	1 year	Dem.-Rep.	
Western	Amos Hall*	2 years	Federalist	
Western	Seth Phelps*	2 years	Federalist	
Western	Jonas Platt*	2 years	Federalist	
Western	Reuben Humphrey*	3 years	Dem.-Rep.	
Western	Nathan Smith*	3 years	Dem.-Rep.	
Western	Philetus Swift*	3 years	Dem.-Rep.	
Western	Henry A. Townsend*	3 years	Dem.-Rep.	
Western	Casper M. Rouse	4 years	Dem.-Rep.	

=== Employees ===
- Clerk: Sebastian Visscher

== State Assembly ==
=== Districts ===
- Albany County (4 seats)
- Allegany and Steuben counties (1 seat)
- Broome County (1 seat)
- Cattaraugus, Chautauqua and Niagara counties (1 seat)
- Cayuga County (3 seats)
- Chenango County (3 seats)
- Clinton and Franklin counties (1 seat)
- Columbia County (4 seats)
- Cortland County (1 seat)
- Delaware County (2 seats)
- Dutchess County (6 seats)
- Essex County (1 seat)
- Genesee County (1 seat)
- Greene County (2 seats)
- Herkimer County (3 seats)
- Jefferson County (2 seats)
- Kings County (1 seat)
- Lewis County (1 seat)
- Madison County (3 seats)
- Montgomery County (5 seats)
- The City and County of New York (11 seats)
- Oneida County (5 seats)
- Onondaga County (2 seats)
- Ontario County (5 seats)
- Orange County (4 seats)
- Otsego County (4 seats)
- Queens County (3 seats)
- Rensselaer County (4 seats)
- Richmond County (1 seat)
- Rockland County (1 seat)
- St. Lawrence County (1 seat)
- Saratoga County (4 seats)
- Schenectady County (2 seats)
- Schoharie County (2 seats)
- Seneca County (1 seat)
- Suffolk County (3 seats)
- Sullivan and Ulster counties (4 seats)
- Tioga County (1 seat)
- Washington County (5 seats)
- Westchester County (3 seats)
Note: There are now 62 counties in the State of New York. The counties which are not mentioned in this list had not yet been established, or sufficiently organized, the area being included in one or more of the abovementioned counties.

=== Assemblymen ===
The asterisk (*) denotes members of the previous Legislature who continued as members of this Legislature.

District	Assemblymen	Party	Notes
Albany	Asa Colvard	Federalist	
Albany	Jesse Tyler	Federalist	
Albany	Abraham Van Vechten*	Federalist	
Albany	John G. Van Zandt	Federalist	
Allegany and Steuben	Jacob Teeple		
Broome	Chauncey Hyde	Dem.-Rep.	
Cattaraugus, Chautauqua and Niagara	Ebenezer Walden		
Cayuga	Stephen Close*	Dem.-Rep.	
Cayuga	Humphrey Howland		
Cayuga	Thomas Ludlow	Dem.-Rep.	
Chenango	Samuel Campbell		
Chenango	Silas Holmes		
Chenango	Denison Randall		
Clinton and Franklin	Gates Hoit*	Federalist	
Columbia	Thomas Brodhead		
Columbia	Thomas P. Grosvenor*	Federalist	
Columbia	Timothy Oakley		
Columbia	Jacob R. Van Rensselaer*	Federalist	
Cortland	Billy Trowbridge*		
Delaware	Daniel H. Burr	Dem.-Rep.	
Delaware	Isaac Ogden	Dem.-Rep.	
Dutchess	Joseph Arnold		
Dutchess	Cyrus Benjamin		
Dutchess	Isaac Bryan		
Dutchess	Henry Dodge	Federalist	
Dutchess	John Warren		
Dutchess	Robert Weeks		
Essex	Delevan Delance*		
Genesee	Zacheus Colby		
Greene	John Ely		
Greene	Simon Sayre		
Herkimer	Robert Burch*	Dem.-Rep.	
Herkimer	Rudolph I. Shoemaker	Dem.-Rep.	
Herkimer	Samuel Woodworth		
Jefferson	David I. Andrus	Dem.-Rep.	
Jefferson	John Durkee		
Kings	John C. Vanderveer*	Dem.-Rep.	
Lewis	Willam Darrow		
Madison	Bennett Bicknell	Dem.-Rep.	
Madison	Nathaniel Cole	Dem.-Rep.	
Madison	Samuel H. Coon	Dem.-Rep.	
Montgomery	John Fay	Dem.-Rep.	
Montgomery	Daniel Hurlbut*		
Montgomery	Archibald McIntyre	Dem.-Rep.	also New York State Comptroller
Montgomery	George H. Nellis*		
Montgomery	Alexander Sheldon	Dem.-Rep.	elected Speaker
New York	Thomas Carpenter*	Federalist	
New York	Isaac S. Douglass	Federalist	
New York	James Heard	Federalist	
New York	Samuel Jones Jr.	Federalist	
New York	Jacob Lorillard	Federalist	
New York	Thomas R. Mercein*	Federalist	
New York	Peter W. Radcliff	Federalist	
New York	Abraham Russell	Federalist	
New York	Isaac Sebring*	Federalist	
New York	James Smith	Federalist	
New York	James Tylee	Federalist	
Oneida	Isaac Brayton*	Federalist	
Oneida	Joel Bristol	Federalist	
Oneida	Erastus Clark	Federalist	
Oneida	George Huntington*	Federalist	
Oneida	John Storrs*	Federalist	
Onondaga	Barnet Mooney	Dem.-Rep.	
Onondaga	Jonathan Stanley Jr.	Dem.-Rep.	
Ontario	Nathaniel Allen		
Ontario	Valentine Brother	Federalist	
Ontario	David Sutherland		
Ontario	Joshua Vanfleet		
Ontario	Ezra Waite		
Orange	John Gasherie		died March 8, 1812
Orange	Peter Holbert		
Orange	Seth Marvin*		
Orange	William Ross*	Dem.-Rep.	
Otsego	Daniel Hawks*		
Otsego	Isaac Hayes*	Dem.-Rep.	
Otsego	Elijah H. Metcalf*	Dem.-Rep.	
Otsego	Robert Roseboom*	Dem.-Rep.	
Queens	Stephen Carman*	Federalist	
Queens	John Fleet	Federalist	
Queens	Daniel Kissam*	Federalist	
Rensselaer	George Gardner		
Rensselaer	Stephen Gregory		
Rensselaer	Abraham L. Viele		
Rensselaer	Stephen Warren		
Richmond	James Guyon, Jr.	Dem.-Rep.	
Rockland	Peter S. Van Orden*	Dem.-Rep.	
St. Lawrence	Roswell Hopkins*	Federalist	
Saratoga	Joel Keeler		
Saratoga	Zebulon Mott		
Saratoga	Avery Starkweather		
Saratoga	John W. Taylor	Dem.-Rep.	
Schenectady	James Boyd*	Dem.-Rep.	
Schenectady	John Young*	Dem.-Rep.	
Schoharie	Henry Hager*	Dem.-Rep.	
Schoharie	John Redington	Dem.-Rep.	
Seneca	Oliver C. Comstock	Dem.-Rep.	from May 27, 1812, also First Judge of the Seneca County Court
Suffolk	Usher H. Moore	Dem.-Rep.	
Suffolk	Nathaniel Potter	Dem.-Rep.	
Suffolk	Abraham Rose	Dem.-Rep.	
Sullivan and Ulster	Jacob Coddington	Dem.-Rep.	
Sullivan and Ulster	Abraham I. Hardenbergh	Dem.-Rep.	
Sullivan and Ulster	Henry Jansen	Dem.-Rep.	
Sullivan and Ulster	Elnathan Sears	Dem.-Rep.	
Tioga	Henry Wells		
Washington	Lyman Hall	Dem.-Rep.	
Washington	James Hill	Dem.-Rep.	
Washington	John Kirtland	Dem.-Rep.	
Washington	Alexander Livingston	Dem.-Rep.	
Washington	Halsey Rogers		
Westchester	Darius Crosby*	Dem.-Rep.	
Westchester	Abraham Miller*	Dem.-Rep.	
Westchester	Jacob Odell*	Dem.-Rep.	

=== Employees ===
- Clerk: Samuel North
- Sergeant-at-Arms: Thomas Donnelly
- Doorkeeper: Benjamin Whipple

== Sources ==
- The New York Civil List compiled by Franklin Benjamin Hough (Weed, Parsons and Co., 1858) [see pg. 108f for Senate districts; pg. 121 for senators; pg. 148f for Assembly districts; pg. 185f for assemblymen]
- The History of Political Parties in the State of New-York, from the Ratification of the Federal Constitution to 1840 by Jabez D. Hammond (4th ed., Vol. 1, H. & E. Phinney, Cooperstown, 1846; pages 291–316)
- Election result Assembly, Albany Co. at project "A New Nation Votes", compiled by Phil Lampi, hosted by Tufts University Digital Library
- Election result Assembly, Broome Co. at project "A New Nation Votes"
- Election result Assembly, Clinton and Franklin Co. at project "A New Nation Votes"
- Election result Assembly, Cortland Co. at project "A New Nation Votes"
- Election result Assembly, Delaware Co. at project "A New Nation Votes"
- Election result Assembly, Essex Co. at project "A New Nation Votes"
- Election result Assembly, Greene Co. at project "A New Nation Votes"
- Election result Assembly, Jefferson Co. at project "A New Nation Votes"
- Election result Assembly, Kings Co. at project "A New Nation Votes"
- Election result Assembly, Madison Co. at project "A New Nation Votes"
- Election result Assembly, Onondaga Co. at project "A New Nation Votes"
- Election result Assembly, Onondaga Co. at project "A New Nation Votes"
- Election result Assembly, Queens Co. at project "A New Nation Votes"
- Election result Assembly, Richmond Co. at project "A New Nation Votes"
- Election result Assembly, Schenectady Co. at project "A New Nation Votes"
- Election result Assembly, Schoharie Co. at project "A New Nation Votes"
- Election result Assembly, Suffolk Co. at project "A New Nation Votes"
- Election result Assembly, Westchester Co. at project "A New Nation Votes"
- Election result Senate, Southern D. at project "A New Nation Votes"
- Election result Senate, Middle D. at project "A New Nation Votes"
- Election result Senate, Eastern D. at project "A New Nation Votes"
- Election result Senate, Western D. at project "A New Nation Votes"
- Election result, Council of Appointment at project "A New Nation Votes"
