= 36th New York State Legislature =

New York state legislative session

←	35th	37th	→
- The Old State Capitol (1879)

Overview
- Legislative body: New York State Legislature
- Jurisdiction: New York, United States
- Term: July 1, 1812 – June 30, 1813

Senate
- Members: 32
- President: Lt. Gov. DeWitt Clinton (Dem.-Rep.)
- Party control: Clintonian (19-8-4)

Assembly
- Members: 112
- Speaker: Jacob R. Van Rensselaer (Fed.)
- Party control: Federalist (58-29-22)

Sessions
- 1st: November 3 – 11, 1812
- 2nd: January 12 – April 13, 1813

The 36th New York State Legislature, consisting of the New York State Senate and the New York State Assembly, met from November 3, 1812, to April 13, 1813, during the sixth year of Daniel D. Tompkins's governorship, in Albany.

== Background ==
Under the provisions of the New York Constitution of 1777, amended by the Constitutional Convention of 1801, 32 Senators were elected on general tickets in the four senatorial districts for four-year terms. They were divided into four classes, and every year eight Senate seats came up for election. Assemblymen were elected countywide on general tickets to a one-year term, the whole Assembly being renewed annually.

In 1797, Albany was declared the State capital, and all subsequent Legislatures have been meeting there ever since. In 1799, the Legislature enacted that future Legislatures meet on the last Tuesday of January of each year unless called earlier by the governor.

At this time the politicians were divided into two opposing political parties: the Federalists and the Democratic-Republicans.

== Elections ==
The State election was held from April 28 to 30, 1812. Senator Francis A. Bloodgood (Western D.) was re-elected. Elbert H. Jones (Southern D.), Martin Van Buren (Middle D.), Gerrit Wendell ( Eastern D.), Russell Attwater, Archibald S. Clarke (both Western D.); and Assemblymen Peter W. Radcliff (Southern D.) and Henry Hager (Western D.) were also elected to the Senate. Jones, Radcliff and Wendell were Federalists, the other five were Democratic-Republicans.

On May 28, a caucus of Dem.-Rep. legislators nominated DeWitt Clinton for U.S. president. On June 18, the United States declared War against Great Britain. The Federalists opposed the war; the Democratic-Republican Party split into two factions: the Clintonians (supporters of DeWitt Clinton and mostly opposed to the war) and the Madisonians (supporters of President James Madison and the war).

In September 1812, State Treasurer David Thomas was arrested in Chenango County on a warrant issued by Supreme Court Justice Ambrose Spencer, and tried before Justice William W. Van Ness, for an attempt to bribe State Senator Casper M. Rouse to vote for the chartering of the Bank of America during the previous session of the Legislature, but was acquitted by the jury. At the same time, Solomon Southwick was tried in Montgomery County before Chief Justice James Kent, for an attempt to bribe Alexander Sheldon, then Speaker of the Assembly, for the same purpose, but was also found not guilty.

== Sessions ==
The Legislature met at the Old State Capitol in Albany on November 3, 1812, to elect presidential electors; and adjourned on November 11.

Jacob R. Van Rensselaer (Fed.) was elected Speaker with 58 votes against 46 for William Ross (Dem.-Rep.). James Van Ingen (Fed.) was again elected Clerk of the Assembly with 57 votes against 46 for John F. Bacon (Dem.-Rep.).

Although the Democratic-Republicans had a small majority on joint ballot, and should have supported the party's caucus nominee, the Madisonians refused to support Clinton. The Assembly nominated Federalist electors (vote: Fed. 58, Clinton 29, Madison 22). The Senate nominated Clintonian electors (vote: Clinton 19, Fed. 9, Madison 4). On November 9, 1812, the Legislature proceeded to a joint ballot and elected the Clintonian ticket with a vote of 74 to 45, the Madisonians cast 28 blank ballots. The 29 electors chosen were: Joseph C. Yates, Simeon De Witt, Archibald McIntyre, John C. Hogeboom, Gurdon S. Mumford, Jacob De La Montagnie, Philip Van Cortlandt, John Chandler, Henry Huntington, John Woodworth, David Boyd, Cornelius Bergen, Joseph Perine, Chauncey Belknap, George Rosecrantz, John Dill, David Van Ness, Robert Jenkins, Michael S. Vandecook, George Palmer Jr., James Hill, William Kirby, Henry Frey Yates, Thomas H. Hubbard, John Russell, James S. Kipp, Jotham Jayne, Jonathan Stanley Jr. and William Burnet. They cast their votes for DeWitt Clinton and Jared Ingersoll.

The Legislature met for the regular session on January 12, 1813; and the Assembly adjourned on April 12, the Senate on April 13.

On January 12, the Federalist majority of the Assembly elected a new Council of Appointment which removed almost all Democratic-Republican office-holders.

On February 2, the Legislature elected Rufus King (Fed.) to succeed John Smith (Dem.-Rep.) as U.S. Senator from New York for a term beginning on March 4, 1813.

On February 10, the Legislature elected Charles Z. Platt (Fed.) to succeed David Thomas (Dem.-Rep.) as New York State Treasurer.

== State Senate ==
=== Districts ===
- The Southern District (5 seats) consisted of Kings, New York, Queens, Richmond, Suffolk and Westchester counties.
- The Middle District (7 seats) consisted of Dutchess, Orange, Ulster, Columbia, Delaware, Rockland, Greene and Sullivan counties.
- The Eastern District (8 seats) consisted of Washington, Clinton, Rensselaer, Albany, Saratoga, Essex, Montgomery, Franklin and Schenectady counties.
- The Western District (12 seats) consisted of Herkimer, Ontario, Otsego, Tioga, Onondaga, Schoharie, Steuben, Chenango, Oneida, Cayuga, Genesee, Seneca, Jefferson, Lewis, St. Lawrence, Allegany, Broome, Madison, Niagara, Cortland, Cattaraugus and Chautauqua counties.
Note: There are now 62 counties in the State of New York. The counties which are not mentioned in this list had not yet been established, or sufficiently organized, the area being included in one or more of the abovementioned counties.

=== Members ===
The asterisk (*) denotes members of the previous Legislature who continued in office as members of this Legislature. Peter W. Radcliff and Henry Hager changed from the Assembly to the Senate.

District	Senators	Term left	Party	Notes
Southern	Israel Carll*	1 year	Dem.-Rep.	
Southern	Ebenezer White*	2 years	Dem.-Rep.	
Southern	Nathan Sanford*	3 years	Dem.-Rep.	also United States Attorney for the District of New York
Southern	Elbert H. Jones	4 years	Federalist	
Southern	Peter W. Radcliff*	4 years	Federalist	elected to the Council of Appointment
Middle	Johannes Bruyn*	1 year	Dem.-Rep.	
Middle	Samuel Haight*	1 year	Dem.-Rep.	
Middle	Morgan Lewis*	2 years	Dem.-Rep.	
Middle	James W. Wilkin*	2 years	Dem.-Rep.	elected to the Council of Appointment
Middle	Erastus Root*	3 years	Dem.-Rep.	
Middle	William Taber*	3 years	Dem.-Rep.	
Middle	Martin Van Buren	4 years	Dem.-Rep.	until March 19, 1813, also Surrogate of Columbia Co.
Eastern	Daniel Paris*	1 year	Federalist	
Eastern	John Stearns*	1 year	Federalist	elected to the Council of Appointment
Eastern	Henry Yates Jr.*	2 years	Dem.-Rep.	
Eastern	Elisha Arnold*	3 years	Dem.-Rep.	
Eastern	Kitchel Bishop*	3 years	Dem.-Rep.	
Eastern	Ruggles Hubbard*	3 years	Dem.-Rep.	
Eastern	John Tayler*	3 years	Dem.-Rep.	
Eastern	Gerrit Wendell	4 years	Federalist	
Western	Amos Hall*	1 year	Federalist	
Western	Seth Phelps*	1 year	Federalist	
Western	Jonas Platt*	1 year	Federalist	elected to the Council of Appointment
Western	Reuben Humphrey*	2 years	Dem.-Rep.	
Western	Nathan Smith*	2 years	Dem.-Rep.	
Western	Philetus Swift*	2 years	Dem.-Rep.	
Western	Henry A. Townsend*	2 years	Dem.-Rep.	
Western	Casper M. Rouse*	3 years	Dem.-Rep.	
Western	Russell Attwater	4 years	Dem.-Rep.	
Western	Francis A. Bloodgood*	4 years	Dem.-Rep.	
Western	Archibald S. Clarke	4 years	Dem.-Rep.	
Western	Henry Hager*	4 years	Dem.-Rep.	

=== Employees ===
- Clerk: Sebastian Visscher

== State Assembly ==
=== Districts ===
- Albany County (4 seats)
- Allegany and Steuben counties (1 seat)
- Broome County (1 seat)
- Cattaraugus, Chautauqua and Niagara counties (1 seat)
- Cayuga County (3 seats)
- Chenango County (3 seats)
- Clinton and Franklin counties (1 seat)
- Columbia County (4 seats)
- Cortland County (1 seat)
- Delaware County (2 seats)
- Dutchess County (6 seats)
- Essex County (1 seat)
- Genesee County (1 seat)
- Greene County (2 seats)
- Herkimer County (3 seats)
- Jefferson County (2 seats)
- Kings County (1 seat)
- Lewis County (1 seat)
- Madison County (3 seats)
- Montgomery County (5 seats)
- The City and County of New York (11 seats)
- Oneida County (5 seats)
- Onondaga County (2 seats)
- Ontario County (5 seats)
- Orange County (4 seats)
- Otsego County (4 seats)
- Queens County (3 seats)
- Rensselaer County (4 seats)
- Richmond County (1 seat)
- Rockland County (1 seat)
- St. Lawrence County (1 seat)
- Saratoga County (4 seats)
- Schenectady County (2 seats)
- Schoharie County (2 seats)
- Seneca County (1 seat)
- Suffolk County (3 seats)
- Sullivan and Ulster counties (4 seats)
- Tioga County (1 seat)
- Washington County (5 seats)
- Westchester County (3 seats)
Note: There are now 62 counties in the State of New York. The counties which are not mentioned in this list had not yet been established, or sufficiently organized, the area being included in one or more of the abovementioned counties.

=== Assemblymen ===
The asterisk (*) denotes members of the previous Legislature who continued as members of this Legislature.

District	Assemblymen	Party	Notes
Albany	David Bogardus	Federalist	
Albany	John Gibbons	Federalist	
Albany	Elishama Janes	Federalist	
Albany	Abraham Van Vechten*	Federalist	from February 13, 1813, also New York Attorney General
Allegany and Steuben	Jacob Teeple*		
Broome	Chauncey Hyde*	Dem.-Rep.	
Cattaraugus, Chautauqua and Niagara	Jonas Williams	Dem.-Rep.	
Cayuga	William C. Bennet	Dem.-Rep.	
Cayuga	Thomas Ludlow*	Dem.-Rep.	
Cayuga	William Satterlee	Dem.-Rep.	
Chenango	Nathaniel Medbury		
Chenango	Ebenezer Wakley	Dem.-Rep.	
Chenango	Thornton Wasson		
Clinton and Franklin	Allen R. Moore	Federalist	
Columbia	Aaron Olmsted	Federalist	death announced on January 27, 1813
Columbia	Alan Sheldon	Federalist	
Columbia	Jacob R. Van Rensselaer*	Federalist	elected Speaker; from February 23, 1813, also Secretary of State of New York
Columbia	Elisha Williams	Federalist	
Cortland	Billy Trowbridge*		
Delaware	Robert Clark	Dem.-Rep.	
Delaware	Andrew Craig Jr.		
Dutchess	Joseph Arnold*		
Dutchess	John Beadle	Federalist	
Dutchess	Cyrus Benjamin*		
Dutchess	Isaac Bryan*		
Dutchess	Henry Dodge*	Federalist	
Dutchess	John Warren*		
Essex	Manoah Miller		
Genesee	James Ganson	Dem.-Rep.	
Greene	John Adams	Federalist	
Greene	Perez Steele	Federalist	
Herkimer	John Graves	Dem.-Rep.	
Herkimer	Hosea Nelson	Dem.-Rep.	
Herkimer	Rudolph I. Shoemaker*	Dem.-Rep.	
Jefferson	Clark Allen	Federalist	
Jefferson	Egbert Ten Eyck	Federalist	
Kings	John C. Vanderveer*	Dem.-Rep.	
Lewis	Levi Collins		
Madison	Walter Beecher	Dem.-Rep.	
Madison	John D. Henry	Federalist	
Madison	Jonathan Olmsted	Dem.-Rep.	
Montgomery	Josiah Bartlett		death announced January 29, 1813
Montgomery	Daniel Cady	Federalist	from February 28 to April 6, 1813, also District Attorney of the 5th D.
Montgomery	Daniel McVean		
Montgomery	Simon Maybie		
Montgomery	Richard Van Horne	Federalist	
New York	Thomas Carpenter*	Federalist	
New York	Jameson Cox		
New York	Isaac S. Douglass*	Federalist	
New York	Richard Hatfield Jr.		
New York	William Henderson		
New York	Josiah Ogden Hoffman	Federalist	from February 8, 1813, also Recorder of New York City
New York	Samuel Jones Jr.*	Federalist	
New York	Jacob Lorillard*	Federalist	
New York	Abraham Russell*	Federalist	
New York	Isaac Sebring*	Federalist	
New York	James Smith*	Federalist	
Oneida	Josiah Bacon		
Oneida	Erastus Clark*	Federalist	
Oneida	George Huntington*	Federalist	
Oneida	John Lay		
Oneida	Nathan Townsend		
Onondaga	Moses Nash	Dem.-Rep.	
Onondaga	Isaac Smith	Dem.-Rep.	
Ontario	Abraham Dox		
Ontario	Gilbert Howell	Dem.-Rep.	
Ontario	Hugh McNair		
Ontario	David Sutherland*		
Ontario	Asahel Warner	Dem.-Rep.	
Orange	John Blake Jr.		
Orange	David Dill	Dem.-Rep.	
Orange	William Ross*	Dem.-Rep.	
Orange	John Wheeler		
Otsego	Erastus Crafts		
Otsego	Abel DeForest		
Otsego	Samuel Griffin		
Otsego	James Hyde	Federalist	
Queens	Stephen Carman*	Federalist	
Queens	John Fleet*	Federalist	
Queens	David Kissam	Federalist	or Daniel*?
Rensselaer	David Allen	Federalist	
Rensselaer	James H. Ball		
Rensselaer	John Carpenter Jr.		
Rensselaer	John Stevens	Federalist	
Richmond	James Guyon, Jr.*	Dem.-Rep.	
Rockland	Peter S. Van Orden*	Dem.-Rep.	
St. Lawrence	Roswell Hopkins*	Federalist	
Saratoga	Caleb Holmes		
Saratoga	John Prior		
Saratoga	John W. Taylor*	Dem.-Rep.	in December 1812, elected to the 13th United States Congress
Saratoga	Calvin Wheeler		
Schenectady	Alexander Combs	Dem.-Rep.	
Schenectady	Joseph Shurtleff	Federalist	
Schoharie	Heman Hickock	Dem.-Rep.	
Schoharie	Peter A. Hilton		
Seneca	James McCall		
Suffolk	Henry Rhodes		
Suffolk	Caleb Smith		
Suffolk	Benjamin F. Thompson		
Sullivan and Ulster	Jacob Coddington*	Dem.-Rep.	
Sullivan and Ulster	Abraham I. Hardenbergh*	Dem.-Rep.	
Sullivan and Ulster	Henry Jansen*	Dem.-Rep.	
Sullivan and Ulster	Elnathan Sears*	Dem.-Rep.	
Tioga	Jabez Beers		
Washington	John Beebee	Federalist	
Washington	Jason Kellogg	Dem.-Rep.	
Washington	Francis McLean	Dem.-Rep.	
Washington	Ebenezer Russell	Federalist	
Washington	Melancton Wheeler	Federalist	
Westchester	William Barker	Federalist	
Westchester	Abraham Miller*	Dem.-Rep.	
Westchester	vacant		

=== Employees ===
- Clerk: James Van Ingen
- Sergeant-at-Arms: Thomas Donnelly
- Doorkeeper: Benjamin Whipple

== Sources ==
- The New York Civil List compiled by Franklin Benjamin Hough (Weed, Parsons and Co., 1858) [see pg. 108f for Senate districts; pg. 121 for senators; pg. 148f for Assembly districts; pg. 186f for assemblymen; pg. 325 for presidential election]
- The History of Political Parties in the State of New-York, from the Ratification of the Federal Constitution to 1840 by Jabez D. Hammond (4th ed., Vol. 1, H. & E. Phinney, Cooperstown, 1846; pages 311-322)
- Election result Assembly, Albany Co. at project "A New Nation Votes", compiled by Phil Lampi, hosted by Tufts University Digital Library
- Election result Assembly, Cattaraugus, Chautauqua and Niagara Co. at project "A New Nation Votes"
- Election result Assembly, Cayuga Co. at project "A New Nation Votes"
- Partial election result Assembly, Clinton and Franklin Co. at project "A New Nation Votes" [gives only votes from Clinton Co.]
- Election result Assembly, Columbia Co. at project "A New Nation Votes"
- Election result Assembly, Greene Co. at project "A New Nation Votes"
- Election result Assembly, Herkimer Co. at project "A New Nation Votes"
- Election result Assembly, Jefferson Co. at project "A New Nation Votes"
- Election result Assembly, Kings Co. at project "A New Nation Votes"
- Election result Assembly, Madison Co. at project "A New Nation Votes"
- Election result Assembly, Onondaga Co. at project "A New Nation Votes"
- Election result Assembly, Orange Co. at project "A New Nation Votes"
- Election result Assembly, Queens Co. at project "A New Nation Votes"
- Election result Assembly, Richmond Co. at project "A New Nation Votes"
- Election result Assembly, Schenectady Co. at project "A New Nation Votes"
- Partial election result Assembly, Sullivan and Ulster Co. at project "A New Nation Votes" [gives votes from Sullivan Co.]
- Partial election result Assembly, Sullivan and Ulster Co. at project "A New Nation Votes" [gives votes from Ulster Co.]
- Election result Assembly, Washington Co. at project "A New Nation Votes"
- Election result Senate, Southern D. at project "A New Nation Votes"
- Election result Senate, Middle D. at project "A New Nation Votes"
- Election result Senate, Eastern D. at project "A New Nation Votes"
- Election result Senate, Western D. at project "A New Nation Votes"
- Election result, Speaker at project "A New Nation Votes"
- Election result, Assembly Clerk at project "A New Nation Votes"
- Election result, Council of Appointment at project "A New Nation Votes"
