= Henry Jansen =

Henry Jansen or Janssen may refer to:

- Henry J. Janssen (1860–1922), member of the Wisconsin State Assembly
- Henry Jansen (politician), see 35th and 36th New York State Legislature
- Henry Janssen of the Janssen baronets
- Henry Janssen (Canadian football), see 1974 CFL draft
- Henry Jansen, musician with Dovetail Joint
