= United States Department of War =

Former US government agency (1789–1947)

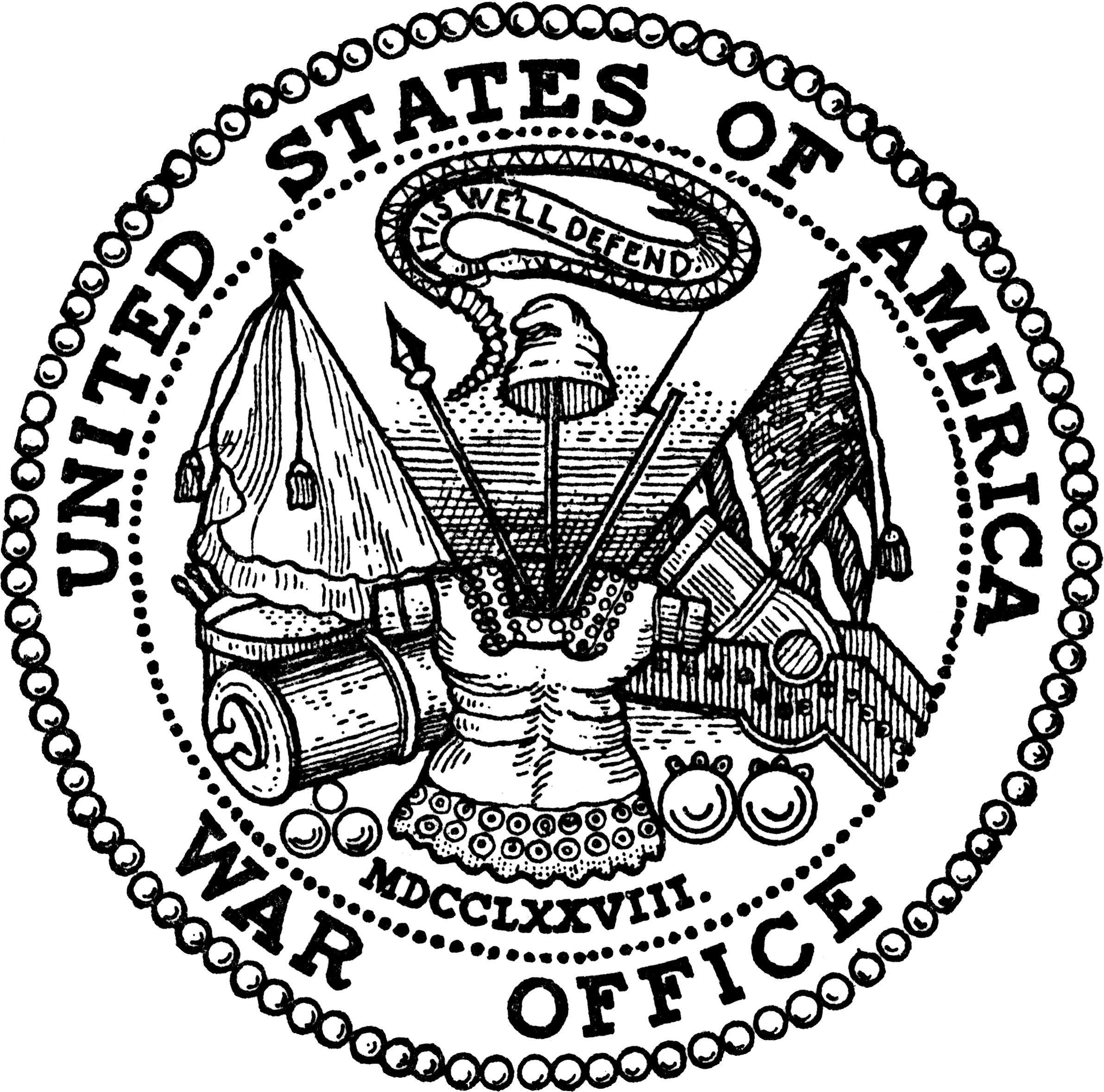
- Seal of the U.S. Department of War from 1880 to 1947

Department overview
- Formed: August 7, 1789; 237 years ago
- Preceding department: Board of War and Ordnance
- Dissolved: September 18, 1947; 79 years ago
- Superseding agencies: National Military Establishment; Department of the Army; Department of the Air Force
- Department executive: Secretary of War
- Child department: U.S. Army

The United States Department of War, also called the War Department (and occasionally War Office in the early years), was the United States Cabinet department responsible for the operation and maintenance of the United States Army. It also had responsibility for naval affairs from 1794 until the establishment of the Department of the Navy in 1798, and for most non-naval air forces until the creation of the Department of the Air Force on September 18, 1947.

The secretary of war, a civilian with such responsibilities as finance and purchases and a minor role in directing military affairs, headed the War Department throughout its existence.

The War Department existed for 158 years, from August 7, 1789, to September 18, 1947, when, under the National Security Act of 1947, it split into the Department of the Army and the Department of the Air Force (which, together with the Department of the Navy, formed the National Military Establishment). In 1949, the National Military Establishment was renamed the Department of Defense.

== History ==
The seal of the Board of War and Ordnance, which the U.S. War Department's seal is derived from. The War Department used this seal until 1880

The emblem of the Department of the Army, derived from the seal of the U.S. War Department

=== 18th century ===
The Department of War traces its origins to the committees created by the Second Continental Congress in 1775 to oversee the Revolutionary War. Individual committees were formed for each issue, including committees to secure ammunition, to raise funds for gunpowder, and to organize a national militia. These committees were consolidated into the Board of War and Ordnance in 1776, operated by members of Congress. A second board was created in 1777, the Board of War, to operate separately from Congress. The Congress of the Confederation eventually replaced the system of boards with the Department of War. Only five positions were created within the department upon its creation: the secretary at war, an assistant, a secretary, and two clerks.

Shortly after the establishment of a government under President George Washington in 1789, Congress reestablished the War Department as a civilian agency to administer the field army under the president (as commander-in-chief) and the secretary of war. Retired senior General Henry Knox, then in civilian life, served as the first United States secretary of war. When the department was created, the president was authorized to appoint two inspectors to oversee the troops. Congress created several additional offices over the course of the 1790s, including the major general, brigadier general, quartermaster general, chaplain, surgeon general, adjutant general, superintendent of military stores, paymaster general, judge advocate, inspector general, physician general, apothecary general, purveyor, and accountant.

Forming and organizing the department and the army fell to Secretary Knox, while direct field command of the small Regular Army fell to President Washington. In 1798, Congress authorized President John Adams to create a second provisional army under the command of former president Washington in anticipation of the Quasi-War, but this army was never utilized. The Department of War was also responsible for overseeing interactions with Native Americans in its early years.

On November 8, 1800, the War Department building with its records and files was consumed by fire.

=== 19th century ===
The United States Military Academy at West Point and the Army Corps of Engineers were established in 1802. The Department of War was reduced in size following the end of the Quasi-War in 1802, but it was subsequently expanded in the years leading up to the War of 1812. To accommodate this expansion, sub-departments were created within the department, with each one led by a general staff officer. These sub-departments were reformed into a modern system of bureaus by Secretary of War John C. Calhoun in 1818. Secretary Calhoun created the Bureau of Indian Affairs in 1824, which served as the main agency within the War Department for addressing the issues regarding Native Americans until 1849, when Congress transferred it to the newly founded Department of the Interior. The U.S. Soldiers' Home was created in 1851.

During the American Civil War, the War Department responsibilities expanded. It handled the recruiting, training, supply, medical care, transportation and pay of two million soldiers, comprising both the regular army and the much larger temporary volunteer army. A separate command structure took charge of military operations.

In the late stages of the war, the department took charge of refugees and freedmen (freed slaves) in the American South through the Bureau of Refugees, Freedmen and Abandoned Lands. During the Reconstruction era, this bureau played a major role in supporting the new Republican governments in the southern states. When military Reconstruction ended in 1877, the U.S. Army removed the last troops from military occupation of the American South, and the last Republican state governments in the region ended.

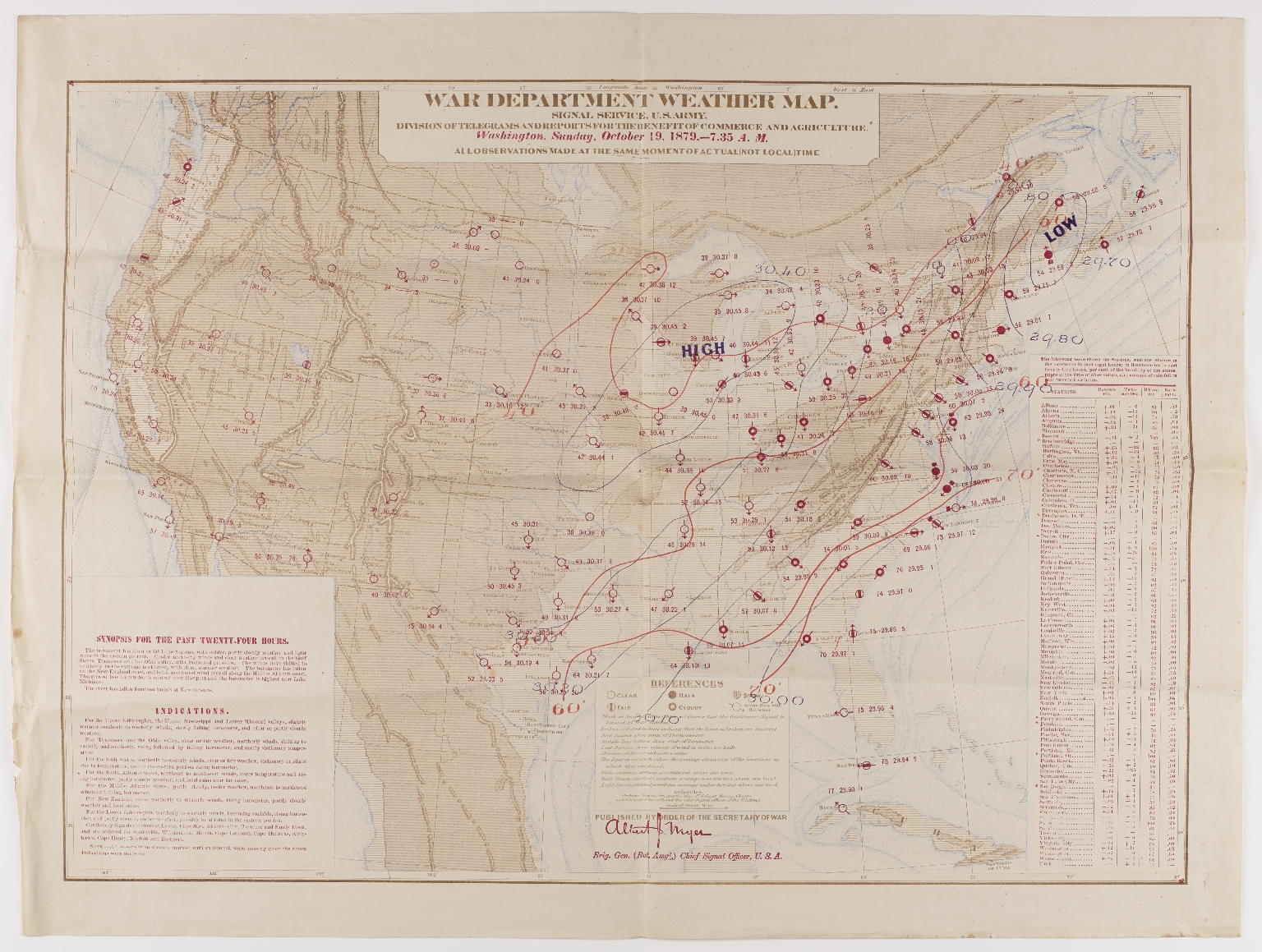
U.S. War Department weather map depicting weather conditions on October 21, 1879, over New England at 7:35 am. Produced for the U.S. Army during the War of the Pacific.

The Army comprised hundreds of small detachments in forts around the West, dealing with Indians, and in coastal artillery units in port cities, dealing with the threat of a naval attack.

=== 1898–1939 ===
The United States Army, with 39,000 men in 1890 was the smallest and least powerful army of any major power in the late 19th century. By contrast, France had an army of 542,000. Temporary volunteers and state militia units mostly fought the Spanish–American War of 1898. This conflict demonstrated the need for more effective control over the department and its bureaus.

Secretary of War Elihu Root (1899–1904) sought to appoint a chief of staff as general manager and a European-type general staff for planning, aiming to achieve this goal in a businesslike manner, but General Nelson A. Miles stymied his efforts. Root enlarged the United States Military Academy at West Point, New York and established the United States Army War College and the General Staff. He changed the procedures for promotions and organized schools for the special branches of the service. He also devised the principle of rotating officers from staff to line. Concerned about the new territories acquired after the Spanish–American War, Root worked out the procedures for turning Cuba over to the Cubans, wrote the charter of government for the Philippines, and eliminated tariffs on goods imported to the United States from Puerto Rico.

Root's successor as Secretary of War, William Howard Taft, returned to the traditional secretary-bureau chief alliance, subordinating the chief of staff to the adjutant general, a powerful office since its creation in 1775. Indeed, Secretary Taft exercised little power; President Theodore Roosevelt made the major decisions. In 1911, Secretary Henry L. Stimson and Major General Leonard Wood, his chief of staff, revived the Root reforms. The general staff assisted them in their efforts to rationalize the organization of the army along modern lines and in supervising the bureaus.

=== World War I ===
The Congress reversed these changes in support of the bureaus and in the National Defense Act of 1916 reduced the size and functions of the general staff to few members before America entered World War I on April 6, 1917. President Woodrow Wilson supported Secretary of War Newton D. Baker, who opposed efforts to control the bureaus and war industry until competition for limited supplies almost paralyzed industry and transportation, especially in the North. Yielding to pressure from Congress and industry, Secretary Baker placed Benedict Crowell in charge of munitions and made Major General George W. Goethals acting quartermaster general and General Peyton C. March chief of staff. Assisted by industrial advisers, they reorganized the supply system of the army and practically wiped out the bureaus as quasi-independent agencies. General March reorganized the general staff along similar lines and gave it direct authority over departmental operations. After the war, the Congress again granted the bureaus their former independence. The Commission on Training Camp Activities addressed moral standards of the troops.

In the 1920s, General John J. Pershing realigned the general staff on the pattern of his American Expeditionary Force (AEF) field headquarters, which he commanded. The general staff in the early 1920s exercised little effective control over the bureaus, but the chiefs of staff gradually gained substantial authority over them by 1939, when General George C. Marshall assumed the office of Army chief of staff.

=== World War II ===
During World War II, General Marshall principally advised President Franklin D. Roosevelt on military strategy and expended little effort in acting as general manager of the Department of War. Many agencies still fragmented authority, burdening the chief of staff with too many details, making the whole Department of War poorly geared toward directing the army in a global war. General Marshall described the chief of staff then as a "poor command post." President Roosevelt brought in Henry L. Stimson as Secretary of War; after the Japanese attack on Pearl Harbor, Stimson supported Marshall in reorganizing the army under the War Powers Act of 1941. He divided the Army of the United States (AUS) into three autonomous components to conduct the operations of the War Department: the Army Ground Forces (AGF) trained land troops; the U.S. Army Air Forces (USAAF) developed an independent air arm; and the Services of Supply (later Army Service Forces) directed administrative and logistical operations. The Operations Division acted as general planning staff for Marshall. By 1942, the Army Air Forces gained virtual independence in every way from the rest of the army.

=== Postwar ===
After World War II, the Department of War abandoned Marshall's organization for the fragmented prewar pattern while the independent services continually parried efforts to reestablish firm executive control over their operations. The National Security Act of 1947 split the War Department into the Department of the Army and the Department of the Air Force, and the secretary of the Army and secretary of the Air Force served as operating managers for the new secretary of defense.

== Office space ==
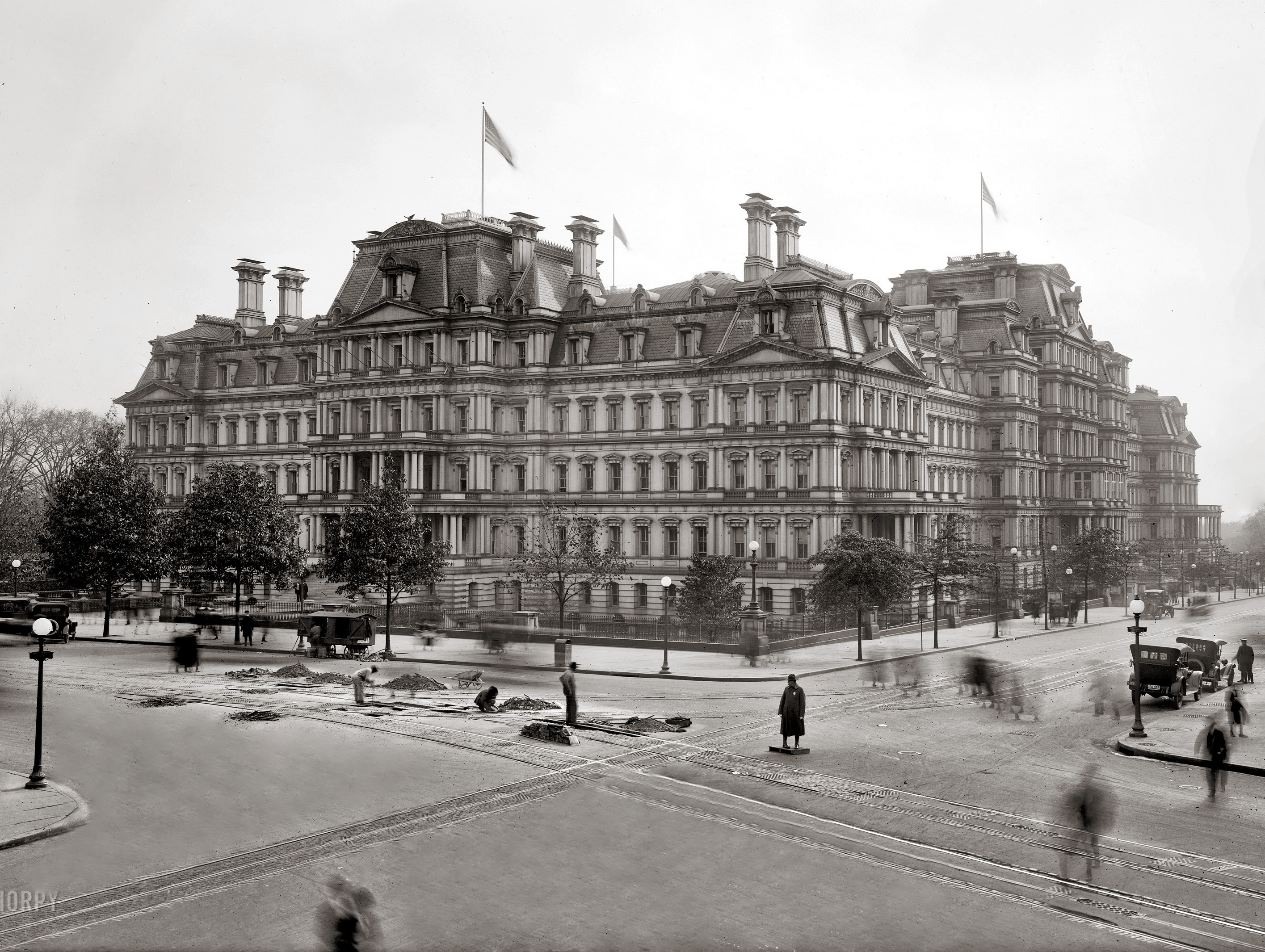
The State, War, and Navy Building in 1917

In the early years, between 1797 and 1800, the Department of war was headquartered in Philadelphia; it moved with the other federal agencies to the new national capital at Washington, D.C., in 1800. In 1820, headquarters moved into a building at 17th Street and Pennsylvania Avenue NW, adjacent to the Executive Mansion, part of a complex of four matching brick Georgian/Federal style buildings for Cabinet departments with War in the northwest, Navy in the southwest and to the other side: State to the northeast and Treasury in the southeast. The War Department building was supplemented in the 1850s by a building across the street to the west known as the Annex and became very important during the Civil War with President Abraham Lincoln visiting the War Office's telegraph room for constant updates and reports and walking back and forth to the "Residence". The original 1820 structures for War and Navy on the west side of the White House was replaced in 1888 by construction of a new building of French Empire design with mansard roofs, the "State, War, and Navy Building" (now the Old Executive Office Building, and later renamed to honor General and President Dwight D. Eisenhower), built in the same location as its predecessors.

By the 1930s, the Department of State squeezed the War Department from its office space, and the White House also desired additional office space. In August 1939, Secretary of War Harry H. Woodring and Acting Chief of Staff of the Army George C. Marshall moved their offices into the Munitions Building, a temporary structure built on the National Mall during World War I. In the late 1930s, the government constructed the War Department Building (renamed in 2000 as the Harry S Truman Building) at 21st and C Streets in Foggy Bottom, but upon completion, the new building did not solve the space problem of the department, and the Department of State ultimately used it.

Coming into office with World War II raging in Europe and Asia, Secretary of War Henry L. Stimson faced with the situation of the War Department spread through the overcrowded Munitions Building and numerous other buildings across Washington, D.C., and suburban Maryland and Virginia. On July 28, 1941, Congress authorized funding for a new Department of War building in Arlington, Virginia, which would house the entire department under one roof. When construction of the Pentagon was completed in 1943, the secretary of war vacated the Munitions Building and the department began moving into the Pentagon.

== Organization ==
The secretary of war, a member of the United States Cabinet, headed the War Department.

The National Security Act of 1947 established the National Military Establishment, later renamed the United States Department of Defense. On the same day this act was signed, Executive Order 9877 assigned primary military functions and responsibilities, with the former War Department split between the Department of the Army and Department of the Air Force.

In the aftermath of World War II, the American government (among others around the world) decided to abandon the word 'War' when referring to the civilian leadership of their military. One vestige of the former nomenclature is the names of the service war colleges: the Army War College, the Naval War College, and the Air War College, which still train U.S. military officers in tactics, operations and strategies.

== Seal of the department ==
The date "MDCCLXXVIII" and the designation "War Office" are indicative of the origin of the seal. The date (1778) refers to the year of its adoption. The term "War Office" used during the Revolution, and for many years afterward, was associated with the Headquarters of the Army.

== See also ==
- Military history of the United States
- United States Assistant Secretary of War

== Bibliography ==
- Cline, Ray S. Washington Command Post: The Operations Division, United States Army in World War II. (1950)
- Coffman, Edward M. The Regulars: The American Army, 1898–1941 (2007) excerpt and text search
- Coffman, Edward M. The hilt of the sword: the career of Peyton C. March (1966), on World War I
- Hewes, James E. From Root to McNamara: Army Organization and Administration, 1900–1963. (1975)
- Grossman, Mark, ed. Encyclopedia of the United States Cabinet: 1789-2010 (Grey House, 2010) in-depth history of the department and its leaders. online
- Koistinen, Paul A. C. Beating Plowshares into Swords: The Political Economy of American Warfare, 1606–1865 (1996) excerpt and text search
- Koistinen, Paul A. C. Mobilizing for modern war: the political economy of American warfare, 1865–1919 (1997)
- Koistinen, Paul A. C. Planning War, Pursuing Peace: The Political Economy of American Warfare, 1920–1939 (1998) excerpt and text search
- Koistinen, Paul A. C. Arsenal of World War II: the political economy of American warfare, 1940–1945 (2004)
- Pogue, Forrest C. George C. Marshall, Volume 2: Ordeal and hope, 1939–1942 (1967)
- Pogue, Forrest C. George C. Marshall, organizer of victory, 1943–1945 (1973)
- Shannon, Fred. The Organization and Administration of the Union Army 1861–1865 (2 vol 1928) vol 1 excerpt and text search; vol 2 excerpt and text search
- Short, Lloyd Milton (2007) [1923]. The Development of National Administrative Organization in the United States, Issue 10. Baltimore, Md.: Johns Hopkins Press. ISBN 0598686584. OCLC 60737965.
- White, Leonard D. The Federalists: a Study in Administrative History, (1948).
- White, Leonard D. The Jeffersonians: A Study in Administrative History, 1801–1829 (1965)
- White, Leonard D. The Jacksonians: A Study in Administrative History, 1829–1861. (1965)
- White, Leonard D. The Republican Era, 1869–1901 a Study in Administrative History, (1958)
- Wilson, Mark R. The Business of Civil War: Military Mobilization and the State, 1861–1865 (2006) excerpt and text search
