= Christ Episcopal Church (Duanesburg, New York) =

Historic church in New York, United States

- U.S. National Register of Historic Places
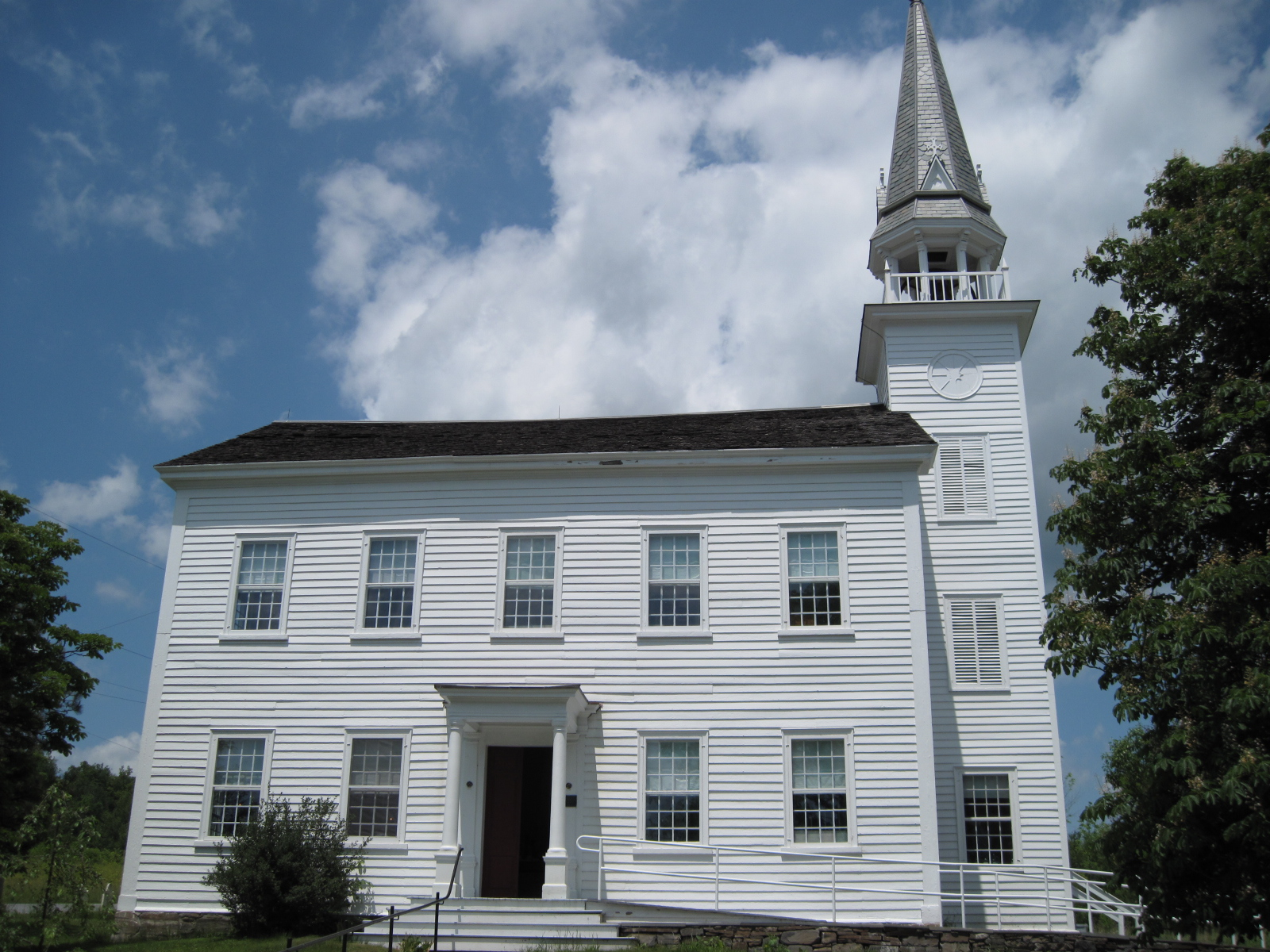
- Christ Episcopal Church, June 2009

- Location within New York Location within the United States
- Location: NY 20, Duanesburg, New York
- Coordinates: 42°46′7″N 74°9′17″W
- Area: 4.9 acres (2.0 ha)
- Built: 1793
- MPS: Duanesburg MRA
- NRHP reference No.: 87000911
- Added to NRHP: April 24, 1987

Christ Episcopal Church is a historic Episcopal church on NY 20 in Duanesburg, Schenectady County, New York. It was built in 1793 and is a two-story, rectangular meeting house with a freestanding tower. The square tower with octagonal spire was erected in 1811. Also on the property is a contributing carriage shed and cemetery. General William North (1755–1836), who owned the nearby North Mansion and Tenant House, is buried in the crypt. The church possesses a historic pipe organ, c. 1848, by Augustus Backus of Troy, New York.

The property was covered in a 1984 study of Duanesburg historical resources. It was listed on the National Register of Historic Places in 1987.

== Gallery ==
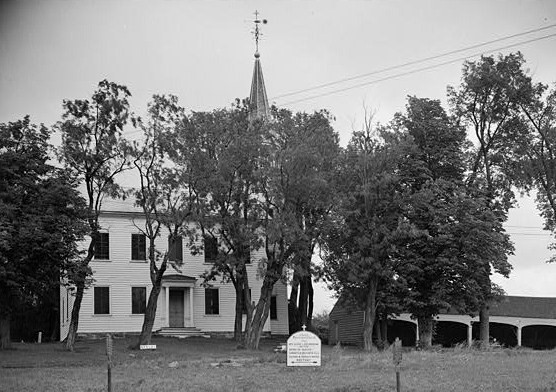
Christ Episcopal Church, HABS photograph
