= James Emott =

American politician

Member of the U.S. House of Representatives from New York's 4th district
- In office March 4, 1809 – March 3, 1813
- Preceded by: Philip Van Cortlandt
- Succeeded by: Thomas J. Oakley

Speaker of the New York State Assembly
- In office 1814–1814
- Preceded by: Jacob R. Van Rensselaer
- Succeeded by: Samuel Young

Personal details
- Born: March 9, 1771 Poughkeepsie, Province of New York, British America
- Died: April 7, 1850 (aged 79) Poughkeepsie, New York, U.S.
- Resting place: Poughkeepsie Rural Cemetery
- Party: Federalist
- Occupation: Lawyer

James Emott (March 9, 1771 – April 7, 1850) was an American lawyer and politician from New York.

== Life ==
He studied law, was admitted to the bar in 1790, and commenced practice in Ballston Center. He was land commissioner to settle disputes of titles to military reservations in Onondaga County, New York in 1797, and in 1800 removed to Albany, New York.

He was elected as a Federalist to the 11th and 12th United States Congresses, holding office from March 4, 1809, to March 3, 1813.

Emott was a member from Dutchess County of the New York State Assembly from 1814 to 1817, and was Speaker in 1814. In 1815, he was the Federalist candidate for U.S. Senator from New York but was defeated by Nathan Sanford.

He was First Judge of the Dutchess County Court from 1817 to 1823, and Judge of the Second Circuit Court from 1827 to 1831.

He was buried at the Poughkeepsie Rural Cemetery.

=== Electoral history ===
New York's 4th congressional district election, 1808
Party	Candidate	Votes	%
Federalist	James Emott	1,606	74.28
Democratic-Republican	Robert Johnston	556	25.72
Total votes		2,162	100.00
Federalist gain from Democratic-Republican			

New York's 4th congressional district election, 1810
Party	Candidate	Votes	%
Federalist	James Emott (incumbent)	3,125	51.07
Democratic-Republican	Daniel C. Verplanck	2,994	48.93
Total votes		6,119	100.00
Federalist hold			

1815 U.S. Senate election in New York
Party	Candidate	Votes	%
Democratic-Republican	Nathan Sanford	89	68.46
Federalist	James Emott	40	30.77
Democratic-Republican	Philetus Swift	1	0.77
Total votes		130	100.00
Democratic-Republican hold			
