= 1813 United States Senate election in New York =

The 1813 United States Senate election in New York was held on February 2, 1813, by the New York State Legislature to elect a U.S. senator (Class 3) to represent the State of New York in the United States Senate.

== Background ==
John Smith had been re-elected in 1807 to this seat, and his term would expire on March 3, 1813.

At the State election in April 1812, a Federalist majority was elected to the Assembly, but five of the eight State Senators up for renewal were Democratic-Republicans. Due to the public indignation after the prorogation of the State Legislature by Governor Daniel D. Tompkins, the Federalists managed to overturn the Democratic-Republican majority of the sitting legislature. The 36th New York State Legislature met from November 3 to 11, 1812; and from January 12 to April 13, 1813, at Albany, New York. The party strength in the Assembly as shown by the vote for Speaker was: 58 for Jacob R. Van Rensselaer and 46 for William Ross. The Democratic-Republican Party was split into two factions: the "Clintonians" (allies of Lieutenant Governor DeWitt Clinton), and the "Madisonians" (adversaries of Clinton who preferred the re-election of President James Madison). The November meeting of the State Legislature was held to choose presidential electors, and showed in the Senate 19 Clintonians, 9 Federalists and 4 Madisonians; and in the Assembly 58 Federalists, 29 Clintonians and 22 Madisonians, a Democratic-Republican majority of 7 votes on the joint ballot. The Federalists nominated their ticket of electors in the Assembly, and the Clintonians nominated their ticket in the Senate. On a joint ballot, the Clintonian electors were chosen by a vote of 74 to 45, with 28 blank votes. Thus DeWitt Clinton received the electoral vote of New York supported by the Clintonians and roughly one-third of the Federalists, with the Madisonians abstaining. However, for the election of a U.S. Senator at the regular meeting in February, 1813, both factions united to support Wilkin, but were surprisingly outvoted by the Federalists on a joint ballot.

== Candidates ==
Ex-U.S. Senator Rufus King (in office 1789–1796) was the candidate of the Federalist Party.

State Senator James W. Wilkin, a Clintonian, was the candidate of the Democratic-Republican Party.

The incumbent U.S. Senator John Smith received three scattering votes.

== Result ==
Rufus King was nominated by the Assembly, James W. Wilkin by the Senate. The houses of the State Legislature then proceeded to a joint ballot and King was elected with a small majority. In theory, the Democratic-Republicans had a majority of 7 votes on the joint ballot, but the absence of 4 senators and 8 assemblymen became significant. In 1817, Wilkin stated, in a letter to DeWitt Clinton, his belief that his defeat in 1813 was due to a bargain which connected the Federalists vote for the incorporation of the Bank of America in June 1812 to the help by some interested Democratic-Republicans to elect the next U.S. Senator. (see Hammond, pg. 344)

1813 United States Senator election result
Office	House	Federalist		Democratic-Republican		Democratic-Republican	
U.S. Senator	State Senate (32 members)	Rufus King	8	James W. Wilkin	17	John Smith	3
	State Assembly (109 members)	Rufus King	55	James W. Wilkin	44		
	Joint ballot (141 members)	Rufus King	68	James W. Wilkin	61		

Obs.: Three blank votes were cast in the joint ballot, and four Senators were absent. Besides, the numbers of the cast votes indicate that 10 assemblymen did not vote in the Assembly, and 5 in the joint ballot.

== See also ==
- 1812 United States presidential election

== Sources ==
- The New York Civil List compiled in 1858 (see: pg. 63 for U.S. Senators; pg. 121 for State Senators 1812–13; pg. 186f for Members of Assembly 1812–13)
- Members of the 13th United States Congress
- History of Political Parties in the State of New-York by Jabez Delano Hammond (pages 343f)
- Election result at the Tufts University Library project "A New Nation Votes"
