= James Tylee =

American politician (1750–1826)

James Tylee (1750–1826 New York City) was an American politician from New York.

== Biography ==
In 1795, Tylee was appointed as an inspector of sole leather. In 1786, he was a member of Engine No. 1 of the New York City Fire Department. In 1791, he was elected as a brother of the Council of Sachems of the Tammany Society. In 1792, he was an assessor of the fifth ward. In 1798, he served as president of the General Society of Mechanics and Tradesmen in New York City.

Tylee was a Federalist member of the New York State Assembly, representing New York City, in 1797. He served again in 1812.
