= William North =

American soldier and politician

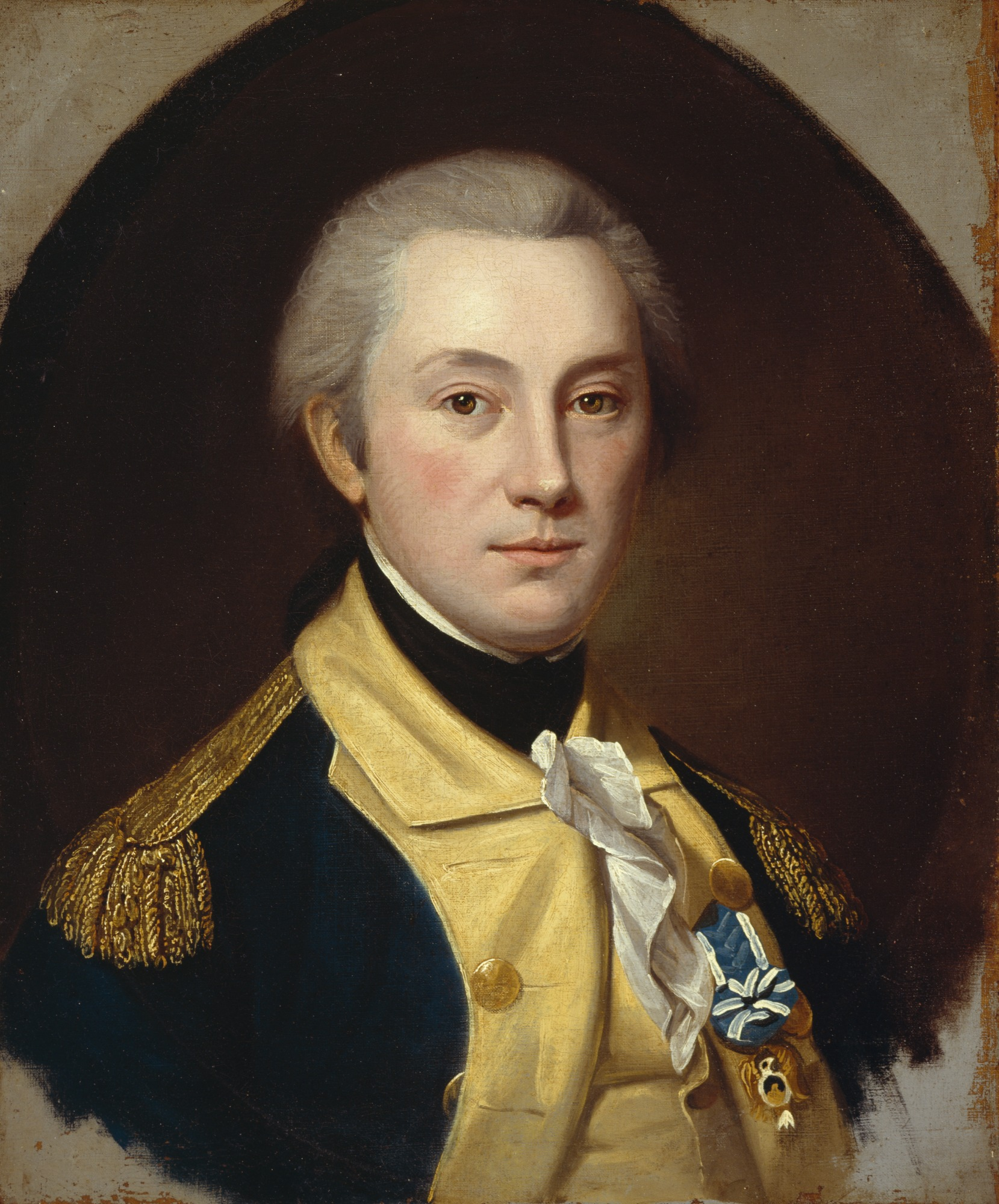
- Portrait by Charles Willson Peale, 1785

United States Senator from New York
- In office May 5, 1798 – August 17, 1798
- Appointed by: John Jay
- Preceded by: John Sloss Hobart
- Succeeded by: James Watson

Personal details
- Born: 1755 Pemaquid, Province of Maine
- Died: January 3, 1836 (aged 80–81) New York City
- Party: Federalist
- Spouse: Mary Duane (m. 1787)
- Relations: James Duane (father-in-law); Friedrich Wilhelm von Steuben (adopted father); George William Featherstonhaugh (brother-in-law); Mary Catharine North Weston (granddaughter)
- Children: 6
- Profession: Soldier, Statesman

William North (1755 – January 3, 1836) was an American soldier and politician. He was a soldier in the Continental Army during the American Revolutionary War, and later served as a member of the New York State Assembly.

== Early life ==
William North was born in Pemaquid, Maine, to John North and Elizabeth Pitson in 1755. John was an Irish immigrant and Elizabeth a native of Boston. He had two half-siblings from his father's previous marriage to Elizabeth Lewis, Joseph and Mary North.

His father, Captain John North, was Lieutenant Commander of Fort Frederick between 1744 and 1756, and in charge of Fort St. George from 1756 to 1763. He was also appointed Judge of the Court of Common Pleas for the county in 1760.

After the death of his father in 1763, North moved with his mother to Boston, Massachusetts. There he attended the Boston Latin School between 1764 and 1770. While in Boston, North worked in a Merchant's office, where he remained until the port was closed by British authorities in the fall of 1774.

== Career ==
=== Military career ===
He entered the Continental Army in 1775 and served under Benedict Arnold in the unfortunate expedition to Canada in that year. Though he volunteered, he was apparently too sick to participate. On May 9, 1776, he was commissioned second lieutenant in Captain John Gill's company of Colonel Thomas Craft's regiment of train artillery. He was then appointed in May 1777 as captain in Colonel Henry Jackson's 16th Massachusetts Regiment, with which he participated in the Battle of Monmouth. According to his son, the commission "went with my father in his bosom through the War of the Revolution".

In 1778 he met Baron Steuben, and the following year was appointed his aide-de-camp, and greatly assisted him introducing his system of discipline in the Continental Army. Later he accompanied Steuben to Virginia, and was present at the surrender of Cornwallis and the siege of Yorktown. Based on the Baron's recommendation, North was appointed as Inspector of the Troops under General Henry Knox in 1784.

North was appointed by Act of Congress a Major in the 2nd United States Regiment on October 20, 1786. This regiment was added to the army temporarily in response to Daniel Shays' uprising of debtor farmers in Massachusetts.

After the war he settled in Duanesburg, New York, where he married.

He was appointed adjutant general of the United States Army with the rank of brigadier general on July 19, 1798. In March of 1799, after eight months of inactive duty, Congress added the role of assistant inspector general to the position. As inspector general, Alexander Hamilton, who had worked closely with North during the Revolutionary War, subsequently requested him to serve as his chief of staff. There he assisted in Hamilton's attempt at reforming and strengthening the army. North began a revision of the army's general regulations in the winter of 1799–1800 before Congress abolished his and other staff appointments as tensions with France diminished in May. He was discharged in June.

In March 1812, he was again appointed adjutant-general of the Army, but declined. He may have declined due to his party's opposition to the war, which was especially strong in his home state of New York.

George Washington included North "among the most intelligent and active Officers of the late American Army" in a letter suggesting men for military appointment.

Caesar Russell, an African American Private in the 4th Massachusetts Regiment, served as North's personal servant while aide-de-camp to Baron Steuben.

==== Relationship with Baron Steuben ====
North and a fellow aide-de-camp, Captain Benjamin Walker, were formally adopted by Steuben and made his heirs. Some historians believe that these 'extraordinary intense emotional relationships' were romantic, and given Steuben's reported earlier behavior, it has been suggested it would have been out-of-character for him if they were not. However, based on the limited historical record, it is impossible to prove. Following Baron Steuben's death, North divided the property bequeathed to him among his military companions.

North named two of his six children after the Baron, Frederic William Steuben North and William Augustus Steuben North.

=== Political office ===
He was a member of the New York State Assembly from Albany County in 1792, 1794 and 1795, from Albany and Schenectady Counties in 1796, and from Schenectady County in 1810. He was Speaker in 1795, 1796 and 1810. North was appointed as a Federalist to the United States Senate to fill the vacancy caused by the resignation of John Sloss Hobart and served from May 5, 1798, to August 17, 1798, when James Watson was elected and qualified to succeed.

As a strong Federalist, North supported the Aliens and Sedition Acts and other efforts against the Democratic-Republican opposition. Additionally, he supported the establishment of a Provisional army, following the outbreak of the Quasi-war with France.

He was a member of the first Erie Canal Commission, from 1810 to 1816.

North was a commissioner and director of the Great Western Turnpike Company which was established by the New York state legislature March 15, 1799. It was commissioned to build a road from Albany to Cherry Valley.

== Personal life ==
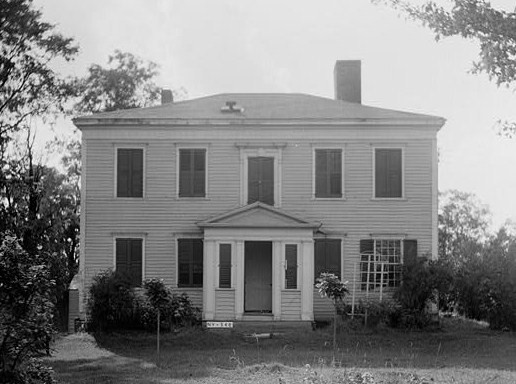
Gen. William North's house in Duanesburg, built c. 1795

On October 14, 1787, North married Mary Duane (b. 1762), the daughter of James Duane (1733–1797), the 44th Mayor of New York City and U.S. District Judge for the District of New York, appointed by George Washington. Together, they had six children, Frederic William Steuben (1788–1789), Marie (1780–1812), James Duane (1791–1792), Elizabeth (1792–1845), William Augustus Steuben (1793–1845), Adelia (1797–1878). Mary Catharine North Weston, a religious writer, was North's granddaughter through William Augustus Steuben.

It has been suggested that North and Benjamin Walker had a romantic relationship, but like with the Baron, this is difficult to be certain of. Nevertheless, and despite a falling out between 1811 and 1813, Walker remained North's most intimate friend until their deaths. Walker was named as a sponsor of North's daughter Adelia at her baptism.

The General William North House was listed on the National Register of Historic Places in 1987.

General North was an original member of the Society of the Cincinnati. He died in New York City, and was buried in the crypt under the Christ Episcopal Church in Duanesburg.

Political offices
Preceded by James Watson	Speaker of the New York State Assembly; 1795–1796	Succeeded by Gulian Verplanck
Preceded by James W. Wilkin	Speaker of the New York State Assembly; 1810	Succeeded by Nathan Sanford
U.S. Senate
Preceded by John Sloss Hobart	U.S. senator (Class 1) from New York; 1798; Served alongside: John Laurance	Succeeded by James Watson
Military offices
Preceded by Edward Hand	Adjutant General of the U.S. Army; November 5, 1783 – October 28, 1787	Succeeded by Ebenezer Denny (acting)
Preceded by Friedrich Wilhelm von Steuben	Inspectors General of the U.S. Army; April 17, 1784 – October 28, 1787	Succeeded by vacant
Preceded by Thomas H. Cushing (acting)	Adjutant General of the U.S. Army; July 19, 1798 – June 15, 1800	Succeeded by Thomas H. Cushing
