= Mary Catharine North Weston =

American religious writer

- Born: April 14, 1822; Albany
- Died: August 4, 1882 (aged 60); Greenwich
- Occupation: Writer
- Spouse(s): Daniel Cony Weston
- Parent(s): William Augustus Stuben North

Mary Catharine North Weston (April 14, 1822 – August 4, 1882) was an American religious writer.

Mary Catharine North was born on April 14, 1822 in Albany, New York, the daughter of William Augustus Stuben North, son of William North, and Margaret Bridge North. She married the Rev. Daniel Cony Weston, son of Nathan Weston, in 1842 and they had six children.

Weston's works were published by the General Protestant Episcopal Sunday School Union and Church Book Society. Her first book, Calvary Catechism (1857), was popular, selling 600,000 copies a year. It was translated into German, Russian, and Dakota.

Mary Catharine North Weston died on 4 August 1882 in Greenwich, Connecticut.

== Bibliography ==
- Calvary Catechism, N. York, 1857, 32mo; 2d ed., 1859.
- Catechism on the Doctrines and Usages of the Protestant Episcopal Church, 1860, 18mo.
- Synopsis of the Bible, 1865, 16mo.
- Jewish Antiquities, 1866, 16mo
- Biography of Old Testament Characters, 1871
- Biography of New Testament Characters, 1871
- Old Testament Stories about Men and Women of the Bible. Illust. N York, 1882, sq 8vo
