= 1815 United States Senate election in New York =

- February 7, 1815
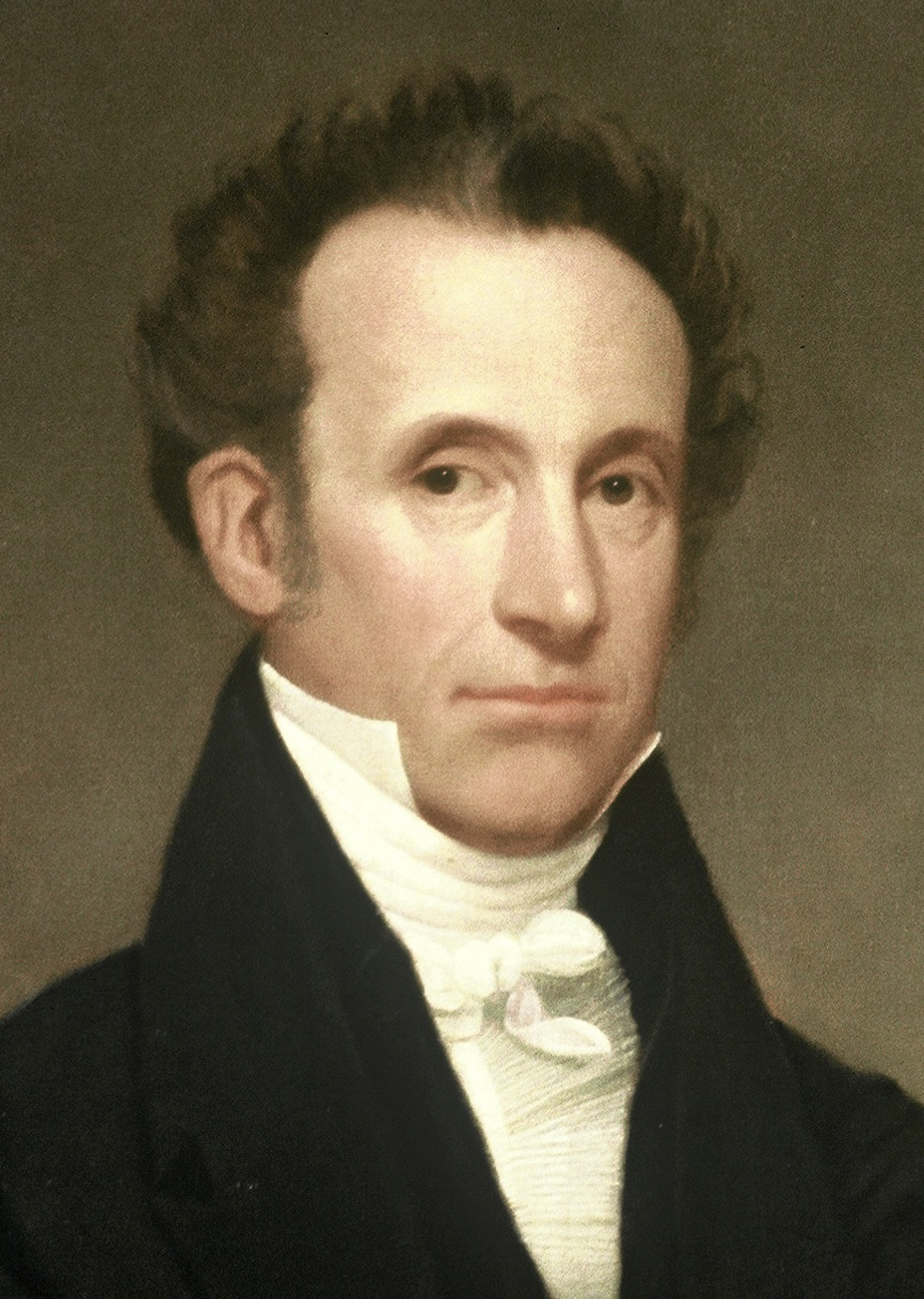

Nominee	Nathan Sanford	James Emott
Party	Democratic-Republican	Federalist
Electoral vote	89	40
Percentage	67.94%	30.53%
[[List of United States senators from {{{country}}}|U.S. senator]] before election
Obadiah German
Democratic-Republican
Elected U.S. Senator
Nathan Sanford
Democratic-Republican

The 1815 United States Senate election in New York was held on February 7, 1815, by the New York State Legislature to elect a U.S. senator (Class 1) to represent the State of New York in the United States Senate.

== Background ==
Obadiah German had been elected in 1809 to this seat, and his term would expire on March 3, 1815.

At the state election in April 1814, a Democratic-Republican majority was elected to the assembly, and eight of the nine state senators up for election were Democratic-Republicans. The 38th New York State Legislature met from September 26 to October 24, 1814; and from January 31 to April 18, 1815, at Albany, New York. The party strength in the assembly as shown by the vote for Speaker was: 61 for Samuel Young and 35 for James Emott.

== Candidates ==
State Senator Nathan Sanford was the candidate of the Democratic-Republican Party.

Assemblyman James Emott, the Speaker of the previous Assembly session, was the candidate of the Federalist Party.

State Senator Philetus Swift received a "complimentary vote" from Sanford, traditionally the candidates did not vote for themselves.

== Result ==
Nathan Sanford was the choice of both the Assembly and the Senate, and was declared elected.

1815 United States Senator election result
Office	House	Democratic-Republican		Federalist		Democratic-Republican	
U.S. Senator	State Senate (32 members)	Nathan Sanford	24	James Emott	6	Philetus Swift	1
	State Assembly (110 members)	Nathan Sanford	65	James Emott	34		

== Sources ==
- The New York Civil List compiled in 1858 (see: pg. 63 for U.S. Senators; pg. 122 for state senators 1814–15; pg. 189f for Members of Assembly 1814–15)
- Members of the 14th United States Congress
- History of Political Parties in the State of New-York by Jabez Delano Hammond (pages 393f)
- Election result (U.S. Senator) at Tufts University Library project "A New Nation Votes"
- Election result (Speaker) at Tufts University Library project "A New Nation Votes"

== See also ==
- United States Senate elections, 1814 and 1815
