= 1821 United States Senate election in New York =

- February 6, 1821

Majority vote of legislature needed to win
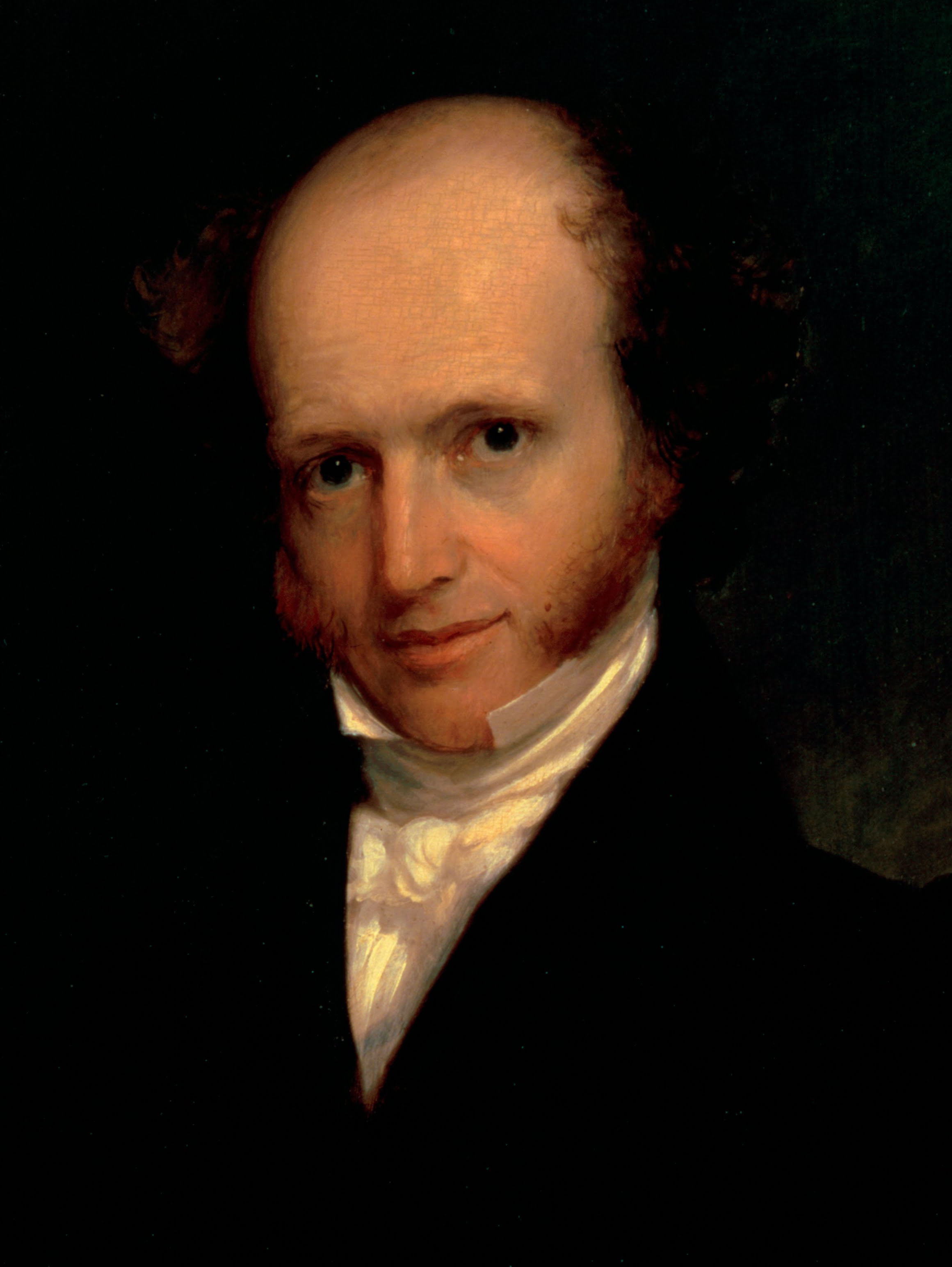

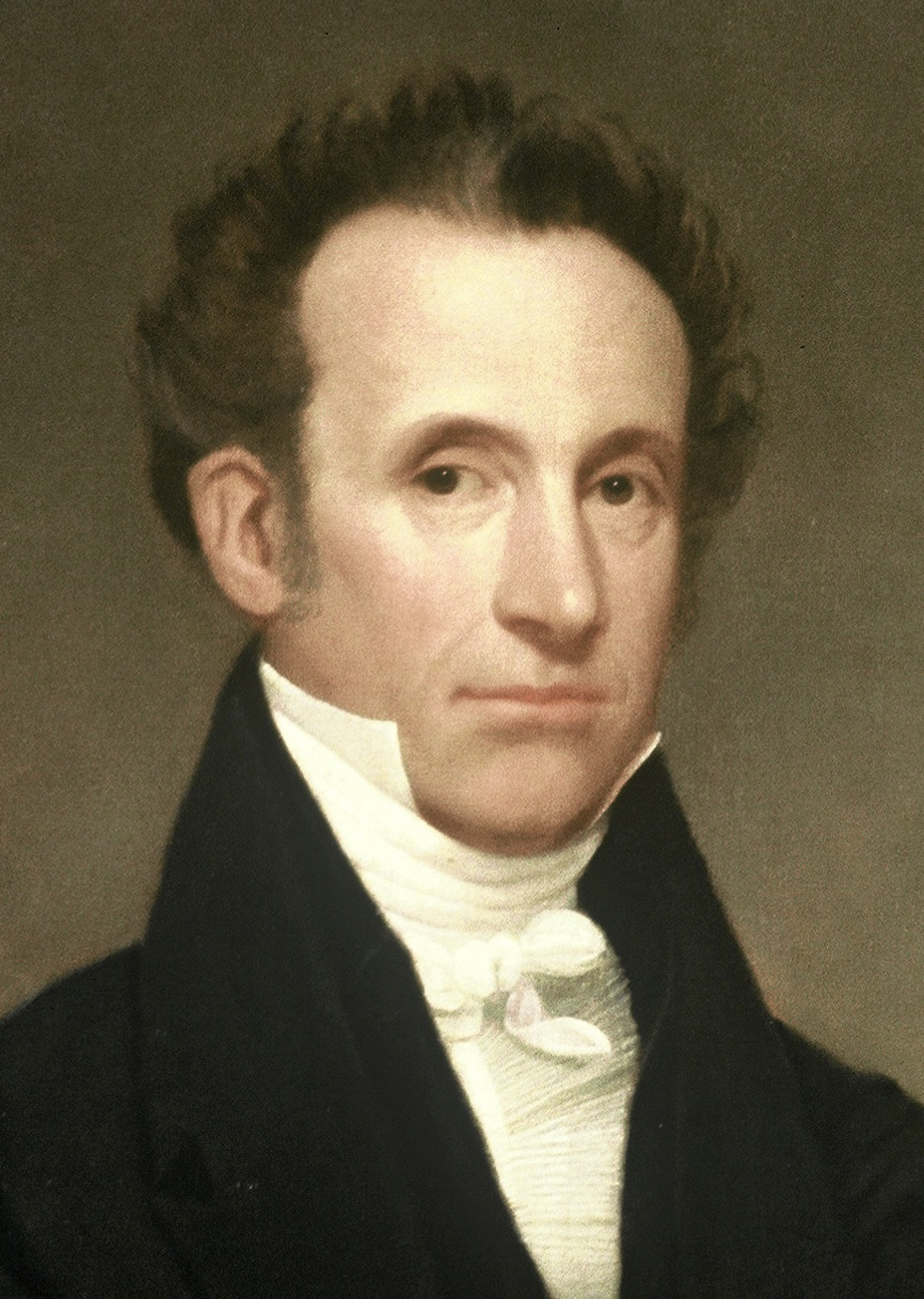
Nominee	Martin Van Buren	Nathan Sanford
Party	Democratic-Republican	Democratic-Republican
Alliance	Bucktails	DeWitt Clinton
Senate	17	8
Percentage	68%	32%
House	69	52
Percentage	57.02%	42.98%
Senator before election
Nathan Sanford
Democratic-Republican
Elected Senator
Martin Van Buren
Democratic-Republican

The 1821 United States Senate election in New York was held on February 6, 1821, by the New York State Legislature to elect a U.S. senator (Class 1) to represent the State of New York in the United States Senate.

== Background ==
Nathan Sanford had been elected in 1815 to this seat, and his term would expire on March 3, 1821.

Although nominally in the same party, the Democratic-Republicans were split into two fiercely opposing factions: the "Clintonians" (allies of Governor DeWitt Clinton), and "Bucktails" (a combine of the Tammany members from New York City and Clinton's upstate adversaries led by Martin Van Buren). The Federalist Party had disbanded, the larger part joining the Clintonians, the others the Bucktails. At the State election in April 1820, although Clinton was re-elected Governor, a Bucktails majority was elected to the assembly, and five of the eight state senators up for renewal were Bucktails. The 44th New York State Legislature met from November 7 to 20, 1820; and from January 9 to April 3, 1821, at Albany, New York. The party strength in the assembly as shown by the vote for Speaker was: 69 for Bucktail Peter Sharpe and 52 for Clintonian John C. Spencer.

== Candidates ==
Before the election, a caucus of Democratic-Republican State legislators was held with 82 members present. 58 voted for Van Buren, 24 for Sanford, and Martin Van Buren was declared nominated. In the election, he received the votes of the Bucktails.

Disregarding the caucus nominee, a practice now already established, the incumbent U.S. Senator Nathan Sanford received the votes of the Clintonians.

== Result ==
Martin Van Buren was the choice of both the Assembly and the Senate, and was declared elected.

1821 United States Senator election result
Office	House	Dem.-Rep./Bucktails		Dem.-Rep./Clintonian	
U.S. Senator	State Senate (32 members)	Martin Van Buren	17	Nathan Sanford	8
	State Assembly (126 members)	Martin Van Buren	69	Nathan Sanford	52

== Sources ==
- The New York Civil List compiled in 1858 (see: pg. 63 for U.S. Senators; pg. 124 for state senators 1820–21; pg. 196f for Members of Assembly 1820–21)
- Members of the 17th United States Congress
- History of Political Parties in the State of New-York, Vol. I by Jabez Delano Hammond (pages 561f) [gives Senate vote as 17 to 8, Hammond himself abstained]
- Election result (U.S. Senator) at Tufts University Library project "A New Nation Votes" [gives Senate vote as 19 to 11]
- Election result (Speaker) at Tufts University Library project "A New Nation Votes"
