= North Mansion and Tenant House =

Historic house in New York, United States

- U.S. National Register of Historic Places
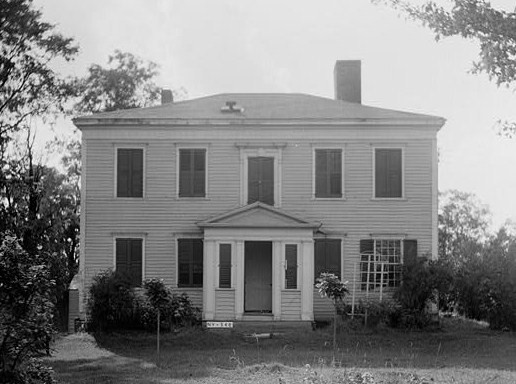
- General William North House, HABS photograph

- Location within New York Location within the United States
- Location: North Mansion Rd., Duanesburg, New York
- Coordinates: 42°45′13″N 74°6′52″W
- Area: 6 acres (2.4 ha)
- Built: c. 1795
- Architectural style: Georgian
- MPS: Duanesburg MRA
- NRHP reference No.: 87000909
- Added to NRHP: April 24, 1987

North Mansion and Tenant House, also known as the General William North House, is a historic home located at Duanesburg in Schenectady County, New York. The North Mansion was built about 1795 by General William North (1755–1836). It is a 2-story, five-bay, rectangular frame residence topped by a low-pitched hipped roof pierced by two large central chimneys. It is representative of the Georgian style. The main entrance is flanked by slender pilasters and a slightly projecting pediment. The tenant house was constructed in the 1780s and is a 1 1/2-story, altered saltbox-style residence. Also on the property is a contributing barn.

The property was covered in a 1984 study of Duanesburg historical resources. It was listed on the National Register of Historic Places in 1987.
