= Nathaniel Potter =

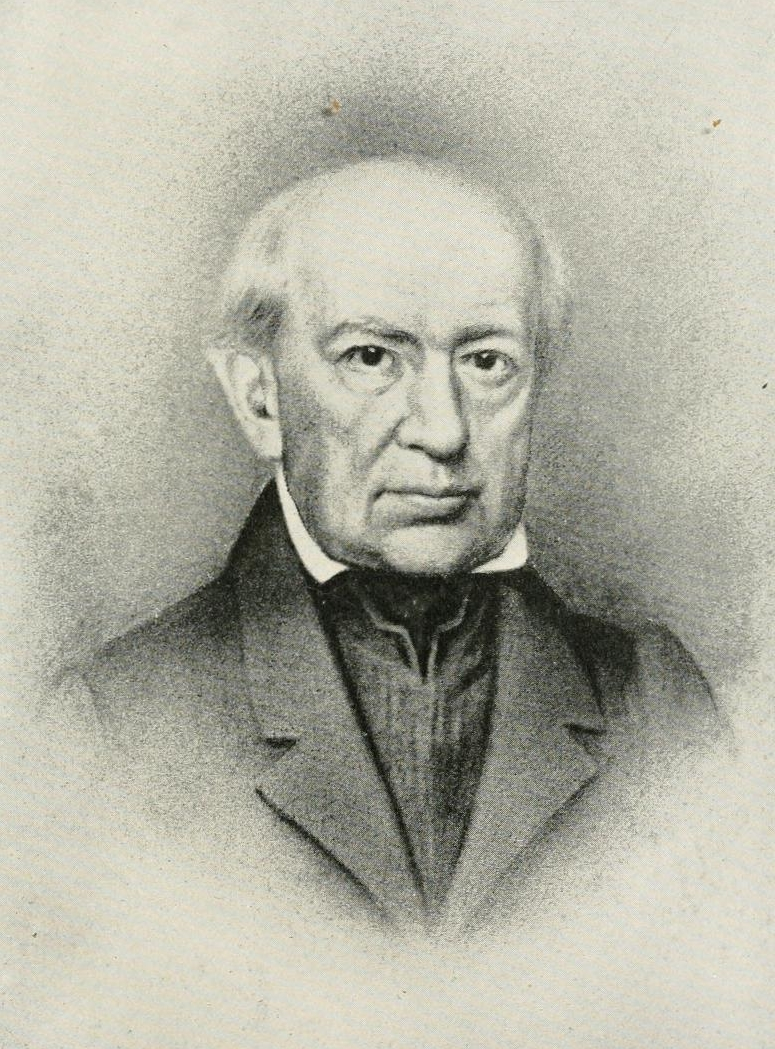
- Born: 1770; Easton, Maryland
- Died: 2 January 1843 (aged 72–73); Baltimore, Maryland, US
- Education: University of Pennsylvania
- Medical career
- Institutions: University of Maryland Medical School; Baltimore general dispensary
- Research: yellow fever and typhus entomology

Nathaniel Potter (1770 – 2 January 1843) was an American surgeon and founder of the college of medicine in Baltimore, Maryland, in 1807, which in 1812 became a part of the University of Maryland.

Potter was born in Easton, Talbot County, Maryland. His father Zabdiel Potter had served as a surgeon for the Revolutionary Army. He studied in New Jersey before studying medicine under Benjamin Rush at Philadelphia and at the University of Pennsylvania (graduated MD 1796 with a thesis on the effects of arsenic) and went to Baltimore to practice. He worked at the Baltimore general dispensary around 1802–3 and was a secretary of the medical and chirurgical faculty. In 1807 he was a founder of the college of medicine along with John B. Davidge. The college was merged into the University of Maryland in 1812 and he was made professor of the theory and practice of medicine. He also served as dean in 1814. He edited the Baltimore Medical and Philosophical Lyceum in 1811 and was an editor of the Maryland Medical and Surgical Journal . Apart from his medical studies including on yellow fever (which he showed was not directly contagious) and typhus, he also studied insects and wrote about periodical (17 year) cicadas. He married Catherine, daughter of Thomas Goldsborough and Catherine Fauntleroy in 1798. He married again but no children survived. He died from a severe bout of coughing. He was embroiled in a legal dispute with the state that took away his medical license. This strained him financially and was buried in an unmarked grave, but a headstone was added around 1993.
