= Provisional Army of the United States =

U.S. military force from 1798 to 1800

- Founded: May 1798
- Disbanded: Legally December 1798, Officially June 1800
- Country: United States
- Type: Army
- Size: 12 regiments of infantry 6 troops of cavalry Note: only 7 officers actually commissioned

Commanders
- Commander in Chief of all the Armies of the United States: George Washington
- Inspector general: Alexander Hamilton
- Adjutant general: William North
- Physician general: Dr. James Craik

The Provisional Army of the United States was a paper military force authorized, but not raised by the United States of America between May 1798 and December 1798. When Congress reconvened on December 3, 1798, authority of the President to raise the provisional army lapsed.

== History ==
The Provisional Army of the United States was created as an additional military establishment to exist simultaneously with the Regular Army, also known as the "Old Army", mainly because of political concerns about increasing the size of the latter force. Raised following the outbreak of an undeclared war between the United States and France, its term of enlistment, unlike that of the regular army, was only for the duration of the "existing differences between the United States and the French Republic".

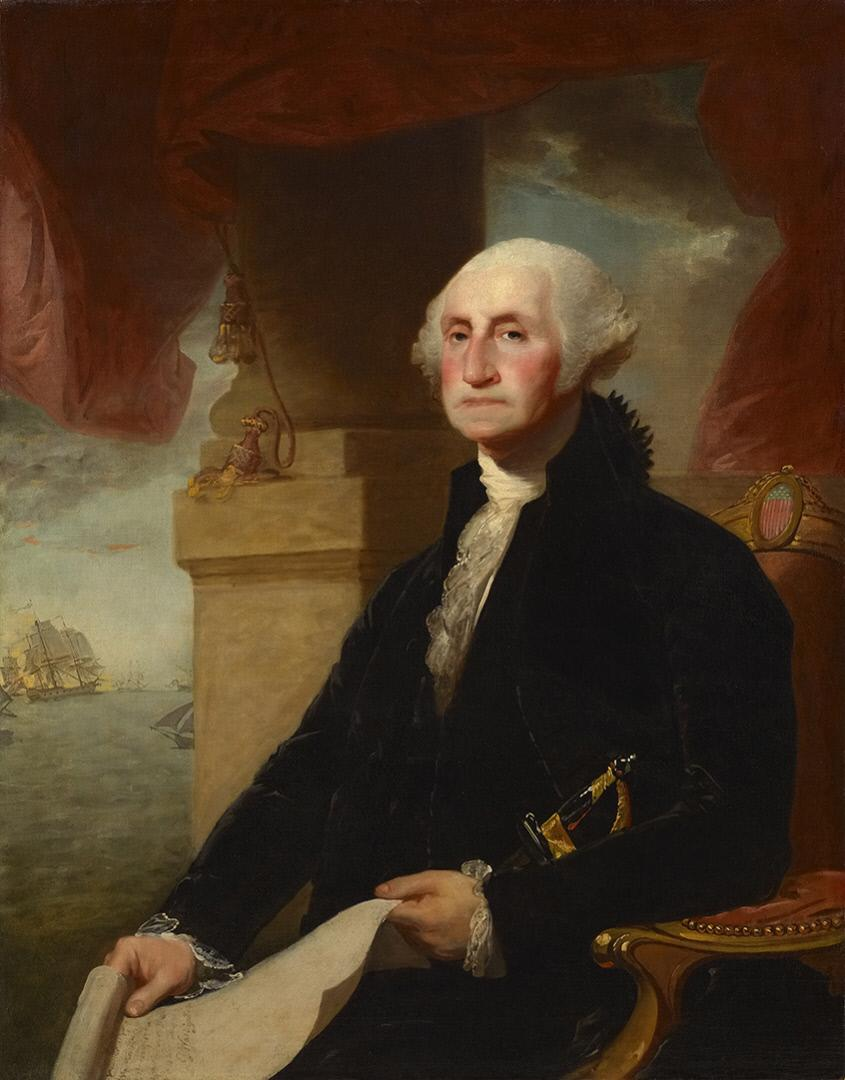
George Washington was the commanding general of the Provisional Army of the United States.

The Fifth Congress authorized US President John Adams to raise the Provisional Army between its 1798 summer recess and its reassembly the following winter. However, Adams had commissioned only seven officers before his authority to recruit personnel to the Provisional Army expired..

No meaningful recruiting had occurred and new legislation was enacted to create yet another army, the Eventual Army of the United States, to which all of the Provisional Army's empty regiments were transferred.. (Note: The Eventual Army of the United States itself existed simultaneously with the Additional Army of the United States, which, unlike the Provisional Army and the Eventual Army, was not separate from the United States Army but was an expansion of the regular forces with personnel recruited for limited duration. The confusing proliferation of "armies" resulted in their frequent misidentification, occasionally even by Hamilton himself.) No regiments were raised in the Eventual Army, however.

The Provisional Army of the United States was officially dissolved on June 15, 1800, when the few officers commissioned were mustered out, though the ability to raise regiments within the provisional army had expired almost a year and a half prior..

== Organization ==
The commanding officer of the Provisional Army was George Washington, who was commissioned at the rank of lieutenant general and to the post of "Commander in Chief of all the Armies of the United States," which gave him titular authority over both the Provisional Army of the United States and the United States Army. The aging Washington accepted the appointment conditional to his ability to remain in secluded retirement at Mount Vernon until he was actually needed. The Provisional Army's other officers included Major General Alexander Hamilton (Inspector General), Brigadier General William North (Adjutant General), and Dr. James Craik (Physician General).

On paper, the Provisional Army was organized into one cavalry regiment and twelve infantry regiments.

Of the three additional military establishments authorized by Congress during the Quasi War period, the only one that troops were actually raised in was the Additional Army of the United States. By the beginning of 1799 the officers had been appointed and in May 1799 recruiting began. By the time the Additional Army was disbanded in June 1800, about 4,100 men had been mobilized, assembled in camps, and given from six to twelve months' training. Hamilton directed the preparation of new drill regulations to replace Steuben's, but before the task was finished the French crisis had ended and the Additional Army was discharged.

The Mid Atlantic 12th, 13th and 14th Additional Army regiments were organized into the Union Brigade and encamped in huts they erected in Plainfield New Jersey in the fall of 1799 until the disbandment in June 1800. The New England regiments were similarly encamped in Massachusetts and the southern regiments at Harper's Ferry

== See also ==
- Army of the United States
