= Nathan Sanford =

American politician (1777–1838)

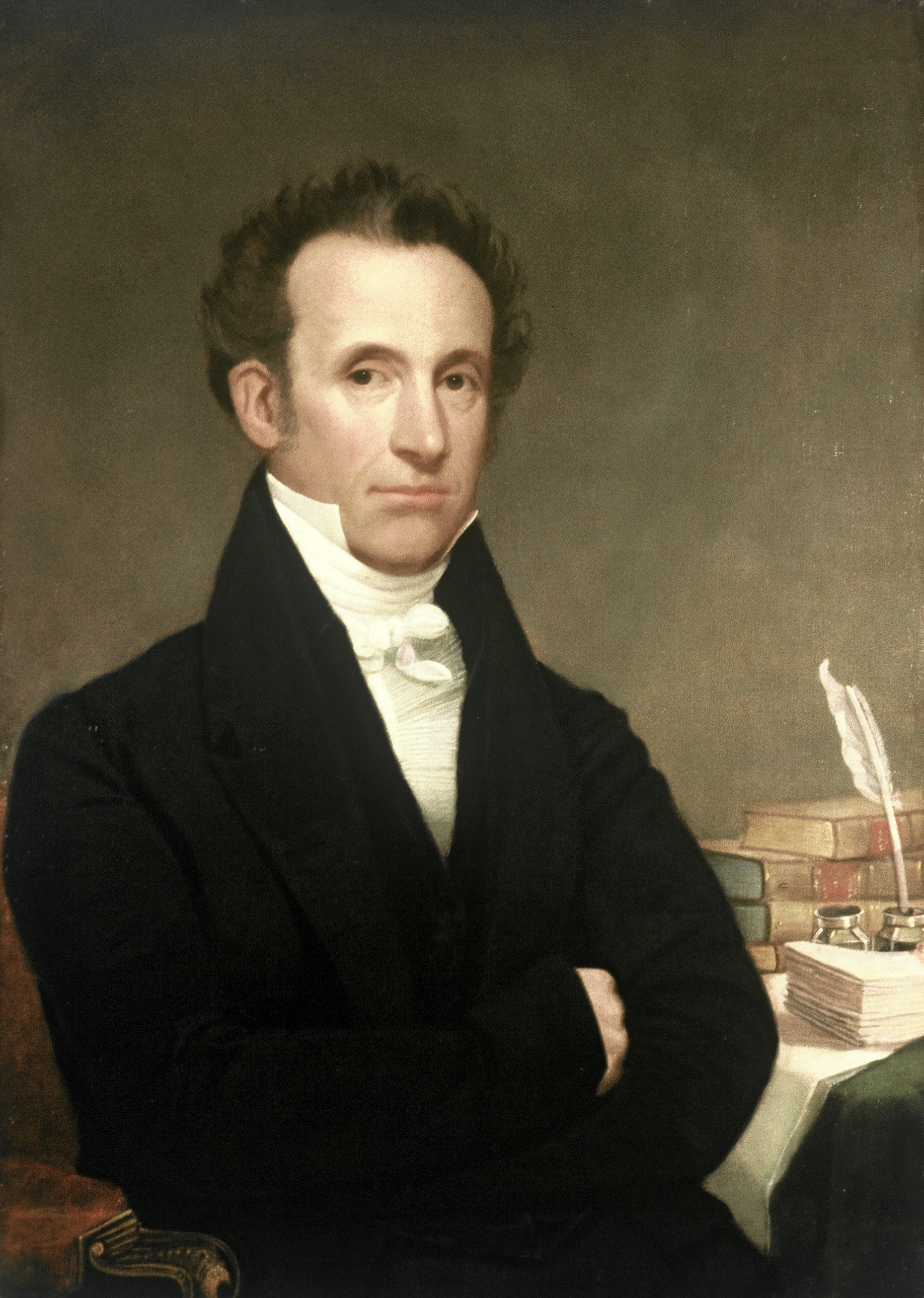

United States Senator from New York
- In office January 14, 1826 – March 3, 1831
- Preceded by: Rufus King
- Succeeded by: William L. Marcy
- In office March 4, 1815 – March 3, 1821
- Preceded by: Obadiah German
- Succeeded by: Martin Van Buren

Chancellor of New York
- In office 1823–1826
- Preceded by: James Kent
- Succeeded by: Samuel Jones

Personal details
- Born: November 5, 1777 Bridgehampton, New York, British America
- Died: October 17, 1838 (aged 60) Flushing, New York, U.S. (now New York City)
- Party: Democratic-Republican (Before 1825); National Republican (1825–1833)
- Spouses: Elizabeth Van Horn (died 1811) Mary Malbone Isaacs (m. 1813; died 1816) Mary Buchanan (m. 1828)
- Relations: Peter Gansevoort (son-in-law)
- Children: 7, including Edward
- Education: Yale University; Litchfield Law School

Nathan Sanford (November 5, 1777 – October 17, 1838) was an American politician.

== Early life ==
Sanford was born on November 5, 1777, in Bridgehampton, New York. He was the son of Thomas Sanford and Phebe (née Baker) Sanford, a family of farmers and tradesmen.

He attended Yale University, studied law, was admitted to the bar, and commenced practice in New York City.

== Career ==
In 1803, he was appointed as United States Attorney for the District of New York, and remained in office until 1815 when the district was split into the Northern and the Southern District of New York. He was also the appellate lawyer for Jesse Pierson in the landmark case of Pierson v. Post.

He was a member of the New York State Assembly in 1808-09 and 1811. In 1811, he was elected Speaker on January 29, but could not attend the session after February 10 because of ill health. The Assembly moved to elect a new Speaker and proceeded to the election of William Ross. He was a member of the New York State Senate (Southern D.) from 1812 to 1815, sitting in the 35th, 36th, 37th and 38th New York State Legislatures.

In 1815, he was elected as a Democratic-Republican to the United States Senate and served from March 4, 1815, to March 3, 1821. He was Chairman of the Committee on Commerce and Manufactures (15th and 16th United States Congresses), and a member of the Committee on Naval Affairs (15th Congress) and the Committee on Finance (16th Congress). In 1821, he ran for re-election as a Clintonian, but was defeated by Bucktail Martin Van Buren.

He was a delegate to the New York State Constitutional Convention of 1821, and was Chancellor of New York from 1823 to 1826. In 1824, he received 30 electoral votes for U.S. Vice President.

In 1826, he resigned the chancellorship after his nomination in caucus, and was elected again to the U.S. Senate. He took his seat on January 31, 1826, and served until March 3, 1831. He was Chairman of the Committee on Foreign Relations (19th United States Congress). In this stint in the Senate, he generally aligned himself with President John Quincy Adams and Secretary of State Henry Clay. Afterwards he resumed the practice of law in Flushing, New York.

== Personal life ==
Sanford was married three times. His first marriage was to Elizabeth "Eliza" Van Horn (1780–1811). His residence in Flushing, "Sanford Hall", became a private insane asylum in 1845, run by Dr. James Macdonald, MD and Gen. Allan Macdonald. Together, Nathan and Eliza were the parents of several children, including:

- Edward Sanford (1805–1876), a New York State Senator.
- Eliza Sanford, who married John Le Breton.
- Charles Sanford.
- Henry Sanford.

After his first wife's death in 1811, Sanford was remarried to Mary Esther Malbone Isaacs (1790–1816), the eldest daughter of Col. Ralph Isaacs and Elizabeth (née Sebor) Isaacs, in 1813. Together, they were the parents of two children:

- Mary Sanford (1814–1841), who married Peter Gansevoort (1788–1876), also a New York State Senator.
- Henry Sanford (1816–1832), who died young.

After his second wife's death, he remarried for a third time to Mary Buchanan (1800–1879), whom he married in May 1828. Together, they were the parents of:

- Robert Sanford (1831–1908), a Union College and New York Law School graduate.

He died in Flushing on October 17, 1838, and was buried at St. George's Episcopal Church Cemetery in Flushing.

Legal offices
Preceded by Edward Livingston	U.S. Attorney for the District of New York; 1803–1815	Succeeded by Roger Skinner as U.S. Attorney for the Northern District of New York
Preceded by Edward Livingston	U.S. Attorney for the District of New York; 1803–1815	Succeeded by Jonathan Fisk as U.S. Attorney for the Southern District of New York
Preceded by James Kent	Chancellor of New York; 1823–1826	Succeeded by Samuel Jones
Political offices
Preceded by William North	Speaker of the New York State Assembly; 1811	Succeeded by William Ross
U.S. Senate
Preceded by Obadiah German	United States Senator (Class 1) from New York; 1815–1821; Served alongside: Rufus King	Succeeded by Martin Van Buren
Preceded by William Hunter	Chair of the Senate Commerce Committee; 1817–1820	Succeeded by Mahlon Dickerson
Preceded by Charles Tait	Chair of the Senate Naval Affairs Committee; 1818–1819	Succeeded by James Pleasants
Preceded by John W. Eppes	Chair of the Senate Finance Committee; 1819–1821	Succeeded by John Holmes
Preceded by Rufus King	United States Senator (Class 3) from New York; 1826–1831; Served alongside: Martin Van Buren, Charles E. Dudley	Succeeded by William L. Marcy
Preceded by Nathaniel Macon	Chair of the Senate Foreign Relations Committee; 1826–1827	Succeeded by Nathaniel Macon
Party political offices
Preceded by Daniel D. Tompkins	Democratic-Republican nominee for Vice President of the United States¹; 1824; Served alongside: John C. Calhoun, Albert Gallatin (withdrew), Nathaniel Macon	Position abolished
Notes and references
1. The Democratic-Republican Party split in the 1824 election, fielding four separate candidates.
