= United States Attorney for the District of New York =

Federal office, 1789 to 1815

The U.S. Attorney for the District of New York was from 1789 to 1815 the chief federal law enforcement officer in the federal judicial District of New York, which at that time was coterminous with the whole State of New York. In 1814, the District of New York was split into the Northern and the Southern District, and in 1815 the first U.S. Attorneys were appointed for the new districts.

The U.S. District Court for the District of New York had jurisdiction over all cases prosecuted by the U.S. Attorney.

== List of U.S. attorneys for the District of New York ==
- Richard Harison: 1789–1801
- Edward Livingston: 1801–1803
- Nathan Sanford: 1803–1815

== Sources ==
- Political Graveyard
