= James W. Wilkin =

American politician (1762–1845)

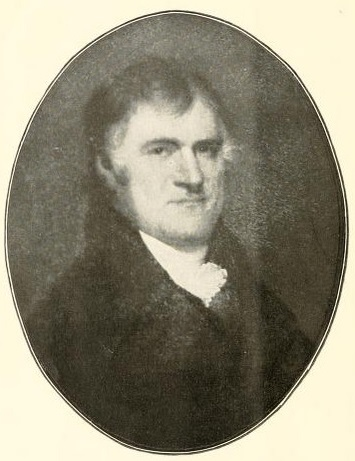
James W. Wilkin, New York military and political leader.

James Whitney Wilkin (March 19, 1762 – February 23, 1845) was an American lawyer and politician from New York.

== Life ==
Wilkin was born in Wallkill, New York (then in Orange County, but now in Ulster County). He served in the Revolutionary War.

He graduated from Princeton College in 1785. Then he studied law, and was admitted to the bar in 1788, and began practice in Goshen, New York. He was a member of the New York State Assembly in 1796, 1808 and 1808–09, and served as Speaker during the latter term. He entered the State militia and rose through successive grades to the rank of major general. He was a member of the New York State Senate from 1801 to 1804 and from 1811 to 1814. He was a member of the Council of Appointment in 1802, 1811, and 1813. He was an unsuccessful candidate for U.S. Senator from New York in 1813.

Wilkin was elected as a Democratic-Republican to the 14th United States Congress to fill the vacancy caused by the resignation of Jonathan Fisk. He took his seat on December 4, 1815. He was re-elected to the 15th United States Congress, and served until March 3, 1819. That year, his grandson, Alexander Wilkin, was born.

He was County Clerk of Orange County from 1819 to 1821, and County Treasurer for several years.

Wilkin died in Goshen, Orange County, New York. He was buried at Slate Hill Cemetery.

== Sources ==
- United States Congress. "James W. Wilkin (id: W000472)". Biographical Directory of the United States Congress.
- James Whitney Wilkin in Princetonians, 1784-1790: A Biographical Dictionary, by Ruth L. Woodward, Wesley Frank Craven

Political offices
Preceded by Alexander Sheldon	Speaker of the New York State Assembly; 1808–1809	Succeeded by William North
U.S. House of Representatives
Preceded by Jonathan Fisk	Member of the U.S. House of Representatives from New York's 6th congressional district 1815–1819	Succeeded by Walter Case
