= Samuel Jones (chancellor) =

American politician (1769-1853)

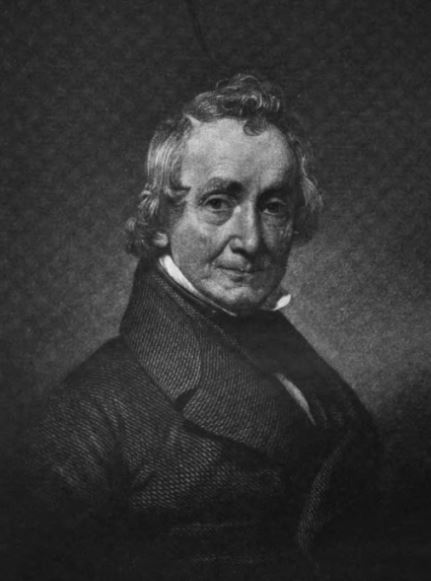

Chancellor of New York
- In office 1826–1828
- Preceded by: Nathan Sanford
- Succeeded by: Reuben H. Walworth

Recorder of New York City
- In office 1823–1824
- Preceded by: Richard Riker
- Succeeded by: Richard Riker

Member of the New York State Assembly
- In office 1812–1814

Personal details
- Born: May 26, 1769 New York City, Province of New York, British America
- Died: August 9, 1853 (aged 84) Cold Spring Harbor, New York, U.S.
- Parent(s): Samuel Jones; Cornelia Haring Jones
- Education: Yale University; Columbia University

Samuel Jones Jr. (May 26, 1769 – August 9, 1853) was an American lawyer and politician.

== Early life ==
Jones was born on May 26, 1769 in New York City, in the Province of New York, in what was then British America. He was the son of Cornelia (née Haring) Jones and Samuel Jones (1734–1819), who served as New York State Comptroller and Recorder of New York City. At his baptism, his sponsors were Cornelius Roosevelt and Elizabeth Haring, his maternal grandmother.

He graduated from Yale University in 1790 and Columbia University in 1793. He then studied law in his father's office, where DeWitt Clinton was also a student, and was admitted to the bar.

== Career ==
Jones was a member of the New York State Assembly from 1812 to 1814. He was Recorder of New York City from 1823 to 1824. Beginning in 1826, he replaced Nathan Sanford as the Chancellor of the State, serving until 1828 when he became Chief Justice of the Superior Court of New York City and was replaced as Chancellor by Reuben H. Walworth.

Between 1828 and 1847, Jones was the chief justice of the New York City Superior Court. After the reorganization of the judicial system in the state, following the adoption of the Constitution of 1846, he was elected in 1847 a justice of the New York State Supreme Court in the First Judicial District, and he remained in that office until 1849. Representing the Supreme Court, First Judicial District, he was an ex officio member of the first New York Court of Appeals. Examples of his work may be found in Corning v McCullough (1 NY 47), involving a suit against a stockholder of a corporation, Ruckman v Pitcher (1 NY 392), an action to recover money deposited on an illegal wager, and Brewster v Striker (2 NY 19), concerning the legal interest that could pass by sale under judgment and execution.

Although then 80 years old, he returned to legal practice in 1849. The term "Father of the New York Bar", which first pertained to his father, also applied to him.

== Personal life ==
He was the father of Samuel Jones, who married a sister of Justice Joseph Barnard.

Jones died at the residence of his brother William in Cold Spring Harbor, New York on August 9, 1853.

Legal offices
Preceded by Richard Riker	Recorder of New York City; 1823–1824	Succeeded by Richard Riker
Preceded by Nathan Sanford	Chancellor of New York; 1826–1828	Succeeded by Reuben H. Walworth
