= 26th New York State Legislature =

New York state legislative session

←	25th	27th	→
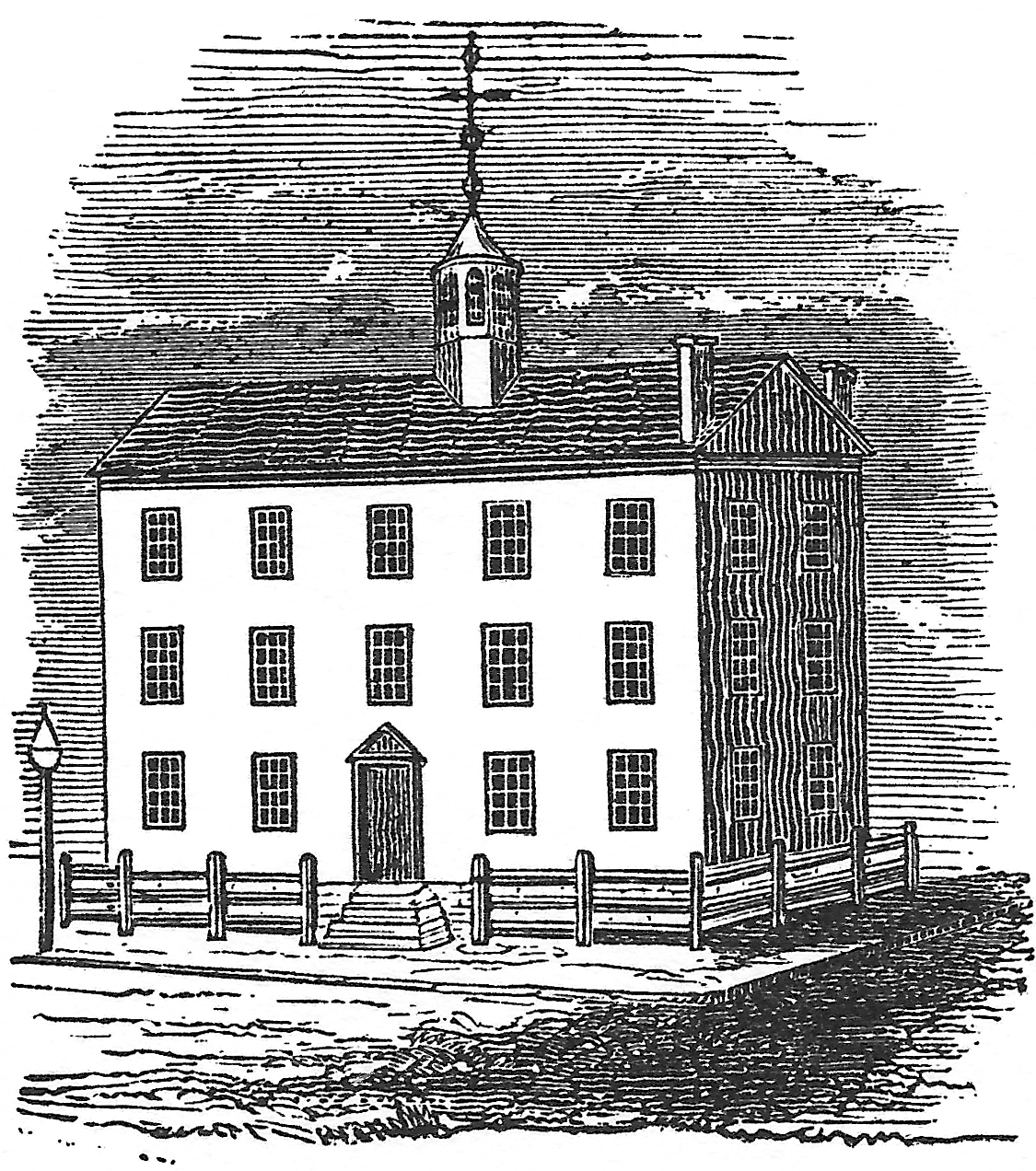
- The Old Albany City Hall (undated)

Overview
- Legislative body: New York State Legislature
- Jurisdiction: New York, United States
- Term: July 1, 1802 – June 30, 1803

Senate
- Members: 32
- President: Lt. Gov. Jeremiah Van Rensselaer (Dem.-Rep.)
- Party control: Democratic-Republican (19-11)

Assembly
- Members: 100
- Speaker: Thomas Storm (Dem.-Rep.)
- Party control: Democratic-Republican

Sessions
- 1st: January 25 – April 6, 1803

The 26th New York State Legislature, consisting of the New York State Senate and the New York State Assembly, met from January 25 to April 6, 1803, during the 2nd year of George Clinton's second tenure as Governor of New York, in Albany.

== Background ==
Under the provisions of the New York Constitution of 1777, amended by the Constitutional Convention of 1801, 32 Senators were elected on general tickets in the four senatorial districts for four-year terms. They were divided into four classes, and every year eight Senate seats came up for election. Assemblymen were elected countywide on general tickets to a one-year term, the whole assembly being renewed annually.

In 1797, Albany was declared the State capital, and all subsequent Legislatures have been meeting there ever since. In 1799, the Legislature enacted that future Legislatures meet on the last Tuesday of January of each year unless called earlier by the governor.

At this time the politicians were divided into two opposing political parties: the Federalists and the Democratic-Republicans.

== Elections ==
The State election was held from April 27 to 29, 1802. Senators John Schenck (Southern D.) and Solomon Sutherland (Middle D.) were re-elected. Joseph Annin, Matthias B. Tallmadge, George Tiffany (all three Western D.); and Assemblymen Abraham Adriance (Middle D.), Asa Danforth and Jacob Snell (both Western D.) were also elected to the Senate. All eight were Democratic-Republicans.

== Sessions ==
The Legislature met at the Old City Hall in Albany on January 25, 1803; and adjourned on April 6.

Dem.-Rep. Thomas Storm was re-elected Speaker. Solomon Southwick (Dem.-Rep.) was elected Clerk of the Assembly with 42 votes against 31 for the incumbent James Van Ingen (Fed.).

On February 1, 1803, the Legislature elected Theodorus Bailey (Dem.-Rep.) to the U.S. Senate, to succeed Gouverneur Morris (Fed.).

On February 8, 1803, the Legislature elected Abraham G. Lansing (Dem.-Rep.) State Treasurer, to succeed Robert McClellan (Fed.).

== State Senate ==
=== Districts ===
- The Southern District (6 seats) consisted of Kings, New York, Queens, Richmond, Suffolk and Westchester counties.
- The Middle District (8 seats) consisted of Dutchess, Orange, Ulster, Columbia, Delaware, Rockland and Greene counties.
- The Eastern District (7 seats) consisted of Washington, Clinton, Rensselaer, Albany, Saratoga and Essex counties.
- The Western District (11 seats) consisted of Montgomery, Herkimer, Ontario, Otsego, Tioga, Onondaga, Schoharie, Steuben, Chenango, Oneida, Cayuga and Genesee counties.
Note: There are now 62 counties in the State of New York. The counties which are not mentioned in this list had not yet been established, or sufficiently organized, the area being included in one or more of the abovementioned counties.

=== Members ===
The asterisk (*) denotes members of the previous Legislature who continued in office as members of this Legislature. Abraham Adriance, Asa Danforth and Jacob Snell changed from the Assembly to the Senate.

District	Senators	Term left	Party	Notes
Southern	Richard Hatfield*	1 year	Federalist	
Southern	William Denning*	2 years	Dem.-Rep.	
Southern	Benjamin Huntting*	2 years	Dem.-Rep.	
Southern	Ebenezer Purdy*	2 years	Dem.-Rep.	elected to the Council of Appointment
Southern	Ezra L'Hommedieu*	3 years	Dem.-Rep.	
Southern	John Schenck*	4 years	Dem.-Rep.	
Middle	John Hathorn*	1 year	Dem.-Rep.	
Middle	John Suffern*	1 year	Dem.-Rep.	
Middle	John C. Hogeboom*	2 years	Dem.-Rep.	elected to the Council of Appointment
Middle	James W. Wilkin*	2 years	Dem.-Rep.	
Middle	Jacobus S. Bruyn*	3 years	Dem.-Rep.	
Middle	Peter A. Van Bergen*	3 years	Dem.-Rep.	
Middle	(Solomon Sutherland*)	4 years	Dem.-Rep.	died September 10, 1802, before the Legislature met
Middle	Abraham Adriance*	4 years	Dem.-Rep.	
Eastern	Zina Hitchcock*	1 year	Federalist	
Eastern	Ebenezer Russell*	1 year	Federalist	
Eastern	Edward Savage*	1 year	Dem.-Rep.	
Eastern	James Gordon*	2 years	Federalist	
Eastern	Jacobus Van Schoonhoven*	3 years	Federalist	elected to the Council of Appointment
Eastern	Abraham Van Vechten*	3 years	Federalist	also Recorder of the City of Albany
Eastern	(Christopher Hutton*)	3 years	Dem.-Rep./Fed.	
Western	Vincent Mathews*	1 year	Federalist	
Western	Moss Kent*	1 year	Federalist	
Western	Robert Roseboom*	2 years	Dem.-Rep.	
Western	Jedediah Sanger*	2 years	Federalist	also First Judge of the Oneida County Court
Western	Lemuel Chipman*	3 years	Federalist	
Western	Isaac Foote	3 years	Federalist	
Western	Joseph Annin	4 years	Dem.-Rep.	
Western	Asa Danforth*	4 years	Dem.-Rep.	
Western	Jacob Snell*	4 years	Dem.-Rep.	elected to the Council of Appointment
Western	Matthias B. Tallmadge	4 years	Dem.-Rep.	
Western	George Tiffany	4 years	Dem.-Rep.	

=== Employees ===
- Clerk: Henry I. Bleecker

== State Assembly ==
=== Districts ===
- Albany County (6 seats)
- Cayuga County (3 seats)
- Chenango County (4 seats)
- Clinton County (1 seat)
- Columbia County (4 seats)
- Delaware County (2 seats)
- Dutchess County (7 seats)
- Essex County (1 seat)
- Genesee and Ontario counties (3 seats)
- Greene County (2 seats)
- Herkimer County (3 seats)
- Kings County (1 seat)
- Montgomery County (5 seats)
- The City and County of New York (9 seats)
- Oneida County (4 seats)
- Onondaga County (2 seats)
- Orange County (4 seats)
- Otsego County (4 seats)
- Queens County (3 seats)
- Rensselaer County (5 seats)
- Richmond County (1 seat)
- Rockland County (1 seat)
- Saratoga County (4 seats)
- Schoharie County (2 seats)
- Steuben County (1 seat)
- Suffolk County (3 seats)
- Tioga County (1 seat)
- Ulster County (4 seats)
- Washington County (6 seats)
- Westchester County (4 seats)
Note: There are now 62 counties in the State of New York. The counties which are not mentioned in this list had not yet been established, or sufficiently organized, the area being included in one or more of the abovementioned counties.

=== Assemblymen ===
The asterisk (*) denotes members of the previous Legislature who continued as members of this Legislature. Stephen Lush changed from the Senate to the Assembly.

District	Assemblymen	Party	Notes
Albany	Johann Jost Dietz*	Federalist	
Albany	John Frisby		
Albany	Stephen Lush*	Federalist	
Albany	Maus Schermerhorn		
Albany	Peter S. Schuyler*	Federalist	
Albany	Jacob Ten Eyck*	Federalist	
Cayuga	Salmon Buell*		
Cayuga	Silas Halsey	Dem.-Rep.	
Cayuga	Thomas Hewitt		
Chenango	James Green		
Chenango	Stephen Hoxie		
Chenango	Joel Thompson	Federalist	previously a member from Albany Co.
Chenango	Uri Tracy	Dem.-Rep.	also Chenango County Clerk
Clinton	Peter Sailly	Dem.-Rep.	
Columbia	Samuel Edmonds	Federalist	
Columbia	Aaron Kellogg	Federalist	
Columbia	Moncrief Livingston	Federalist	
Columbia	Peter Silvester	Federalist	
Delaware	John Lamb		
Delaware	Elias Osborn	Dem.-Rep.	
Dutchess	Joseph C. Field	Dem.-Rep.	
Dutchess	John Jewett	Dem.-Rep.	
Dutchess	John Martin	Dem.-Rep.	
Dutchess	Thomas Mitchell	Dem.-Rep.	
Dutchess	Philip Spencer Jr.	Dem.-Rep.	
Dutchess	Theodorus R. Van Wyck	Dem.-Rep.	
Dutchess	James Winchell	Dem.-Rep.	
Essex	Thomas Stower		
Genesee and Ontario	Thaddeus Chapin		
Genesee and Ontario	Augustus Porter	Dem.-Rep.	
Genesee and Ontario	Polydore B. Wisner		
Greene	George Hale	Federalist	
Greene	Martin G. Schuneman	Dem.-Rep.	previously a member from Ulster Co.
Herkimer	Stephen Miller	Dem.-Rep.	
Herkimer	George Widrig*	Dem.-Rep.	
Herkimer	Samuel Wright	Dem.-Rep.	
Kings	John Hicks		
Montgomery	Henry Kennedy		
Montgomery	John Roof		
Montgomery	Alexander Sheldon*	Dem.-Rep.	
Montgomery	Daniel Walker		
Montgomery	Charles Ward*	Dem.-Rep.	
New York	John Brower		
New York	John Burger		
New York	William Few*	Dem.-Rep.	
New York	William W. Gilbert	Dem.-Rep.	
New York	Peter Irving		
New York	Cornelius C. Roosevelt		
New York	Ezekiel Robins*	Dem.-Rep.	
New York	Thomas Storm*	Dem.-Rep.	re-elected Speaker
New York	Daniel D. Tompkins	Dem.-Rep.	
Oneida	James Dean Sr.		
Oneida	Abel French*	Federalist	
Oneida	John Lay		
Oneida	Aaron Morse		
Onondaga	John Lamb	Dem.-Rep.	
Onondaga	John McWhorter	Dem.-Rep.	
Orange	James Burt*	Dem.-Rep.	
Orange	William A. Clark		
Orange	James Finch Jr.		
Orange	Reuben Neely		
Otsego	Daniel Hawks		
Otsego	James Moore		
Otsego	Jedediah Peck*	Dem.-Rep.	
Otsego	Luther Rich		
Queens	Stephen Carman	Federalist	
Queens	Abraham Monfoort*	Dem.-Rep.	
Queens	Henry O. Seaman	Dem.-Rep.	
Rensselaer	John Green*	Dem.-Rep.	
Rensselaer	Jonathan Rouse	Dem.-Rep.	
Rensselaer	John Ryan	Dem.-Rep.	
Rensselaer	John Woodworth	Dem.-Rep.	
Rensselaer	vacant		Nicholas Staats (Dem.-Rep.) and Arent Van Dyck (Fed.) were tied in fifth place with 1,271 votes each, so there was "no choice".
Richmond	Paul I. Micheau*	Federalist	
Rockland	Peter Denoyelles*	Dem.-Rep.	
Saratoga	Samuel Clark*		
Saratoga	Adam Comstock*	Dem.-Rep.	
Saratoga	Gideon Goodrich	Dem.-Rep.	
Saratoga	Othniel Looker	Dem.-Rep.	
Schoharie	Henry Becker	Dem.-Rep.	
Schoharie	Lawrence Lawyer Jr.*	Dem.-Rep.	
Steuben	James Faulkner	Dem.-Rep.	
Suffolk	Israel Carll*	Dem.-Rep.	
Suffolk	Jonathan Dayton	Dem.-Rep.	
Suffolk	Josiah Reeve		
Tioga	Caleb Hyde*	Dem.-Rep.	
Ulster	Moses Cantine Jr.	Dem.-Rep.	
Ulster	James Kain		
Ulster	Cornelius Low	Federalist	
Ulster	Elnathan Sears*	Dem.-Rep.	
Washington	David Austin	Dem.-Rep.	
Washington	Kitchel Bishop*	Dem.-Rep.	
Washington	Alexander Cowan*	Dem.-Rep.	
Washington	Jason Kellogg*	Dem.-Rep.	
Washington	John McLean*	Dem.-Rep.	
Washington	Isaac Sargent*	Dem.-Rep.	
Westchester	Abijah Gilbert*	Dem.-Rep.	
Westchester	Abraham Odell*	Dem.-Rep.	
Westchester	Thomas Thomas*	Dem.-Rep.	
Westchester	Joseph Travis*	Dem.-Rep.	

=== Employees ===
- Clerk: Solomon Southwick
- Sergeant-at-Arms: Ephraim Hunt
- Doorkeeper: Benjamin Whipple

== Sources ==
- The New York Civil List compiled by Franklin Benjamin Hough (Weed, Parsons and Co., 1858) [see pg. 108f for Senate districts; pg. 118 for senators; pg. 148f for Assembly districts; pg. 176 for assemblymen]
- The History of Political Parties in the State of New-York, from the Ratification of the Federal Constitution to 1840 by Jabez D. Hammond (4th ed., Vol. 1, H. & E. Phinney, Cooperstown, 1846; pages 184ff)
- Election result Assembly, Columbia Co. at project "A New Nation Votes", compiled by Phil Lampi, hosted by Tufts University Digital Library
- Election result Assembly, Dutchess Co. at project "A New Nation Votes"
- Election result Assembly, Greene Co. at project "A New Nation Votes"
- Election result Assembly, Herkimer Co. at project "A New Nation Votes"
- Election result Assembly, Queens Co. at project "A New Nation Votes"
- Election result Assembly, Rensselaer Co. at project "A New Nation Votes"
- Election result Assembly, Schoharie Co. at project "A New Nation Votes"
- Election result Assembly, Steuben Co. at project "A New Nation Votes"
- Election result Assembly, Washington Co. at project "A New Nation Votes"
- Election result Assembly, Westchester Co. at project "A New Nation Votes"
- Partial election result Senate, Southern D. at project "A New Nation Votes" [gives only votes from Richmond and Westchester co.]
- Partial election result Senate, Middle D. at project "A New Nation Votes" [gives only votes from Columbia, Delaware, Dutchess and Greene co.]
- Partial election result Senate, Western D. at project "A New Nation Votes" [gives only votes from Schoharie and Steuben co.]
