= 24th New York State Legislature =

New York state legislative session

←	23rd	25th	→
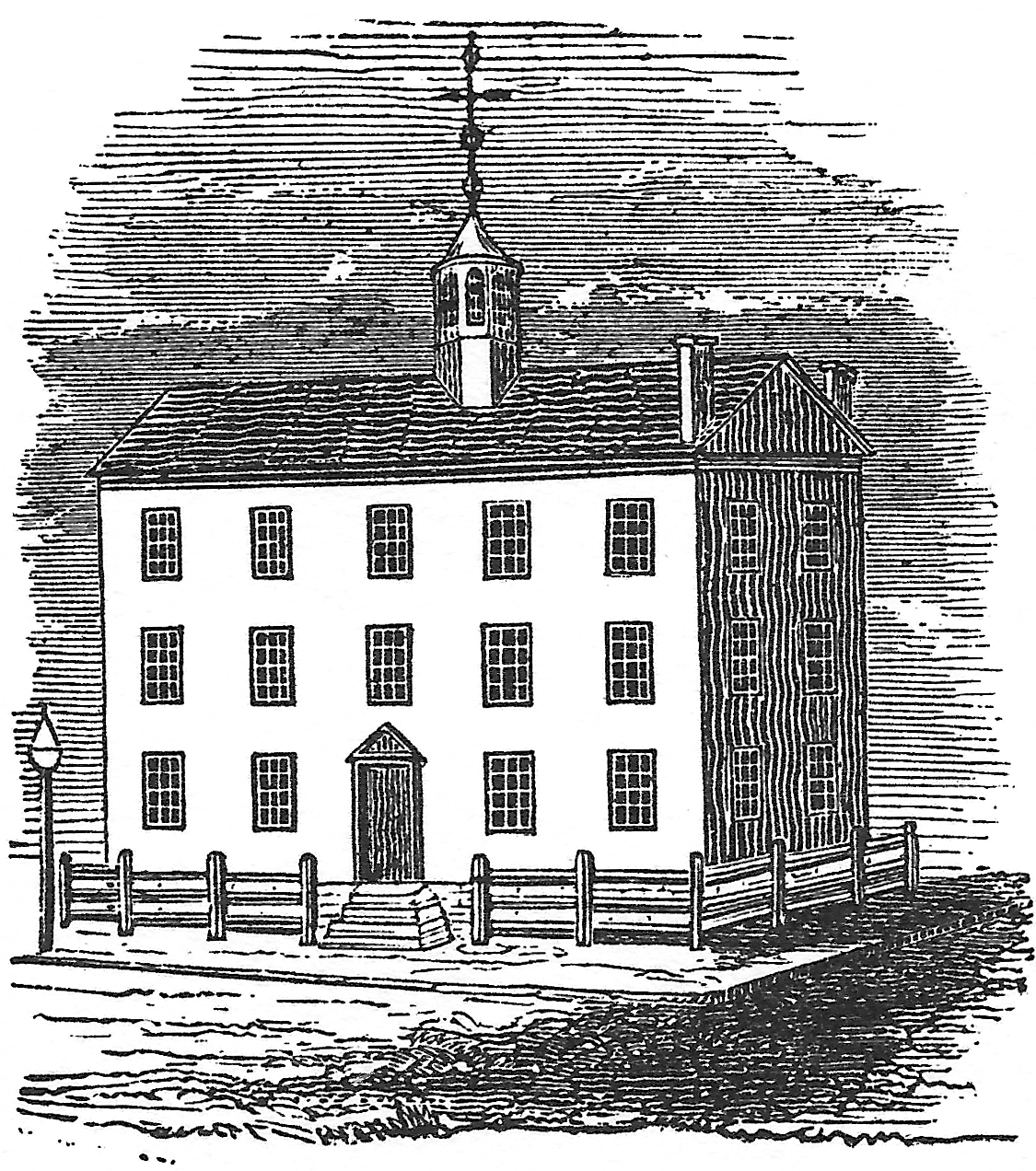
- The Old Albany City Hall (undated)

Overview
- Legislative body: New York State Legislature
- Jurisdiction: New York, United States
- Term: July 1, 1800 – June 30, 1801

Senate
- Members: 43
- President: Lt. Gov. Stephen Van Rensselaer (Fed.)
- Party control: Federalist (25-18)

Assembly
- Members: 108
- Speaker: Samuel Osgood (Dem.-Rep.)
- Party control: Democratic-Republican

Sessions
- 1st: November 4 – 8, 1800
- 2nd: January 27 – April 8, 1801

The 24th New York State Legislature, consisting of the New York State Senate and the New York State Assembly, met from November 4, 1800, to April 8, 1801, during the sixth year of John Jay's governorship, in Albany.

== Background ==
Under the provisions of the New York Constitution of 1777, amended by the re-apportionment of March 4, 1796, Senators were elected on general tickets in the senatorial districts for four-year terms. They were divided into four classes, and every year about one fourth of the Senate seats came up for election. Assemblymen were elected countywide on general tickets to a one-year term, the whole assembly being renewed annually.

In 1797, Albany was declared the State capital, and all subsequent Legislatures have been meeting there ever since. In 1799, the Legislature enacted that future Legislatures meet on the last Tuesday of January of each year unless called earlier by the governor.

Senator John Addison died in 1800, leaving a vacancy in the Middle District.

In 1800, Greene County was created from parts of Albany and Ulster counties, and was apportioned 2 seats in the Assembly, one each taken from Albany and Ulster.

In August 1800, U.S. Senator John Laurance (Fed.) resigned.

At this time the politicians were divided into two opposing political parties: the Federalists and the Democratic-Republicans.

== Elections ==
The State election was held from April 29 to May 1, 1800. Senators William Denning (Southern D.), James Gordon (Eastern D.) and Jedediah Sanger (Western D.) were re-elected. Benjamin Huntting, Ebenezer Purdy (both Southern D.), James W. Wilkin, David Van Ness, Solomon Sutherland, John C. Hogeboom (all four Middle D.), Stephen Lush (Eastern D.) and Assemblyman Robert Roseboom (Western D.) were also elected to full terms in the Senate. Jacobus S. Bruyn (Middle D.) was elected to a one-year term to fill the vacancy. Gordon, Sanger and Lush were Federalists, the other nine were Democratic-Republicans.

== Sessions ==
The Legislature met at the Old City Hall in Albany on November 4, 1800, to elect presidential electors; and the Senate adjourned on November 7, the Assembly on November 8.

Dem.-Rep. Samuel Osgood was elected Speaker with 62 votes against 31 for Federalist Dirck Ten Broeck.

On November 6, 1800, the Legislature elected 12 presidential electors, all Democratic-Republicans: William Floyd, Isaac Ledyard, Anthony Lispenard, Philip Van Cortlandt Jr., James Burt, Gilbert Livingston, Thomas Jenkins, Peter Van Ness, Robert Ellis, John Woodworth, Jeremiah Van Rensselaer and Jacob Eaker. They cast their votes for Thomas Jefferson and Aaron Burr.

On November 6, 1800, the Legislature elected John Armstrong (Dem.-Rep.) to fill the vacancy in the U.S. Senate.

The Legislature met for the regular session on January 27, 1801; and adjourned on April 8.

On January 27, 1801, John Armstrong was re-elected to a full term in the U.S. Senate.

On February 26, 1801, Gov. John Jay sent a message to the Assembly about the controversy that had arisen in the Council of Appointment concerning the right to nominate appointees. Jay held that only the governor could nominate somebody, and the councillors then could only approve or reject this nomination. The Dem.-Rep. councillors however claimed that they too had the right to nominate appointees, and Jay had adjourned the council and did not make any appointments anymore. Jay asked the Assembly to solve the problem, but they refused, claiming that it was a constitutional issue to be decided by the Governor and Council. Jay asked then the chancellor and the justices of the New York Supreme Court for their opinion, but they refused to give it, claiming that to give opinions was outside the scope of their constitutional duties. To find a way out of the impasse, the Legislature passed on April 6 an "Act Recommending a Convention" which called for the election of delegates to a convention, to consider amending the State Constitution concerning the Council of Appointment and the apportionment of the State Legislature.

== State Senate ==
=== Districts ===
- The Southern District (9 seats) consisted of Kings, New York, Queens, Richmond, Suffolk and Westchester counties.
- The Middle District (12 seats) consisted of Dutchess, Orange, Ulster, Columbia, Delaware, Rockland and Greene counties.
- The Eastern District (11 seats) consisted of Washington, Clinton, Rensselaer, Albany, Saratoga and Essex counties.
- The Western District (11 seats) consisted of Montgomery, Herkimer, Ontario, Otsego, Tioga, Onondaga, Schoharie, Steuben, Chenango, Oneida and Cayuga counties.
Note: There are now 62 counties in the State of New York. The counties which are not mentioned in this list had not yet been established, or sufficiently organized, the area being included in one or more of the abovementioned counties.

=== Members ===
The asterisk (*) denotes members of the previous Legislature who continued in office as members of this Legislature. Robert Roseboom changed from the Assembly to the Senate.

District	Senators	Term left	Party	Notes
Southern	Ezra L'Hommedieu*	1 year	Dem.-Rep.	
Southern	DeWitt Clinton*	2 years	Dem.-Rep.	elected to the Council of Appointment
Southern	David Gelston*	2 years	Dem.-Rep.	also Surrogate of New York County
Southern	John Schenck*	2 year	Dem.-Rep.	
Southern	John B. Coles*	3 years	Federalist	
Southern	Richard Hatfield*	3 years	Federalist	
Southern	William Denning*	4 years	Dem.-Rep.	
Southern	Benjamin Huntting	4 years	Dem.-Rep.	
Southern	Ebenezer Purdy	4 years	Dem.-Rep.	
Middle	Jacobus S. Bruyn	1 year	Dem.-Rep.	elected to fill vacancy, in place of John Addison
Middle	Peter Cantine Jr.*	1 year	Federalist	
Middle	James G. Graham*	1 year	Dem.-Rep.	
Middle	Ebenezer Foote*	2 years	Federalist	also Delaware County Clerk
Middle	Ambrose Spencer*	2 years	Dem.-Rep.	also Assistant Attorney General (3rd D.); elected to the Council of Appointment
Middle	Isaac Bloom*	3 years	Dem.-Rep.	
Middle	John Hathorn*	3 years	Dem.-Rep.	
Middle	John Suffern*	3 years	Dem.-Rep.	
Middle	John C. Hogeboom	4 years	Dem.-Rep.	
Middle	Solomon Sutherland	4 years	Dem.-Rep.	
Middle	David Van Ness	4 years	Dem.-Rep.	
Middle	James W. Wilkin	4 years	Dem.-Rep.	
Eastern	Ebenezer Clark*	1 year	Federalist	
Eastern	Anthony Ten Eyck*	1 year	Federalist	
Eastern	Jacobus Van Schoonhoven*	1 year	Federalist	
Eastern	Abraham Van Vechten*	1 year	Federalist	also Recorder of the City of Albany
Eastern	Leonard Gansevoort*	2 years	Federalist	
Eastern	John Sanders*	2 years	Federalist	elected to the Council of Appointment
Eastern	Zina Hitchcock*	3 years	Federalist	
Eastern	Ebenezer Russell*	3 years	Federalist	
Eastern	Moses Vail*	3 years	Federalist	vacated his seat upon appointment as Sheriff of Rensselaer County on November 11, 1800
Eastern	James Gordon*	4 years	Federalist	
Eastern	Stephen Lush	4 years	Federalist	
Western	Thomas Morris*	1 year	Federalist	elected in April 1800 to the 7th United States Congress
Western	Michael Myers*	1 year	Federalist	
Western	Seth Phelps*	1 year	Federalist	
Western	William Beekman*	2 years	Federalist	
Western	John Frey*	2 years	Federalist	
Western	Frederick Gettman*	2 years	Federalist	
Western	Thomas R. Gold*	2 years	Federalist	also Assistant Attorney General (7th D.)
Western	Vincent Mathews*	3 years	Federalist	
Western	Moss Kent*	3 years	Federalist	
Western	Robert Roseboom*	4 years	Dem.-Rep.	elected to the Council of Appointment
Western	Jedediah Sanger*	4 years	Federalist	also First Judge of the Oneida County Court

=== Employees ===
- Clerk: Abraham B. Bancker

== State Assembly ==
=== Districts ===
- Albany County (8 seats)
- Cayuga County (1 seat)
- Chenango County (2 seats)
- Clinton and Essex counties (1 seat)
- Columbia County (6 seats)
- Delaware County (2 seats)
- Dutchess County (10 seats)
- Greene County (2 seats)
- Herkimer County (3 seats)
- Kings County (1 seat)
- Montgomery County (6 seats)
- The City and County of New York (13 seats)
- Oneida County (3 seats)
- Onondaga County (1 seat)
- Ontario and Steuben counties (2 seats)
- Orange County (5 seats)
- Otsego County (4 seats)
- Queens County (4 seats)
- Rensselaer County (6 seats)
- Richmond County (1 seat)
- Rockland County (1 seat)
- Saratoga County (5 seats)
- Schoharie County (1 seat)
- Suffolk County (4 seats)
- Tioga County (1 seat)
- Ulster County (4 seats)
- Washington County (6 seats)
- Westchester County (5 seats)
Note: There are now 62 counties in the State of New York. The counties which are not mentioned in this list had not yet been established, or sufficiently organized, the area being included in one or more of the abovementioned counties.

=== Assemblymen ===
The asterisk (*) denotes members of the previous Legislature who continued as members of this Legislature.

District	Assemblymen	Party	Notes
Albany	Johann Jost Dietz*	Federalist	f
Albany	Prince Doty*	Federalist	
Albany	John Vernon Henry*	Federalist	also New York State Comptroller
Albany	Joseph Shurtleff*	Federalist	
Albany	Dirck Ten Broeck*	Federalist	
Albany	Jacob Ten Eyck	Federalist	
Albany	Peter West	Federalist	
Albany	Jacob Winne*	Federalist	
Cayuga	Silas Halsey*	Dem.-Rep.	
Chenango	Jonathan Forman		
Chenango	James Glover		
Clinton and Essex	vacant		Benjamin Mooers and Daniel Ross were tied in first place with 229 votes each, so there was "no choice"
Columbia	William Cantine	Federalist	
Columbia	Asa Douglass	Federalist	
Columbia	Dirck Gardenier	Federalist	
Columbia	Ezekiel Gilbert*	Federalist	
Columbia	John Livingston	Federalist	
Columbia	Elisha Williams	Federalist	
Delaware	Gabriel North	Dem.-Rep.	
Delaware	Erastus Root	Dem.-Rep.	
Dutchess	Abraham Adriance*	Dem.-Rep.	
Dutchess	Benjamin Akins	Dem.-Rep.	
Dutchess	Elisha Barlow	Dem.-Rep.	
Dutchess	Nicholas H. Emigh	Dem.-Rep.	
Dutchess	Robert Johnston*	Dem.-Rep.	
Dutchess	Ebenezer Mott*	Federalist	
Dutchess	Zalman Sanford		
Dutchess	Isaac Sherwood*	Dem.-Rep.	
Dutchess	Smith Thompson	Dem.-Rep.	
Dutchess	John M. Thurston	Dem.-Rep.	
Greene	Thomas E. Barker	Federalist	previously a member from Albany Co.
Greene	Caleb Benton		previously a member from Columbia Co.
Herkimer	Nathan Smith	Dem.-Rep.	
Herkimer	Evans Wharry	Dem.-Rep.	
Herkimer	George Widrig	Dem.-Rep.	
Kings	Jacob Sharpe Jr.*	Dem.-Rep.	
Montgomery	Cornelius Humfrey*	Dem.-Rep.	
Montgomery	Archibald McIntyre*	Dem.-Rep.	
Montgomery	Alexander Sheldon	Dem.-Rep.	
Montgomery	Jacob Snell*	Dem.-Rep.	
Montgomery	Simon Veeder*	Dem.-Rep.	
Montgomery	Christopher P. Yates	Dem.-Rep.	
New York	Philip I. Arcularius	Dem.-Rep.	
New York	John Broome	Dem.-Rep.	
New York	George Clinton	Dem.-Rep.	in April 1801 elected again Governor of New York
New York	Horatio Gates	Dem.-Rep.	
New York	James Hunt	Dem.-Rep.	
New York	Henry Brockholst Livingston	Dem.-Rep.	
New York	Elias Nexsen	Dem.-Rep.	
New York	Samuel Osgood	Dem.-Rep.	elected Speaker
New York	Ezekiel Robins	Dem.-Rep.	
New York	Henry Rutgers	Dem.-Rep.	
New York	Thomas Storm	Dem.-Rep.	
New York	John Swartwout	Dem.-Rep.	
New York	George Warner	Dem.-Rep.	
Oneida	Jesse Curtiss		
Oneida	Abel French	Federalist	
Oneida	David Ostrom*	Federalist	
Onondaga	Asa Danforth	Dem.-Rep.	
Ontario and Steuben	Lemuel Chipman	Federalist	
Ontario and Steuben	Nathaniel Norton*	Federalist	
Orange	Aaron Burr	Dem.-Rep.	previously a member from New York City; elected U.S. Vice President on February 17, 1801, and took office on March 4, thus vacating his seat in the Assembly
Orange	James Clinton	Dem.-Rep.	previously a member from Ulster Co.
Orange	Andrew McCord*	Dem.-Rep.	
Orange	Peter Townsend	Dem.-Rep.	
Orange	Henry Tucker	Dem.-Rep.	
Otsego	Benjamin Hicks	Federalist	previously a member from Rensselaer Co.
Otsego	Solomon Martin	Federalist	
Otsego	Jedediah Peck*	Dem.-Rep.	
Otsego	Jacob Ten Broeck*	Dem.-Rep.	
Queens	Jonah Hallett*	Dem.-Rep.	
Queens	Abraham Monfoort*	Dem.-Rep.	
Queens	Joseph Pettit	Dem.-Rep.	
Queens	John I. Skidmore*	Dem.-Rep.	
Rensselaer	Jonathan Brown	Dem.-Rep.	
Rensselaer	John Lovett	Federalist	
Rensselaer	James McKown*	Federalist	
Rensselaer	Josiah Masters*	Dem.-Rep.	
Rensselaer	Hosea Moffitt	Federalist	
Rensselaer	John E. Van Alen	Federalist	
Richmond	Paul I. Micheau	Federalist	
Rockland	Samuel G. Verbryck*		
Saratoga	Daniel Bull*		
Saratoga	Adam Comstock*	Dem.-Rep.	
Saratoga	Henry Corl Jr.	Federalist	
Saratoga	James Merrill		
Saratoga	James Warren*		
Schoharie	Joseph Borst Jr.		
Suffolk	Nicoll Floyd*	Dem.-Rep.	
Suffolk	Jared Landon*	Dem.-Rep.	
Suffolk	Abraham Miller	Dem.-Rep.	
Suffolk	Mills Phillips	Dem.-Rep.	
Tioga	Edward Edwards	Federalist	
Ulster	Benjamin Bevier Jr.	Dem.-Rep.	
Ulster	Conrad E. Elmendorf	Federalist	also Assistant Attorney General (2nd D.)
Ulster	Philip Eltinge	Federalist	
Ulster	Joseph Hasbrouck Jr.	Dem.-Rep.	
Washington	Seth Alden	Federalist	
Washington	David Hopkins	Federalist	
Washington	Gerrit G. Lansing	Federalist	
Washington	Timothy Leonard	Federalist	
Washington	William McAuley	Federalist	
Washington	Edward Savage*	Dem.-Rep.	
Westchester	Abijah Gilbert	Dem.-Rep.	
Westchester	Robert Graham	Federalist	
Westchester	Abraham Odell	Dem.-Rep.	
Westchester	Abel Smith*	Dem.-Rep.	
Westchester	Thomas Thomas	Dem.-Rep.	

=== Employees ===
- Clerk: James Van Ingen
- Sergeant-at-Arms: Ephraim Hunt
- Doorkeeper: Peter Hansen

== Sources ==
- The New York Civil List compiled by Franklin Benjamin Hough (Weed, Parsons and Co., 1858) [see pg. 108f for Senate districts; pg. 117f for senators; pg. 148f for Assembly districts; pg. 174 for assemblymen; pg. 320 and 324 for presidential electors]
- Election result Assembly, Cayuga Co. at project "A New Nation Votes", compiled by Phil Lampi, hosted by Tufts University Digital Library
- Election result Assembly, Clinton and Essex Co. at project "A New Nation Votes"
- Election result Assembly, Dutchess Co. at project "A New Nation Votes"
- Election result Assembly, Kings Co. at project "A New Nation Votes"
- Election result Assembly, Onondaga Co. at project "A New Nation Votes"
- Election result Assembly, Queens Co. at project "A New Nation Votes"
- Election result Assembly, Rensselaer Co. at project "A New Nation Votes"
- Election result Assembly, Richmond Co. at project "A New Nation Votes"
- Election result Assembly, Schoharie Co. at project "A New Nation Votes"
- Election result Assembly, Suffolk Co. at project "A New Nation Votes"
- Election result Assembly, Westchester Co. at project "A New Nation Votes"
- Election result Senate, Southern D. at project "A New Nation Votes" [does not add up totals]
- Partial election result Senate, Middle D. at project "A New Nation Votes" [gives only votes from Columbia and Dutchess counties]
- Partial election result Senate, Eastern D. at project "A New Nation Votes" [gives only votes from Albany and Rensselaer counties]
- Partial election result Senate, Western D. at project "A New Nation Votes" [gives only votes from Onondaga County]
- Election result Speaker at project "A New Nation Votes"
