= 27th New York State Legislature =

New York state legislative session

←	26th	28th	→
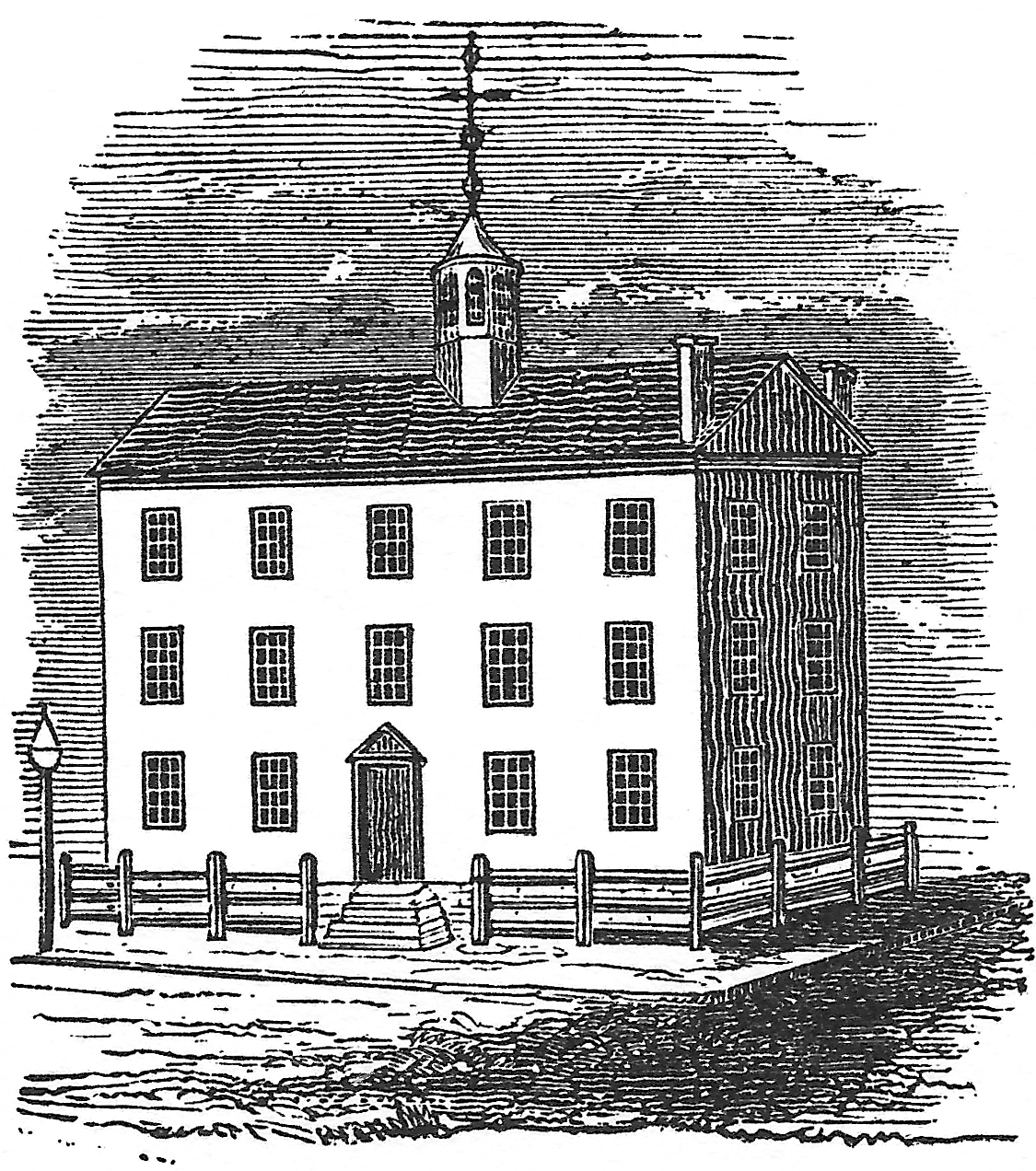
- The Old Albany City Hall (undated)

Overview
- Legislative body: New York State Legislature
- Jurisdiction: New York, United States
- Term: July 1, 1803 – June 30, 1804

Senate
- Members: 32
- President: Lt. Gov. Jeremiah Van Rensselaer (Dem.-Rep.)
- Party control: Democratic-Republican (26-6)

Assembly
- Members: 100
- Speaker: Alexander Sheldon (Dem.-Rep.)
- Party control: Democratic-Republican (83-17)

Sessions
- 1st: January 31 – April 11, 1804

The 27th New York State Legislature, consisting of the New York State Senate and the New York State Assembly, met from January 31 to April 11, 1804, during the third year of George Clinton's second tenure as Governor of New York, in Albany.

== Background ==
Under the provisions of the New York Constitution of 1777, amended by the Constitutional Convention of 1801, 32 Senators were elected on general tickets in the four senatorial districts for four-year terms. They were divided into four classes, and every year eight Senate seats came up for election. Assemblymen were elected countywide on general tickets to a one-year term, the whole assembly being renewed annually.

In 1797, Albany was declared the State capital, and all subsequent Legislatures have been meeting there ever since. In 1799, the Legislature enacted that future Legislatures meet on the last Tuesday of January of each year unless called earlier by the governor.

State Senator Solomon Sutherland died on September 10, 1802, leaving a vacancy in the Middle District.

In 1803, Montgomery County, and two seats were transferred from the Western to the Eastern District.

U.S. Senator DeWitt Clinton resigned on November 4, 1803, after his appointment as Mayor of New York City, and Governor George Clinton appointed John Armstrong to fill the vacancy temporarily.

U.S. Senator Theodorus Bailey resigned on January 16, 1804, after his appointment as Postmaster of New York City.

At this time the politicians were divided into two opposing political parties: the Federalists and the Democratic-Republicans. The Democratic-Republican Party split into two opposing factions at the gubernatorial election of 1804: the "Regulars" who supported Morgan Lewis, and the "Burrites" who supported Vice President Aaron Burr. Lewis had been nominated for Governor by his party, but Burr, after being dropped from the presidential ticket in favor of Gov. George Clinton, ran against Lewis. Burr also received the support of the majority of the Federalists although his enemy Alexander Hamilton, the leader of the Federalists, advocated against it and supported Lewis.

== Elections ==
The State election was held from April 26 to 28, 1803. Senator Edward Savage (Eastern D.) was re-elected. John Broome (Southern D.), Joshua H. Brett, Robert Johnston (both Middle D.), John Tayler and Thomas Tredwell (both Eastern D.); and Assemblymen John Woodworth (Eastern D.) and Caleb Hyde (Western D.) were also elected to full terms in the Senate. Simon Veeder (Eastern D.) and Assemblyman James Burt were elected to fill the vacancies. All ten were Democratic-Republicans.

== Sessions ==
The Legislature met at the Old City Hall in Albany on January 31, 1804; and the Assembly adjourned on April 10, the Senate on April 11.

Dem.-Rep. Alexander Sheldon was elected Speaker.

On February 3, 1804, the Legislature elected two U.S. senators (both Dem.-Rep.): John Armstrong to succeed himself, and John Smith to succeed Theodorus Bailey.

== State Senate ==
=== Districts ===
- The Southern District (6 seats) consisted of Kings, New York, Queens, Richmond, Suffolk and Westchester counties.
- The Middle District (8 seats) consisted of Dutchess, Orange, Ulster, Columbia, Delaware, Rockland and Greene counties.
- The Eastern District (9 seats) consisted of Washington, Clinton, Rensselaer, Albany, Saratoga, Essex and Montgomery counties.
- The Western District (9 seats) consisted of Herkimer, Ontario, Otsego, Tioga, Onondaga, Schoharie, Steuben, Chenango, Oneida, Cayuga and Genesee counties.
Note: There are now 62 counties in the State of New York. The counties which are not mentioned in this list had not yet been established, or sufficiently organized, the area being included in one or more of the abovementioned counties.

=== Members ===
The asterisk (*) denotes members of the previous Legislature who continued in office as members of this Legislature. James Burt, John Woodworth and Caleb Hyde changed from the Assembly to the Senate.

District	Senators	Term left	Party	Notes
Southern	William Denning*	1 year	Dem.-Rep.	
Southern	Benjamin Huntting*	1 year	Dem.-Rep.	
Southern	Ebenezer Purdy*	1 year	Dem.-Rep.	
Southern	Ezra L'Hommedieu*	2 years	Dem.-Rep.	
Southern	John Schenck*	3 years	Dem.-Rep.	
Southern	John Broome	4 years	Dem.-Rep.	elected to the Council of Appointment; in April 1804 elected Lieutenant Governor of New York
Middle	John C. Hogeboom*	1 year	Dem.-Rep.	
Middle	James W. Wilkin*	1 year	Dem.-Rep.	
Middle	Jacobus S. Bruyn*	2 years	Dem.-Rep.	
Middle	Peter A. Van Bergen*	2 years	Dem.-Rep.	
Middle	James Burt*	3 years	Dem.-Rep./Burrite	elected to fill the vacancy, in place of Solomon Sutherland
Middle	Abraham Adriance*	3 years	Dem.-Rep.	elected to the Council of Appointment
Middle	Joshua H. Brett	4 years	Dem.-Rep.	
Middle	Robert Johnston	4 years	Dem.-Rep.	
Eastern	James Gordon*	1 year	Federalist	
Eastern	Jacobus Van Schoonhoven*	2 years	Federalist	
Eastern	Abraham Van Vechten*	2 years	Federalist	also Recorder of the City of Albany
Eastern	Simon Veeder	2 years	Dem.-Rep.	elected to fill the vacancy, in place of Christopher Hutton
Eastern	Jacob Snell*	3 years	Dem.-Rep.	Snell lived in Montgomery Co. and had been elected in the Western District in 1802
Eastern	Edward Savage*	4 years	Dem.-Rep.	
Eastern	John Tayler	4 years	Dem.-Rep.	
Eastern	Thomas Tredwell	4 years	Dem.-Rep.	elected to the Council of Appointment
Eastern	John Woodworth*	4 years	Dem.-Rep.	from February 3, 1804, also New York Attorney General
Western	Robert Roseboom*	1 year	Dem.-Rep.	
Western	Jedediah Sanger*	1 year	Federalist	also the First Judge of the Oneida County Court
Western	Lemuel Chipman*	2 years	Federalist	
Western	Isaac Foote*	2 years	Federalist	
Western	Joseph Annin*	3 years	Dem.-Rep./Burrite	
Western	Asa Danforth*	3 years	Dem.-Rep.	
Western	Matthias B. Tallmadge*	3 years	Dem.-Rep.	
Western	George Tiffany*	3 years	Dem.-Rep.	
Western	Caleb Hyde*	4 years	Dem.-Rep.	elected to the Council of Appointment

=== Employees ===
- Clerk: Henry I. Bleecker

== State Assembly ==
=== Districts ===
- Albany County (6 seats)
- Cayuga County (3 seats)
- Chenango County (4 seats)
- Clinton County (1 seat)
- Columbia County (4 seats)
- Delaware County (2 seats)
- Dutchess County (7 seats)
- Essex County (1 seat)
- Genesee and Ontario counties (3 seats)
- Greene County (2 seats)
- Herkimer County (3 seats)
- Kings County (1 seat)
- Montgomery County (5 seats)
- The City and County of New York (9 seats)
- Oneida County (4 seats)
- Onondaga County (2 seats)
- Orange County (4 seats)
- Otsego County (4 seats)
- Queens County (3 seats)
- Rensselaer County (5 seats)
- Richmond County (1 seat)
- Rockland County (1 seat)
- Saratoga County (4 seats)
- Schoharie County (2 seats)
- Steuben County (1 seat)
- Suffolk County (3 seats)
- Tioga County (1 seat)
- Ulster County (4 seats)
- Washington County (6 seats)
- Westchester County (4 seats)
Note: There are now 62 counties in the State of New York. The counties which are not mentioned in this list had not yet been established, or sufficiently organized, the area being included in one or more of the abovementioned counties.

=== Assemblymen ===
The asterisk (*) denotes members of the previous Legislature who continued as members of this Legislature.

County	Assemblymen	Party	Notes
Albany	John Beekman Jr.		
Albany	Johann Jost Dietz*	Federalist	
Albany	James Emott	Federalist	
Albany	Peter S. Schuyler*	Federalist	
Albany	Moses Smith		
Albany	vacant		
Cayuga	Silas Halsey	Dem.-Rep.	in April 1804, elected to the 9th United States Congress
Cayuga	Thomas Hewitt*		
Cayuga	Amos Rathbun	Dem.-Rep.	
Chenango	Obadiah German	Dem.-Rep.	
Chenango	Stephen Hoxie*		
Chenango	James Moore		
Chenango	Joel Thompson*	Federalist	
Clinton	Benjamin Mooers	Dem.-Rep.	
Columbia	Benjamin Birdsall	Dem.-Rep.	
Columbia	Stephen Miller	Dem.-Rep.	
Columbia	Samuel Ten Broeck	Dem.-Rep.	
Columbia	James I. Van Alen	Dem.-Rep.	
Delaware	Gabriel North	Dem.-Rep.	
Delaware	Elias Osborn*	Dem.-Rep.	
Dutchess	Joseph E. Haff	Dem.-Rep.	
Dutchess	John Martin*	Dem.-Rep.	
Dutchess	Thomas Mitchell*	Dem.-Rep.	
Dutchess	Zalmon Sanford	Dem.-Rep.	
Dutchess	William Taber	Dem.-Rep./Burrite	
Dutchess	Benajah Thompson	Dem.-Rep.	
Dutchess	Theodorus R. Van Wyck*	Dem.-Rep.	
Essex	Theodorus Ross	Dem.-Rep.	
Genesee and Ontario	Amos Hall		
Genesee and Ontario	Nathaniel W. Howell	Federalist	
Genesee and Ontario	Polydore B. Wisner*		
Greene	Stephen Simmons	Federalist	
Greene	Stoddard Smith	Federalist	
Herkimer	Evans Wharry	Dem.-Rep.	
Herkimer	George Widrig*	Dem.-Rep.	
Herkimer	Samuel Wright*	Dem.-Rep.	
Kings	John Hicks*	Dem.-Rep.	
Montgomery	John Herkimer	Dem.-Rep.	
Montgomery	Henry Kennedy*		
Montgomery	Archibald McIntyre	Dem.-Rep.	also Deputy Secretary of State of New York
Montgomery	Alexander Sheldon*	Dem.-Rep.	elected Speaker
Montgomery	David J. Zeilly		
New York	Samuel Bradhurst		
New York	George Clinton, Jr.	Dem.-Rep.	
New York	Peter Curtenius		
New York	William Few*	Dem.-Rep.	
New York	Henry Rutgers	Dem.-Rep.	
New York	Peter A. Schenck		
New York	Solomon Townsend		
New York	James Warner	Dem.-Rep.	
New York	Peter H. Wendover	Dem.-Rep.	
Oneida	David Coffeen		
Oneida	Joseph Kirkland	Federalist	
Oneida	David Ostrom	Federalist	
Oneida	Abraham Van Eps	Federalist	
Onondaga	James Geddes	Federalist	
Onondaga	John McWhorter*	Dem.-Rep.	
Orange	Joshua Brown		
Orange	Robert R. Burnet		
Orange	Samuel S. Seward	Federalist	
Orange	Henry Tucker		
Otsego	Peter P. Dumont		
Otsego	Jedediah Peck*	Dem.-Rep.	
Otsego	Solomon Pier		
Otsego	Henry Scott	Dem.-Rep.	
Queens	Stephen Carman*	Federalist	
Queens	John D. Ditmis	Dem.-Rep.	
Queens	William Mott	Dem.-Rep.	
Rensselaer	Asa Mann	Dem.-Rep.	
Rensselaer	Jonathan Rouse*	Dem.-Rep.	
Rensselaer	Charles Selden	Dem.-Rep.	
Rensselaer	William Steward	Dem.-Rep.	
Rensselaer	Samuel Vary Jr.	Dem.-Rep.	
Richmond	John Houseman	Dem.-Rep.	
Rockland	Samuel G. Verbryck	Dem.-Rep.	
Saratoga	Adam Comstock*	Dem.-Rep.	
Saratoga	John Hunter	Dem.-Rep.	
Saratoga	Samuel Lewis	Dem.-Rep.	
Saratoga	Othniel Looker*	Dem.-Rep.	
Schoharie	Henry Becker*	Dem.-Rep.	
Schoharie	Freegift Patchin	Dem.-Rep.	
Steuben	James Faulkner*	Dem.-Rep.	
Suffolk	Israel Carll*	Dem.-Rep.	
Suffolk	Sylvester Dering	Dem.-Rep.	
Suffolk	David Hedges	Dem.-Rep.	
Tioga	Ashbel Wells		
Ulster	Benjamin Bevier	Dem.-Rep.	
Ulster	Lucas Elmendorf	Dem.-Rep.	
Ulster	Joseph Hasbrouck Jr.	Dem.-Rep.	
Ulster	James Ross	Dem.-Rep.	
Washington	David Austin*	Dem.-Rep.	
Washington	Kitchel Bishop*	Dem.-Rep.	
Washington	William Livingston		
Washington	John McKinney		
Washington	John McLean*	Dem.-Rep.	
Washington	Stephen Thorn		
Westchester	Abijah Gilbert*	Dem.-Rep.	
Westchester	Abraham Odell*	Dem.-Rep.	
Westchester	Thomas Thomas*	Dem.-Rep.	
Westchester	Joseph Travis*	Dem.-Rep.	

=== Employees ===
- Clerk: Solomon Southwick
- Sergeant-at-Arms: Benjamin Haight
- Doorkeeper: Benjamin Whipple

== Sources ==
- The New York Civil List compiled by Franklin Benjamin Hough (Weed, Parsons and Co., 1858) [see pg. 108f for Senate districts; pg. 118f for senators; pg. 148f for Assembly districts; pg. 177 for assemblymen]
- The History of Political Parties in the State of New-York, from the Ratification of the Federal Constitution to 1840 by Jabez D. Hammond (4th ed., Vol. 1, H. & E. Phinney, Cooperstown, 1846; pages 202ff)
- Election result Assembly, Cayuga Co. at project "A New Nation Votes", compiled by Phil Lampi, hosted by Tufts University Digital Library
- Election result Assembly, Columbia Co. at project "A New Nation Votes" [gives wrong party affiliations]
- Election result Assembly, Delaware Co. at project "A New Nation Votes"
- Election result Assembly, Dutchess Co. at project "A New Nation Votes"
- Election result Assembly, Greene Co. at project "A New Nation Votes"
- Election result Assembly, Herkimer Co. at project "A New Nation Votes"
- Election result Assembly, Montgomery Co. at project "A New Nation Votes"
- Election result Assembly, Onondaga Co. at project "A New Nation Votes"
- Election result Assembly, Queens Co. at project "A New Nation Votes"
- Election result Assembly, Rensselaer Co. at project "A New Nation Votes"
- Election result Assembly, Richmond Co. at project "A New Nation Votes"
- Election result Assembly, Rockland Co. at project "A New Nation Votes"
- Election result Assembly, Schoharie Co. at project "A New Nation Votes"
- Election result Assembly, Saratoga Co. at project "A New Nation Votes"
- Election result Assembly, Suffolk Co. at project "A New Nation Votes"
- Election result Assembly, Tioga Co. at project "A New Nation Votes"
- Election result Assembly, Ulster Co. at project "A New Nation Votes"
- Election result Assembly, Westchester Co. at project "A New Nation Votes"
- Election result Senate, Southern D. at project "A New Nation Votes"
- Election result Senate, Middle D. at project "A New Nation Votes"
- Election result Senate, Eastern D. at project "A New Nation Votes"
- Election result Senate, Western D. at project "A New Nation Votes"
