= 25th New York State Legislature =

New York state legislative session

←	24th	26th	→
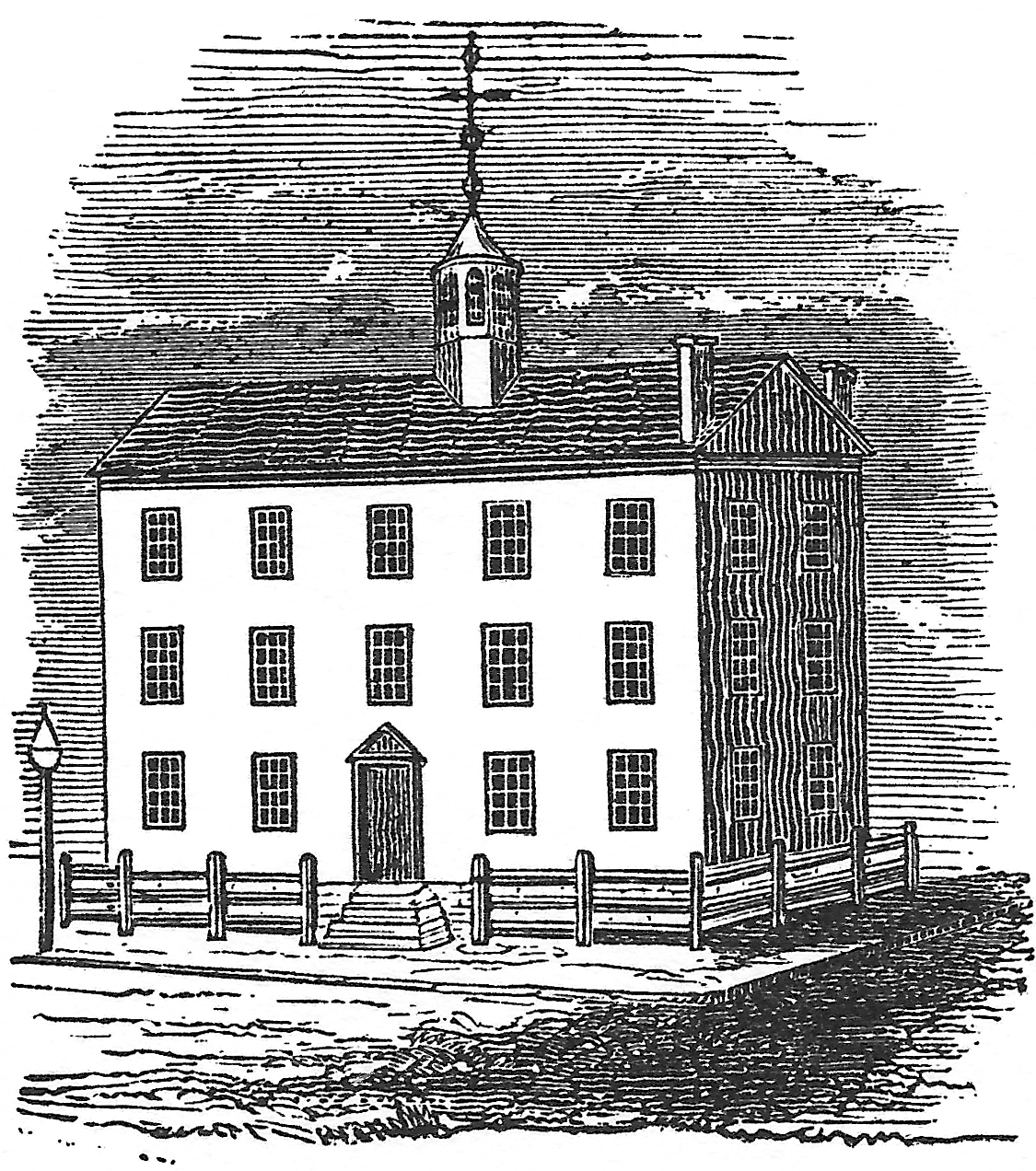
- The Old Albany City Hall (undated)

Overview
- Legislative body: New York State Legislature
- Jurisdiction: New York, United States
- Term: July 1, 1801 – June 30, 1802

Senate
- Members: 43
- President: Lt. Gov. Jeremiah Van Rensselaer (Dem.-Rep.)
- Party control: Federalist (22-19)

Assembly
- Members: 108
- Speaker: Thomas Storm (Dem.-Rep.)
- Party control: Democratic-Republican

Sessions
- 1st: January 26 – April 5, 1802

The 25th New York State Legislature, consisting of the New York State Senate and the New York State Assembly, met from January 26 to April 5, 1802, during the first year of George Clinton's second tenure as Governor of New York, in Albany.

== Background ==
Under the provisions of the New York Constitution of 1777, amended by the re-apportionment of March 4, 1796, Senators were elected on general tickets in the senatorial districts for four-year terms. They were divided into four classes, and every year about one fourth of the Senate seats came up for election. Assemblymen were elected countywide on general tickets to a one-year term, the whole assembly being renewed annually.

In 1797, Albany was declared the State capital, and all subsequent legislatures have been meeting there ever since. In 1799, the legislature enacted that future legislatures meet on the last Tuesday of January of each year unless called earlier by the governor.

On November 11, 1801, State Senator Moses Vail was appointed Sheriff of Rensselaer County, leaving a vacancy in the Eastern District.

At this time the politicians were divided into two opposing political parties: the Federalists and the Democratic-Republicans.

== Elections ==
The State election was held from April 28 to 30, 1801. Ex-Governor George Clinton (in office 1777-1795) was elected to a seventh term, and Jeremiah Van Rensselaer was elected Lieutenant Governor of New York, both were Democratic-Republicans

Senators Ezra L'Hommedieu (Southern D.), Jacobus S. Bruyn, James G. Graham (both Middle D.), Ebenezer Clark, Jacobus Van Schoonhoven and Abraham Van Vechten (all three Eastern D.) were re-elected. Peter A. Van Bergen (Middle D.), Christopher Hutton (Eastern D.), John Meyer, Isaac Foote (both Western D.) and Assemblyman Lemuel Chipman (Western D.) were also elected to the Senate. Assemblyman Edward Savage (Eastern D.) was elected to fill the vacancy. L'Hommedieu, Bruyn, Graham, Van Bergen and Savage were Democratic-Republicans, Hutton ran on both tickets, the others were Federalists.

== Constitutional Convention ==
On April 6, 1801, the legislature had passed an "Act Recommending a Convention" which called for the election of delegates to a convention to amend the State Constitution concerning the right to nominate appointees in the Council of Appointment, and the apportionment of the state legislature. The delegates were elected from August 25 to 27, mirroring the apportionment of the Assembly. The convention met from October 13 to 27, and had a large Democratic-Republican majority. U.S. Vice President Aaron Burr presided.

The Constitutional Convention gave the governor and all four councillors concurrently the right to nominate appointees. The convention also changed the composition of the state legislature: the number of state senators was fixed permanently at 32; the number of assemblymen was set at 100, but could increase at a rate of two per year until reaching 150.

== Sessions ==
The legislature met at the Old City Hall in Albany on January 26, 1802; and adjourned on April 5.

Dem.-Rep. Thomas Storm was elected Speaker unanimously.

On February 5, 1802, U.S. Senator John Armstrong (Dem.-Rep.) resigned, and on February 9, 1802, the Legislature elected State Senator DeWitt Clinton (Dem.-Rep.) to fill the vacancy.

On March 31, 1802, the Legislature re-apportioned the Assembly seats, according to the provisions of the Constitutional Convention.

== State Senate ==
=== Districts ===
- The Southern District (9 seats) consisted of Kings, New York, Queens, Richmond, Suffolk and Westchester counties.
- The Middle District (12 seats) consisted of Dutchess, Orange, Ulster, Columbia, Delaware, Rockland and Greene counties.
- The Eastern District (12 seats) consisted of Washington, Clinton, Rensselaer, Albany, Saratoga and Essex counties.
- The Western District (11 seats) consisted of Montgomery, Herkimer, Ontario, Otsego, Tioga, Onondaga, Schoharie, Steuben, Chenango, Oneida and Cayuga counties.
Note: There are now 62 counties in the State of New York. The counties which are not mentioned in this list had not yet been established, or sufficiently organized, the area being included in one or more of the abovementioned counties.

=== Members ===
The asterisk (*) denotes members of the previous Legislature who continued in office as members of this Legislature. Edward Savage and Lemuel Chipman changed from the Assembly to the Senate.

To reduce the number of senators from 43 to 32, as enacted by the Constitutional Convention, 19 members left the Senate at the end of this session: the eleven members who finished their term this year (marked "term left 1 year"); and eight senators who had their term cut short (marked "legislated out of office"). Eight new senators were elected to arrive at 32.

District	Senators	Term left	Party	Notes
Southern	DeWitt Clinton*	1 year	Dem.-Rep.	elected on February 9, 1802, to the U.S. Senate, and took his seat on February 27, thus vacating his seat in the State Senate
Southern	(David Gelston*)	1 year	Dem.-Rep.	vacated his seat upon appointment as Collector of the Port of New York on July 9, 1801
Southern	John Schenck*	1 year	Dem.-Rep.	
Southern	John B. Coles*	2 years	Federalist	legislated out of office
Southern	Richard Hatfield*	2 years	Federalist	
Southern	William Denning*	3 years	Dem.-Rep.	
Southern	Benjamin Huntting*	3 years	Dem.-Rep.	elected to the Council of Appointment
Southern	Ebenezer Purdy*	3 years	Dem.-Rep.	
Southern	Ezra L'Hommedieu*	4 years	Dem.-Rep.	
Middle	Ebenezer Foote*	1 year	Federalist	
Middle	Ambrose Spencer*	1 year	Dem.-Rep.	from February 3, 1802, also New York Attorney General
Middle	Isaac Bloom*	2 years	Dem.-Rep.	elected in April 1802 to the 8th United States Congress; legislated out of office
Middle	John Hathorn*	2 years	Dem.-Rep.	
Middle	John Suffern*	2 years	Dem.-Rep.	
Middle	John C. Hogeboom*	3 years	Dem.-Rep.	
Middle	Solomon Sutherland*	3 years	Dem.-Rep.	legislated out of office
Middle	David Van Ness*	3 years	Dem.-Rep.	legislated out of office
Middle	James W. Wilkin*	3 years	Dem.-Rep.	elected to the Council of Appointment
Middle	Jacobus S. Bruyn*	4 years	Dem.-Rep.	
Middle	Peter A. Van Bergen	4 years	Dem.-Rep.	
Middle	James G. Graham*	4 years	Dem.-Rep.	legislated out of office
Eastern	Leonard Gansevoort*	1 year	Federalist	
Eastern	John Sanders*	1 year	Federalist	
Eastern	Zina Hitchcock*	2 years	Federalist	
Eastern	Ebenezer Russell*	2 years	Federalist	
Eastern	Edward Savage*	2 years	Dem.-Rep.	elected to fill vacancy, in place of Moses Vail; elected to the Council of Appointment
Eastern	James Gordon*	3 years	Federalist	
Eastern	Stephen Lush	3 years	Federalist	legislated out of office
Eastern	Ebenezer Clark*	4 years	Federalist	legislated out of office
Eastern	Christopher Hutton	4 years	Dem.-Rep./Fed.	Hutton ran on both tickets
Eastern	Jacobus Van Schoonhoven*	4 years	Federalist	
Eastern	Abraham Van Vechten*	4 years	Federalist	also Recorder of the City of Albany
Western	William Beekman*	1 year	Federalist	
Western	John Frey*	1 year	Federalist	
Western	Frederick Gettman*	1 year	Federalist	
Western	Thomas R. Gold*	1 year	Federalist	
Western	Vincent Mathews*	2 years	Federalist	
Western	Moss Kent*	2 years	Federalist	
Western	Robert Roseboom*	3 years	Dem.-Rep.	
Western	Jedediah Sanger*	3 years	Federalist	also First Judge of the Oneida County Court
Western	Lemuel Chipman*	4 years	Federalist	elected to the Council of Appointment
Western	John Meyer	4 years	Federalist	also First Judge of the Herkimer County Court; legislated out of office
Western	Isaac Foote	4 years	Federalist	

=== Employees ===
- Clerk: Abraham B. Bancker
  - Henry I. Bleecker from April 5, 1802

== State Assembly ==
=== Districts ===
- Albany County (8 seats)
- Cayuga County (1 seat)
- Chenango County (2 seats)
- Clinton and Essex counties (1 seat)
- Columbia County (6 seats)
- Delaware County (2 seats)
- Dutchess County (10 seats)
- Greene County (2 seats)
- Herkimer County (3 seats)
- Kings County (1 seat)
- Montgomery County (6 seats)
- The City and County of New York (13 seats)
- Oneida County (3 seats)
- Onondaga County (1 seat)
- Ontario and Steuben counties (2 seats)
- Orange County (5 seats)
- Otsego County (4 seats)
- Queens County (4 seats)
- Rensselaer County (6 seats)
- Richmond County (1 seat)
- Rockland County (1 seat)
- Saratoga County (5 seats)
- Schoharie County (1 seat)
- Suffolk County (4 seats)
- Tioga County (1 seat)
- Ulster County (4 seats)
- Washington County (6 seats)
- Westchester County (5 seats)
Note: There are now 62 counties in the State of New York. The counties which are not mentioned in this list had not yet been established, or sufficiently organized, the area being included in one or more of the abovementioned counties.

=== Assemblymen ===
The asterisk (*) denotes members of the previous Legislature who continued as members of this Legislature.

District	Assemblymen	Party	Notes
Albany	Johann Jost Dietz*	Federalist	
Albany	Prince Doty*	Federalist	
Albany	John Vernon Henry*	Federalist	
Albany	Peter S. Schuyler	Federalist	
Albany	Joseph Shurtleff*	Federalist	
Albany	Dirck Ten Broeck*	Federalist	
Albany	Jacob Ten Eyck*	Federalist	
Albany	Peter West*	Federalist	
Cayuga	Salmon Buell		
Chenango	Nathaniel King		
Chenango	Joshua Mersereau Jr.		
Clinton and Essex	William Bailey		
Columbia	Thomas Brodhead	Federalist	
Columbia	Josiah Holley	Dem.-Rep.	
Columbia	Henry W. Livingston	Federalist	elected in April 1802 to the 8th United States Congress
Columbia	Samuel Ten Broeck	Dem.-Rep.	
Columbia	Peter Van Alstyne	Dem.-Rep.	
Columbia	Moses Younglove	Dem.-Rep.	
Delaware	Gabriel North*	Dem.-Rep.	
Delaware	Erastus Root*	Dem.-Rep.	elected in April 1802 to the 8th United States Congress
Dutchess	Abraham Adriance*	Dem.-Rep.	
Dutchess	Benjamin Akins*	Dem.-Rep.	
Dutchess	Theodorus Bailey	Dem.-Rep.	
Dutchess	Elisha Barlow*	Dem.-Rep.	
Dutchess	Nicholas H. Emigh*	Dem.-Rep.	
Dutchess	Harry Garrison	Dem.-Rep.	
Dutchess	Alexander Spencer	Dem.-Rep.	
Dutchess	John Thompson	Dem.-Rep.	
Dutchess	John M. Thurston*	Dem.-Rep.	
Dutchess	vacant		
Greene	William Beach		
Greene	Philip Conine Jr.		previously a member from Albany Co.
Herkimer	Nathan Smith*	Dem.-Rep.	
Herkimer	Samuel Merry Jr.	Dem.-Rep.	
Herkimer	George Widrig*	Dem.-Rep.	
Kings	John C. Vanderveer		
Montgomery	Archibald McIntyre*	Dem.-Rep.	
Montgomery	Frederick Sammons	Dem.-Rep.	
Montgomery	Alexander Sheldon*	Dem.-Rep.	
Montgomery	Jacob Snell*	Dem.-Rep.	
Montgomery	Charles Ward	Dem.-Rep.	
Montgomery	Christopher P. Yates*	Dem.-Rep.	
New York	Philip I. Arcularius*	Dem.-Rep.	
New York	John Broome*	Dem.-Rep.	
New York	Peter Elting	Dem.-Rep.	
New York	Thomas Farmar	Dem.-Rep.	
New York	William Few	Dem.-Rep.	
New York	James Hunt*	Dem.-Rep.	
New York	(Henry Brockholst Livingston*)	Dem.-Rep.	vacated his seat upon appointment to the New York Supreme Court on January 8, 1802
New York	Elias Nexsen*	Dem.-Rep.	
New York	Samuel Osgood*	Dem.-Rep.	
New York	Ezekiel Robins*	Dem.-Rep.	
New York	Henry Rutgers*	Dem.-Rep.	
New York	Thomas Storm*	Dem.-Rep.	elected Speaker
New York	George Warner*	Dem.-Rep.	
Oneida	Joel Bristol		
Oneida	Abel French*	Federalist	
Oneida	David Ostrom*	Federalist	
Onondaga	Asa Danforth*	Dem.-Rep.	
Ontario and Steuben	Daniel Chapin		
Ontario and Steuben	Peter B. Porter	Dem.-Rep.	
Orange	Joshua Brown		
Orange	James Burt	Dem.-Rep.	
Orange	Charles Clinton		
Orange	Andrew McCord*	Dem.-Rep.	elected in April 1802 to the 8th United States Congress
Orange	Selah Strong	Dem.-Rep.	
Otsego	Samuel Campbell		
Otsego	Solomon Martin*		
Otsego	Jedediah Peck*	Dem.-Rep.	
Otsego	Jacob Ten Broeck*		
Queens	John D. Ditmis	Dem.-Rep.	
Queens	Abraham Monfoort*	Dem.-Rep.	
Queens	Joseph Pettit*	Dem.-Rep.	
Queens	William Mott	Dem.-Rep.	
Rensselaer	John Carpenter	Federalist	
Rensselaer	Jacob A. Fort	Federalist	
Rensselaer	John Green	Fed./Dem.-Rep.	Green ran on both tickets
Rensselaer	Burton Hammond	Federalist	
Rensselaer	John Knickerbacker Jr.	Federalist	
Rensselaer	John Stevens	Federalist	
Richmond	Paul I. Micheau*	Federalist	
Rockland	Peter Denoyelles	Dem.-Rep.	
Saratoga	Samuel Clark		
Saratoga	Adam Comstock*	Dem.-Rep.	
Saratoga	Henry Corl Jr.*		
Saratoga	James Warren*		
Saratoga	Edward A. Watrous		
Schoharie	Lawrence Lawyer Jr.	Dem.-Rep.	
Suffolk	Israel Carll	Dem.-Rep.	
Suffolk	Jared Landon*	Dem.-Rep.	
Suffolk	Abraham Miller*	Dem.-Rep.	
Suffolk	Tredwell Scudder	Dem.-Rep.	
Tioga	Caleb Hyde		
Ulster	Benjamin Bevier*	Dem.-Rep.	
Ulster	Josiah Hasbrouck	Dem.-Rep.	
Ulster	Elnathan Sears	Dem.-Rep.	
Ulster	Benjamin Snyder	Dem.-Rep.	
Washington	Kitchel Bishop	Dem.-Rep.	
Washington	Alexander Cowan	Dem.-Rep.	
Washington	Jason Kellogg	Dem.-Rep.	
Washington	John McLean	Dem.-Rep.	
Washington	Micajah Pettit		
Washington	Isaac Sargent	Dem.-Rep.	
Westchester	Abijah Gilbert*	Dem.-Rep.	
Westchester	Abraham Odell*	Dem.-Rep.	
Westchester	Abel Smith*	Dem.-Rep.	
Westchester	Thomas Thomas*	Dem.-Rep.	
Westchester	Joseph Travis	Dem.-Rep.	

=== Employees ===
- Clerk: James Van Ingen
- Sergeant-at-Arms: Ephraim Hunt
- Doorkeeper: Benjamin Whipple

== Sources ==
- The New York Civil List compiled by Franklin Benjamin Hough (Weed, Parsons and Co., 1858) [see pg. 108f for Senate districts; pg. 118 for senators [lists incorrectly a total of 44 senators, Tayler was not elected]; pg. 148f for Assembly districts; pg. 175 for assemblymen; pg. 55f for constitutional convention]
- The History of Political Parties in the State of New-York, from the Ratification of the Federal Constitution to 1840 by Jabez D. Hammond (4th ed., Vol. 1, H. & E. Phinney, Cooperstown, 1846; pages 156ff)
- Election result Assembly, Albany Co. at project "A New Nation Votes", compiled by Phil Lampi, hosted by Tufts University Digital Library
- Election result Assembly, Columbia Co. at project "A New Nation Votes"
- Election result Assembly, Dutchess Co. at project "A New Nation Votes"
- Election result Assembly, Herkimer Co. at project "A New Nation Votes"
- Election result Assembly, Montgomery Co. at project "A New Nation Votes"
- Election result Assembly, Queens Co. at project "A New Nation Votes"
- Election result Assembly, Rensselaer Co. at project "A New Nation Votes"
- Election result Assembly, Tioga Co. at project "A New Nation Votes"
- Election result Assembly, Ulster Co. at project "A New Nation Votes"
- Election result Assembly, Suffolk Co. at project "A New Nation Votes"
- Election result Assembly, Westchester Co. at project "A New Nation Votes"
- Election result Senate, Southern D. at project "A New Nation Votes"
- Election result Senate, Middle D. at project "A New Nation Votes"
- Election result Senate, Eastern D. at project "A New Nation Votes" [This statement gives more votes for John Tayler than for Edward Savage, but the official result diverged, since Savage was elected to the Council of Appointment.]
- Election result Senate, Western D. at project "A New Nation Votes"
