= 28th New York State Legislature =

New York state legislative session

←	27th	29th	→
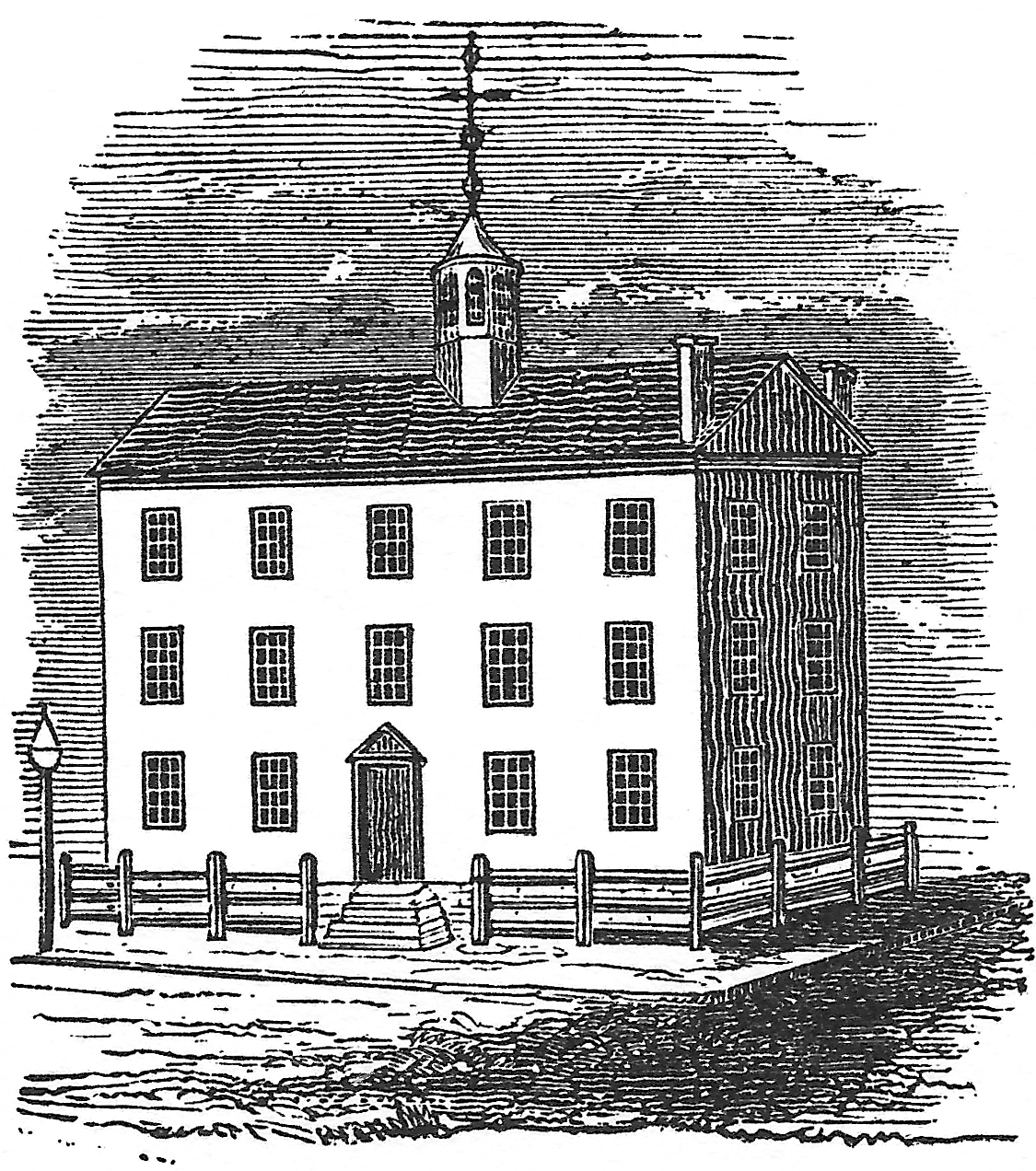
- The Old Albany City Hall (undated)

Overview
- Legislative body: New York State Legislature
- Jurisdiction: New York, United States
- Term: July 1, 1804 – June 30, 1805

Senate
- Members: 32
- President: Lt. Gov. John Broome (Dem.-Rep.)
- Party control: Democratic-Republican (26-4)

Assembly
- Members: 100
- Speaker: Alexander Sheldon (Dem.-Rep.)
- Party control: Democratic-Republican

Sessions
- 1st: November 6 – 12, 1804
- 2nd: January 23 – April 10, 1805

The 28th New York State Legislature, consisting of the New York State Senate and the New York State Assembly, met from November 6, 1804, to April 10, 1805, during the first year of Morgan Lewis's governorship, in Albany.

== Background ==
Under the provisions of the New York Constitution of 1777, amended by the Constitutional Convention of 1801, 32 Senators were elected on general tickets in the four senatorial districts for four-year terms. They were divided into four classes, and every year eight Senate seats came up for election. Assemblymen were elected countywide on general tickets to a one-year term, the whole assembly being renewed annually.

In 1797, Albany was declared the State capital, and all subsequent Legislatures have been meeting there ever since. In 1799, the Legislature enacted that future Legislatures meet on the last Tuesday of January of each year unless called earlier by the governor.

In 1804, Seneca County was split from Cayuga County, and was apportioned one seat in the Assembly, taken from Cayuga.

U.S. Senator John Armstrong resigned on June 30, 1804, after his appointment as U.S. Minister to France.

At this time the politicians were divided into two opposing political parties: the Federalists and the Democratic-Republicans. The Democratic-Republican Party was split into two opposing factions: the "Regulars" who supported Morgan Lewis, and the "Burrites" who supported Vice President Aaron Burr. Lewis, the Chief Justice of the New York Supreme Court, had been nominated for Governor by his party, but Burr, after being dropped from the presidential ticket in favor of Gov. George Clinton, ran against Lewis. Burr also received the support of the majority of the Federalists although his enemy Alexander Hamilton, the leader of the Federalists, advocated against it and supported Lewis.

== Elections ==
The State election was held from April 24 to 26, 1804. Morgan Lewis was elected Governor of New York, and State Senator John Broome was elected Lieutenant Governor of New York.

Senators William Denning and Ebenezer Purdy (both Southern D.) were re-elected. Samuel Brewster, Stephen Hogeboom (both Middle D.) and Henry Huntington (Western D.); and Assemblymen Thomas Thomas (Southern D.), Stephen Thorn (Eastern D.) and Jedediah Peck (Western D.) were also elected to Senate. All eight were "regular" Democratic-Republicans.

== Sessions ==
The Legislature met at the Old City Hall in Albany on November 6, 1804, to elect presidential electors; and adjourned on November 12.

Dem.-Rep. Alexander Sheldon was re-elected Speaker.

On November 9, 1804, the Legislature elected 19 presidential electors, all Democratic-Republicans: William Floyd, Sylvester Dering, James Fairlie, Cornelius Bergen, John Haring, Ezra Thompson, Major John Wood, Conrad E. Elmendorf, Stephen Miller, Albert Pawling, Isaac Sargent, Thomas Brooks, Matthias B. Hildreth, Jonas Earll, Sr., Joseph Ellicott, Henry Quackenbos, Adam Comstock, Abraham Bancker and ???. They cast their votes for Thomas Jefferson and George Clinton.

On November 9, 1804, the Legislature elected Samuel L. Mitchill (Dem.-Rep.) to succeed John Armstrong in the U.S. Senate.

The Legislature met for the regular session on January 23, 1805; and adjourned on April 10.

During this session the Merchant's Bank of New York was chartered. The bank had been founded by Federalists in competition to the Bank of the Manhattan Company which was run by Democratic-Republicans. The Democratic-Republican majority of the Assembly of 1804 had not only refused to grant a charter, but actually ordered the Merchant's Bank to shut down by May 1805. During this session, the bank bribed enough legislators to have the charter approved, although the Democratic-Republican leaders advocated strongly against it. Gov. Morgan Lewis, who had been Chief Justice and who was wealthy beyond corruptibility, spoke out in favor of granting the charter. This was resented by the party leaders DeWitt Clinton and Ambrose Spencer, and eventually led to a split of the party into "Lewisites" and "Clintonians".

== State Senate ==
=== Districts ===
- The Southern District (6 seats) consisted of Kings, New York, Queens, Richmond, Suffolk and Westchester counties.
- The Middle District (8 seats) consisted of Dutchess, Orange, Ulster, Columbia, Delaware, Rockland and Greene counties.
- The Eastern District (9 seats) consisted of Washington, Clinton, Rensselaer, Albany, Saratoga, Essex and Montgomery counties.
- The Western District (9 seats) consisted of Herkimer, Ontario, Otsego, Tioga, Onondaga, Schoharie, Steuben, Chenango, Oneida, Cayuga, Genesee and Seneca counties.
Note: There are now 62 counties in the State of New York. The counties which are not mentioned in this list had not yet been established, or sufficiently organized, the area being included in one or more of the abovementioned counties.

=== Members ===
The asterisk (*) denotes members of the previous Legislature who continued in office as members of this Legislature. Thomas Thomas, Stephen Thorn and Jedediah peck changed from the Assembly to the Senate.

District	Senators	Term left	Party	Notes
Southern	Ezra L'Hommedieu*	1 year	Dem.-Rep.	
Southern	John Schenck*	2 years	Dem.-Rep.	elected to the Council of Appointment
Southern	vacant	3 years		John Broome was elected Lieutenant Governor of New York
Southern	William Denning*	4 years	Dem.-Rep.	
Southern	Ebenezer Purdy*	4 years	Dem.-Rep.	
Southern	Thomas Thomas*	4 years	Dem.-Rep.	
Middle	Jacobus S. Bruyn*	1 year	Dem.-Rep.	
Middle	(Peter A. Van Bergen*)	1 year	Dem.-Rep.	died on August 30, 1804, before the Legislature met
Middle	Abraham Adriance*	2 years	Dem.-Rep.	
Middle	James Burt*	2 years	Dem.-Rep./Burrite	
Middle	Joshua H. Brett*	3 years	Dem.-Rep.	elected to the Council of Appointment
Middle	Robert Johnston*	3 years	Dem.-Rep.	
Middle	Samuel Brewster	4 years	Dem.-Rep.	
Middle	Stephen Hogeboom	4 years	Dem.-Rep.	
Eastern	Jacobus Van Schoonhoven*	1 year	Federalist	
Eastern	Abraham Van Vechten*	1 year	Federalist	also Recorder of the City of Albany
Eastern	Simon Veeder*	1 year	Dem.-Rep.	
Eastern	Jacob Snell*	2 years	Dem.-Rep.	
Eastern	Edward Savage*	3 years	Dem.-Rep.	
Eastern	John Tayler*	3 years	Dem.-Rep.	
Eastern	Thomas Tredwell*	3 years	Dem.-Rep.	
Eastern	John Woodworth*	3 years	Dem.-Rep.	also New York Attorney General
Eastern	Stephen Thorn*	4 years	Dem.-Rep.	elected to the Council of Appointment
Western	Lemuel Chipman*	1 year	Federalist	
Western	Isaac Foote*	1 year	Federalist	
Western	Joseph Annin*	2 years	Dem.-Rep./Burrite	
Western	Asa Danforth*	2 years	Dem.-Rep.	
Western	Matthias B. Tallmadge*	2 years	Dem.-Rep.	vacated his seat on June 12, 1805, upon appointment to the United States District Court for the District of New York
Western	George Tiffany*	2 years	Dem.-Rep.	
Western	Caleb Hyde*	3 years	Dem.-Rep.	
Western	Henry Huntington	4 years	Dem.-Rep.	
Western	Jedediah Peck*	4 years	Dem.-Rep.	elected to the Council of Appointment

=== Employees ===
- Clerk: Henry I. Bleecker

== State Assembly ==
=== Districts ===
- Albany County (6 seats)
- Cayuga County (2 seats)
- Chenango County (4 seats)
- Clinton County (1 seat)
- Columbia County (4 seats)
- Delaware County (2 seats)
- Dutchess County (7 seats)
- Essex County (1 seat)
- Genesee and Ontario counties (3 seats)
- Greene County (2 seats)
- Herkimer County (3 seats)
- Kings County (1 seat)
- Montgomery County (5 seats)
- The City and County of New York (9 seats)
- Oneida County (4 seats)
- Onondaga County (2 seats)
- Orange County (4 seats)
- Otsego County (4 seats)
- Queens County (3 seats)
- Rensselaer County (5 seats)
- Richmond County (1 seat)
- Rockland County (1 seat)
- Saratoga County (4 seats)
- Schoharie County (2 seats)
- Seneca County (1 seat)
- Steuben County (1 seat)
- Suffolk County (3 seats)
- Tioga County (1 seat)
- Ulster County (4 seats)
- Washington County (6 seats)
- Westchester County (4 seats)
Note: There are now 62 counties in the State of New York. The counties which are not mentioned in this list had not yet been established, or sufficiently organized, the area being included in one or more of the abovementioned counties.

=== Assemblymen ===
The asterisk (*) denotes members of the previous Legislature who continued as members of this Legislature.

District	Assemblymen	Party	Notes
Albany	David Burhans	Federalist	
Albany	Adam Dietz Jr.	Federalist	
Albany	Stephen Lush	Federalist	
Albany	Nicholas V. Mynderse	Federalist	
Albany	Joseph Shurtleff	Federalist	
Albany	Moses Smith*	Federalist	
Cayuga	John Grover Jr.	Dem.-Rep.	
Cayuga	Amos Rathbun*	Dem.-Rep.	
Chenango	Peter Betts		
Chenango	Obadiah German*	Dem.-Rep.	Majority Leader
Chenango	Samuel Payne		
Chenango	Luther Waterman		
Clinton	Benjamin Mooers*	Dem.-Rep.	
Columbia	Moncrief Livingston	Federalist	
Columbia	Peter Silvester	Federalist	
Columbia	William W. Van Ness	Federalist	Minority Leader
Columbia	Jason Warner	Federalist	
Delaware	Adam I. Doll	Federalist	
Delaware	Anthony Marvine	Federalist	
Dutchess	Job Crawford	Dem.-Rep.	
Dutchess	Isaac Hunting	Dem.-Rep.	
Dutchess	John Patterson	Dem.-Rep.	
Dutchess	Abraham H. Schenck	Dem.-Rep.	
Dutchess	Isaac Sherwood	Dem.-Rep.	
Dutchess	John Van Benthuysen	Dem.-Rep.	
Dutchess	John M. Thurston	Dem.-Rep.	
Essex	Theodorus Ross*	Dem.-Rep.	
Genesee and Ontario	Amos Hall*		
Genesee and Ontario	Daniel W. Lewis	Federalist	
Genesee and Ontario	Alexander Rea	Dem.-Rep.	
Greene	Patrick Hamilton		
Greene	Daniel Sayre		
Herkimer	Evans Wharry*	Dem.-Rep.	
Herkimer	George Widrig*	Dem.-Rep.	
Herkimer	Samuel Wright*	Dem.-Rep.	
Kings	John Hicks*	Dem.-Rep.	
Montgomery	Jonathan Hallett	Dem.-Rep.	
Montgomery	James McIntyre	Dem.-Rep.	
Montgomery	John Seeber	Dem.-Rep.	
Montgomery	Alexander Sheldon*	Dem.-Rep.	elected Speaker
Montgomery	David J. Zeilly*	Dem.-Rep.	
New York	Philip I. Arcularius	Dem.-Rep.	
New York	John Bingham	Dem.-Rep.	
New York	George Clinton, Jr.*	Dem.-Rep.	elected in a special election to the 8th United States Congress, and took his seat on February 14, 1805, vacating his seat in the Assembly
New York	Thomas Farmar	Dem.-Rep.	
New York	William Few*	Dem.-Rep.	
New York	William W. Gilbert	Dem.-Rep.	
New York	Henry Rutgers*	Dem.-Rep.	
New York	Peter A. Schenck*		
New York	Solomon Townsend*		
Oneida	George Brayton	Dem.-Rep.	
Oneida	Joseph Jennings		
Oneida	Joseph Kirkland*	Federalist	
Oneida	Benjamin Wright		Benjamin Wright and Walter Martin received an equal number of votes, which meant "no choice", but Wright was seated by a resolution of the Assembly on November 7, 1804
Onondaga	John Ballard	Dem.-Rep.	
Onondaga	William I. Vredenbergh	Dem.-Rep.	
Orange	John Barber		
Orange	Joshua Brown*		
Orange	John Hathorn	Dem.-Rep.	
Orange	John Tuthill		
Otsego	Gurdon Huntington	Dem.-Rep.	
Otsego	William Lathrop		
Otsego	Luke Metcalfe		
Otsego	Humphrey Palmer		
Queens	Stephen Carman*	Federalist	
Queens	Benjamin Coe	Federalist	
Queens	Henry O. Seaman	Dem.-Rep.	
Rensselaer	Jonathan Burr	Dem.-Rep.	
Rensselaer	James L. Hogeboom	Dem.-Rep.	from March 19, 1805, also First Judge of the Rensselaer County Court
Rensselaer	Nehemiah King	Dem.-Rep.	
Rensselaer	Asa Mann*	Dem.-Rep.	
Rensselaer	John Ryan	Dem.-Rep.	
Richmond	John Dunn	Federalist	
Rockland	John Cole		
Saratoga	William Carpenter		
Saratoga	Samuel Clark		
Saratoga	Asahel Porter	Federalist	
Saratoga	David Rogers	Dem.-Rep.	
Schoharie	Henry Becker*	Dem.-Rep.	
Schoharie	Freegift Patchin*	Dem.-Rep.	
Seneca	John Sayre		
Steuben	John Wilson	Dem.-Rep.	
Suffolk	Israel Carll*	Dem.-Rep.	
Suffolk	Jonathan Dayton	Dem.-Rep.	
Suffolk	Jared Landon	Dem.-Rep.	
Tioga	John Miller	Dem.-Rep.	
Ulster	Lucas Elmendorf*	Dem.-Rep.	
Ulster	Henry Reynolds	Dem.-Rep.	
Ulster	James Ross*	Dem.-Rep.	
Ulster	Selah Tuthill	Dem.-Rep.	
Washington	Isaac Harlow		
Washington	Jason Kellogg	Dem.-Rep.	
Washington	William Livingston*		
Washington	John McLean*	Dem.-Rep.	
Washington	Solomon Smith		
Washington	James Starbuck		
Westchester	Abijah Gilbert*	Dem.-Rep.	
Westchester	Abraham Odell*	Dem.-Rep.	
Westchester	Caleb Tompkins	Dem.-Rep.	
Westchester	Joseph Travis*	Dem.-Rep.	

=== Employees ===
- Clerk: Solomon Southwick
- Sergeant-at-Arms: Benjamin Haight
- Doorkeeper: Benjamin Whipple

== Sources ==
- The New York Civil List compiled by Franklin Benjamin Hough (Weed, Parsons and Co., 1858) [see pg. 108f for Senate districts; pg. 119 for senators; pg. 148f for Assembly districts; pg. 178 for assemblymen; pg. 320 and 324 for presidential election]
- The History of Political Parties in the State of New-York, from the Ratification of the Federal Constitution to 1840 by Jabez D. Hammond (4th ed., Vol. 1, H. & E. Phinney, Cooperstown, 1846; pages 202-221)
- Election result Assembly, Albany Co. at project "A New Nation Votes", compiled by Phil Lampi, hosted by Tufts University Digital Library
- Election result Assembly, Clinton Co. at project "A New Nation Votes"
- Election result Assembly, Delaware Co. at project "A New Nation Votes"
- Election result Assembly, Dutchess Co. at project "A New Nation Votes"
- Election result Assembly, Essex Co. at project "A New Nation Votes"
- Election result Assembly, Herkimer Co. at project "A New Nation Votes"
- Election result Assembly, Kings Co. at project "A New Nation Votes" [gives wrong result]
- Election result Assembly, Montgomery Co. at project "A New Nation Votes"
- Election result Assembly, Onondaga Co. at project "A New Nation Votes"
- Election result Assembly, Orange Co. at project "A New Nation Votes"
- Election result Assembly, Queens Co. at project "A New Nation Votes"
- Election result Assembly, Rensselaer Co. at project "A New Nation Votes" [gives wrong first name "John" instead of "James" L. Hogeboom]
- Election result Assembly, Saratoga Co. at project "A New Nation Votes"
- Election result Assembly, Ulster Co. at project "A New Nation Votes"
- Partial election result Senate, Southern D. at project "A New Nation Votes" [gives only votes from Richmond, Kings and Suffolk counties]
- Partial election result Senate, Middle D. at project "A New Nation Votes" [gives only votes from Delaware, Dutchess, Orange and Ulster counties]
- Partial election result Senate, Eastern D. at project "A New Nation Votes" [omits votes from Washington Co.]
- Partial election result Senate, Western D. at project "A New Nation Votes" [gives only votes from Herkimer Co.]
