= November 1800 United States Senate special election in New York =

The second 1800 United States Senate special election in New York was held on November 6, 1800, by the New York State Legislature to elect a U.S. senator (Class 3) to represent the State of New York in the United States Senate.

== Background ==
Federalist Rufus King had been re-elected in 1795 to a second term in the U.S. Senate (1795–1801). On May 23, 1796, he resigned after having been appointed U.S. Minister to Great Britain. Federalist John Laurance was elected in November 1796 to fill the vacancy, took his seat on December 8, 1796, but resigned in August 1800.

At the state election in April 1800, a Democratic-Republican majority of 28 was elected to the assembly, but the Senate had a majority of 7 Federalists. The 24th New York State Legislature met from November 4 to 7, 1800; and from January 27 to April 8, 1801, at Albany, New York.

== Candidates ==
Ex-Secretary of the Commonwealth of Pennsylvania (1783–1788) John Armstrong, a brother-in-law of Chancellor Robert R. Livingston, was the candidate of the Democratic-Republican Party. Armstrong had been a Federalist until about 1798, and appeared here as a compromise candidate, the two houses of the legislature having different majorities.

== Result ==
Armstrong was the choice of both the State Senate and the State Assembly, and was declared elected.

November 1800 United States Senator special election result
Office	House	Democratic-Republican		Democratic-Republican	
U.S. Senator	State Senate (43 members)	John Armstrong	unan.		
	State Assembly (107 members)	John Armstrong	99	Peter Gansevoort	2

Obs.: Armstrong was elected unanimously in the Senate, but the exact number of votes given is unclear.

== Aftermath ==
Armstrong took his seat on January 8, 1801, and was re-elected to a full term (1801–07) three weeks later.

== Sources ==
- The New York Civil List compiled in 1858 (see: pg. 62f for U.S. Senators; pg. 117f for state senators 1800–01; page 174 for Members of Assembly 1800–01) [gives name as "Lawrence"]
- Members of the Fourth United States Congress
- Members of the Sixth United States Congress
- History of Political Parties in the State of New-York by Jabez Delano Hammond (pages 153f) [gives name as "Lawrence"]
- Election result at Tufts University Library project "A New Nation Votes"
