= Vincent Mathews =

American politician

Vincent Mathews (June 29, 1766 – August 23, 1846) was a United States representative from New York. He was born at "Matthew's Field," in Blooming Grove, New York in Orange County in the village founded by his grandfather of the same name. He had two uncles who were supportive of the British efforts during the American Revolutionary War, David Mathews, the Loyalist Mayor of New York City, and his brother Fletcher. Mathews' father James was arrested along with David and Fletcher in a suspected attempt to kidnap George Washington, known as the Hickey Plot.

Mathews pursued an academic course in Noah Webster's school at Goshen and at the academy at Hackensack, New Jersey. He studied law in New York City, was admitted to the bar in 1790 and commenced practice in Elmira.

Mathews was a member of the New York State Assembly (Tioga Co.) in 1794 and 1795; and of the New York State Senate (Western D.) from 1796 to 1803, sitting in the 20th, 21st, 22nd, 23rd, 24th, 25th and 26th New York State Legislatures.

He was bounty land claims commissioner in 1798 and served as Cavalry commander and brigadier general in the New York militia. He was elected as a Federalist to the 11th United States Congress, holding office from March 4, 1809, to March 3, 1811. Mathews was district attorney for the seventh district of New York from 1813 to 1815 and moved to Bath, and in 1821 to Rochester.

He was again a member of the State Assembly (Monroe Co.) in 1826, and was district attorney of Monroe County in 1831. He resumed the practice of law in Rochester, where he died in 1846; he was buried in Mount Hope Cemetery.

U.S. House of Representatives
Preceded by John Russell	Member of the U.S. House of Representatives from New York's 14th congressional district 1809–1811	Succeeded by Daniel Avery
