= Samuel S. Lush =

American politician

Samuel Stringer Lush (1783 – June 21, 1841) was an American lawyer and politician from Albany, New York.

He was the son of Stephen Lush, a veteran of the American Revolutionary War who was also a lawyer and member of the New York Legislature. Samuel Lush graduated from Union College. He served as the district attorney of the district encompassing Albany from 1813 to 1818. He was elected to the New York Assembly in 1825, 1826, and 1830.

He married a great-granddaughter of Robert Livingston the Younger in 1814.
