= Archibald McIntyre =

American politician

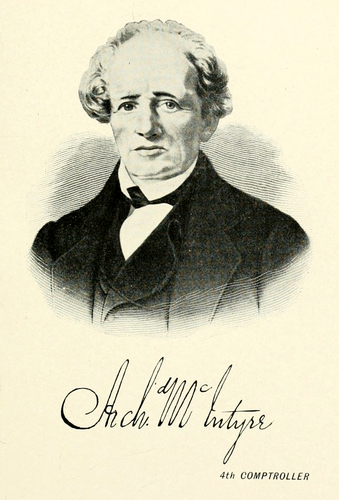
Archibald McIntyre

Archibald McIntyre (June 1, 1772 Dull, Kenmore, Perthshire, Scotland – May 6, 1858 Albany, Albany County, New York), was an American merchant and politician.

== Life ==
He was the son of Daniel McIntyre and Ann (Walker) McIntyre of the village of Dull, Kenmore, in the Breadalbane region of Perthshire, Scotland. The family emigrated to New York in 1774, settling in Broadalbin, named after their home in Scotland.

He was a member of the New York State Assembly from Montgomery County in 1798–99, 1800, 1800–01, 1802, 1804, 1812 and 1820–21 and was Deputy Secretary of State from 1801 to 1806. He was New York State Comptroller from 1806 to 1821.

He was member of the New York State Senate from the Middle District in 1822, and from the Fourth District from 1823 to 1826; sitting in the 45th, 46th, 47th, 48th and 49th New York State Legislatures.

He was a presidential elector in 1828 and 1840.

In partnership with his son-in-law David Henderson, he ran iron ore mines in and around North Elba, New York, including the North Elba Ironworks, the McIntyre Mine and the Adirondack Iron Company. He was also involved in the early development of Jersey City, New Jersey. In the 1840s, with his nephew, Archibald Robertson, and his great nephew, Peter Thompson, he initiated coal mining in Lycoming County, Pennsylvania.

From 1821 to 1834, he and his partner Henry Yates (brother of Governor Joseph C. Yates) operated the lotteries in New York and other states. Among others, they sold tickets for the Union College lottery, which led to a controversy that was settled only in 1854.

In 1836, he was president of the New York State Agricultural Society.

On May 20, 1842, the Ithaca and Owego Railroad was sold at a public sale of the Comptroller in Albany to Henry Yates and Archibald McIntyre for the sum of $4,500, an additional sum of $13,500 being paid for the equipment. Yates and McIntyre then reorganized the road on April 13, 1843, under the name of Cayuga and Susquehanna Railroad Co. In 1849, they sold it to the Leggett's Gap Railroad, and it became later part of the Delaware, Lackawanna and Western Railroad.

He was buried at the Albany Rural Cemetery in Menands, New York, of which he was one of the first trustees.

The MacIntyre Mountains in the Adirondacks are named after him.

== Sources ==
- Political Graveyard
- Google Books The New York Civil List compiled by Franklin Benjamin Hough (Weed, Parsons and Co., 1858)
- Notable people's bios, at Albany Rural Cemetery
- The controversy about the lottery proceeds for Union College, Dr. Nott and Yates & McIntyre.
- Yates and McIntyre: Lottery Managers by Hugh G. J. Aitken, in The Journal of Economic History, Vol. 13, No. 1 (Winter, 1953), pp. 36–57
- Early railroad history
- Death notice, in NYT on May 7, 1858
- History of Political Parties in the State of New-York (states that the state senator elected in 1822 was "not the late comptroller")
- The MacIntyre, McIntyre and McIntire Clan of Scotland, Ireland, Canada, and New England compiled by Robert Harry McIntire (1949)
- Death of Archibald McIntyre in The Living Age (page 562) [says that he was indeed a Senator from 1822 to 1826]

Political offices
Preceded by Elisha Jenkins	New York State Comptroller; 1806–1821	Succeeded by John Savage
New York State Senate
Preceded by new district	New York State Senate; Fourth District (Class 4); 1823–1826	Succeeded by Duncan McMartin Jr.
