= November 1804 United States Senate special election in New York =

The second 1804 United States Senate special election in New York was held on November 9, 1804, by the New York State Legislature to elect a U.S. senator (Class 1) to represent the State of New York in the United States Senate.

== Background ==
John Armstrong had been elected for this seat (term 1803–1809) in February 1804, after the resignation of Theodorus Bailey. Armstrong took his seat on February 25, but resigned on June 30, 1804, after his appointment as U.S. Minister to France.

At the State election in April 1804, the Democratic-Republican Party won a large majority in the Assembly, and all 8 State Senate seats up for election. The 28th New York State Legislature met from November 6 to 12, 1804; and from January 23 to April 10, 1805, at Albany, New York.

== Candidates ==
Congressman Dr. Samuel L. Mitchill was the candidate of the Democratic-Republican Party.

Ex-U.S. Senator Rufus King was the candidate of the Federalist Party.

== Result ==
Mitchill was elected.

November 1804 United States Senator special election result
Office	House	Democratic-Republican		Federalist		Democratic-Republican	
U.S. Senator	State Senate (30 members)	Samuel L. Mitchill					
	State Assembly (100 members)	Samuel L. Mitchill	75	Rufus King	14	David Thomas	1

Mitchill took his seat on November 23, 1804, and served until the end of the term on March 3, 1809.

== Sources ==
- The New York Civil List compiled in 1858 (see: pg. 63 for U.S. Senators; pg. 119 for State Senators 1804–05; pg. 178 for Members of Assembly 1804–05)
- Members of the 8th United States Congress
- History of Political Parties in the State of New-York by Jabez Delano Hammond (pages 215f) [gives date of election "2d February"]
- Election result at Tufts University Library project "A New Nation Votes"
