= Robert McClellan (state treasurer) =

Robert McClellan (January 1747 County Londonderry, Ireland – October 8, 1817 Albany, Albany County, New York) was an Irish-born American merchant and politician.

== Life ==
He was a son of Michael McClellan (d. ca. 1757) and Jane Henry McClellan. The family came to New England when Robert was still a child. His older brother took him to Albany, New York where he became a merchant. In 1771, Robert married Jane Williams in Albany, and they had nine children.

At the outbreak of the American Revolutionary War in 1775, he supported the revolutionary cause financially. In 1776, he became a member of the Albany Committee of Correspondence.

Beginning in 1780, he was elected to the Albany City Council, first as assistant, then as alderman. In 1798, he was appointed New York State Treasurer, a post he held until his resignation on January 31, 1803, after the discovery of a shortage of $33,000 in the Treasury accounts.

== Sources ==
- The New York Civil List compiled by Franklin Benjamin Hough (page 35; Weed, Parsons and Co., 1858) (Google Books) (name given as Robert McClallen)
- Bio at NYS Museum (name given as Robert Mc Clallan)
- Bio of his wife, at NYS Museum
- History of Political Parties in the State of New-York by John Stilwell Jenkins (pages 65 and 95f; Alden & Markham, Auburn NY, 1846) (name given as Robert McClellan, and Robert Mc Clellan)
- The Annals of Albany by Joel Munsell (giving name as Robert McClellan)

Political offices
Preceded by Gerard Bancker	New York State Treasurer; 1798–1803	Succeeded by Abraham G. Lansing
