= Abraham Van Vechten =

American politician

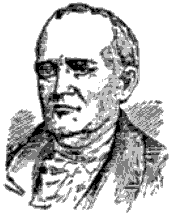

Member of the New York State Senate from the Middle District
- In office July 1, 1816 – June 30, 1819

New York State Attorney General
- In office February 13, 1813 – February 17, 1815
- Governor: Daniel D. Tompkins
- Preceded by: Thomas Addis Emmet
- Succeeded by: Martin Van Buren
- In office February 2, 1810 – February 1, 1811
- Governor: Daniel D. Tompkins
- Preceded by: Matthias B. Hildreth
- Succeeded by: Matthias B. Hildreth

Member of the New York State Assembly from Albany Co.
- In office July 1, 1805 – June 30, 1813

Member of the New York State Senate from the Eastern District
- In office July 1, 1798 – June 30, 1805

Personal details
- Born: December 5, 1762 Catskill, Albany County, New York
- Died: January 6, 1837 (aged 74) Albany, New York
- Party: Federalist
- Spouse: Catharina Schuyler (m. 1784; died 1820)
- Children: 13
- Parent(s): Teunis Van Vechten; Judikje Ten Broeck
- Education: Columbia College
- Profession: Lawyer, politician

Abraham Van Vechten (December 5, 1762 – January 6, 1837) was an American lawyer and a Federalist politician who served twice as New York State Attorney General.

== Early life ==
Abraham Van Vechten was born on December 5, 1762, in Catskill, Albany County (now Greene County), New York. He was the son of Dutch Americans Teunis Van Vechten (1707–1785) and Judikje "Judith" Ten Broeck (1721–1783).

His brothers were Samuel Ten Broeck Van Vechten (1742–1813) and Teunis Van Vechten (1749–1817), who became a prominent merchant in Albany and held the office of commissary on the staff of Governor Morgan Lewis during the revolution. Their maternal grandfather was Jacob Ten Broeck (1688–1746), nephew of Dirck Wesselse Ten Broeck (1638–1717). Van Vechten was educated at Columbia College, studied law with John Lansing Jr., and began practice in Johnstown, New York, but soon removed to Albany.

== Career ==
In 1792, he was elected one of the first directors of the Bank of Albany. From 1796 to 1797, he was Assistant Attorney General for the Fifth District, comprising Albany, Saratoga, Schoharie and Montgomery Counties. He was a Federalist presidential elector in 1796, and cast his votes for John Adams and Thomas Pinckney.

Van Vechten was the first lawyers admitted to the bar after the adoption of the New York State Constitution and ranked among the most gifted men of that time, including Alexander Hamilton, Aaron Burr and Robert Livingston.

== Public office ==
From 1797 to 1808, Van Vechten served as Recorder of the City of Albany. Concurrently, he was a member of the New York State Senate, serving in the 22nd, 23rd, 24th, 25th, 26th, 27th and 28th New York State Legislatures from 1798 to 1805, representing the Eastern District, which included Washington, Clinton, Rensselaer, Albany and Saratoga counties.

After leaving the Senate, he was elected to the New York State Assembly, serving in the 29th, 30th, 31st, 32nd, 33rd, 34th, 35th and 36th New York State Legislatures from 1808 to 1813, representing Albany County. While serving in the Assembly, he also served as the 10th New York State Attorney General from 1810 to 1811, and again from 1813 to 1815 as the 13th Attorney General, under Governor Daniel D. Tompkins. His successor was Martin Van Buren, who later became the 8th President of the United States.

After serving as Attorney General of New York, he was elected to return to the State Senate, serving in the 39th, 40th, 41st and 42nd New York State Legislatures from 1816 to 1819, representing the Middle District, which included Albany, Chenango, Columbia, Delaware, Greene, Orange, Otsego, Schoharie, Sullivan and Ulster counties.

In 1821, he was a delegate to the New York State Constitutional Convention, where he opposed the extension of the franchise. From 1797 to 1823, he was a regent of the University of the State of New York.

In the 1828 presidential election, Van Vechten was a presidential elector, voting for the 6th President, John Quincy Adams and Richard Rush.

== Personal life ==
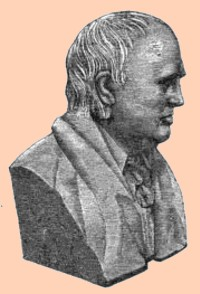
Copy of a likeness of a bust from Munsell's Annals of Albany

In 1784, he married Catharina Schuyler (1766–1820), eldest daughter of Philip P. Schuyler (1736–1808) of the prominent Schuyler family. She grew up on her father's farm in the Schuyler Flatts section of the Manor of Rensselaerswyck. Catharina was the great-granddaughter of Pieter Schuyler (1657–1724), the first mayor of Albany, and Maria Van Rensselaer, daughter of Jeremias Van Rensselaer (1632–1674). Together, they had thirteen children, including:

- Judith Van Vechten (1785–1799)
- Phillip Van Vechten (1786–1814)
- Teunis A Van Vechten (1787–1811)
- Anna Van Vechten (1789–1857)
- Elizabeth Van Vechten (1791–1878)
- Gertrude Van Vechten (b. 1793)
- Samuel Van Vechten (1794–1824)
- Hermanus Van Vechten (b. 1796)
- Gertrude Van Vechten (1798–1842)
- Judith Van Vechten (b. 1800)
- Jacob Ten Broeck Van Vechten (1801–1841)
- Judith Van Vechten (1803–1825)

Van Vechten died in Albany on January 6, 1837, and was buried at Albany Rural Cemetery.

== Sources ==
Legal offices
Preceded by Matthias B. Hildreth	New York State Attorney General; 1810–1811	Succeeded by Matthias B. Hildreth
Preceded by Thomas Addis Emmet	New York State Attorney General; 1813–1815	Succeeded by Martin Van Buren
