= Matthias B. Hildreth =

American politician

Matthias Bernard Hildreth (c. 1774 – July 11, 1812) was an American lawyer and politician.

== Life ==
Matthias B. Hildreth with his family moved in 1797 from Southampton, Long Island to Johnstown, then in Montgomery County, New York, where his father James Hildreth (d. 1818) became judge of the Court of Common Pleas.

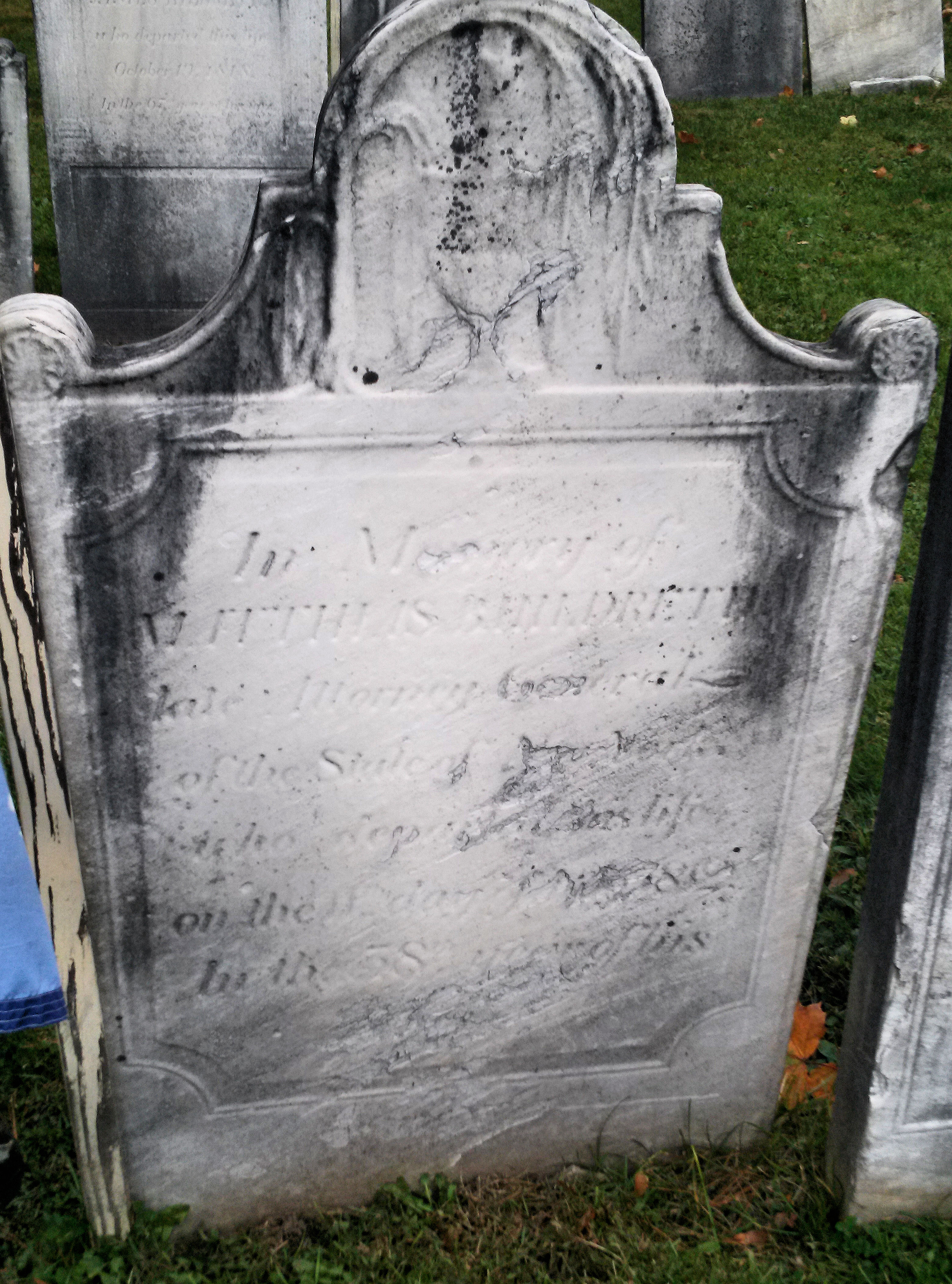
His tombstone

Hildreth was a presidential elector in 1804, voting for Thomas Jefferson and George Clinton. On March 13, 1808, he married Ann Rust (ca. 1769-1821), and they had two children: James Tallmage Hildreth (1809–1857) and Catherine Mary Hildreth.

He was New York State Attorney General from 1808 to 1810, and from 1811 until his death.

He was buried at the Old Colonial Cemetery at Johnstown, N.Y.

== Sources ==
- Info at rootsweb
- His son's obit in Iowa State Democrat, Davenport, Iowa
- Transcribed cemetery records

Legal offices
Preceded by John Woodworth	New York State Attorney General; 1808–1810	Succeeded by Abraham Van Vechten
Preceded by Abraham Van Vechten	New York State Attorney General; 1811–1812	Succeeded by Thomas Addis Emmet
