= Abraham Miller =

American politician

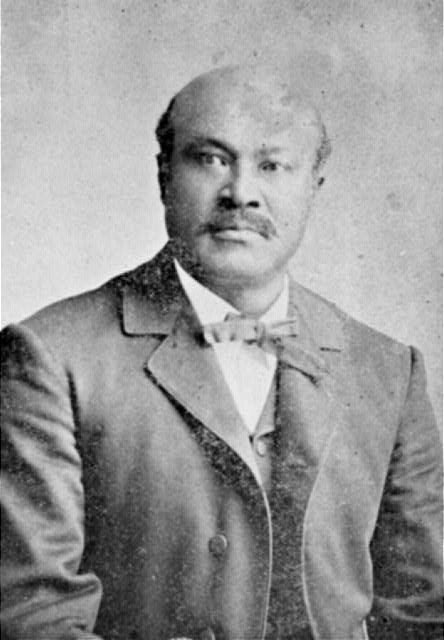

Arkansas State Representative
- In office 1874–1875
- Constituency: Phillips County, Arkansas

Personal details
- Born: March 13, 1851 Colt, Arkansas
- Died: July 8, 1913 (aged 62)
- Resting place: Magnolia Cemetery, Helena, Phillips County, Arkansas
- Party: Republican
- Spouse: Eliza Ann Ross Miller
- Occupation: Real estate entrepreneur; Baptist minister at Centennial Baptist Church, Roanoke Baptist Church in Hot Springs, Arkansas, and Pleasant Hill Baptist Church in Arkadelphia, Arkansas.

Abraham Hugo Miller (March 13, 1851 – July 8, 1913) was a businessman, pastor and state legislator in Arkansas. He served in the Arkansas House of Representatives in 1874 and 1875. At the peak of his business operations, he was considered the wealthiest man in Arkansas.

He was a pastor at Centennial Baptist Church in Helena, Arkansas. He and his wife were on the board of trustees at Arkansas Baptist College. He wrote an autobiography titled How I Succeeded in my Business.

== See also ==
- African American officeholders from the end of the Civil War until before 1900
