= E. C. Barlow =

American politician

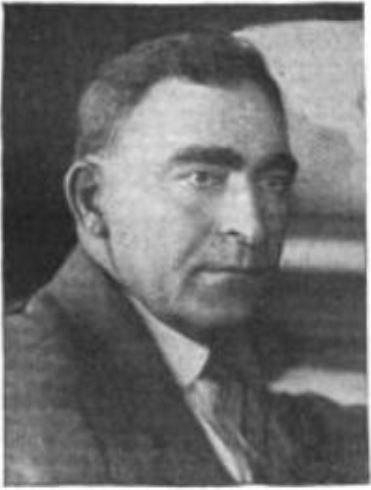
- c. 1927

Member of the Mississippi State Senate from the 8th district
- In office January 1928 – January 1932

Member of the Mississippi House of Representatives from the Lincoln County district
- In office January 1924 – January 1928

Personal details
- Born: October 9, 1888 Lincoln County, Mississippi, U.S.
- Died: November 27, 1957 (aged 69) Pike County, Mississippi, U.S.
- Party: Democratic

Elisha C. Barlow (October 9, 1888 - November 27, 1957) was an American lawyer and politician in Mississippi who represented Lincoln County in the Mississippi Legislature, serving in the Senate from 1928 to 1932 and in the House from 1924 to 1928. He was a district attorney from 1940 to 1948 and 1952 to 1956. He was a Democrat.

== Early life ==
Elisha C. Barlow was born on October 9, 1888, in Lincoln County, Mississippi. He had a brother, W. F. Barlow. He graduated from Cumberland University. He then taught in schools in his native Lincoln County. He then became a lawyer in Brookhaven, Mississippi.

== Political career ==
In 1923, Barlow was elected to represent Lincoln County as a Democrat in the Mississippi House of Representatives. He served this term from 1924 to 1928. In 1927, Barlow was elected to represent the 8th District in the Mississippi State Senate, and served one term from 1928 to 1932. During his term in the Senate, Barlow served in the Insurance; Labor; Judiciary "A"; and Roads, Ferries, and Bridges Committees. Barlow then served as a District Attorney of the 14th Circuit Court District, composing of Lincoln, Pike, Copiah, and Walthall Counties, from 1940 to 1948 and from 1952 to 1956.

=== Lamar Smith case ===
On August 13, 1955, black farmer, World War I veteran, and voting activist Lamar Smith was shot dead in the Brookhaven, Mississippi courthouse lawn. Despite the presence of a large number of people on the courthouse lawn, including the county sheriff, the three white suspects, including one who was covered in blood, were able to leave the lawn without incident. One of the suspects, a white farmer named Noah Smith, gave himself up to the police the following day after Barlow charged him with murder. In September 1955, the three suspects were heard before a grand jury composed of 20 white men. The "50 to 75" witnesses that testified before the jury denied seeing anything, and the grand jury declined to indict the suspects. Barlow criticized the failure of witnesses to cooperate as well as the sheriff's handling of the case, and promised to continue the investigation. Ultimately, the case was dismissed, and nobody was prosecuted for Smith's murder.

== Personal life and death ==
Barlow was a member of the Baptist Church. He was a member of the Woodmen of the World, the Odd Fellows, and the Maccabees. Barlow was married to the former Josie Smith. Their children included a son, named Charles Clayton Barlow, and a daughter, who was married to Carl Craig.

On the afternoon of November 28, 1957, Barlow was driving home after attending a Brookaven-McComb football game when he suddenly died of a heart attack. His eight-year-old grandson, a passenger, was able to safely drive the car to the side of the road near Summit, Mississippi. Barlow was survived by his wife, his son Charles, his daughter Mrs. Craig, his three grandchildren, and his brother W. F. On January 22, 1958, the Mississippi Legislature passed a resolution "commending [his] life of valuable public service and expressing sympathy to [his] family".
