= Matthias B. Tallmadge =

American judge

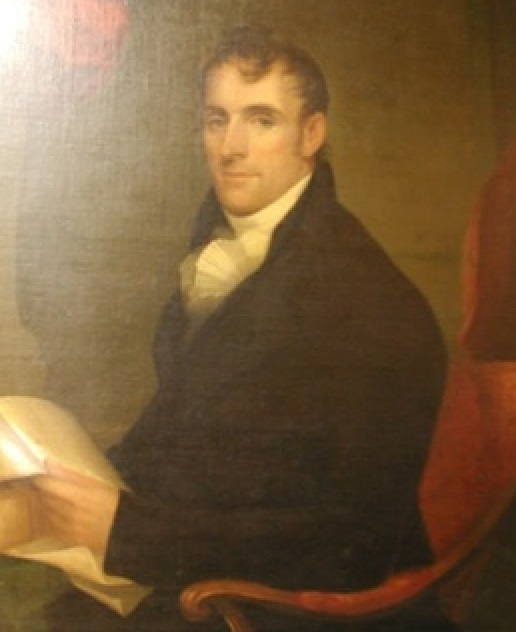
- 1810 portrait by Ezra Ames.

Judge of the United States District Court for the Northern District of New York
- In office April 9, 1814 – July 1, 1819
- Appointed by: operation of law
- Preceded by: Seat established by 3 Stat. 120
- Succeeded by: Roger Skinner

Judge of the United States District Court for the District of New York
- In office June 12, 1805 – April 9, 1814
- Appointed by: Thomas Jefferson
- Preceded by: John Sloss Hobart
- Succeeded by: Seat abolished

Personal details
- Born: Matthias Burnett Tallmadge; March 1, 1774 Stamford, Province of New York, British America
- Died: October 1, 1819 (aged 45) Poughkeepsie, New York
- Party: Democratic-Republican
- Spouse: Elizabeth "Eliza" Clinton (m. 1803–1819)
- Relations: James Tallmadge Jr. (brother); George Clinton (father in law)
- Children: 8
- Education: Yale University; Brown University
- Occupation: Attorney

Matthias Burnett Tallmadge (March 1, 1774 – October 1, 1819) was a member of the New York State Assembly and the New York State Senate and a United States district judge of the United States District Court for the District of New York and the United States District Court for the Northern District of New York.

== Early life ==
Tallmadge was born on March 1, 1774, in Stamford, Province of New York, British America, He was the son of Colonel James Tallmadge and Ann Sutherland Tallmadge. Among his siblings was James Tallmadge Jr., who later served as a member of the United States House of Representatives and Lieutenant Governor of New York.

Tallmadge graduated from Yale University in 1795 and received a master of arts degree from Brown University in 1798.

== Career ==
Tallmadge joined the militia in 1798 and served as adjutant of the regiment commanded by Theodorus Bailey. Tallmadge studied law with Ambrose Spencer, was admitted to the bar, and entered private practice in Herkimer, New York until 1805. He was town supervisor in 1801, and served in the New York State Senate (1803–1805).

=== Federal judicial service ===
Tallmadge received a recess appointment from President Thomas Jefferson on June 12, 1805, to a seat on the United States District Court for the District of New York vacated by Judge John Sloss Hobart. He was nominated to the same position by President Jefferson on December 20, 1805. He was confirmed by the United States Senate on December 23, 1805, and received his commission on January 17, 1806. Tallmadge was reassigned by operation of law to the United States District Court for the Northern District of New York on April 9, 1814, to a new seat authorized by 3 Stat. 120. His service terminated on July 1, 1819, due to his resignation.

=== Embezzlement investigation ===
In 1818, the clerk of William P. Van Ness' court, Theron Rudd, who had also worked for Tallmadge, was accused of embezzling more than $100,000 (about $1.6 million in 2019) intended to pay court judgments. Upon being discovered, Rudd fled with the money. He later returned to the United States and was prosecuted. He was sentenced to 10 years of hard labor, and the US government obtained a judgment against him, but he never paid it and the money was never recovered.

The investigation into Rudd's theft also considered the issue of Tallmadge's and Van Ness' culpability. Investigators later determined that while they might have been guilty of lax supervision, particularly Van Ness, since Tallmadge had been absent from court because of an extended illness, they were not involved in the theft and were not responsible for Rudd's actions.

=== Investigation into performance ===
Also in 1818, Congress appointed a special committee to look into the official conduct of Van Ness and Tallmadge, who apparently did not work well together. The friction between them was largely responsible for the split of New York's district court into southern and northern districts in 1814. While assigned to the northern district, Tallmadge's frequent ill health often required Van Ness to preside over both courts.

The investigation considered whether Van Ness and Tallmadge were failing to capably perform their duties. The committee determined in February 1819 that Tallmadge had not always held court for the northern district on the dates required by law, but that this was not an impeachable offense. The committee took no further action, and Tallmadge's continued illness caused him to resign in July 1819.

== Personal life ==
In 1803, Tallmadge married Elizabeth "Eliza" Clinton (1780–1825), who was a daughter of George Clinton, the longtime Governor of New York, and later Vice President. They were the parents of eight children: George Clinton; James S.; Charles William; Cornelia; Theodore Bailey; Rebecca; Mary E.; and Elizabeth.

Tallmadge died on October 1, 1819, in Poughkeepsie, New York.

== Sources ==
- "Guide to the Matthias B. Tallmadge Papers (1715–1868) MS 612". dlib.nyu.edu. New York University.

Legal offices
Preceded by John Sloss Hobart	Judge of the United States District Court for the District of New York; 1805–1814	Succeeded by Seat abolished
Preceded by Seat established by 3 Stat. 120	Judge of the United States District Court for the Northern District of New York; 1814–1819	Succeeded by Roger Skinner
