= Adam Comstock =

American politician

- Born: January 18, 1740; Smithfield, Rhode Island
- Died: April 10, 1819 (aged 79); Corinth, New York

Member of the New York State Assembly for Saratoga County
- In office July 1, 1792 – June 30, 1804
- Preceded by: Sidney Berry
- Succeeded by: William Carpenter

Member of the New York State Senate from the Eastern district
- In office July 1, 1805 – June 30, 1809
- Preceded by: Jacobus Van Schoonhoven; Abraham Van Vechten
- Succeeded by: John Stearns; Daniel Paris
- Lieutenant Colonel of 1st Rhode Island Regiment
- Allegiance: United States
- Branch: Continental Army
- Service years: 1776–1786
- Rank: Lieutenant colonel
- Unit: 1st Rhode Island Regiment
- Conflict: American Revolutionary War; Battle of Red Bank

Adam Comstock (January 18, 1740 – April 10, 1819) was an officer in the American Revolution, and a politician from New York.

Comstock was born on January 18, 1740, in Smithfield, Rhode Island. On April 10, 1763, he married Margaret MacGregor (September 8, 1745 – March 3, 1807) in Cranston, Rhode Island. They had ten children.

Adam Comstock enlisted in 1776 as a Major in Christopher Greene's Rhode Island Regiment and was later promoted to lieutenant colonel. At the Battle of Red Bank in New Jersey, he assumed command when the commanding officer was wounded and won the battle. He also served with Washington's army at Valley Forge.

After the Revolution Comstock moved with his family in 1786 to Corinth, New York and built the first frame house in the town. He was elected to the New York State Assembly from Saratoga County in 1791 and served twelve years. In 1805 he was elected to the New York State Senate and served for four years. He also served as justice of the peace, associate judge of the New York Court of Common Pleas, had a seat on the Council of Appointment, and served as a presidential elector.

Adam Comstock died on April 10, 1819, in South Corinth, New York and is buried in the Comstock Cemetery there.
