= Lemuel Chipman =

American politician (1754–1831)

Member of the New York Senate from the Western district
- In office January 26, 1802 – April 10, 1805
- Preceded by: various
- Succeeded by: various

Member of the New York State Assembly
- In office November 4, 1800 – April 8, 1801
- Constituency: Ontario and Steuben Counties
- In office November 1, 1796 – April 3, 1797
- Preceded by: Thomas Morris
- Succeeded by: Amos Hall
- Constituency: Ontario County

Member of the Vermont General Assembly for Pawlet
- In office October 14, 1790 – November 3, 1791
- In office 1783

Personal details
- Born: July 25, 1754 Salisbury, Connecticut
- Died: April 28, 1831 (aged 76) Richmond, New York
- Spouse: Asenath Chipman
- Children: 6

Military service
- Allegiance: Continental Army
- Battles/wars: American Revolutionary War

Lemuel Chipman (July 25, 1754 – April 28, 1831) was an American politician, judge, and physician. Chipman held political office in both the Republic of Vermont, the subsequent state of Vermont, and the state of New York. He served as a judge in both the states of Vermont and New York.

== Personal life ==
Chipman was born in Salisbury, Connecticut on July 25, 1754 . When he was nineteen, he and his family moved to Tinmouth, Vermont. He was the brother of noted Vermont politicians Nathaniel Chipman and Daniel Chipman. In adulthood, Chipman resided first in Pawlet, Vermont (within Rutland County) and later moved in 1795 to Ontario County, New York.

Chipman was an Episcopalian.

== Medical career and Revolutionary War service ==
Chipman became a physician and surgeon.

Chipman served in the Continental Army during the American Revolutionary War. He acted as assistant surgeon to Doctor Dickinson at the Battle of Bennington in 1777.

== Government and political career ==
=== Vermont ===
Chipman served multiple terms as a member of the Vermont General Assembly, representing the town of Pawlet. During his early tenure in the legislature, Chipman was a member of the State Convention of Vermont where the opted to support admittance as a state of the United States. During the 1793–1794 assembly, Chipman was chosen to serve as the body's clerk pro tempore.

In late 1793, Chipman was appointed an associate judge of Rutland County. Chipman served as a judge of Rutland County for eight years. On October 11, 1792, a petition sent by Matthew Lyon was received by Council of Censors calling for Judge Chipman to be impeached for maladministration. However, on October 13, 1792, the Council dismissed this petition, judging it to be a matter more appropriate for the General Assembly, finding it to be, "expedient that complaints of individual officers for offenses against the Constitution should be made in the first instance to the Gen'l Assembly."

Chipman served as a presidential elector from Vermont in 1792. He voted for George Washington and John Adams. He had been appointed to be an elector by the General Assembly. He subsequently sought unsuccessfully to again be an elector from Vermont. In 1796 he was elected president of the first Vermont Medical Association

=== New York ===
In 1796 and 1797, Chipman was a member of the New York State Assembly representing Ontario County. In 1800 and 1801, he was again a member of the New York State Assembly, this from a seat representing both Ontario County and Steuben County. From 1802 through 1805, Chipman was a member of the New York State Senate, representing the Western District.

In 1802, Chipman was on the New York Council of Appointment. He also served for several years as an Ontario County judge.

In 1816 Chipman served as a presidential elector from New York in support of the Democratic-Republican ticket led by James Monroe.

== Death ==
Chipman died on April 28, 1831, in Richmond, New York at the age of 76. He was buried at the West Avenue Cemetery in Canandaigua, New York.
