= John Woodworth (New York politician) =

New York State Attorney General

8th New York State Attorney General
- In office February 3, 1804 – March 18, 1808
- Governor: Morgan Lewis; Daniel D. Tompkins
- Preceded by: Ambrose Spencer
- Succeeded by: Matthias B. Hildreth

Justice of the New York Supreme Court
- In office 1819–1828
- Governor: DeWitt Clinton, Joseph C. Yates

State Senator for New York
- In office 1804–1807

Representative for Renssealaer County in New York State Assembly
- In office 1803–1803

Personal details
- Born: November 12, 1768 Schodack, New York
- Died: June 1, 1858 (aged 89) Albany, New York
- Party: Democratic-Republican
- Education: Yale College
- Profession: Lawyer

John Woodworth (November 12, 1768, Schodack – June 1, 1858, Albany, New York) was an American lawyer and member of the Woodworth political family.

== Early life and education ==
Woodworth was born in 1768, the son of future New York State Senator Robert Woodworth, and Rachel Fitch, daughter of Abel Fitch. Woodworth studied law with John Lansing Jr. at Yale College, graduating in 1788, and was admitted to the bar in 1791.

== Personal life ==
He married Catharine Westerlo (1778–1846, sister of Rensselaer Westerlo, and half-sister of Stephen Van Rensselaer III).

== Public service ==
Woodworth commenced practice in Troy, New York, and was appointed Loan Commissioner in 1792 and Surrogate of Rensselaer County from 1793 to 1804. He was the Democratic-Republican nominee for New York's 7th congressional district in 1796, losing to Federalist incumbent John Evert Van Alen. He was a presidential elector in 1800, voting for Thomas Jefferson and Aaron Burr. In 1811, Woodworth was appointed a commissioner to revise the state laws. Woodworth was a Regent of the University of the State of New York.

Woodworth was a member from Renssealaer County of the New York State Assembly in 1803. During this session, he was the Democratic-Republican caucus nominee for the election of a U.S. Senator from New York, but was narrowly defeated by Theodorus Bailey who was supported by a faction of his party who combined with the Federalists.

Woodworth was a member of the New York State Senate from 1804 to 1807, and at the same time was New York State Attorney General from 1804 to 1808. He was a justice of the New York State Supreme Court from 1819 to 1828. He was one of the last members of the Council of Revision which was abolished by the New York State Constitutional Convention of 1821.

== Literary works ==
- Laws of New York, with Notes (with William P. Van Ness, 2 vols., Albany, 1813)
- Reminiscences of Troy from its Settlement in 1790 till 1807 (Albany, 1855)

Legal offices
Preceded by Ambrose Spencer	New York State Attorney General; 1804–1808	Succeeded by Matthias B. Hildreth
