= Solomon Sutherland =

American politician

Solomon Sutherland (1762 – September 10, 1802) was an American politician from New York.

== Life ==
He lived in Stanford, Dutchess County, New York.

He married Tamma Thompson (1764–1790) who died shortly after the birth of their daughter Tamma (1790–1793*).

He was a member of the New York State Assembly (Dutchess Co.) in 1796; and of the New York State Senate (Middle D.) from 1800 until his death in 1802.

His son Jacob Sutherland (ca. 1787–1845) was a justice of the New York Supreme Court from 1823 to 1836.

- According to his will, he had a daughter named Tamma who was still living in 1802.

== Sources ==
- The New York Civil List compiled by Franklin Benjamin Hough (pages 117f, 146 and 169; Weed, Parsons and Co., 1858)
- "New York Probate Records, 1629-1971," images, FamilySearch (https://familysearch.org/pal:/MM9.3.1/TH-1961-28664-41326-37?cc=1920234 : accessed 8 March 2016), Dutchess > Wills 1796-1806 vol B > image 249 of 418; county courthouses, New York.
