= Stephen Lush =

American politician

Stephen Lush (1753 – April, 1825) was an American politician and lawyer from New York, and an officer during the American Revolutionary War.

== Early life ==
Lush was born in New York City. He attended King's College, earning a bachelor of arts in 1770 and a master's degree in 1773. He was admitted to the bar in 1774, at the age of twenty-one, and moved to Albany to practice law and live with his brother, Richard.

== Career ==
After the start of the American Revolutionary War, he was elected to the Albany Committee of Correspondence in 1776. He served as a captain in the New York Volunteers in 1776, and then joined the Fifth New Jersey Regiment under Colonel Oliver Spencer, serving as acting judge advocate general in 1777. He attained the rank of major, and served as the aide-de-camp of General George Clinton. Clinton commanded Fort Montgomery, on the Hudson River; when the fort was taken by the British on October 6, 1777, Lush was captured. He was held prisoner for nearly a year, when he was used as bait in a proposed exchange of three prisoners; Clinton agreed without hesitation, unaware that one of the other American prisoners was actually a valuable British spy. After his release in 1778, Lush was appointed Clerk of the New York Court of Chancery.

=== Post-Revolutionary War ===
After the war, he moved to Albany and started a successful legal practice. He was elected to the New York Assembly in 1792 and 1793, and then to the New York Senate in 1800, representing the eastern senate district until 1803. He was elected again to the Assembly four more times, 1803 to 1806. Lush owned slaves as late as 1819; at one time, he had five in his house.

== Personal life ==
In 1781, he married Lydia Stringer (died 1841), the daughter of prominent physician Samuel Stringer. They had seven children:

- Samuel Lush (1782–1782), who died in infancy
- Samuel Stringer Lush (1783–1841)
- William Lush (1785–1846)
- Mary Lush
- Rachel Lush
- Gertrude Lush (c. 1797–1874), who married Robert James, the son of William James of Albany, one of the wealthiest people in the United States in the early 19th century.
- Richard Lush (1798–1828).

His son Samuel also became a lawyer and a member of the New York Assembly.

After his death in April 1825, Lush was buried in Albany Rural Cemetery.
