= Jacobus Van Schoonhoven =

American politician

Member of the New York State Senate from the Western District (1794-1796), Eastern District (1796-1805)
- In office January 7, 1794 – April 10, 1805

Judge of the New York Court of Common Pleas

Member of the New York State Assembly from Albany
- In office January 5, 1791 – March 24, 1791
- In office January 12, 1786 – May 5, 1786

Personal details
- Born: February 2, 1744 Waterford, New York
- Died: February 21, 1814 (aged 70)
- Party: Federalist
- Spouse: Elizabeth Clute (m. 1764)

Military service
- Allegiance: State of New York
- Years of service: 1775-1777
- Rank: Colonel
- Commands: 12th Albany County Militia Regiment
- Battles/wars: American Revolutionary War - Saratoga campaign

Jacobus Van Schoonhoven (February 2, 1744 - February 21, 1814) was a colonel of the 12th Albany County Militia Regiment also known as Van Schoonhoven's Regiment of Militia which fought in the American Revolutionary War. Jacobus was born in Waterford, New York, to Guert Van Schoonhoven and Anna Lansing. At age 20 in 1764 he was married to Elizabeth Clute. On October 20, 1775, at age 31 in Halfmoon, New York Jacobus was commissioned to form and become colonel of the 12th Albany County Militia Regiment as to reinforce Horatio Gates' Continental Army during the Saratoga campaign since he was a man of great prominence in Albany and Saratoga, finishing his service in 1777 with a resounding victory. Once at home he led a standard life until 9 years later in 1786 when he was elected to the New York State Assembly, serving until 1791 hereafter he became judge of the court of common pleas. In 1793 he won an election to become a New York state senator from Half Moon County, serving in that position until 1805. He was a farm produce merchant and dealer for the rest of his life until he died at age 70 on February 21, 1814, in Waterford. He was buried in the Van Schoonhoven Cemetery.
