= Asa Danforth =

- Born: July 6, 1748; Worcester, Massachusetts
- Died: September 2, 1818 (aged 70); Onondaga Hollow, New York
- Spouse: Hannah Wheeler
- Children: Asa Danforth Jr
- Parent(s): Thomas Danforth and Sarah Danforth (Butterfield)

Asa Danforth (1746-1818) was father of salt manufacturer and an early colonizer Asa Danforth Jr. Danforth was originally from Worcester, Massachusetts and moved his family to the Onondaga Valley area of New York. He was known to have anti-British sentiments.

== Danforths in America ==
Danforth traces his roots back to surveyor Jonathan Danforth Sr (1628 - 1712) arrived in America aboard the Griffin in 1634 or 1635. He was born in Framingham, High Suffolk, England and worked on surveying work in colonial America and likely the brother of Thomas Danforth and son of Nicholas Danforth (1589–1638) and Elizabeth Symmes (1596–1629). Several generations of Danforths would reside in Massachusetts.
