= 34th New York State Legislature =

New York state legislative session

←	33rd	35th	→
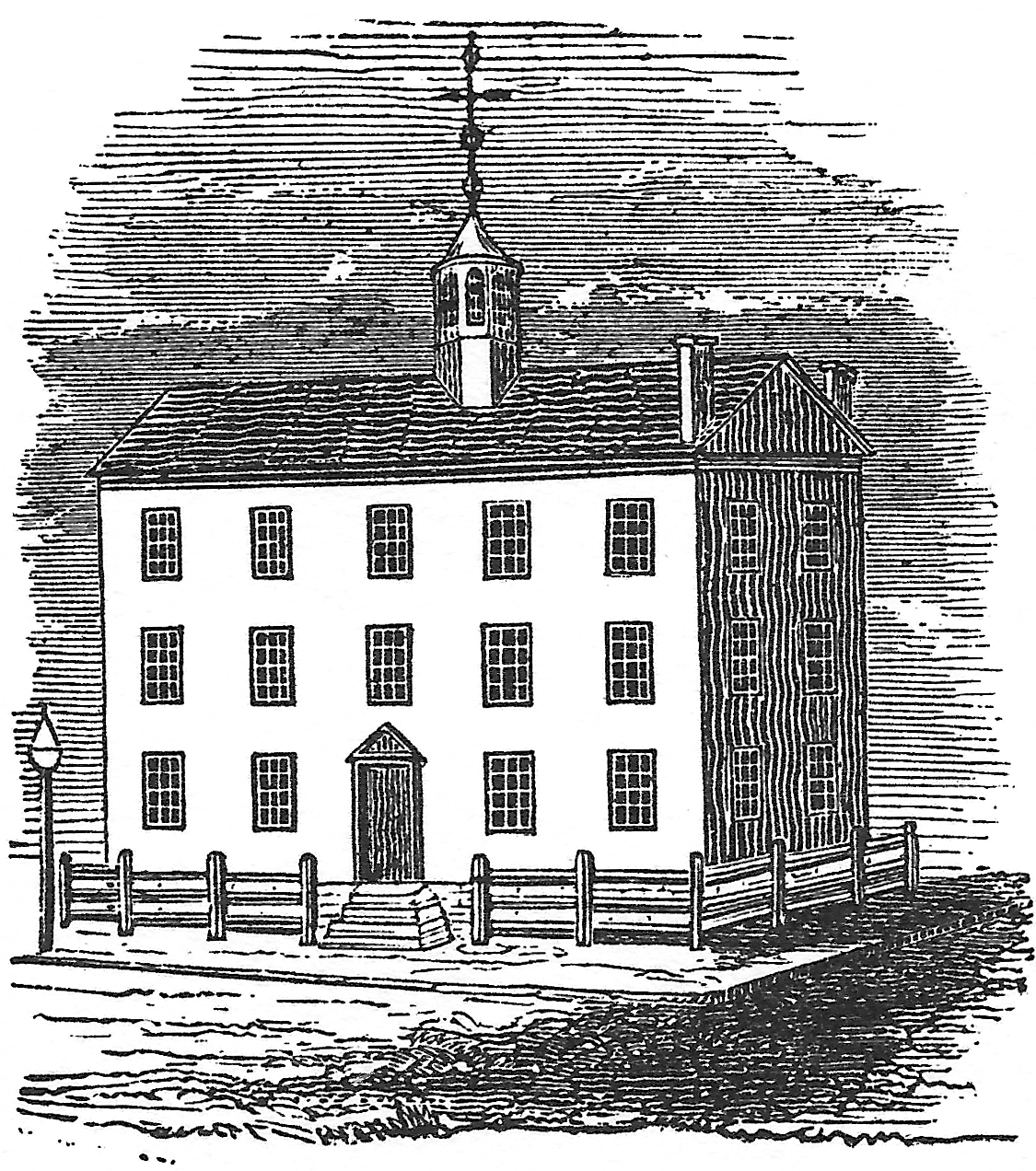
- The Old Albany City Hall (undated)

Overview
- Legislative body: New York State Legislature
- Jurisdiction: New York, United States
- Term: July 1, 1810 – June 30, 1811

Senate
- Members: 32
- President: Lt. Gov. John Broome (Dem.-Rep.; died August 8, 1810)
- Temporary President: John Tayler (Dem.-Rep.; elected January 29, 1811)
- Party control: Democratic-Republican (25–6)

Assembly
- Members: 112
- Speaker: Nathan Sanford (Dem.-Rep.; elected January 29); William Ross (Dem.-Rep.; elected February 12)
- Party control: Democratic-Republican (65–37)

Sessions
- 1st: January 29 – April 9, 1811

The 34th New York State Legislature, consisting of the New York State Senate and the New York State Assembly, met from January 29 to April 9, 1811, during the fourth year of Daniel D. Tompkins's governorship, in Albany.

== Background ==
Under the provisions of the New York Constitution of 1777, amended by the Constitutional Convention of 1801, 32 Senators were elected on general tickets in the four senatorial districts for four-year terms. They were divided into four classes, and every year eight Senate seats came up for election. Assemblymen were elected countywide on general tickets to a one-year term, the whole Assembly being renewed annually.

In 1797, Albany was declared the State capital, and all subsequent Legislatures have been meeting there ever since. In 1799, the Legislature enacted that future Legislatures meet on the last Tuesday of January of each year unless called earlier by the governor.

At this time the politicians were divided into two opposing political parties: the Federalists and the Democratic-Republicans.

== Elections ==
The State election was held from April 24 to 26, 1810. Gov. Daniel D. Tompkins and Lt. Gov. John Broome (both Dem.-Rep.) were re-elected.

Senator Nathan Smith (Western D.) was re-elected. Ebenezer White (Southern D.), Ex-Gov. Morgan Lewis, James W. Wilkin (both Middle D.), Henry Yates Jr. (Eastern D.), Reuben Humphrey, Philetus Swift and Henry A. Townsend (all three Western D.) were also elected to the Senate. All eight were Democratic-Republicans.

== Sessions ==
The Legislature met at the Old City Hall in Albany on January 29, 1811; and adjourned on April 9.

Nathan Sanford (Dem.-Rep.) was elected Speaker with 64 votes against 33 for Samuel A. Barker (Fed.). Samuel North (Dem.-Rep.) was elected Clerk of the Assembly with 64 votes against 37 for the incumbent James Van Ingen (Fed.). Sanford soon became ill, and could not attend the session anymore, and on February 12, William Ross (Dem.-Rep.) was elected Speaker for the remainder of the session with 65 votes against 24 for Barker (Fed.).

Lt. Gov. Broome died on August 8, 1810, leaving the presidency of the State Senate vacant. The senators elected John Tayler (Dem.-Rep.) as president pro tempore (vote: Tayler 21, Lewis 2, blank 2).

On January 30, the Dem.-Rep. Assembly majority elected a new Council of Appointment which removed almost all Federalist office-holders, most of whom had been appointed during the previous year.

At this session, the Legislature passed a bill incorporating the Mechanics and Farmers Bank of Albany, and Solomon Southwick became its first President.

On April 8, 1811, the Legislature appointed a new Erie Canal Commission to continue the planning and eventually the construction of the Erie Canal. The previous commissioners Gouverneur Morris, Stephen Van Rensselaer, William North, Thomas Eddy, State Senator DeWitt Clinton, Surveyor General Simeon DeWitt and Congressman Peter B. Porter were re-appointed; and Ex-Chancellor Robert R. Livingston and Robert Fulton, who were running a steamboat service between New York City and Albany, were added to the commission.

== State Senate ==
=== Districts ===
- The Southern District (5 seats) consisted of Kings, New York, Queens, Richmond, Suffolk and Westchester counties.
- The Middle District (7 seats) consisted of Dutchess, Orange, Ulster, Columbia, Delaware, Rockland, Greene and Sullivan counties.
- The Eastern District (8 seats) consisted of Washington, Clinton, Rensselaer, Albany, Saratoga, Essex, Montgomery, Franklin and Schenectady counties.
- The Western District (12 seats) consisted of Herkimer, Ontario, Otsego, Tioga, Onondaga, Schoharie, Steuben, Chenango, Oneida, Cayuga, Genesee, Seneca, Jefferson, Lewis, St. Lawrence, Allegany, Broome, Madison, Niagara and Cortland counties.
Note: There are now 62 counties in the State of New York. The counties which are not mentioned in this list had not yet been established, or sufficiently organized, the area being included in one or more of the abovementioned counties.

=== Members ===
The asterisk (*) denotes members of the previous Legislature who continued in office as members of this Legislature.

District	Senators	Term left	Party	Notes
Southern	DeWitt Clinton*	1 year	Dem.-Rep.	also an Erie Canal Commissioner; from February 1, 1811, also Mayor of New York City
Southern	Benjamin Coe*	2 years	Dem.-Rep.	elected to the Council of Appointment
Southern	William W. Gilbert*	2 years	Dem.-Rep.	
Southern	Israel Carll*	3 years	Dem.-Rep.	
Southern	Ebenezer White	4 years	Dem.-Rep.	
Middle	Joshua H. Brett*	1 year	Dem.-Rep.	
Middle	Robert Williams*	1 year	none	
Middle	Edward P. Livingston*	2 years	Dem.-Rep.	
Middle	Johannes Bruyn*	3 years	Dem.-Rep.	
Middle	Samuel Haight*	3 years	Dem.-Rep.	
Middle	Morgan Lewis	4 years	Dem.-Rep.	
Middle	James W. Wilkin	4 years	Dem.-Rep.	elected to the Council of Appointment
Eastern	Isaac Kellogg*	1 year	Dem.-Rep.	
Eastern	John McLean*	1 year	Dem.-Rep.	elected to the Council of Appointment
Eastern	Charles Selden*	1 year	Dem.-Rep.	
Eastern	John Tayler*	1 year	Dem.-Rep.	elected President pro tempore
Eastern	David Hopkins*	2 years	Federalist	
Eastern	Daniel Paris*	3 years	Federalist	
Eastern	John Stearns*	3 years	Federalist	
Eastern	Henry Yates Jr.	4 years	Dem.-Rep.	
Western	Alexander Rea*	1 year	Dem.-Rep.	
Western	Francis A. Bloodgood*	2 years	Dem.-Rep.	
Western	Walter Martin*	2 years	Dem.-Rep.	
Western	Luther Rich*	2 years	Dem.-Rep.	
Western	Sylvanus Smalley*	2 years	Dem.-Rep.	
Western	Amos Hall*	3 years	Federalist	
Western	Seth Phelps*	3 years	Federalist	
Western	Jonas Platt*	3 years	Federalist	
Western	Reuben Humphrey	4 years	Dem.-Rep.	
Western	Nathan Smith*	4 years	Dem.-Rep.	
Western	Philetus Swift	4 years	Dem.-Rep.	elected to the Council of Appointment
Western	Henry A. Townsend	4 years	Dem.-Rep.	

=== Employees ===
- Clerk: Sebastian Visscher

== State Assembly ==
=== Districts ===
- Albany County (4 seats)
- Allegany and Steuben counties (1 seat)
- Broome County (1 seat)
- Cayuga County (3 seats)
- Chenango County (3 seats)
- Clinton and Franklin counties (1 seat)
- Columbia County (4 seats)
- Cortland County (1 seat)
- Delaware County (2 seats)
- Dutchess County (6 seats)
- Essex County (1 seat)
- Genesee County (1 seat)
- Greene County (2 seats)
- Herkimer County (3 seats)
- Jefferson County (2 seats)
- Kings County (1 seat)
- Lewis County (1 seat)
- Madison County (3 seats)
- Montgomery County (5 seats)
- The City and County of New York (11 seats)
- Niagara County (1 seat)
- Oneida County (5 seats)
- Onondaga County (2 seats)
- Ontario County (5 seats)
- Orange County (4 seats)
- Otsego County (4 seats)
- Queens County (3 seats)
- Rensselaer County (4 seats)
- Richmond County (1 seat)
- Rockland County (1 seat)
- St. Lawrence County (1 seat)
- Saratoga County (4 seats)
- Schenectady County (2 seats)
- Schoharie County (2 seats)
- Seneca County (1 seat)
- Suffolk County (3 seats)
- Sullivan and Ulster counties (4 seats)
- Tioga County (1 seat)
- Washington County (5 seats)
- Westchester County (3 seats)
Note: There are now 62 counties in the State of New York. The counties which are not mentioned in this list had not yet been established, or sufficiently organized, the area being included in one or more of the abovementioned counties.

=== Assemblymen ===
The asterisk (*) denotes members of the previous Legislature who continued as members of this Legislature.

District	Assemblymen	Party	Notes
Albany	Asa Colvard	Federalist	
Albany	David Delong	Federalist	
Albany	Johann Jost Dietz	Federalist	
Albany	Abraham Van Vechten*	Federalist	until February 1, 1811, also New York Attorney General
Allegany and Steuben	John Knox*	Federalist	
Broome	none		no election returns from this county
Cayuga	Stephen Close*	Dem.-Rep.	
Cayuga	Elisha Durkee	Dem.-Rep.	
Cayuga	Ebenezer Hewitt	Dem.-Rep.	
Chenango	Peter Betts		
Chenango	Thompson Mead		
Chenango	Joseph Simonds	Dem.-Rep.	
Clinton and Franklin	Gates Hoit*	Federalist	unsuccessfully contested by William Steward
Columbia	Thomas P. Grosvenor*	Federalist	until February 15, 1811, also District Attorney of the 3rd District
Columbia	Augustus Tremain		
Columbia	James Vanderpoel	Federalist	
Columbia	Jacob R. Van Rensselaer	Federalist	
Cortland	Billy Trowbridge		
Delaware	Daniel Fuller		
Delaware	David St. John		
Dutchess	Samuel A. Barker	Federalist	
Dutchess	Lemuel Clift*	Federalist	
Dutchess	Koert Dubois*	Federalist	
Dutchess	Alexander Neely*	Federalist	
Dutchess	Shadrach Sherman	Federalist	
Dutchess	Isaac Van Wyck*	Federalist	
Essex	Delevan Delance Jr.		
Genesee	Chauncey Loomis*	Dem.-Rep.	
Greene	William Beach		
Greene	Jonas Bronk		
Herkimer	Christopher P. Bellinger*	Dem.-Rep.	
Herkimer	Robert Burch	Dem.-Rep.	
Herkimer	Hosea Nelson	Dem.-Rep.	
Jefferson	Corlis Hinds	Dem.-Rep.	
Jefferson	Ethel Bronson*	Federalist	contested; seat vacated
Jefferson	William Hunter		seated on February 4, 1811, in place of Ethel Bronson
Kings	John C. Vanderveer	Dem.-Rep.	
Lewis	Nathaniel Merriam		
Madison	John W. Bulkley*	Federalist	
Madison	Henry Clark Jr.		
Madison	Zebulon Douglass		
Montgomery	Daniel Cady*	Federalist	
Montgomery	Jacob Eaker	Dem.-Rep.	
Montgomery	Daniel Hurlbut		
Montgomery	James McIntyre	Dem.-Rep.	
Montgomery	George H. Nellis		
New York	Robert Bogardus		
New York	Thomas Carpenter	Federalist	
New York	Thomas Farmar*		
New York	John Gelston		
New York	Samuel Lawrence	Dem.-Rep.	from February 19, 1811, also New York County Clerk
New York	Jonas Mapes		
New York	Thomas R. Mercein	Federalist	
New York	Nathan Sanford	Dem.-Rep.	elected Speaker; did not attend after February 12; also United States Attorney for the District of New York
New York	Isaac Sebring	Federalist	
New York	Solomon Townsend*		died March 27, 1811
New York	John Vanderbilt Jr.		
Niagara	Archibald S. Clarke*	Dem.-Rep.	also Surrogate of Niagara County
Oneida	Isaac Brayton	Federalist	
Oneida	George Doolittle		
Oneida	George Huntington	Federalist	
Oneida	Henry McNeil	Federalist	
Oneida	John Storrs*	Federalist	
Onondaga	Robert Earll		
Onondaga	Jasper Hopper	Dem.-Rep.	
Ontario	Septimus Evans		
Ontario	Robert Hart		
Ontario	Hugh McNair		
Ontario	Stephen Phelps		
Ontario	Asahel Warner	Dem.-Rep.	
Orange	John Blake Jr.	Dem.-Rep.	
Orange	Anthony Davis	Dem.-Rep.	
Orange	Seth Marvin		
Orange	William Ross	Dem.-Rep.	on February 12, elected Speaker
Otsego	Daniel Hawks		
Otsego	Isaac Hayes	Dem.-Rep.	
Otsego	Elijah H. Metcalf	Dem.-Rep.	
Otsego	Robert Roseboom	Dem.-Rep.	
Queens	Stephen Carman*	Federalist	
Queens	Daniel Kissam	Federalist	
Queens	William Townsend*	Federalist	
Rensselaer	William M. Bliss		
Rensselaer	Daniel Hull Jr.		
Rensselaer	Cornelius I. Schermerhorn*	Federalist	
Rensselaer	Cornelius Van Vechten		
Richmond	James Guyon, Jr.	Dem.-Rep.	contested; seat vacated
Richmond	Richard Connor	Federalist	seated on March 21, 1811, in place of James Guyon, Jr.
Rockland	Peter S. Van Orden*	Dem.-Rep.	
St. Lawrence	Roswell Hopkins*	Federalist	
Saratoga	John Cramer		
Saratoga	Jesse Mott	Dem.-Rep.	
Saratoga	Jeremy Rockwell		
Saratoga	David Rogers	Dem.-Rep.	
Schenectady	James Boyd	Dem.-Rep.	
Schenectady	John Young	Dem.-Rep.	
Schoharie	Henry Becker	Dem.-Rep./Fed.	Becker was a Democratic-Republican who ran on both tickets
Schoharie	Henry Hager	Dem.-Rep.	
Seneca	Robert S. Rose	Dem.-Rep.	
Suffolk	Jonathan S. Conklin	Dem.-Rep.	
Suffolk	Thomas S. Lester	Dem.-Rep.	
Suffolk	Tredwell Scudder*	Dem.-Rep.	
Sullivan and Ulster	John Conklin*	Dem.-Rep.	
Sullivan and Ulster	Samuel Hawkins	Dem.-Rep.	
Sullivan and Ulster	John Lounsbery	Dem.-Rep.	
Sullivan and Ulster	Nehemiah L. Smith	Dem.-Rep.	
Tioga	Thomas Floyd		
Washington	John Baker	Dem.-Rep.	
Washington	John Richards	Dem.-Rep.	
Washington	Isaac Sargent	Dem.-Rep.	
Washington	Reuben Whallon	Dem.-Rep.	
Washington	David Woods	Dem.-Rep.	
Westchester	Darius Crosby	Dem.-Rep.	
Westchester	Abraham Miller	Dem.-Rep.	
Westchester	Jacob Odell	Dem.-Rep.	

=== Employees ===
- Clerk: Samuel North
- Sergeant-at-Arms: Thomas Donnelly
- Doorkeeper: Benjamin Whipple

== Sources ==
- The New York Civil List compiled by Franklin Benjamin Hough (Weed, Parsons and Co., 1858) [see pg. 108f for Senate districts; pg. 121 for senators; pg. 148f for Assembly districts; pg. 184f for assemblymen]
- The History of Political Parties in the State of New-York, from the Ratification of the Federal Constitution to 1840 by Jabez D. Hammond (4th ed., Vol. 1, H. & E. Phinney, Cooperstown, 1846; pages 285-290)
- Election result Assembly, Albany Co. at project "A New Nation Votes", compiled by Phil Lampi, hosted by Tufts University Digital Library
- Election result Assembly, Allegany and Steuben Co. at project "A New Nation Votes"
- Election result Assembly, Broome Co. at project "A New Nation Votes" [the result was not filed with the Secretary of State]
- Election result Assembly, Cayuga Co. at project "A New Nation Votes"
- Election result Assembly, Delaware Co. at project "A New Nation Votes"
- Election result Assembly, Dutchess Co. at project "A New Nation Votes"
- Election result Assembly, Genesee Co. at project "A New Nation Votes"
- Election result Assembly, Greene Co. at project "A New Nation Votes"
- Election result Assembly, Herkimer Co. at project "A New Nation Votes"
- Election result Assembly, Jefferson Co. at project "A New Nation Votes"
- Election result Assembly, Lewis Co. at project "A New Nation Votes"
- Election result Assembly, Madison Co. at project "A New Nation Votes"
- Election result Assembly, Onondaga Co. at project "A New Nation Votes"
- Election result Assembly, Queens Co. at project "A New Nation Votes"
- Election result Assembly, Richmond Co. at project "A New Nation Votes"
- Election result Assembly, Schenectady Co. at project "A New Nation Votes"
- Election result Assembly, Schoharie Co. at project "A New Nation Votes"
- Election result Assembly, Sullivan and Ulster Co. at project "A New Nation Votes"
- Election result Assembly, Washington Co. at project "A New Nation Votes"
- Election result Assembly, Westchester Co. at project "A New Nation Votes"
- Election result Senate, Southern D. at project "A New Nation Votes"
- Election result Senate, Middle D. at project "A New Nation Votes"
- Election result Senate, Eastern D. at project "A New Nation Votes"
- Election result Senate, Western D. at project "A New Nation Votes"
- Election result, Assembly Speaker January at project "A New Nation Votes"
- Election result, Assembly Speaker February at project "A New Nation Votes"
- Election result, Assembly Clerk at project "A New Nation Votes"
- Election result, Senate President pro tem at project "A New Nation Votes"
