= 33rd New York State Legislature =

New York state legislative session

←	32nd	34th	→
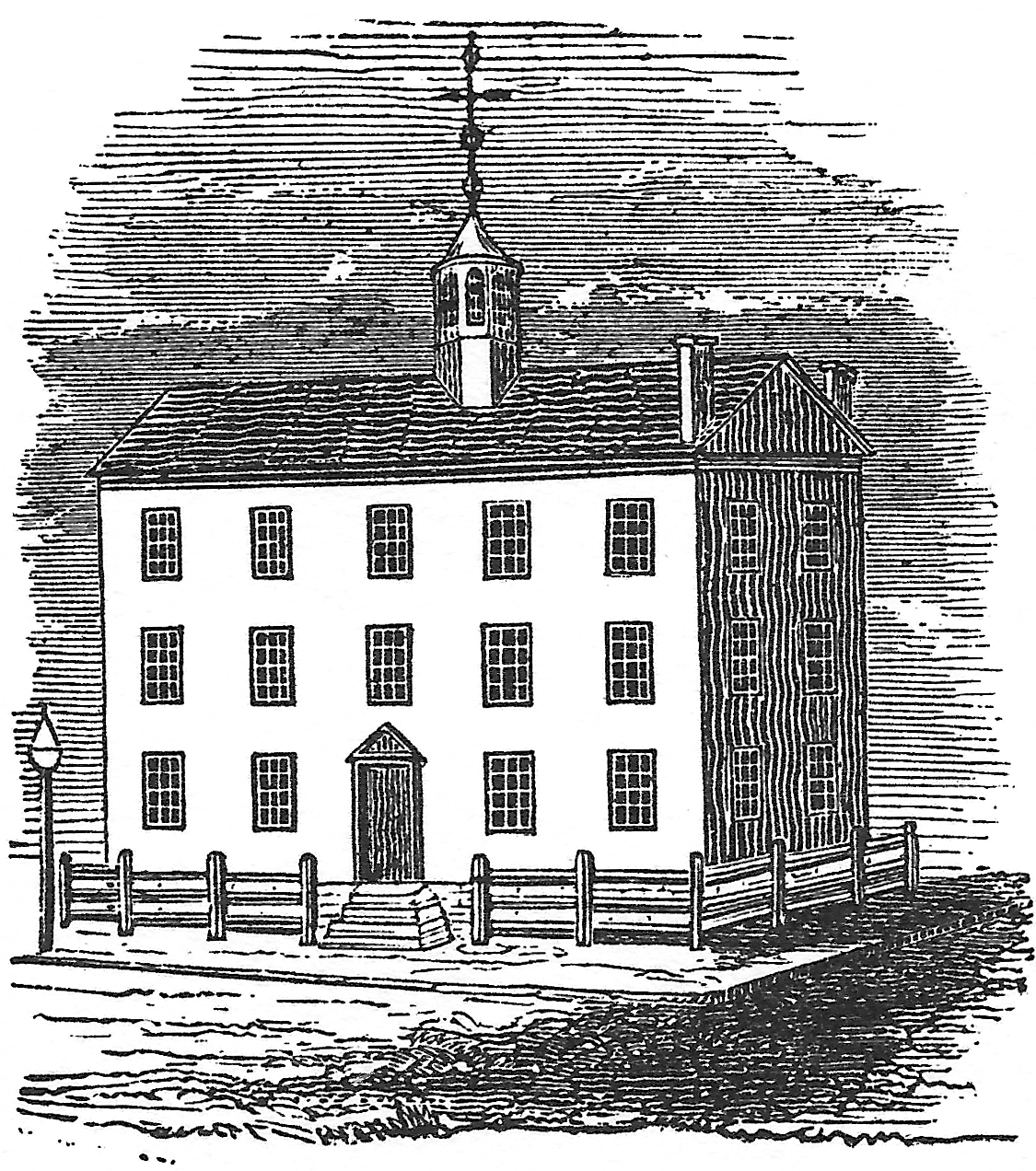
- The Old Albany City Hall (undated)

Overview
- Legislative body: New York State Legislature
- Jurisdiction: New York, United States
- Term: July 1, 1809 – June 30, 1810

Senate
- Members: 32
- President: Lt. Gov. John Broome (Dem.-Rep.)
- Party control: Democratic-Republican (25-7)

Assembly
- Members: 112
- Speaker: William North (Fed.)
- Party control: Federalist (60-47)

Sessions
- 1st: January 30 – April 6, 1810

The 33rd New York State Legislature, consisting of the New York State Senate and the New York State Assembly, met from January 30 to April 6, 1810, during the third year of Daniel D. Tompkins's governorship, in Albany.

== Background ==
Under the provisions of the New York Constitution of 1777, amended by the Constitutional Convention of 1801, 32 Senators were elected on general tickets in the four senatorial districts for four-year terms. They were divided into four classes, and every year eight Senate seats came up for election. Assemblymen were elected countywide on general tickets to a one-year term, the whole Assembly being renewed annually.

In 1797, Albany was declared the State capital, and all subsequent Legislatures have been meeting there ever since. In 1799, the Legislature enacted that future sessions would meet on the last Tuesday of January each year, unless called earlier by the governor.

In 1808, Cortland County was separated from Onondaga County, and in 1809, it was allocated one seat in the Assembly, taken from Onondaga. In 1809, Schenectady County was split from Albany County, and was apportioned 2 seats in the Assembly, taken from Albany. Also in 1809, Sullivan County was split from Ulster County, but both remained in a joint Assembly district.

At this time the politicians were divided into two opposing political parties: the Federalists and the Democratic-Republicans.

At this time the major political controversy was the Embargo Act of 1807 which was supported by the Democratic-Republicans, but opposed by the Federalists. The Embargo was very unpopular and led to a revival of the Federalist Party which had been reduced to a small minority (without any member in the Senate from 1806 to 1808), but at the State election in April 1809 already won a majority of the Assembly seats.

== Elections ==
The State election was held from April 25 to 27, 1809. Israel Carll (Southern D.), Johannes Bruyn, Samuel Haight (both Middle D.), Daniel Paris, John Stearns, (both Eastern D.), Amos Hall, Seth Phelps and Jonas Platt (all three Western D.) were elected to the Senate. Carll, Bruyn and Haight were Democratic-Republicans, the other five were Federalists.

== Sessions ==
The Legislature met at the Old City Hall in Albany on January 30, 1810; and adjourned on April 6.

William North (Fed.) was elected Speaker with 59 votes against 45 for William Livingston (Dem.-Rep.). James Van Ingen (Fed.) was elected Clerk of the Assembly with 59 votes against 47 for the incumbent Daniel Rodman (Dem.-Rep.). The incumbent Thomas D. Donnelly (Dem.-Rep.) was re-elected Sergeant-at-Arms of the Assembly with 55 votes against 49 for Jacob C. Cuyler (Fed.).

On February 8, the Legislature elected Abraham G. Lansing (Fed.) to succeed David Thomas (Dem.-Rep.) as New York State Treasurer.

On March 13, 1810, State Senator Jonas Platt presented his project for a bipartisan Canal Commission to the State Legislature, and two days later the Legislature appointed Gouverneur Morris, Assemblyman Stephen Van Rensselaer, Speaker William North, Thomas Eddy (all four Fed.), State Senator DeWitt Clinton, Surveyor General Simeon DeWitt and Congressman Peter B. Porter (all three Dem.-Rep.) a "Commission to Explore a Route for a Canal to Lake Erie, and Report".

== State Senate ==
=== Districts ===
- The Southern District (5 seats) consisted of Kings, New York, Queens, Richmond, Suffolk and Westchester counties.
- The Middle District (7 seats) consisted of Dutchess, Orange, Ulster, Columbia, Delaware, Rockland, Greene and Sullivan counties.
- The Eastern District (8 seats) consisted of Washington, Clinton, Rensselaer, Albany, Saratoga, Essex, Montgomery, Franklin and Schenectady counties.
- The Western District (12 seats) consisted of Herkimer, Ontario, Otsego, Tioga, Onondaga, Schoharie, Steuben, Chenango, Oneida, Cayuga, Genesee, Seneca, Jefferson, Lewis, St. Lawrence, Allegany, Broome, Madison, Niagara and Cortland counties.
Note: There are now 62 counties in the State of New York. The counties which are not mentioned in this list had not yet been established, or sufficiently organized, the area being included in one or more of the abovementioned counties.

=== Members ===
The asterisk (*) denotes members of the previous Legislature who continued in office as members of this Legislature.

District	Senators	Term left	Party	Notes
Southern	Jonathan Ward*	1 year	Dem.-Rep.	
Southern	DeWitt Clinton*	2 years	Dem.-Rep.	until February 2, 1810, also Mayor of New York City; on March 15, 1810, appointed to the Erie Canal Commission
Southern	Benjamin Coe*	3 years	Dem.-Rep.	
Southern	William W. Gilbert*	3 years	Dem.-Rep.	
Southern	Israel Carll	4 years	Dem.-Rep.	elected to the Council of Appointment
Middle	Elisha Barlow*	1 year	Dem.-Rep.	
Middle	James Burt*	1 year	Dem.-Rep.	
Middle	Joshua H. Brett*	2 years	Dem.-Rep.	
Middle	Robert Williams*	2 years	Federalist	elected to the Council of Appointment
Middle	Edward P. Livingston*	3 years	Dem.-Rep.	
Middle	Johannes Bruyn	4 years	Dem.-Rep.	
Middle	Samuel Haight	4 years	Dem.-Rep.	
Eastern	Jacob Snell*	1 years	Dem.-Rep.	
Eastern	Isaac Kellogg*	2 years	Dem.-Rep.	
Eastern	John McLean*	2 years	Dem.-Rep.	
Eastern	Charles Selden*	2 years	Dem.-Rep.	
Eastern	John Tayler*	2 years	Dem.-Rep.	
Eastern	David Hopkins*	3 years	Federalist	
Eastern	Daniel Paris	4 years	Federalist	elected to the Council of Appointment
Eastern	John Stearns	4 years	Federalist	
Western	John Ballard*	1 year	Dem.-Rep.	
Western	Salmon Buell*	1 year	Dem.-Rep.	
Western	Jacob Gebhard*	1 year	Dem.-Rep.	
Western	Nathan Smith*	1 year	Dem.-Rep.	
Western	Alexander Rea*	2 years	Dem.-Rep.	
Western	Francis A. Bloodgood*	3 years	Dem.-Rep.	
Western	Walter Martin*	3 years	Dem.-Rep.	
Western	Luther Rich*	3 years	Dem.-Rep.	
Western	Sylvanus Smalley*	3 years	Dem.-Rep.	
Western	Amos Hall	4 years	Federalist	elected to the Council of Appointment
Western	Seth Phelps	4 years	Federalist	
Western	Jonas Platt	4 years	Federalist	

=== Employees ===
- Clerk: Sebastian Visscher

== State Assembly ==
=== Districts ===
- Albany County (4 seats)
- Allegany and Steuben counties (1 seat)
- Broome County (1 seat)
- Cayuga County (3 seats)
- Chenango County (3 seats)
- Clinton and Franklin counties (1 seat)
- Columbia County (4 seats)
- Cortland County (1 seat)
- Delaware County (2 seats)
- Dutchess County (6 seats)
- Essex County (1 seat)
- Genesee County (1 seat)
- Greene County (2 seats)
- Herkimer County (3 seats)
- Jefferson County (2 seats)
- Kings County (1 seat)
- Lewis County (1 seat)
- Madison County (3 seats)
- Montgomery County (5 seats)
- The City and County of New York (11 seats)
- Niagara County (1 seat)
- Oneida County (5 seats)
- Onondaga County (2 seats)
- Ontario County (5 seats)
- Orange County (4 seats)
- Otsego County (4 seats)
- Queens County (3 seats)
- Rensselaer County (4 seats)
- Richmond County (1 seat)
- Rockland County (1 seat)
- St. Lawrence County (1 seat)
- Saratoga County (4 seats)
- Schenectady County (2 seats)
- Schoharie County (2 seats)
- Seneca County (1 seat)
- Suffolk County (3 seats)
- Sullivan and Ulster counties (4 seats)
- Tioga County (1 seat)
- Washington County (5 seats)
- Westchester County (3 seats)
Note: There are now 62 counties in the State of New York. The counties which are not mentioned in this list had not yet been established, or sufficiently organized, the area being included in one or more of the abovementioned counties.

=== Assemblymen ===
The asterisk (*) denotes members of the previous Legislature who continued as members of this Legislature. Nathaniel Locke changed from the Senate to the Assembly.

District	Assemblymen	Party	Notes
Albany	John Colvin	Federalist	
Albany	Abel French	Federalist	
Albany	Stephen Van Rensselaer*	Federalist	on March 15, 1810, appointed to the Erie Canal Commission
Albany	Abraham Van Vechten*	Federalist	from February 2, 1810, also New York Attorney General
Allegany and Steuben	John Knox	Federalist	
Broome	James Pumpelly	Federalist	
Cayuga	Henry Bloom*	Dem.-Rep.	
Cayuga	Stephen Close	Dem.-Rep.	
Cayuga	Charles Kellogg*	Dem.-Rep.	
Chenango	Nathaniel Locke*	Dem.-Rep.	
Chenango	John Noyes	Dem.-Rep.	
Chenango	Ebenezer Wakley*	Dem.-Rep.	
Clinton and Franklin	Gates Hoit	Federalist	
Columbia	Thomas P. Grosvenor	Federalist	from February 1810, also District Attorney of the 3rd District
Columbia	Henry W. Livingston	Fed./Dem.-Rep.	Livingston was a Federalist, but ran on both tickets
Columbia	William Lusk	Federalist	
Columbia	Anson Pratt	Federalist	
Cortland	Ephraim Fish		
Delaware	John T. More	Dem.-Rep.	
Delaware	Elias Osborn	Dem.-Rep.	
Dutchess	David Brooks	Federalist	from February 9, 1810, also Dutchess County Clerk
Dutchess	Lemuel Clift	Federalist	
Dutchess	Koert Dubois	Federalist	
Dutchess	Ebenezer Haight*	Federalist	
Dutchess	Alexander Neely	Federalist	
Dutchess	Isaac Van Wyck	Federalist	
Essex	Benjamin Pond*	Dem.-Rep.	in April 1810, elected to the 12th United States Congress
Genesee	Chauncey Loomis	Dem.-Rep.	
Greene	Benjamin Chapman		
Greene	Ira Day	Federalist	
Herkimer	Christopher P. Bellinger	Dem.-Rep.	
Herkimer	Rudolph Devendorff	Federalist	
Herkimer	Thomas Manly	Federalist	
Jefferson	Ethel Bronson	Federalist	
Jefferson	Moss Kent	Federalist	
Kings	Jeremiah Johnson*	Federalist	
Lewis	Lewis Graves		
Madison	John W. Bulkley*	Federalist	
Madison	Amos B. Fuller	Federalist	
Madison	Daniel Van Horne	Federalist	
Montgomery	James Allen	Federalist	
Montgomery	Daniel Cady*	Federalist	
Montgomery	John Greene*	Federalist	
Montgomery	Richard Van Horne*	Federalist	
Montgomery	David J. Zeilly	Federalist	
New York	John P. Anthony*		
New York	Abraham E. Brouwer		
New York	Thomas Farmar*		
New York	Adrian Hegeman		
New York	Samuel L. Mitchill	Dem.-Rep.	in April 1810, elected to the 11th United States Congress
New York	Caleb Pell*		
New York	Ichabod Prall		
New York	Samuel Tooker	Dem.-Rep.	
New York	Solomon Townsend*		
New York	Beekman M. Van Buren*		
New York	Augustus Wright	Dem.-Rep.	
Niagara	Archibald S. Clarke*	Dem.-Rep.	also Surrogate of Niagara County
Oneida	Levi Carpenter Jr.		
Oneida	Samuel Chandler		
Oneida	John Humaston		
Oneida	David Ostrom*	Federalist	
Oneida	John Storrs*	Federalist	
Onondaga	Jacobus Dupuy*	Dem.-Rep.	
Onondaga	Barnet Mooney*	Dem.-Rep.	
Ontario	Valentine Brother	Federalist	
Ontario	Israel Chapin		
Ontario	David Dorsey		
Ontario	William Markham		
Ontario	Gideon Pitts		
Orange	James Finch Jr.	Dem.-Rep.	
Orange	Joseph Morrell	Dem.-Rep.	
Orange	John Nicholson	Dem.-Rep.	
Orange	Selah Strong	Dem.-Rep.	
Otsego	Joseph Bowne		
Otsego	Erastus Crafts		
Otsego	Abel DeForest		
Otsego	Benjamin Gilbert		
Queens	Stephen Carman*	Federalist	
Queens	David Kissam*	Federalist	
Queens	William Townsend*	Federalist	
Rensselaer	Timothy Leonard	Federalist	
Rensselaer	Henry Platt*	Federalist	
Rensselaer	Cornelius I. Schermerhorn*	Federalist	
Rensselaer	Jeremiah Schuyler	Federalist	
Richmond	Richard Connor	Federalist	
Rockland	Peter S. Van Orden	Dem.-Rep.	
St. Lawrence	Roswell Hopkins	Federalist	
Saratoga	Joel Lee		
Saratoga	Samuel Lewis	Dem.-Rep.	
Saratoga	Daniel L. Van Antwerp*	Dem.-Rep.	
Saratoga	Calvin Wheeler		
Schenectady	Henry Glen	Federalist	
Schenectady	William North	Federalist	elected Speaker; on March 15, 1810, appointed to the Erie Canal Commission
Schoharie	John Ingold Jr.*	Federalist	
Schoharie	John Rice*	Federalist	
Seneca	Oliver C. Comstock	Dem.-Rep.	
Suffolk	Abraham Rose*	Dem.-Rep.	
Suffolk	John Rose	Dem.-Rep.	
Suffolk	Tredwell Scudder	Dem.-Rep.	
Sullivan and Ulster	Benjamin Bevier	Dem.-Rep.	
Sullivan and Ulster	John Conklin	Dem.-Rep.	
Sullivan and Ulster	Abraham Hardenbergh	Dem.-Rep.	
Sullivan and Ulster	Abraham J. Hasbrouck	Dem.-Rep.	
Tioga	Emanuel Coryell*	Federalist	
Washington	Kitchel Bishop*	Dem.-Rep.	
Washington	John Gale	Dem.-Rep.	
Washington	Jason Kellogg	Dem.-Rep.	
Washington	William Livingston	Dem.-Rep.	
Washington	Roger Skinner*	Dem.-Rep.	
Westchester	William Barker*	Federalist	
Westchester	Abraham Odell*	Federalist	
Westchester	Samuel Youngs*	Federalist	

=== Employees ===
- Clerk: James Van Ingen
- Sergeant-at-Arms: Thomas Donnelly
- Doorkeeper: Benjamin Whipple

== Sources ==
- The New York Civil List compiled by Franklin Benjamin Hough (Weed, Parsons and Co., 1858) [see pg. 108f for Senate districts; pg. 120f for senators; pg. 148f for Assembly districts; pg. 183f for assemblymen]
- The History of Political Parties in the State of New-York, from the Ratification of the Federal Constitution to 1840 by Jabez D. Hammond (4th ed., Vol. 1, H. & E. Phinney, Cooperstown, 1846; pages 276-284)
- Election result Assembly, Albany Co. at project "A New Nation Votes", compiled by Phil Lampi, hosted by Tufts University Digital Library
- Election result Assembly, Allegany and Steuben Co. at project "A New Nation Votes"
- Election result Assembly, Broome Co. at project "A New Nation Votes"
- Election result Assembly, Chenango Co. at project "A New Nation Votes"
- Election result Assembly, Columbia Co. at project "A New Nation Votes"
- Election result Assembly, Delaware Co. at project "A New Nation Votes"
- Election result Assembly, Dutchess Co. at project "A New Nation Votes"
- Election result Assembly, Essex Co. at project "A New Nation Votes"
- Election result Assembly, Genesee Co. at project "A New Nation Votes"
- Election result Assembly, Greene Co. at project "A New Nation Votes"
- Election result Assembly, Herkimer Co. at project "A New Nation Votes"
- Election result Assembly, Jefferson Co. at project "A New Nation Votes"
- Election result Assembly, Kings Co. at project "A New Nation Votes"
- Election result Assembly, Madison Co. at project "A New Nation Votes"
- Election result Assembly, Montgomery Co. at project "A New Nation Votes"
- Election result Assembly, Onondaga Co. at project "A New Nation Votes"
- Election result Assembly, Orange Co. at project "A New Nation Votes"
- Election result Assembly, Queens Co. at project "A New Nation Votes"
- Election result Assembly, Rensselaer Co. at project "A New Nation Votes"
- Election result Assembly, Richmond Co. at project "A New Nation Votes"
- Election result Assembly, Rockland Co. at project "A New Nation Votes"
- Election result Assembly, St. Lawrence Co. at project "A New Nation Votes"
- Election result Assembly, Schenectady Co. at project "A New Nation Votes"
- Election result Assembly, Schoharie Co. at project "A New Nation Votes"
- Election result Assembly, Seneca Co. at project "A New Nation Votes"
- Election result Assembly, Suffolk Co. at project "A New Nation Votes" [gives wrong party affiliation for Scudder]
- Election result Assembly, Sullivan and Ulster Co. at project "A New Nation Votes"
- Election result Assembly, Washington Co. at project "A New Nation Votes"
- Election result Assembly, Westchester Co. at project "A New Nation Votes"
- Election result Senate, Southern D. at project "A New Nation Votes"
- Election result Senate, Middle D. at project "A New Nation Votes"
- Election result Senate, Eastern D. at project "A New Nation Votes"
- Election result Senate, Western D. at project "A New Nation Votes"
- Election result, Assembly Speaker at project "A New Nation Votes"
- Election result, Assembly Clerk at project "A New Nation Votes"
- Election result, Assembly Sergeant-at-Arms at project "A New Nation Votes"
