= Elisha Barlow (New York politician) =

American politician (1750–1828)

Elisha Barlow (1750–1828) was a state legislator and judge in New York. He served in New York's state legislature from 1800 to 1802 and in the New York Senate from 1807 to 1810. He was also a county court judge in 1808. From 1800 to 1802 he represented Amenia.

A native of Sandwich, Massachusetts, he moved to Poughkeepsie, New York with his father Moses Barlow and grandfather Peleg in 1756. He was a delegate to New York's 1821 Constitutional Convention.

== See also ==
- 24th New York State Legislature
- 25th New York State Legislature
- 30th New York State Legislature
- 31st New York State Legislature
- 32nd New York State Legislature
- 33rd New York State Legislature
- List of New York state senators
- T. B. Walker
- Thomas Barlow (New York politician)
