= 31st New York State Legislature =

New York state legislative session

←	30th	32nd	→
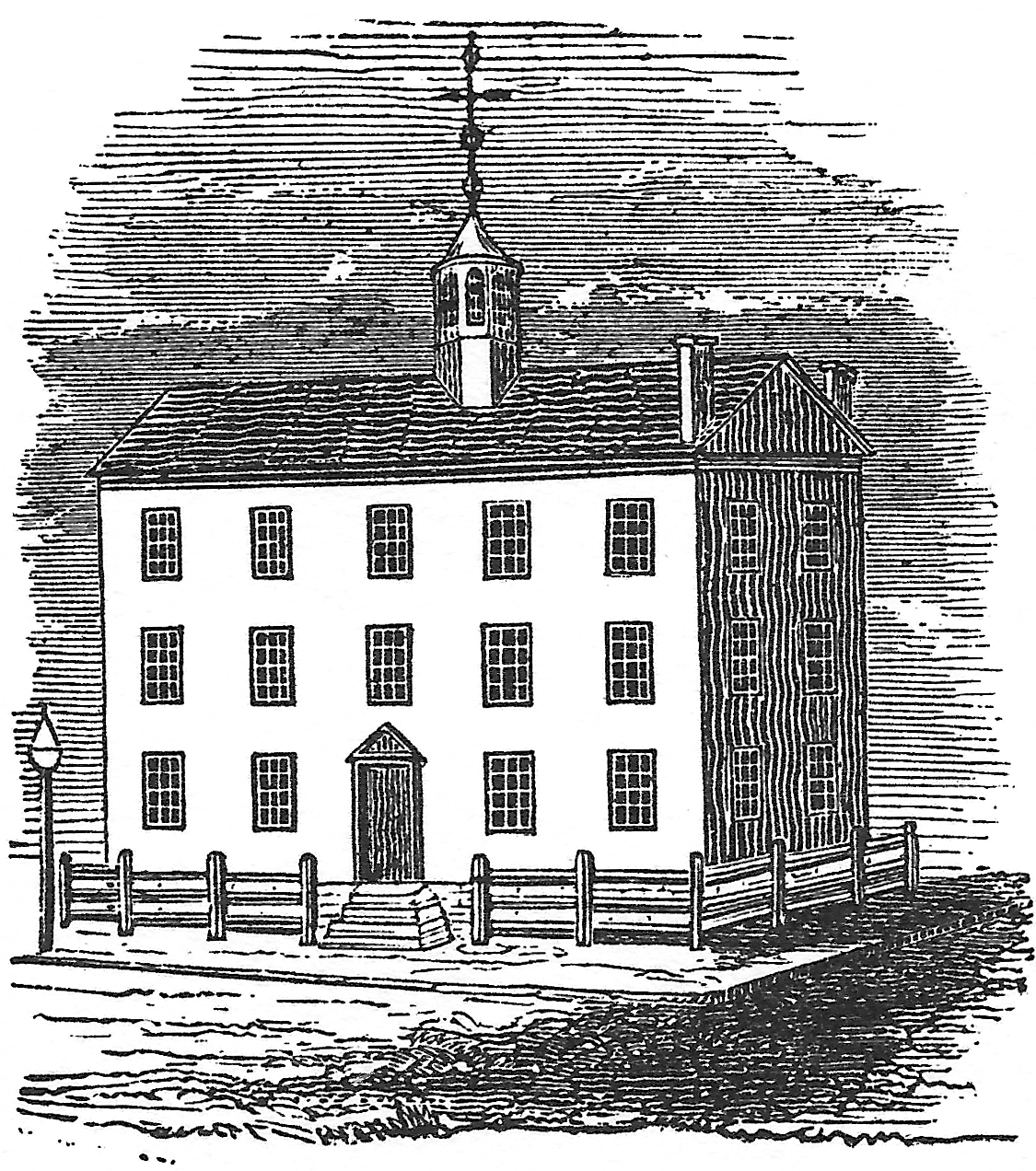
- The Old Albany City Hall (undated)

Overview
- Legislative body: New York State Legislature
- Jurisdiction: New York, United States
- Term: July 1, 1807 – June 30, 1808

Senate
- Members: 32
- President: Lt. Gov. John Broome (Clintonian)
- Party control: Clintonian

Assembly
- Members: 100
- Speaker: Alexander Sheldon (Clintonian)
- Party control: Clintonian

Sessions
- 1st: January 26 – April 11, 1808

The 31st New York State Legislature, consisting of the New York State Senate and the New York State Assembly, met from January 26 to April 11, 1808, during the first year of Daniel D. Tompkins's governorship, in Albany.

== Background ==
Under the provisions of the New York Constitution of 1777, amended by the Constitutional Convention of 1801, 32 Senators were elected on general tickets in the four senatorial districts for four-year terms. They were divided into four classes, and every year eight Senate seats came up for election. Assemblymen were elected countywide on general tickets to a one-year term, the whole Assembly being renewed annually.

In 1797, Albany was declared the State capital, and all subsequent Legislatures have been meeting there ever since. In 1799, the Legislature enacted that future Legislatures meet on the last Tuesday of January of each year unless called earlier by the governor.

State Senator Henry Huntington resigned in 1807, leaving a vacancy in the Western District.

At this time the politicians were divided into two opposing political parties: the Federalists and the Democratic-Republicans.

In 1805, the 28th Legislature had chartered the Merchant's Bank of New York which had been founded by Federalists in competition to the Democratic-Republican Bank of the Manhattan Company. The Democratic-Republican majority of the 27th Legislature had not only refused to grant a charter, but actually ordered the Merchant's Bank to shut down by May 1805. During the next session, the bank bribed enough legislators to have the charter approved, although the Democratic-Republican leaders advocated strongly against it. Gov. Morgan Lewis spoke out in favor of granting the charter what was resented by the party leaders DeWitt Clinton and Ambrose Spencer, and soon led to the split of the party into "Lewisites" and "Clintonians". The 30th Legislature had a Lewisite-Federalist majority and elected a Council of Appointment which removed most Clintonian office-holders. The Lewisites and the Federalists nominated Gov. Morgan Lewis for re-election and Thomas Storm as his running mate. The Clintonians nominated Supreme Court Justice Daniel D. Tompkins for governor, and the incumbent Lt. Gov. John Broome for re-election.

== Elections ==
The State election was held from April 28 to 30, 1807. Tompkins and Broome were elected. For the first time in State history an incumbent governor ran for re-election and was defeated.

Senators DeWitt Clinton (Southern D.), Joshua H. Brett (Middle D.) and John Tayler (Eastern D.) were re-elected. Robert Williams (Middle D.), Isaac Kellogg, John McLean, Charles Selden (all three Eastern D.); and Assemblyman Alexander Rea (Western D.) were also elected to full terms in the Senate. William Floyd (Western D.) was elected to fill the vacancy. Brett and Williams were Lewisites, the other seven were Clintonians.

== Sessions ==
The Legislature met at the Old City Hall in Albany on January 26, 1808; and adjourned on April 11.

Alexander Sheldon (Cl.) was again elected Speaker. Daniel Rodman (Cl.) was elected Clerk of the Assembly with 60 votes against 21 for the incumbent Gerrit Y. Lansing (Lew.).

On February 1, the Clintonian majority elected a new Council of Appointment which removed most Lewisite office-holders.

On February 5, the Legislature elected David Thomas (Cl.) to succeed Abraham G. Lansing (Lew.) as New York State Treasurer.

On February 8, 1808, State Senator Joseph C. Yates was appointed to the New York Supreme Court, leaving a vacancy in the Eastern District. The Legislature re-apportioned the Senate seats, and transferred one seat each from the Southern, the Middle and the Eastern (the vacant one) districts to the Western District.

On February 12, Sebastian Visscher was elected Clerk of the Senate to succeed Solomon Southwick.

On April 1, 1808, the Legislature also re-apportioned the Assembly districts. The total number of assemblymen was increased from 100 to 112. Broome and Tioga were separated with 1 seat each. Allegany, Genesee and Ontario were separated with 1 seat for Genesee, 5 for Ontario and Allegany was joined with Steuben. Jefferson, Lewis and St. Lawrence were separated with 2 seats for Jefferson and 1 each for Lewis and St. Lawrence. Cayuga, Chenango, Madison and Onondaga gained 1 seat each; New York City and Oneida gained 2 each. Dutchess, Rensselaer, Washington and Westchester lost 1 seat each. Franklin County was split from Clinton County but remained in the same Assembly district. Niagara County was split from Genesee County, and had 1 seat in the Assembly.

== State Senate ==
=== Districts ===
- The Southern District (6 seats) consisted of Kings, New York, Queens, Richmond, Suffolk and Westchester counties.
- The Middle District (8 seats) consisted of Dutchess, Orange, Ulster, Columbia, Delaware, Rockland and Greene counties.
- The Eastern District (9 seats) consisted of Washington, Clinton, Rensselaer, Albany, Saratoga, Essex and Montgomery counties.
- The Western District (9 seats) consisted of Herkimer, Ontario, Otsego, Tioga, Onondaga, Schoharie, Steuben, Chenango, Oneida, Cayuga, Genesee, Seneca, Jefferson, Lewis, St. Lawrence, Allegany, Broome and Madison counties.
Note: There are now 62 counties in the State of New York. The counties which are not mentioned in this list had not yet been established, or sufficiently organized, the area being included in one or more of the abovementioned counties.

=== Members ===
The asterisk (*) denotes members of the previous Legislature who continued in office as members of this Legislature. Alexander Rea changed from the Assembly to the Senate.

District	Senators	Term left	Party	Notes
Southern	William Denning*	1 year	Dem.-Rep./Lewisite	in April 1808, elected to the 11th United States Congress
Southern	Benjamin Coe*	1 year	Dem.-Rep./Clintonian	elected to the Council of Appointment
Southern	Thomas Thomas*	1 year	Dem.-Rep./Lewisite	
Southern	Ezra L'Hommedieu*	2 years	Dem.-Rep./Clintonian	
Southern	Jonathan Ward*	3 years	Dem.-Rep./Clintonian	
Southern	DeWitt Clinton*	4 years	Dem.-Rep./Clintonian	from February 1808, also Mayor of New York City
Middle	Samuel Brewster*	1 year	Dem.-Rep.	
Middle	Stephen Hogeboom*	1 year	Dem.-Rep.	
Middle	Peter C. Adams*	2 years	Dem.-Rep./Clintonian	elected to the Council of Appointment
Middle	James G. Graham*	2 years	Dem.-Rep./Lewisite	
Middle	Elisha Barlow	3 years	Dem.-Rep./Lewisite	
Middle	James Burt*	3 years	Dem.-Rep./Lewisite	
Middle	Joshua H. Brett*	4 years	Dem.-Rep./Lewisite	
Middle	Robert Williams	4 years	Dem.-Rep./Lewisite	
Eastern	Stephen Thorn*	1 year	Dem.-Rep./Clintonian	
Eastern	Adam Comstock*	2 years	Dem.-Rep./Clintonian	
Eastern	John Veeder*	2 years	Dem.-Rep./Clintonian	elected to the Council of Appointment;
Eastern	Joseph C. Yates*	2 years	Dem.-Rep./Clintonian	vacated his seat on February 8, 1808, upon appointment to the New York Supreme Court
Eastern	Jacob Snell*	3 years	Dem.-Rep./Lewisite	
Eastern	Isaac Kellogg	4 years	Dem.-Rep./Clintonian	
Eastern	John McLean	4 years	Dem.-Rep./Clintonian	
Eastern	Charles Selden	4 years	Dem.-Rep./Clintonian	
Eastern	John Tayler*	4 years	Dem.-Rep./Clintonian	
Western	William Floyd	1 year	Dem.-Rep./Clintonian	elected to fill vacancy, in place of Henry Huntington
Western	Jedediah Peck*	1 year	Dem.-Rep.	
Western	Nathaniel Locke*	2 years	Dem.-Rep.	
Western	John Nicholas*	2 years	Dem.-Rep./Lewisite	
Western	John Ballard*	3 years	Dem.-Rep./Clintonian	
Western	Salmon Buell*	3 years	Dem.-Rep./Clintonian	
Western	Jacob Gebhard*	3 years	Dem.-Rep./Clintonian	
Western	Nathan Smith*	3 years	Dem.-Rep./Clintonian	elected to the Council of Appointment
Western	Alexander Rea*	4 years	Dem.-Rep./Clintonian	

=== Employees ===
- Clerk: Solomon Southwick
  - Sebastian Visscher, from February 12, 1808

== State Assembly ==
=== Districts ===
- Albany County (6 seats)
- Allegany, Genesee and Ontario counties (3 seats)
- Broome and Tioga counties (1 seat)
- Cayuga County (2 seats)
- Chenango County (2 seats)
- Clinton County (1 seat)
- Columbia County (4 seats)
- Delaware County (2 seats)
- Dutchess County (7 seats)
- Essex County (1 seat)
- Greene County (2 seats)
- Herkimer County (3 seats)
- Jefferson, Lewis and St. Lawrence counties (1 seat)
- Kings County (1 seat)
- Madison County (2 seats)
- Montgomery County (5 seats)
- The City and County of New York (9 seats)
- Oneida County (3 seats)
- Onondaga County (2 seats)
- Orange County (4 seats)
- Otsego County (4 seats)
- Queens County (3 seats)
- Rensselaer County (5 seats)
- Richmond County (1 seat)
- Rockland County (1 seat)
- Saratoga County (4 seats)
- Schoharie County (2 seats)
- Seneca County (1 seat)
- Steuben County (1 seat)
- Suffolk County (3 seats)
- Ulster County (4 seats)
- Washington County (6 seats)
- Westchester County (4 seats)
Note: There are now 62 counties in the State of New York. The counties which are not mentioned in this list had not yet been established, or sufficiently organized, the area being included in one or more of the abovementioned counties.

=== Assemblymen ===
The asterisk (*) denotes members of the previous Legislature who continued as members of this Legislature.

District	Assemblymen	Party	Notes
Albany	John Brown	Federalist	
Albany	Johann Jost Dietz*	Federalist	
Albany	Jonathan Jenkins		
Albany	Stephen Van Rensselaer	Federalist	
Albany	Abraham Van Vechten	Federalist	until April 12, 1808, also Recorder of the City of Albany
Albany	Jacob Veeder*	Federalist	
Allegany, Genesee and Ontario	Amos Hall		contested; seat vacated
Allegany, Genesee and Ontario	William Ramsey	Dem.-Rep.	seated on January 29, 1808, in place of Amos Hall
Allegany, Genesee and Ontario	Philetus Swift*	Dem.-Rep.	
Allegany, Genesee and Ontario	Asahel Warner Jr.		
Broome and Tioga	Emanuel Coryell	Federalist	
Cayuga	Elijah Price		
Cayuga	Richard Townley	Dem.-Rep.	
Chenango	Peter Betts		
Chenango	Obadiah German*	Dem.-Rep./Clintonian	
Clinton	Elisha Arnold	Dem.-Rep.	
Columbia	Thomas Brodhead		
Columbia	Jacob R. Van Rensselaer	Federalist	
Columbia	Jason Warner	Federalist	
Columbia	Elisha Williams	Federalist	
Delaware	John T. More	Federalist	
Delaware	Gabriel North	Dem.-Rep.	
Dutchess	Albro Akin	Dem.-Rep./Lewisite	
Dutchess	Devoue Bailey	Dem.-Rep./Lewisite	
Dutchess	George Casey	Dem.-Rep./Lewisite	
Dutchess	Cyrenus Crosby	Dem.-Rep./Lewisite	
Dutchess	John Haight*	Dem.-Rep./Lewisite	
Dutchess	Tobias L. Stoutenburgh*	Dem.-Rep./Lewisite	
Dutchess	Martin E. Winchell*	Dem.-Rep./Lewisite	
Essex	Benjamin Pond	Dem.-Rep.	
Greene	Coenradt T. Houghtaling		
Greene	Perez Steele	Federalist	
Herkimer	Aaron Budlong	Dem.-Rep./Clintonian	
Herkimer	John M. Petrie	Dem.-Rep./Clintonian	
Herkimer	Westel Willoughby, Jr.	Dem.-Rep./Clintonian	
Jefferson, Lewis and St. Lawrence	Lewis Graves		
Kings	John Hicks*	Dem.-Rep.	
Madison	John W. Bulkley	Federalist	
Madison	Sylvanus Smalley*	Dem.-Rep.	
Montgomery	Henry Fonda	Dem.-Rep.	
Montgomery	Peter C. Fox		
Montgomery	Lawrence Gros*	Dem.-Rep.	
Montgomery	Alexander Sheldon*	Dem.-Rep./Clintonian	elected Speaker
Montgomery	Harmanus A. Vedder*		
New York	Francis Cooper*	Dem.-Rep.	
New York	Thomas Farmar		
New York	Benjamin Ferris*	Dem.-Rep.	
New York	William W. Gilbert*	Dem.-Rep.	
New York	Silvanus Miller		
New York	Henry Rutgers*	Dem.-Rep.	
New York	Solomon Townsend		
New York	James Warner*	Dem.-Rep.	
New York	Augustus Wright	Dem.-Rep.	
Oneida	Thomas R. Gold	Federalist	in April 1808, elected to the 11th United States Congress
Oneida	Henry McNeil	Federalist	
Oneida	Benjamin Wright		
Onondaga	Joshua Forman	Federalist	unsuccessfully contested by Jonathan Stanley Jr. (Dem.-Rep.)
Onondaga	John McWhorter	Dem.-Rep.	
Orange	William Ross	Dem.-Rep.	
Orange	Selah Strong	Dem.-Rep.	
Orange	Henry Tucker		
Orange	James W. Wilkin	Dem.-Rep.	
Otsego	Lemuel Fitch	Dem.-Rep.	
Otsego	Gurdon Huntington*	Dem.-Rep.	
Otsego	Robert Roseboom*	Dem.-Rep.	
Otsego	Henry Scott*	Dem.-Rep.	
Queens	Jacobus Monfoort	Dem.-Rep.	
Queens	Henry O. Seaman	Dem.-Rep.	
Queens	John W. Seaman*	Dem.-Rep.	
Rensselaer	James L. Hogeboom	Dem.-Rep./Lewisite	until March 10, 1808, also First Judge of the Rensselaer County Court
Rensselaer	Ebenezer Jones		
Rensselaer	Adam Yates*	Dem.-Rep.	
Rensselaer	Jacob Yates	Dem.-Rep.	
Rensselaer	vacant		
Richmond (New York politician)|	David Mersereau*	Dem.-Rep.	
Rockland	Samuel G. Verbryck*	Dem.-Rep./Clintonian	
Saratoga	Chauncey Belding*	Dem.-Rep.	
Saratoga	Salmon Child	Dem.-Rep.	
Saratoga	John McClelland		
Saratoga	Jesse Mott*	Dem.-Rep.	
Schoharie	Henry Shafer*	Dem.-Rep.	
Schoharie	Peter Swart Jr.*	Dem.-Rep.	
Seneca	John Sayre	Dem.-Rep./Lewisite	
Steuben	George Hornell	Federalist	
Suffolk	Israel Carll*	Dem.-Rep.	
Suffolk	Jonathan Dayton	Dem.-Rep.	
Suffolk	Thomas S. Lester	Dem.-Rep.	
Ulster	Abraham Ten Eyck DeWitt	Federalist	
Ulster	Conrad Edmund Elmendorf		
Ulster	Isaac LeFever		
Ulster	Cornelius Low		
Washington	Kitchel Bishop*	Dem.-Rep./Clintonian	
Washington	Thomas Cornell	Dem.-Rep./Clintonian	
Washington	Lyman Hall	Dem.-Rep./Clintonian	
Washington	James Hill*	Dem.-Rep./Clintonian	
Washington	Henry Mattison	Dem.-Rep./Clintonian	
Washington	Gideon Taft	Dem.-Rep./Clintonian	
Westchester	Benjamin Ferris		
Westchester	Joel Frost	Dem.-Rep.	
Westchester	Abraham Miller	Dem.-Rep.	
Westchester	Ozias Osborn		

=== Employees ===
- Clerk: Daniel Rodman
- Sergeant-at-Arms: Thomas Donnelly
- Doorkeeper: Benjamin Whipple

== Sources ==
- The New York Civil List compiled by Franklin Benjamin Hough (Weed, Parsons and Co., 1858) [see pg. 108f for Senate districts; pg. 120 for senators; pg. 148f for Assembly districts; pg. 181 for assemblymen]
- The History of Political Parties in the State of New-York, from the Ratification of the Federal Constitution to 1840 by Jabez D. Hammond (4th ed., Vol. 1, H. & E. Phinney, Cooperstown, 1846; pages 246–265)
- Election result Assembly, Cayuga Co. at project "A New Nation Votes", compiled by Phil Lampi, hosted by Tufts University Digital Library
- Election result Assembly, Dutchess Co. at project "A New Nation Votes"
- Election result Assembly, Herkimer Co. at project "A New Nation Votes"
- Partial election result Assembly, Jefferson, Lewis and St. Lawrence Co. at project "A New Nation Votes" [gives only votes from Lewis Co.]
- Election result Assembly, Kings Co. at project "A New Nation Votes"
- Election result Assembly, Onondaga Co. at project "A New Nation Votes"
- Election result Assembly, Queens Co. at project "A New Nation Votes"
- Election result Assembly, Richmond Co. at project "A New Nation Votes"
- Election result Assembly, Seneca Co. at project "A New Nation Votes"
- Election result Assembly, Washington Co. at project "A New Nation Votes"
- Election result Senate, Southern D. at project "A New Nation Votes"
- Election result Senate, Middle D. at project "A New Nation Votes"
- Election result Senate, Eastern D. at project "A New Nation Votes"
- Election result Senate, Western D. at project "A New Nation Votes"
- Election result, Assembly Clerk at project "A New Nation Votes"
- Election result, Council of Appointment at project "A New Nation Votes"
