= List of United States Supreme Court cases, volume 101 =

Supreme Court of the United States
- Interactive map of Supreme Court of the United States
- 38°53′26″N 77°00′16″W
- Established: March 4, 1789; 236 years ago
- Location: Washington, D.C.
- Coordinates: 38°53′26″N 77°00′16″W
- Composition method: Presidential nomination with Senate confirmation
- Authorised by: Constitution of the United States, Art. III, § 1
- Judge term length: life tenure, subject to impeachment and removal
- Number of positions: 9 (by statute)
- Website: supremecourt.gov

This is a list of cases reported in volume 101 of United States Reports, decided by the Supreme Court of the United States in 1879 and 1880.

== Justices of the Supreme Court at the time of 101 U.S. ==
The Supreme Court is established by Article III, Section 1 of the Constitution of the United States, which says: "The judicial Power of the United States, shall be vested in one supreme Court . . .". The size of the Court is not specified; the Constitution leaves it to Congress to set the number of justices. Under the Judiciary Act of 1789 Congress originally fixed the number of justices at six (one chief justice and five associate justices). Since 1789 Congress has varied the size of the Court from six to seven, nine, ten, and back to nine justices (always including one chief justice).

When the cases in 101 U.S. were decided the Court comprised the following nine members:

Portrait	Justice	Office	Home State	Succeeded	Date confirmed by the Senate (Vote)	Tenure on Supreme Court
	Morrison Waite	Chief Justice	Ohio	Salmon P. Chase	January 21, 1874 (63–0)	March 4, 1874 – March 23, 1888 (Died)
	Nathan Clifford	Associate Justice	Maine	Benjamin Robbins Curtis	January 12, 1858 (26–23)	January 21, 1858 – July 25, 1881 (Died)
	Noah Haynes Swayne	Associate Justice	Ohio	John McLean	January 24, 1862 (38–1)	January 27, 1862 – January 24, 1881 (Retired)
	Samuel Freeman Miller	Associate Justice	Iowa	Peter Vivian Daniel	July 16, 1862 (Acclamation)	July 21, 1862 – October 13, 1890 (Died)
	Stephen Johnson Field	Associate Justice	California	newly created seat	March 10, 1863 (Acclamation)	May 10, 1863 – December 1, 1897 (Retired)
	William Strong	Associate Justice	Pennsylvania	Robert Cooper Grier	February 18, 1870 (No vote recorded)	March 14, 1870 – December 14, 1880 (Retired)
	Joseph P. Bradley	Associate Justice	New Jersey	newly created seat	March 21, 1870 (46–9)	March 23, 1870 – January 22, 1892 (Died)
	Ward Hunt	Associate Justice	New York	Samuel Nelson	December 11, 1872 (Acclamation)	January 9, 1873 – January 27, 1882 (Retired)
	John Marshall Harlan	Associate Justice	Kentucky	David Davis	November 29, 1877 (Acclamation)	December 10, 1877 – October 14, 1911 (Died)

== Notable Case in 101 U.S. ==
=== Baker v. Selden ===
Baker v. Selden, 101 U.S. 99 (1880), is a copyright case explaining the idea-expression dichotomy. The Supreme Court held that a book did not give its author the right to exclude others from practicing what was described in the book, only the right to exclude reproduction of the material in the book. Exclusive rights to a useful art described in a book was only available via patent, not copyright.

== Citation style ==
Under the Judiciary Act of 1789 the federal court structure at the time comprised District Courts, which had general trial jurisdiction; Circuit Courts, which had mixed trial and appellate (from the US District Courts) jurisdiction; and the United States Supreme Court, which had appellate jurisdiction over the federal District and Circuit courts—and for certain issues over state courts. The Supreme Court also had limited original jurisdiction (i.e., in which cases could be filed directly with the Supreme Court without first having been heard by a lower federal or state court). There were one or more federal District Courts and/or Circuit Courts in each state, territory, or other geographical region.

Bluebook citation style is used for case names, citations, and jurisdictions.

- "C.C.D." = United States Circuit Court for the District of . . .
  - e.g.,"C.C.D.N.J." = United States Circuit Court for the District of New Jersey
- "D." = United States District Court for the District of . . .
  - e.g.,"D. Mass." = United States District Court for the District of Massachusetts
- "E." = Eastern; "M." = Middle; "N." = Northern; "S." = Southern; "W." = Western
  - e.g.,"C.C.S.D.N.Y." = United States Circuit Court for the Southern District of New York
  - e.g.,"M.D. Ala." = United States District Court for the Middle District of Alabama
- "Ct. Cl." = United States Court of Claims
- The abbreviation of a state's name alone indicates the highest appellate court in that state's judiciary at the time.
  - e.g.,"Pa." = Supreme Court of Pennsylvania
  - e.g.,"Me." = Supreme Judicial Court of Maine

== List of cases in 101 U.S. ==
Case Name	Page & year	Opinion of the Court	Concurring opinion(s)	Dissenting opinion(s)	Lower Court	Disposition
Merchants' Nat'l Bank v. United States	1 (1880)	Waite	none	none	C.C.E.D. Ark.	affirmed
Babbitt v. Finn	7 (1880)	Clifford	none	none	C.C.E.D. Mo.	reversed
Bowditch v. City of Boston	16 (1880)	Swayne	none	none	C.C.D.Mass.	affirmed
Missouri v. Lewis	22 (1880)	Bradley	none	none	Mo.	affirmed
Arthur v. Dodge	34 (1880)	Waite	none	none	C.C.S.D.N.Y.	affirmed
The Florida	37 (1880)	Swayne	none	none	Sup. Ct. D.C.	affirmed
First Nat'l Bank v. Hall	43 (1880)	Swayne	none	none	C.C.S.D. Ill.	reversed
Amoskeag Mfg. Co. v. Trainer	51 (1880)	Field	none	Clifford	C.C.E.D. Pa.	affirmed
Words, letters, figures, or symbols indicating only the quality of a good cannot be trademarked.
Central T. Co. v. National Bank	68 (1880)	Strong	none	none	C.C.N.D. Ill.	affirmed
Thomas v. West Jersey R.R. Co.	71 (1880)	Miller	none	none	C.C.E.D. Pa.	affirmed
Empire Twp. v. Darlington	87 (1880)	Harlan	none	none	C.C.S.D. Ill.	affirmed
Bast v. First Nat'l Bank	93 (1879)	Waite	none	none	C.C.E.D. Pa.	affirmed
Colorado C.R.R. Co. v. White	98 (1880)	Waite	none	none	C.C.D.C.	dismissed
Baker v. Selden	99 (1880)	Bradley	none	none	C.C.S.D. Ohio	reversed
Meguire v. Corwine	108 (1880)	Swayne	none	none	Sup. Ct. D.C.	affirmed
Washington M. Co. v. Hoffman	112 (1879)	Strong	none	Bradley	Sup. Ct. D.C.	reversed
Roberts v. Bolles	119 (1880)	Harlan	none	none	C.C.N.D. Ill.	affirmed
First Nat'l Bank v. Yankton Cnty.	129 (1880)	Waite	none	none	Sup. Ct. Terr. Dakota	reversed
Wood v. Carpenter	135 (1879)	Swayne	none	none	C.C.D. Ind.	affirmed
Pelton v. Commercial Nat'l Bank	143 (1880)	Miller	none	none	C.C.N.D. Ohio	affirmed
Worthington v. Mason	149 (1880)	Miller	none	none	C.C.E.D. Ark.	affirmed
Cummings v. Merchants' Nat'l Bank	153 (1880)	Miller	none	Waite	C.C.N.D. Ohio	affirmed
United States v. Lawson	164 (1880)	Clifford	none	none	Ct. Cl.	affirmed
United States v. Ellsworth	170 (1880)	Clifford	none	none	Ct. Cl.	affirmed
Wright v. Blakeslee	174 (1880)	Bradley	none	none	C.C.N.D.N.Y.	reversed
People's Bank v. Manufacturers' Nat'l Bank	181 (1880)	Swayne	none	none	C.C.N.D. Ill.	reversed
Ayers v. City of Chicago	184 (1880)	Waite	none	none	C.C.N.D. Ill.	affirmed
Steam E. Co. v. Hubbard	188 (1879)	Clifford	none	none	C.C.D. Conn.	affirmed
Pompton v. Cooper Union	196 (1879)	Swayne	none	none	C.C.D.N.J.	affirmed
Hatch v. Dana	205 (1880)	Strong	none	none	C.C.S.D. Ill.	affirmed
Terry v. Little	216 (1880)	Waite	none	none	C.C.W.D.N.C.	affirmed
Pittsburgh G. Co. v. City of Pittsburgh	219 (1879)	Waite	none	none	Pa.	affirmed
Pollard v. New Jersey et al. Co.	223 (1880)	Waite	none	none	C.C.D.N.J.	affirmed
Jones v. Clifton	225 (1880)	Field	none	none	C.C.D. Ky.	affirmed
May v. Sloan	231 (1879)	Bradley	none	none	C.C.N.D. Fla.	affirmed
Bank of America v. Banks	240 (1880)	Clifford	none	none	C.C.S.D. Miss.	affirmed
Watt v. Starke	247 (1880)	Bradley	none	none	C.C.E.D. Va.	affirmed
Leggett v. Avery	256 (1880)	Bradley	none	none	C.C.D. Ky.	affirmed
Simmons v. Wagner	260 (1880)	Waite	none	none	C.C.S.D. Ill.	affirmed
West v. Smith	263 (1879)	Clifford	none	none	C.C.D. Conn.	affirmed
Broder v. Natoma W. & M. Co.	274 (1879)	Miller	none	none	Cal.	affirmed
Greenleaf v. Goodrich	278 (1880)	Strong	none	none	C.C.D. Mass.	affirmed
Jeffrey v. Moran	285 (1879)	Swayne	none	none	C.C.S.D. Ohio	affirmed
Pacific R.R. v. Ketchum	289 (1880)	Waite	none	none	C.C.E.D. Mo.	affirmed
Fleitas v. Cockrem	301 (1880)	Bradley	none	none	C.C.D. La.	multiple
Ketchum v. City of St. Louis	306 (1880)	Harlan	Strong	none	C.C.E.D. Mo.	affirmed
Smith v. Ayer	320 (1880)	Field	none	none	C.C.N.D. Ill.	reversed
Union W.M. Co. v. Desper	332 (1880)	Bradley	none	none	C.C.D. Mass.	affirmed
Memphis & C.R.R. Co. v. Tennessee	337 (1880)	Waite	none	none	Tenn.	affirmed
Langford v. United States	341 (1880)	Miller	none	none	Ct. Cl.	affirmed
Creswell v. Lanahan	347 (1880)	Swayne	none	none	Sup. Ct. D.C.	affirmed
American & F.C.U. v. Yount	352 (1880)	Harlan	none	none	C.C.S.D. Ill.	reversed
Kain v. Gibboney	362 (1879)	Strong	none	none	C.C.W.D. Va.	affirmed
Phelps v. Harris	370 (1880)	Bradley	none	none	C.C.S.D. Miss.	affirmed
The Sabine	384 (1880)	Clifford	none	none	C.C.D. La.	affirmed
Gay v. Parpart	391 (1880)	Waite	none	none	C.C.N.D. Ill.	dismissal denied
Whitney v. Wyman	392 (1880)	Swayne	none	none	C.C.W.D. Mich.	affirmed
Aldridge v. Muirhead	397 (1880)	Waite	none	none	C.C.D.N.J.	reversed
International Bank v. Sherman	403 (1880)	Swayne	none	none	C.C.N.D. Ill.	affirmed
Livingston Cnty. v. Darlington	407 (1880)	Harlan	none	none	C.C.N.D. Ill.	affirmed
Mohr v. Manierre	417 (1880)	Field	none	none	C.C.E.D. Wis.	affirmed
Gunton v. Carroll	426 (1880)	Miller	none	none	Sup. Ct. D.C.	reversed
South Carolina v. Gaillard	433 (1880)	Waite	none	none	S.C.	affirmed
Wheeler v. Factors & T. Ins. Co.	439 (1880)	Bradley	none	none	C.C.D. La.	reversed
Brooks v. Burlington & S. Ry. Co.	443 (1880)	Miller	none	none	C.C.D. Iowa	affirmed
The City of Panama	453 (1880)	Clifford	none	none	Sup. Ct. Terr. Wash.	affirmed
Silliman v. United States	465 (1880)	Harlan	none	none	Ct. Cl.	affirmed
School D. v. Insurance Co.	472 (1880)	Waite	none	none	C.C.D. Neb.	re-docketed
Marquez v. Frisbie	473 (1879)	Miller	none	none	Cal.	affirmed
Woodbury P.P.M. Co. v. Keith	479 (1880)	Strong	none	none	C.C.D. Mass.	affirmed
Baker v. Humphrey	494 (1880)	Swayne	none	none	C.C.E.D. Mich.	reversed
Hall v. Russell	503 (1880)	Waite	none	none	C.C.D. Or.	affirmed
Vance v. Burbank	514 (1880)	Waite	none	none	C.C.D. Or.	affirmed
Canal Co. v. Ray	522 (1879)	Strong	none	none	Sup. Ct. D.C.	affirmed
Union P. Ry. Co. v. City of Philadelphia	528 (1880)	Clifford	none	none	Pa.	affirmed
Lovell v. Davis	541 (1880)	Miller	none	none	C.C.D. La.	affirmed
Western Union R.R. Co. v. United States	543 (1880)	Waite	none	none	C.C.E.D. Wis.	reversed
Nougué v. Clapp	551 (1880)	Miller	none	none	C.C.D. La.	affirmed
Durant v. Essex Co.	555 (1880)	Waite	none	none	C.C.D. Mass.	affirmed
Shaw v. North P.R.R. Co.	557 (1880)	Strong	none	none	C.C.E.D. Pa.	affirmed
Mercantile Nat'l Bank v. Carpenter	567 (1879)	Swayne	none	none	C.C.D. Ind.	affirmed
United States v. Dawson	569 (1879)	Miller	none	none	C.C.D. Md.	affirmed
Butterfield v. Smith	570 (1880)	Waite	none	none	C.C.D. Kan.	affirmed
Cowdrey v. Vandenburgh	572 (1880)	Field	none	none	Sup. Ct. D.C.	affirmed
Walden v. Skinner	577 (1880)	Clifford	none	none	C.C.S.D. Ga.	reversed
Hollingsworth v. Flint	591 (1880)	Harlan	none	none	not indicated	affirmed
Bechtel v. United States	597 (1880)	Swayne	none	none	C.C.S.D.N.Y.	affirmed
Crampton v. Zabriskie	601 (1880)	Field	none	none	C.C.D.N.J.	affirmed
American Bible Society v. Grove	610 (1880)	Waite	none	none	C.C.W.D. Mo.	affirmed
Gates v. Goodloe	612 (1880)	Harlan	none	none	Tenn.	reversed
Jones v. New York G. & I. Co.	622 (1880)	Swayne	none	none	C.C.E.D.N.Y.	affirmed
Mason Lumber Co. v. Buchtel	633 (1880)	Field	none	none	C.C.W.D. Mich.	affirmed
Nashville et al. R.R. Co. v. United States	639 (1880)	Waite	none	none	C.C.M.D. Tenn.	affirmed
Kennedy v. Creswell	641 (1880)	Bradley	none	none	Sup. Ct. D.C.	affirmed
Imhaeuser v. Buerk	647 (1880)	Clifford	none	none	C.C.S.D.N.Y.	affirmed
Scipio v. Wright	665 (1880)	Strong	none	none	C.C.N.D.N.Y.	reversed
Douglass v. Pike Cnty.	677 (1880)	Waite	none	none	C.C.E.D. Mo.	reversed
Case v. Beauregard	688 (1880)	Strong	none	none	C.C.D. La.	affirmed
Anthony v. Jasper Cnty.	693 (1880)	Waite	none	none	C.C.W.D. Mo.	affirmed
Dauterive v. United States	700 (1880)	Clifford	none	none	C.C.D. La.	affirmed
Moulor v. American L. Ins. Co.	708 (1880)	Strong	none	none	C.C.E.D. Pa.	reversed
Ex parte Denver et al. Ry. Co.	711 (1880)	Harlan	none	Field	C.C.D. Colo.	mandamus denied
Phillips v. Gilbert	721 (1880)	Bradley	none	none	Sup. Ct. D.C.	reversed
United States v. Kimball	726 (1880)	Waite	none	none	C.C.E.D. Ark.	affirmed
Meyer v. Hornby	728 (1880)	Miller	none	none	C.C.D. Iowa	affirmed
Stewart v. Platt	731 (1879)	Harlan	Field	none	C.C.S.D.N.Y.	reversed
Goddard v. Ordway	745 (1880)	Waite	none	none	Sup. Ct. D.C.	affirmed
Wolsey v. Chapman	755 (1880)	Waite	none	none	C.C.D. Iowa	affirmed
Litchfield v. Webster Cnty.	773 (1880)	Waite	none	none	C.C.D. Iowa	affirmed
Litchfield v. Hamilton Cnty.	781 (1880)	Waite	none	none	Iowa	reversed
Young v. Bradley	782 (1879)	Miller	none	none	Sup. Ct. D.C.	affirmed
Powers v. Comly	789 (1880)	Waite	none	none	C.C.E.D. Pa.	affirmed
Wright v. Nagle	791 (1880)	Waite	none	none	Ga.	affirmed
Trenier v. Stewart	797 (1880)	Clifford	none	none	Ala.	affirmed
Duncan v. Gegan	810 (1880)	Waite	none	none	C.C.D. La.	affirmed
Stone v. Mississippi	814 (1880)	Waite	none	none	Miss.	affirmed
United States v. Clamorgan	822 (1880)	Miller	none	none	C.C.E.D. Mo.	reversed
South et al. R.R. Co. v. Alabama	832 (1880)	Waite	none	none	Ala.	affirmed
Railroad Co. v. Turrill	836 (1880)	Waite	none	none	C.C.N.D. Ill.	affirmed
Howard v. Milwaukee et al. Ry. Co.	837 (1880)	Clifford	none	none	C.C.E.D. Wis.	affirmed
