= Senator Brayton =

Senator Brayton may refer to:

- George Brayton (New York politician) (1772–1837), New York State Senate
- Isaac Brayton (1801–1885), Ohio State Senate
