= 32nd New York State Legislature =

New York state legislative session

←	31st	33rd	→
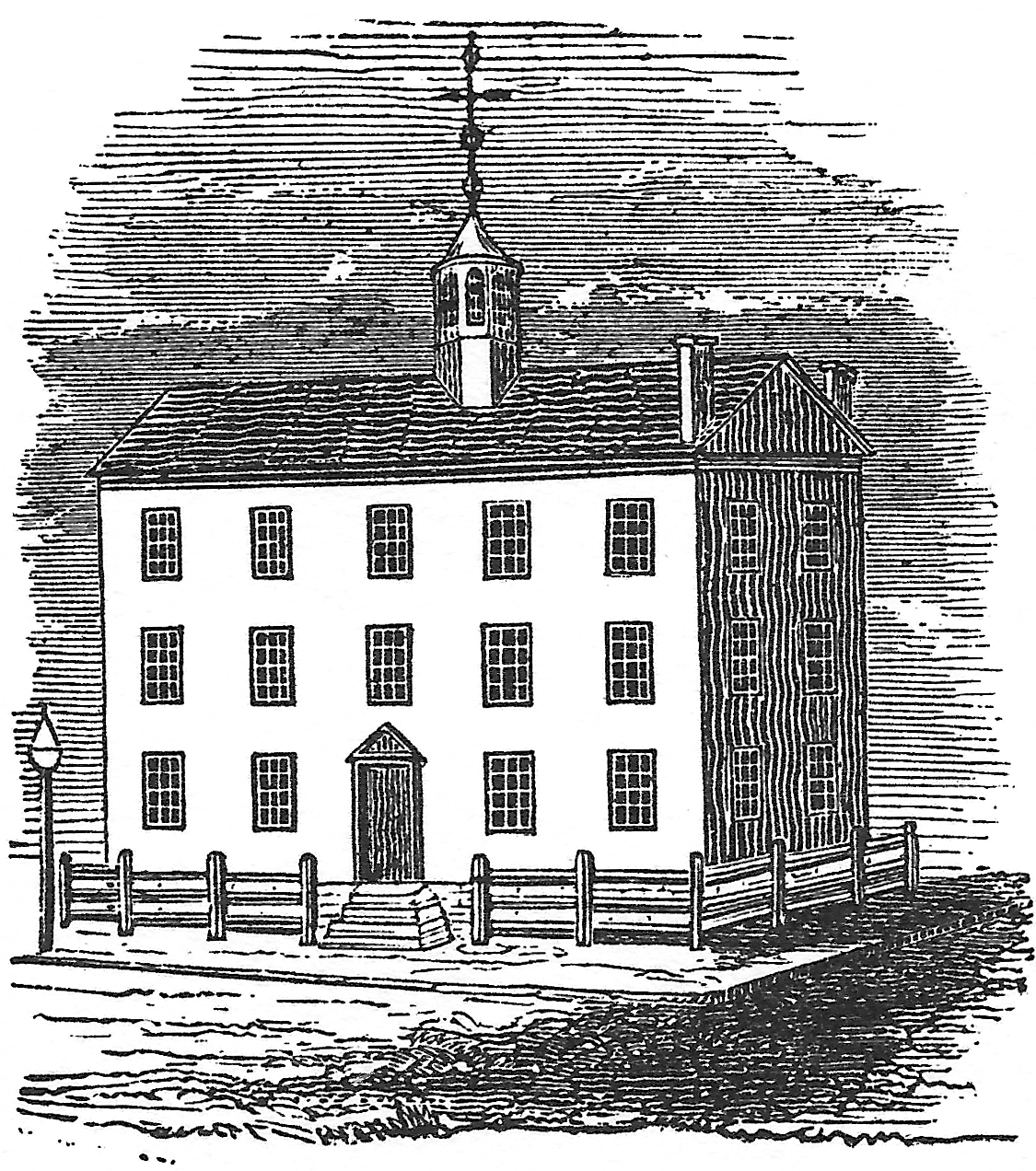
- The Old Albany City Hall (undated)

Overview
- Legislative body: New York State Legislature
- Jurisdiction: New York, United States
- Term: July 1, 1808 – June 30, 1809

Senate
- Members: 32
- President: Lt. Gov. John Broome (Dem.-Rep.)
- Party control: Democratic-Republican (31-1)

Assembly
- Members: 112
- Speaker: James W. Wilkin (Dem.-Rep.)
- Party control: Democratic-Republican (60-45)

Sessions
- 1st: November 1 – 8, 1808
- 2nd: January 17 – March 30, 1809

The 32nd New York State Legislature, consisting of the New York State Senate and the New York State Assembly, met from November 1, 1808, to March 30, 1809, during the second year of Daniel D. Tompkins's governorship, in Albany.

== Background ==
Under the provisions of the New York Constitution of 1777, amended by the Constitutional Convention of 1801, 32 Senators were elected on general tickets in the four senatorial districts for four-year terms. They were divided into four classes, and every year eight Senate seats came up for election. Assemblymen were elected countywide on general tickets to a one-year term, the whole Assembly being renewed annually.

In 1797, Albany was declared the State capital, and all subsequent Legislatures have been meeting there ever since. In 1799, the Legislature enacted that future Legislatures meet on the last Tuesday of January of each year unless called earlier by the governor.

On February 8, 1808, State Senator Joseph C. Yates was appointed to the New York Supreme Court, leaving a vacancy in the Eastern District. The Legislature re-apportioned the Senate seats, and transferred one seat each from the Southern, the Middle and the Eastern (the vacant one) districts to the Western District.

On April 1, 1808, the Legislature also re-apportioned the Assembly districts. The total number of assemblymen was increased from 100 to 112. Broome and Tioga were separated with 1 seat each. Allegany, Genesee and Ontario were separated with 1 seat for Genesee, 5 for Ontario and Allegany was joined with Steuben. Jefferson, Lewis and St. Lawrence were separated with 2 seats for Jefferson and 1 each for Lewis and St. Lawrence. Cayuga, Chenango, Madison and Onondaga gained 1 seat each; New York City and Oneida gained 2 each. Dutchess, Rensselaer, Washington and Westchester lost 1 seat each. Franklin County was split from Clinton County but remained in the same Assembly district. Niagara County was split from Genesee County, and had 1 seat in the Assembly.

At this time the politicians were divided into two opposing political parties: the Federalists and the Democratic-Republicans.

In 1805, the 28th Legislature had chartered the Merchant's Bank of New York which had been founded by Federalists in competition to the Democratic-Republican Bank of the Manhattan Company. The Democratic-Republican majority of the 27th Legislature had not only refused to grant a charter, but actually ordered the Merchant's Bank to shut down by May 1805. During the next session, the bank bribed enough legislators to have the charter approved, although the Democratic-Republican leaders advocated strongly against it. Gov. Morgan Lewis spoke out in favor of granting the charter what was resented by the party leaders DeWitt Clinton and Ambrose Spencer, and soon led to the split of the party into "Lewisites" and "Clintonians". The 30th Legislature had a Lewisite-Federalist majority and elected a Council of Appointment which removed most Clintonian office-holders. The Lewisites and the Federalists nominated Gov. Morgan Lewis for re-election but he was defeated by Clintonian Daniel D. Tompkins. The 31st New York State Legislature had a Clintonian majority and elected a Council of Appointment which removed most of the Lewisite office-holders, many of whom had been appointed during the previous year.

== Elections ==
The State election was held from April 26 to 28, 1808. Senators Benjamin Coe (Southern D.) were re-elected. Edward P. Livingston (Middle D.), David Hopkins (Eastern D.), Francis A. Bloodgood, Walter Martin, Luther Rich (all three Western D.); and Assemblymen William W. Gilbert (Southern D.) and Sylvanus Smalley (Western D.) were also elected to full terms in the Senate. Silas Halsey (Western D.) was elected to fill the vacancy. Hopkins was a Federalist, Livingston a Lewisite, the other seven were regular Democratic-Republicans.

== Sessions ==
The Legislature met at the Old City Hall in Albany on November 1, 1808, to elect presidential electors; and adjourned on November 8.

James W. Wilkin (Dem.-Rep.) was elected Speaker with 60 votes against 45 for Stephen Van Rensselaer (Fed.). Daniel Rodman (Dem.-Rep.) was re-elected Clerk of the Assembly with 61 votes against 46 for James Van Ingen (Fed.).

On November 7, 1808, the Legislature elected 19 presidential electors, all Democratic-Republicans: Ambrose Spencer, Henry Huntington, John W. Seaman, Henry Rutgers, John Garretson, Ebenezer White, Thomas Lawrence, James Tallmadge, Jonathan Rouse, Micajah Pettit, Henry Yates Jr., Benjamin Mooers, Adam B. Voorman, Thomas Shankland, William Hallock, Russell Attwater, Joseph Simonds, Hugh Jamison and Matthew Carpenter. They cast 13 votes for James Madison and 6 votes for George Clinton for president; and 13 votes for George Clinton, and 3 votes each for James Madison and James Monroe for vice president.

The Assembly met for the regular session on January 17, 1809, the Senate assembled a quorum only the next day; and both Houses adjourned on March 30.

On February 7, 1809, the Legislature elected Assemblyman Obadiah German (Dem.-Rep.) to succeed Samuel L. Mitchill (Dem.-Rep.) in the U.S. Senate.

At this time the major political controversy was the Embargo Act of 1807 which was supported by the Democratic-Republicans, but opposed by the Federalists. Most of the Lewisites eventually supported the Embargo, but assailed DeWitt Clinton in the press because he had originally opposed it. The Embargo was very unpopular and led to a revival of the Federalist Party which had been reduced to a small minority (without any member in the Senate from 1806 to 1808), but at the State election in April 1809 would already win a majority of the Assembly seats.

== State Senate ==
=== Districts ===
- The Southern District (5 seats) consisted of Kings, New York, Queens, Richmond, Suffolk and Westchester counties.
- The Middle District (7 seats) consisted of Dutchess, Orange, Ulster, Columbia, Delaware, Rockland and Greene counties.
- The Eastern District (8 seats) consisted of Washington, Clinton, Rensselaer, Albany, Saratoga, Essex, Montgomery and Franklin counties.
- The Western District (12 seats) consisted of Herkimer, Ontario, Otsego, Tioga, Onondaga, Schoharie, Steuben, Chenango, Oneida, Cayuga, Genesee, Seneca, Jefferson, Lewis, St. Lawrence, Allegany, Broome, Madison and Niagara counties.
Note: There are now 62 counties in the State of New York. The counties which are not mentioned in this list had not yet been established, or sufficiently organized, the area being included in one or more of the abovementioned counties.

=== Members ===
The asterisk (*) denotes members of the previous Legislature who continued in office as members of this Legislature. William W. Gilbert and Sylvanus Smalley changed from the Assembly to the Senate.

District	Senators	Term left	Party	Notes
Southern	Ezra L'Hommedieu*	1 year	Dem.-Rep.	
Southern	Jonathan Ward*	2 years	Dem.-Rep.	elected to the Council of Appointment
Southern	DeWitt Clinton*	3 years	Dem.-Rep.	also Mayor of New York City
Southern	Benjamin Coe*	4 years	Dem.-Rep.	
Southern	William W. Gilbert*	4 years	Dem.-Rep.	
Middle	Peter C. Adams*	1 year	Dem.-Rep.	
Middle	James G. Graham*	1 year	Dem.-Rep./Lewisite	elected to the Council of Appointment
Middle	Elisha Barlow*	2 years	Dem.-Rep./Lewisite	
Middle	James Burt*	2 years	Dem.-Rep./Lewisite	
Middle	Joshua H. Brett*	3 years	Dem.-Rep./Lewisite	
Middle	Robert Williams*	3 years	Dem.-Rep./Lewisite	
Middle	Edward P. Livingston	4 years	Dem.-Rep./Lewisite	
Eastern	Adam Comstock*	1 year	Dem.-Rep.	
Eastern	John Veeder*	1 year	Dem.-Rep.	
Eastern	Jacob Snell*	2 years	Dem.-Rep./Lewisite	
Eastern	Isaac Kellogg*	3 years	Dem.-Rep.	elected to the Council of Appointment
Eastern	John McLean*	3 years	Dem.-Rep.	
Eastern	Charles Selden*	3 years	Dem.-Rep.	
Eastern	John Tayler*	3 years	Dem.-Rep.	
Eastern	David Hopkins	4 years	Federalist	
Western	Silas Halsey	1 year	Dem.-Rep.	elected to fill vacancy, in place of Joseph C. Yates; also Seneca County Clerk
Western	Nathaniel Locke*	1 year	Dem.-Rep.	
Western	John Nicholas*	1 year	Dem.-Rep./Lewisite	
Western	John Ballard*	2 years	Dem.-Rep.	
Western	Salmon Buell*	2 years	Dem.-Rep.	
Western	Jacob Gebhard*	2 years	Dem.-Rep.	
Western	Nathan Smith*	2 years	Dem.-Rep.	
Western	Alexander Rea*	3 years	Dem.-Rep.	elected to the Council of Appointment
Western	Francis A. Bloodgood	4 years	Dem.-Rep.	
Western	Walter Martin	4 years	Dem.-Rep.	
Western	Luther Rich	4 years	Dem.-Rep.	
Western	Sylvanus Smalley*	4 years	Dem.-Rep.	

=== Employees ===
- Clerk: Sebastian Visscher

== State Assembly ==
=== Districts ===
- Albany County (6 seats)
- Allegany and Steuben counties (1 seat)
- Broome County (1 seat)
- Cayuga County (3 seats)
- Chenango County (3 seats)
- Clinton and Franklin counties (1 seat)
- Columbia County (4 seats)
- Delaware County (2 seats)
- Dutchess County (6 seats)
- Essex County (1 seat)
- Genesee County (1 seat)
- Greene County (2 seats)
- Herkimer County (3 seats)
- Jefferson County (2 seats)
- Kings County (1 seat)
- Lewis County (1 seat)
- Madison County (3 seats)
- Montgomery County (5 seats)
- The City and County of New York (11 seats)
- Niagara County (1 seat)
- Oneida County (5 seats)
- Onondaga County (3 seats)
- Ontario County (5 seats)
- Orange County (4 seats)
- Otsego County (4 seats)
- Queens County (3 seats)
- Rensselaer County (4 seats)
- Richmond County (1 seat)
- Rockland County (1 seat)
- St. Lawrence County (1 seat)
- Saratoga County (4 seats)
- Schoharie County (2 seats)
- Seneca County (1 seat)
- Suffolk County (3 seats)
- Tioga County (1 seat)
- Ulster County (4 seats)
- Washington County (5 seats)
- Westchester County (3 seats)
Note: There are now 62 counties in the State of New York. The counties which are not mentioned in this list had not yet been established, or sufficiently organized, the area being included in one or more of the abovementioned counties.

=== Assemblymen ===
The asterisk (*) denotes members of the previous Legislature who continued as members of this Legislature.

District	Assemblymen	Party	Notes
Albany	John Brown*		
Albany	John H. Burhans		
Albany	Johann Jost Dietz*	Federalist	
Albany	Jonathan Jenkins*		
Albany	Stephen Van Rensselaer*	Federalist	Minority Leader
Albany	Abraham Van Vechten*	Federalist	
Allegany and Steuben	Henry A. Townsend	Dem.-Rep.	
Broome	Eleazar Dana		
Cayuga	Henry Bloom	Dem.-Rep.	
Cayuga	Ebenezer Hewitt	Dem.-Rep.	
Cayuga	Charles Kellogg	Dem.-Rep.	
Chenango	Samuel Campbell		
Chenango	Obadiah German*	Dem.-Rep.	on February 7, 1809, elected to the U.S. Senate
Chenango	Ebenezer Wakley	Dem.-Rep.	
Clinton and Franklin	Kinner Newcomb	Dem.-Rep.	
Columbia	James Hyatt		
Columbia	Moncrief Livingston	Federalist	
Columbia	Gaius Stebbins		
Columbia	Jacob R. Van Rensselaer*	Federalist	
Delaware	Daniel Fuller		
Delaware	David St. John		
Dutchess	Samuel A. Barker	Federalist	
Dutchess	George Bloom		
Dutchess	Derick A. Brinckerhoff		
Dutchess	Ebenezer Haight	Federalist	
Dutchess	Benajah Thompson	Dem.-Rep.	
Dutchess	Jesse Thompson	Federalist	
Essex	Benjamin Pond*	Dem.-Rep.	
Genesee	William Ramsey*	Dem.-Rep.	
Greene	James Gale	Federalist	
Greene	Eliakim Reed	Federalist	
Herkimer	Aaron Budlong*	Dem.-Rep.	
Herkimer	John M. Petrie*	Dem.-Rep.	
Herkimer	Westel Willoughby, Jr.*	Dem.-Rep.	
Jefferson	David I. Andrus	Dem.-Rep.	
Jefferson	Corlis Hinds	Dem.-Rep.	
Kings	Jeremiah Johnson	Federalist	
Lewis	Judah Barnes		
Madison	Oliver Brown	Federalist	
Madison	John W. Bulkley*	Federalist	
Madison	David Van Horne	Federalist	
Montgomery	Daniel Cady	Federalist	
Montgomery	John Fay	Dem.-Rep.	
Montgomery	John Greene	Federalist	
Montgomery	Richard Van Horne	Federalist	
Montgomery	vacant		
New York	John P. Anthony		
New York	Joseph Constant		
New York	Francis Cooper*	Dem.-Rep.	
New York	James Fairlie	Dem.-Rep.	
New York	Thomas Farmar*		
New York	Frederick Jenkins		
New York	Caleb Pell		
New York	Nathan Sanford	Dem.-Rep.	
New York	Arthur Smith	Dem.-Rep.	
New York	Solomon Townsend*		
New York	Beekman M. Van Buren		
Niagara	Archibald S. Clarke	Dem.-Rep.	also Surrogate of Niagara County
Oneida	Joel Bristol		
Oneida	James Dean Sr.		
Oneida	David Ostrom	Federalist	
Oneida	John Storrs	Federalist	
Oneida	Benjamin Wright*		
Onondaga	Jacobus Dupuy	Dem.-Rep.	
Onondaga	Asahel Minor	Dem.-Rep.	
Onondaga	Barnet Mooney	Dem.-Rep.	
Ontario	Micah Brooks	Dem.-Rep.	
Ontario	Samuel Lawrence		
Ontario	Richard Leech		
Ontario	Hugh McNair		
Ontario	William Rogers		
Orange	Anthony Davis	Dem.-Rep.	
Orange	David Dill	Dem.-Rep.	
Orange	William Ross*	Dem.-Rep.	
Orange	James W. Wilkin*	Dem.-Rep.	elected Speaker
Otsego	Haviland Chase		
Otsego	Roger Kinne		
Otsego	Martin Luce		
Otsego	Henry Scott*	Dem.-Rep.	
Queens	Stephen Carman	Federalist	
Queens	David Kissam	Federalist	
Queens	William Townsend	Federalist	
Rensselaer	Derick Lane		
Rensselaer	Henry Platt	Federalist	
Rensselaer	Cornelius I. Schermerhorn	Federalist	
Rensselaer	Israel Shepard		
Richmond	David Mersereau*	Dem.-Rep.	
Rockland	Samuel G. Verbryck*	Dem.-Rep.	
St. Lawrence	Alexander Richards		
Saratoga	Nehemiah Cande		
Saratoga	Salmon Child*	Dem.-Rep.	
Saratoga	David Rogers	Dem.-Rep.	
Saratoga	Daniel L. Van Antwerp	Dem.-Rep.	
Schoharie	John Ingold Jr.	Federalist	
Schoharie	John Rice	Federalist	
Seneca	James McCall		
Suffolk	Mills Phillips		
Suffolk	Abraham Rose		
Suffolk	Daniel T. Terry		
Tioga	Emanuel Coryell*	Federalist	
Ulster	Joshua Dumond	Federalist	
Ulster	Peter Lefevre	Federalist	
Ulster	Cornelius Low		
Ulster	William Swart	Federalist	
Washington	Kitchel Bishop*	Dem.-Rep.	
Washington	James Hill*	Dem.-Rep.	
Washington	Alexander Livingston	Dem.-Rep.	
Washington	Roger Skinner	Dem.-Rep.	
Washington	Reuben Whallon	Dem.-Rep.	
Westchester	William Barker	Federalist	
Westchester	Abraham Odell	Federalist	
Westchester	Samuel Youngs	Federalist	

=== Employees ===
- Clerk: Daniel Rodman
- Sergeant-at-Arms: Thomas Donnelly
- Doorkeeper: Benjamin Whipple

== Sources ==
- The New York Civil List compiled by Franklin Benjamin Hough (Weed, Parsons and Co., 1858) [see pg. 108f for Senate districts; pg. 120 for senators; pg. 148f for Assembly districts; pg. 182 for assemblymen; pg. 321 and 324 for presidential election]
- The History of Political Parties in the State of New-York, from the Ratification of the Federal Constitution to 1840 by Jabez D. Hammond (4th ed., Vol. 1, H. & E. Phinney, Cooperstown, 1846; pages 265-275)
- Election result Assembly, Clinton and Franklin Co. at project "A New Nation Votes", compiled by Phil Lampi, hosted by Tufts University Digital Library
- Election result Assembly, Dutchess Co. at project "A New Nation Votes"
- Election result Assembly, Essex Co. at project "A New Nation Votes"
- Election result Assembly, Genesee Co. at project "A New Nation Votes"
- Election result Assembly, Greene Co. at project "A New Nation Votes"
- Election result Assembly, Jefferson Co. at project "A New Nation Votes"
- Election result Assembly, Kings Co. at project "A New Nation Votes"
- Election result Assembly, Madison Co. at project "A New Nation Votes"
- Election result Assembly, Niagara Co. at project "A New Nation Votes"
- Election result Assembly, Onondaga Co. at project "A New Nation Votes"
- Election result Assembly, Orange Co. at project "A New Nation Votes"
- Election result Assembly, Queens Co. at project "A New Nation Votes"
- Election result Assembly, Richmond Co. at project "A New Nation Votes"
- Election result Assembly, Schoharie Co. at project "A New Nation Votes"
- Election result Assembly, Washington Co. at project "A New Nation Votes"
- Partial election result Senate, Southern D. at project "A New Nation Votes" [omits votes from New York City and Suffolk Co.]
- Partial election result Senate, Middle D. at project "A New Nation Votes" gives only votes from Dutchess, Greene and Orange Co.
- Partial election result Senate, Eastern D. at project "A New Nation Votes" [gives only votes from Clinton, Franklin, Essex and Washington Co.]
- Partial election result Senate, Western D. at project "A New Nation Votes" [gives only votes from Genesee, Jefferson, Madison and Onondaga Co.]
- Election result, Assembly Speaker at project "A New Nation Votes"
- Election result, Assembly Clerk at project "A New Nation Votes"
