= Daniel Cady =

American judge

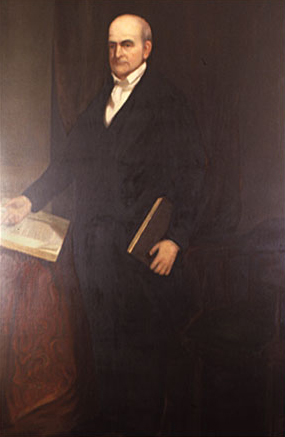

Justice of the New York Supreme Court
- In office June 7, 1847 – January 1, 1855

Member of the U.S. House of Representatives from New York's 14th district
- In office March 4, 1815 – March 3, 1817
- Preceded by: Jacob Markell
- Succeeded by: John Herkimer

Member of the New York State Assembly for Montgomery Co.
- In office February 28, 1813 – April 6, 1813
- In office July 1, 1808 – June 30, 1811

Personal details
- Born: April 29, 1773 Canaan, Province of New York, British America
- Died: October 31, 1859 (aged 86) Johnstown, New York, U.S.
- Party: Federalist
- Spouse: Margaret Livingston (m. 1801)
- Children: 11, including Elizabeth Cady Stanton
- Relatives: Daniel Cady Eaton (grandson); Theodore Weld Stanton (grandson); Harriot Blatch (granddaughter)

Daniel Cady (April 29, 1773 – October 31, 1859) was an American lawyer, politician and judge in upstate New York. The father of activist Elizabeth Cady Stanton, Judge Cady served one term as a U.S. representative from New York.

== Life ==
Cady was born in that part of Canaan, Columbia County, New York which was later split off to form Chatham, New York. He was a son of Eleazer Cady (1745–1819) and Tryphena (née Beebe) Cady (1749–1839). His siblings included Typhema Cady (1768–?), Zilpha Cady Halsey (1770–1858), Eleazer Cady (1775–1856), Ruth Cady (1777–?), and Sally Cady Eaton (1780–1816).

He was uncle to John W. Cady (1790–1854), who was also a U.S. representative from New York.

== Career ==
He learned the shoemaker's trade, but accidentally injured an eye and lost the sight of it at age 18. He then studied law, first in Canaan with Judge Whiting, then in Troy with John Woodworth at the Albany Law School. Cady was admitted to the bar in 1795, and commenced practice in Florida, Montgomery County.

After a year in Florida, he moved to Johnstown, then the county seat. As a young lawyer, he worked with such notables as Alexander Hamilton and Aaron Burr, and toward the end of his career, he served on a case with Abraham Lincoln, where they each represented clients in a land dispute associated with Beloit College.

=== Public office ===
Cady was elected as a member of the New York State Assembly in 1808, serving three consecutive terms in the 32nd, 33rd and 34th New York State Legislatures beginning on July 1, 1808, and continuing until June 30, 1811. From February to April 1813, Cady again served in the Assembly, this time the 36th New York State Legislature, while he was also the District Attorney of the Fifth District, which comprised Albany, Saratoga, Montgomery, Schoharie and Schenectady counties.

Cady was elected as a Federalist to the 14th United States Congress, holding office from March 4, 1815, to March 3, 1817. He was not a candidate for renomination and after serving in the U.S. Congress, returned to the practice of law.

From June 7, 1847, to January 1, 1855, Cady was a justice of the New York Supreme Court (4th D.) until he retired and resigned. Cady also served as an ex officio judge of the New York Court of Appeals in 1849 and 1853.

In 1856, Cady was a presidential elector on the Republican John C. Fremont ticket. Cady presided over the New York electoral college, which cast 35 votes for Fremont who lost the election to Democrat James Buchanan.

=== Legacy ===
He is considered by some the father of Fulton County, virtually engineering the county's creation in 1838 after the Montgomery county seat was moved from Johnstown to Fonda, New York. The newly established county was named after Robert Fulton, a cousin of Cady's wife.

== Personal life ==
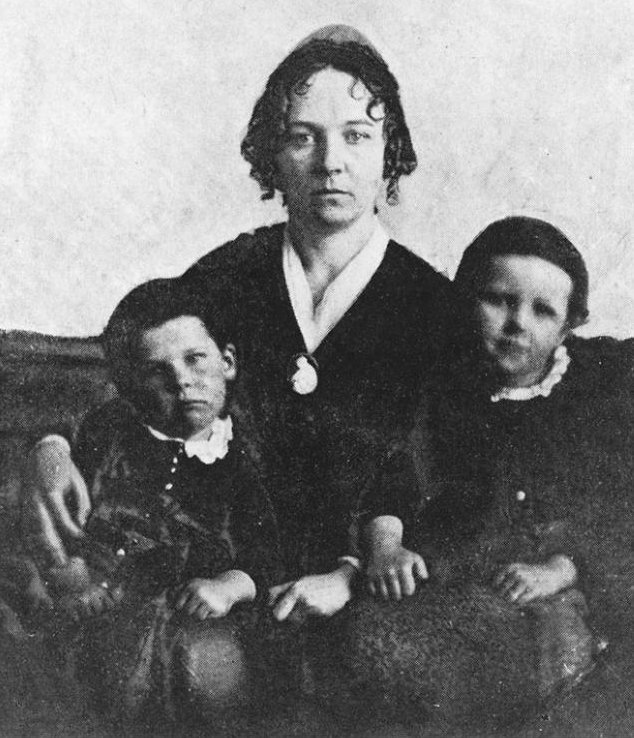
Cady's daughter Elizabeth, and two of his grandsons, c. 1848

On July 8, 1801, Cady was married to Margaret Livingston (1785–1871), the daughter of Col. James Livingston, an officer in the Continental Army during the American Revolution who fought at Saratoga and Quebec, and assisted in the capture of Major John Andre at West Point. Five of their children died in early childhood or infancy. A sixth child, a son named Eleazar, died at age 20 just before his graduation from Union College in Schenectady, New York. Only five daughters lived well into adulthood and old age. Their surviving children included:

- Tryphenia Cady (1804–1891), who married Edward Bayard (1806–1889), a Union College classmate of Eleazar and son of James Bayard, a U.S. Senator.
- Eleazer Livingston Cady (1806–1826), who died at age 20 just before his graduation from Union College.
- Harriet Elizabeth Cady (1810–1894), who married Daniel Cady Eaton (1804–1855), a son of Amos Eaton and brother of General Amos Beebe Eaton, and her first cousin.
- Elizabeth Smith Cady (1815–1902), who married Henry Brewster Stanton, brother of Robert L. Stanton, in 1840.
- Margaret Chinn Cady (1817–1901), who married Duncan McMartin (1817–1894), son of Duncan McMartin Jr., a New York State Senator.
- Catherine Henry Cady (1820–1899), who married journalist and railroad executive Samuel Wilkeson (1817–1889), son of Samuel Wilkeson, a Mayor of Buffalo.

His wife was an unusually tall woman for her time, had a commanding presence, whom their daughter Elizabeth described as "queenly." Margaret was said to have been emotionally devastated by the loss of so many children and fell into a depression, which prevented her from being fully involved in the lives of her surviving children.

Cady died in Johnstown on October 31, 1859. He was buried at Johnstown Cemetery.

=== Descendants ===
Daniel Cady's wife's sister Elizabeth, who married Peter Gerrit Smith, was the mother of Gerrit Smith, the prominent abolitionist who was married to Ann Carroll Fitzhugh. Gerrit Smith was a candidate for President of the United States in 1848, 1856, and 1860.

Through his daughter Elizabeth, Daniel Cady was the grandfather of Daniel Cady Stanton (1842–1891), Henry Brewster Stanton, Jr. (1844–1903), Gerrit Smith Stanton (1845–1927), Theodore Weld Stanton (1851–1925; a prominent journalist), Margaret Livingston Stanton Lawrence (1852–1930), Harriot Eaton Stanton Blatch (1856–1940; also a suffragist), and Robert Livingston Stanton (1859–1920).

Through his daughter Harriet, he was the grandfather of Daniel Cady Eaton (1834-1895), professor of botany at Yale College from the 1860s and the first Governor of the Society of Colonial Wars in the State of Connecticut.

== Bibliography ==
- Baker, Jean H. Sisters: The Lives of America's Suffragists. Hill and Wang, New York, 2005. ISBN 0-8090-9528-9.
- Blatch, Harriot Stanton and Alma Lutz; Challenging Years: the Memoirs of Harriot Stanton Blatch; G.P. Putnam's Sons; New York, NY, 1940.
- Griffith, Elisabeth. In Her Own Right: The Life of Elizabeth Cady Stanton. Oxford University Press; New York, NY, 1985. ISBN 0-19-503729-4.

U.S. House of Representatives
Preceded by Jacob Markell	Member of the U.S. House of Representatives from New York's 14th congressional district 1815–1817	Succeeded by John Herkimer
