= Jeremiah Johnson (mayor) =

American politician (1766–1852)

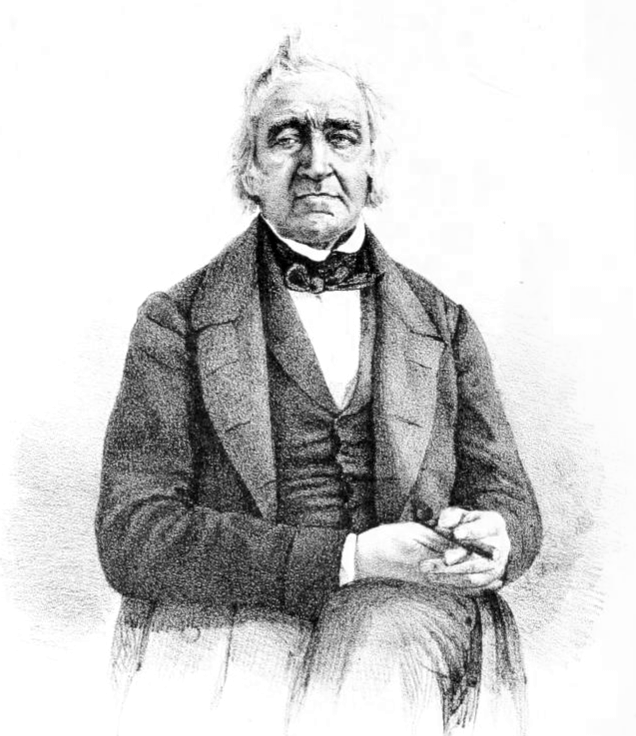

3rd Mayor of Brooklyn, New York
- In office 1837–1838
- Preceded by: Jonathan Trotter
- Succeeded by: Cyrus P. Smith

Personal details
- Born: January 3, 1766
- Died: October 20, 1852 (aged 86)
- Parent(s): Barent Johnson (1740-1782); Anna Remsen (1743-1782)

General Jeremiah Johnson (1766-1852) was the third mayor of Brooklyn, New York. He was the first president of the Saint Nicholas Society of Nassau Island.

== Biography ==
Jeremiah Johnson was born on January 3, 1766, to Barent Johnson (1740–1782) and Anna Remsen (1743–1782).

He married his first wife, Abigail Remsen, the daughter of Rem Remsen and a cousin through his mother's family, in 1787. She died at age 18 in 1788. His second wife, Sarah Rapilyea, the daughter of Tunis Rapilyea, in 1791. She died at age 53 in 1825. Together they had ten children. Two sons are Barnet Johnson and Jeromus Johnson. Two daughters are Sarah Anne Johnson who married Nicholas Wyckoff, and Susanna Johnson who married Lambert Wyckoff.

Johnson served as a trustee of Brooklyn from 1796 to 1816. He was elected town supervisor in 1800 and held the position for the next 40 years. He served in the New York State Assembly in 1809, 1810, 1840, and 1841.

Johnson died on October 20, 1852. He was buried in Green-Wood Cemetery in Brooklyn.
