= George Hall (Brooklyn) =

American politician

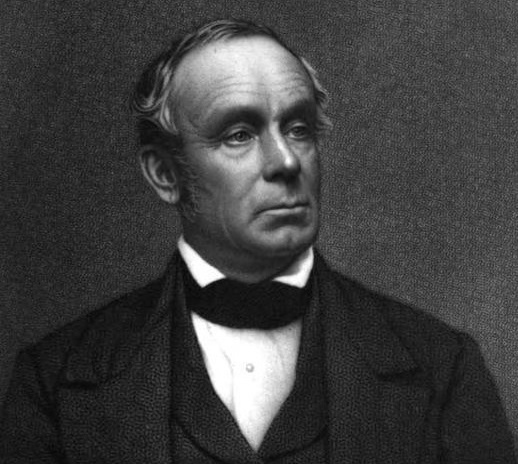
George Hall, Brooklyn Mayor.

George Hall (September 21, 1795 – April 16, 1868) was an American businessman and politician who served as the first Mayor of Brooklyn.

== Biography ==
George Hall was born in New York City, New York on September 21, 1795. When he was a child his family moved to the town of Flatbush, where his father had purchased a farm. The family later relocated to Brooklyn, then a village, and after finishing his education at Erasmus Hall Academy Hall completed training to follow his father into the trades of painter and glazier.

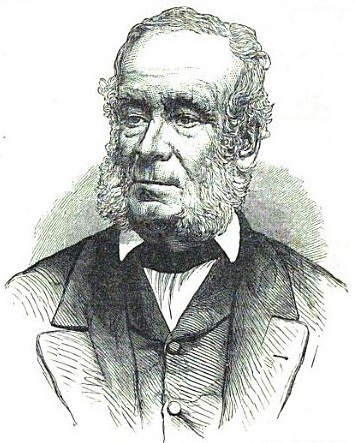
George Hall, 1st Mayor of Brooklyn.

Hall became active in politics as a Democratic-Republican, was elected a village trustee in 1826 and 1832, and village president in 1833. He later joined the temperance movement, and became a member of first the Whig Party and later the American Party (Know Nothings). In 1834 the village of Brooklyn merged with the village of Williamsburgh to form the city of Brooklyn, and Hall was elected the first mayor, serving from 1834 to 1835.

Hall ran unsuccessfully for Mayor in 1844 and 1845. In 1855 he was again elected mayor, and he served until 1856. His second term was marked by efforts to combat a cholera epidemic, and grateful citizens undertook a subscription to purchase a house for him.

He joined the Republican Party in the 1850s, and in 1861 ran unsuccessfully for city recorder. During the American Civil War he was active in efforts to recruit soldiers for the Union Army.

In his later years Hall served as president of the Fireman's Trust Insurance Company.

Hall died in Brooklyn on April 16, 1868. He was buried at Green-Wood Cemetery in Brooklyn.

Political offices
Preceded by New position	Mayor of Brooklyn; 1834 – 1835	Succeeded by Jonathan Trotter
Preceded by Edward A. Lambert	Mayor of Brooklyn; 1855 – 1856	Succeeded by Samuel S. Powell
