= Artes mechanicae =

Medieval concept of ordered practices

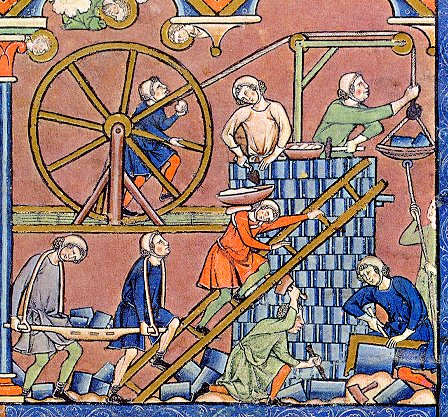
A high medieval construction site from the Maciejowski Bible

The artes mechanicae (Latin for "mechanical arts") were a medieval category of practical arts and skills, contrasted with the liberal arts. In the 9th century, Johannes Scotus Eriugena divided them into seven categories: textile production, agriculture, architecture and masonry, warfare and hunting, trade, cooking, and metallurgy.

In the 12th century, Hugh of Saint Victor, in his Didascalicon, proposed a different seven-part classification that included navigation, medicine, and the theatrical arts. His treatment gave the mechanical arts greater status by presenting them as contributing to the improvement of humanity, reflecting a broader tendency in the later Middle Ages.

== Overview ==
Johannes Scotus Eriugena (9th century) divided them into seven parts:

- vestiaria (tailoring, weaving)
- agricultura (agriculture)
- architectura (architecture, masonry)
- militia and venatoria (warfare and hunting, military education, "martial arts")
- mercatura (trade)
- coquinaria (cooking)
- metallaria (blacksmithing, metallurgy)

In his Didascalicon, Hugh of Saint Victor (12th century) includes navigation, medicine and theatrical arts instead of commerce, agriculture and cooking. Hugh's treatment somewhat elevates the mechanical arts as ordained to the improvement of humanity, a promotion which was to represent a growing trend among late medievals.

The classification of the artes mechanicae as applied geometry was introduced to Western Europe by Dominicus Gundissalinus (12th century) under the influence of his readings in Arabic scholarship.

In the 19th century, "mechanic arts" referred to some of the fields that are now known as engineering. Use of the term was apparently an attempt to distinguish these fields from creative and artistic endeavors like the performing arts and the fine arts, which were for the upper class of the time, and the intelligentsia. The mechanic arts were also considered practical fields for those that did not come from good families.

Related phrases, "useful arts" or "applied arts" probably encompass the mechanic arts as well as craftsmanship in general.

In the United States, the most famous usage of the term "mechanic arts" (and the one in which it is most commonly encountered today) is in the Morrill Land-Grant Colleges Act.

== See also ==
- Artes liberales
- Medieval technology
