= Solomon Townsend =

American politician

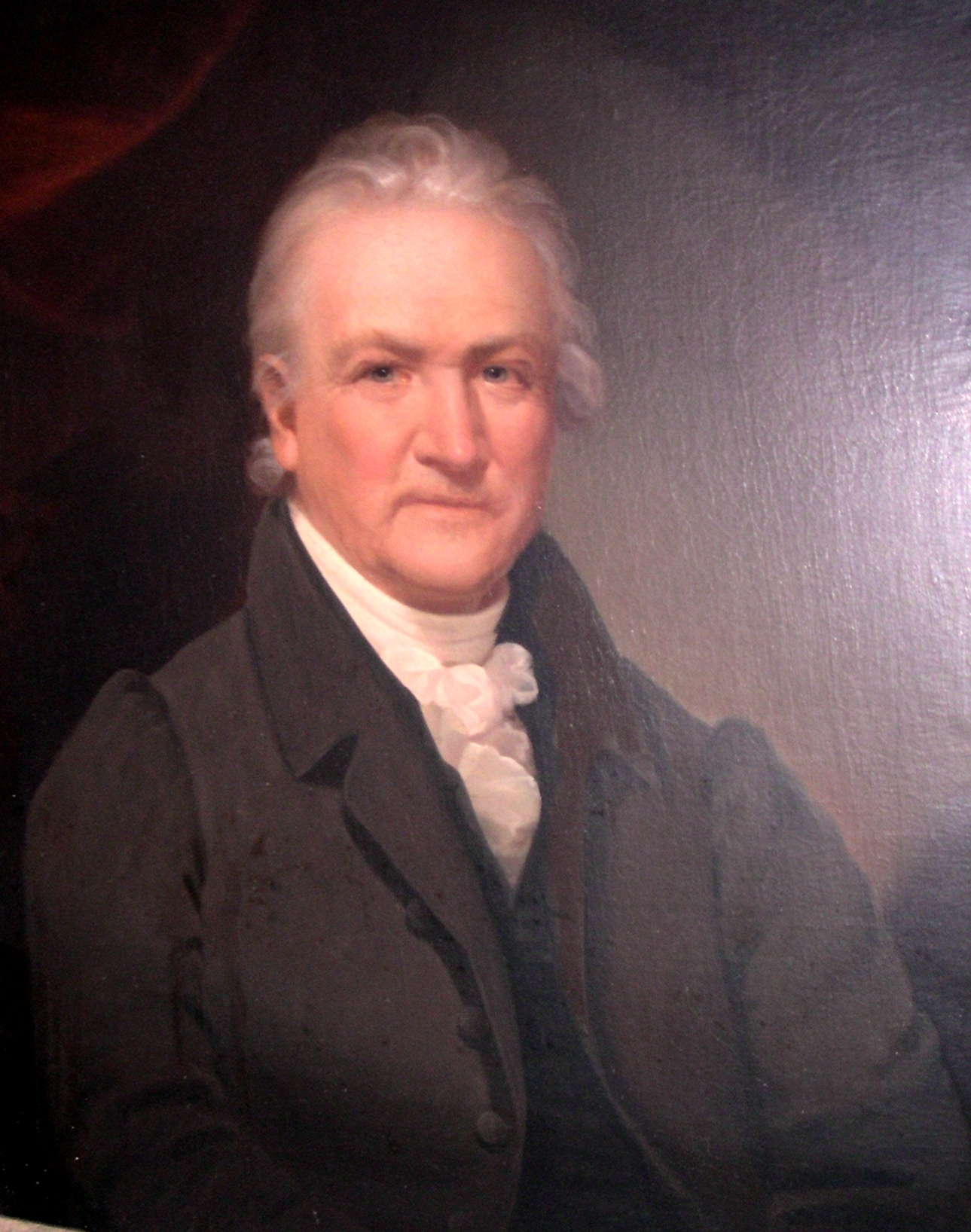
- Oil on canvas by Ezra Ames, 1808
- Born: 1746; Oyster Bay, New York
- Died: March 27, 1811 (aged 64–65)
- Known for: Ship's Captain, Iron Works, New York State Legislator
- Relatives: Robert Townsend (brother)

Solomon Townsend (1746 – March 27, 1811) was a merchant ship's captain prior to the American Revolution, owned an ironworks in New York State, and was a representative to the New York State Legislature. Stranded in London following the outbreak of hostilities, Townsend's passage back to America was facilitated by Benjamin Franklin. After the war he was a successful owner of an iron works plant, and a member of the New York State Legislature. One of his children followed him into the legislature and another was a founder of what became the New York Academy of Sciences.

== Biography ==
=== Ancestry ===
Solomon Townsend was born in Oyster Bay (hamlet), New York in 1746, the eldest son of State Senator Samuel Townsend (d. 1790) and Sarah (Stoddard) Townsend. He was descended from the Oyster Bay Townsends, a Quaker family who settled in the area in the mid-17th century, (see Henry Townsend).

=== Shipping career ===
Because of a good harbor, Oyster Bay saw a rise in the ship trade in the early 18th century and Townsend's father Samuel owned a number of merchant vessels. At age 20 his father put him in charge of a brig which he owned. Solomon worked for his father for the next 10 years captaining ships.

At the outbreak of the American Revolution Townsend was commanding the ship Glasgow, owned by Thomas Buchanan, which was berthed in London due to the cessation of trade between the two countries. The ship's owner was reluctant to put the vessel at risk by leaving the harbor, effectively stranding the crew in London. Townsend made his way to Paris where he befriended Benjamin Franklin and was received at the French court.

=== Naval commission ===
Franklin commissioned Townsend into the Continental Navy and helped him secure passage back to America on the Frigate USS Providence (1775) under the command of Commodore Abraham Whipple. Franklin provided Townsend with the following letter of safe passage:

Passey, near Paris, June 27, 1778.

I certify to whom it may concern, that Captain Solomon Townsend, of New York, mariner, hath this day appeared voluntarily before me and taken the oath of allegiance to the United States of America, according to the resolution of congress, thereby acknowledging himself a subject of the United States.

B. FRANKLIN

The Providence arrived in Boston in November 1778. With this voyage complete, Townsend ended his first career at sea. There is no evidence that he ever again sailed the ocean.

=== Ironworks ===
When Townsend returned from England and France, the American colonies were fully engaged in revolution against the British. The family's home in Oyster Bay was at the time occupied by the British Army, (see Raynham Hall Museum). Townsend, as a commissioned midshipman in the US Navy was unable to return to the town as a result. Townsend instead traveled to the home of his cousin, Peter Townsend in Newburgh NY, proprietor of the Stirling Iron Works, creator of the Hudson River Chain which kept the British Navy from sailing up the Hudson River during the war.

Townsend married his cousin Anne, Peter Townsend's eldest daughter. After the war they briefly returned to the family home Raynham Hall in Oyster Bay Long Island in New York, currently preserved as a museum, the Raynham Hall Museum. Some time later he purchased land near his father-in-law in Orange County, New York. Throughout the mid-18th century significant new reserves of iron were discovered in the area and Townsend established an extensive iron works known as the Augusta Forge in Tuxedo Park, New York, associated with his father-in-law's Sterling Iron Works.

=== Political career, death, and legacy ===
Townsend spent his later years residing in the City of New York where he oversaw his extensive business interests. In addition to Augusta Forge, he owned a producer of bar iron on the Peconic River near the town of Riverhead. In 1801 he was a member of the Constitutional Convention of 1801 which was called to clarify some issues that had arisen regarding the State Constitution of 1777. He was a member of the New York State Assembly (New York Co.) in 1804, 1804–05, 1808, 1808–09, 1810 and 1811, and died during the latter session on March 27, 1811.

Townsend left six children:

- Hannah, who married her cousin Isaiah Townsend, a wealthy merchant in Albany NY, (who in term had a son Robert Townsend (Captain) a ship captain for the US Navy in the Civil War)
- Anne, who married Effingham Lawrence, a Queens county judge; and their son was State Senator Edward A. Lawrence
- Mary, married to Edward H. Nicoll, a New York City merchant,
- Phoebe, married to James Thorne, an Albany merchant,
- Solomon Townsend Jr. a state legislator, and
- Peter S. Townsend MD, a founder of the Lyceum of Natural History, now called the New York Academy of Sciences.
