= Jonathan Trotter =

American politician

Jonathan Trotter (c. 1797 – April 5, 1865) was an English-American manufacturer and politician.

== Life ==
Trotter was born in about 1797 in Newcastle upon Tyne, England. He immigrated to the United States in 1818, settling in New York City. He worked as a morocco dresser on Roosevelt Street. In 1825, he began building a factory for leather dressing in the village of Brooklyn. In 1829, he moved to Brooklyn and his factory became a success.

In 1833, Trotter was elected a trustee of Brooklyn. In 1834, when Brooklyn was officially chartered as a city, he was elected alderman of the 4th ward. In May 1835, he was elected the second Mayor of Brooklyn. He was re-elected in 1836 and served until 1837. As mayor, he laid the cornerstone for the original Brooklyn City Hall, which was later deemed too large.

Trotter lost his fortune in the Panic of 1837. In 1840, he moved back to Manhattan. He was elected to the New York City Board of Assistant Alderman and served as president of the board in 1852 and 1853. He was a passenger on the train of the 1853 Norwalk rail accident, but survived. In 1858, he was appointed first clerk of the Street Commissioner's office. In 1859, he was appointed Collector of Assessments.

Trotter was a member of the Democratic Party and a sachem of the Tammany Society. He served as the first president of the Atlantic Bank of Brooklyn, and was vice-president of the Leather Manufacturers Bank of New York.

Trotter died on April 5, 1865. He was buried in Green-Wood Cemetery.

Political offices
Preceded by George Hall (Brooklyn)	Mayor of Brooklyn; 1835-1836	Succeeded by Jeremiah Johnson (mayor)
