= Johnstown Colonial Cemetery =

Historic cemetery in New York, United States

- U.S. National Register of Historic Places
- U.S. Historic district
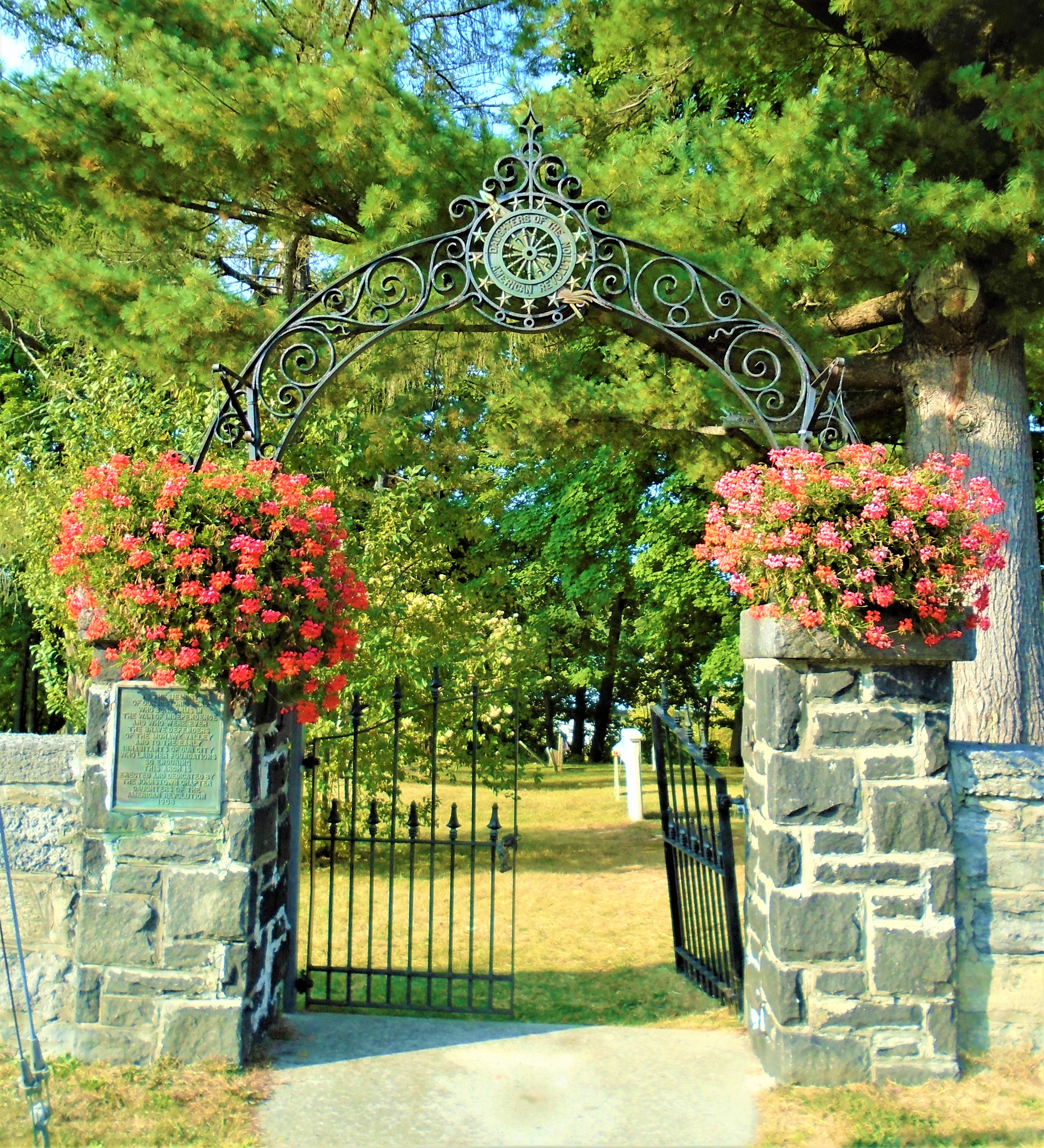
- entrance (2020)

- Location within New York Location within the United States
- Location: Jct. of W. Green and N. Market Sts., Johnstown, New York
- Coordinates: 43°0′30″N 74°22′23″W
- Area: 1.1 acres (0.45 ha)
- Built: 1766
- NRHP reference No.: 98000129
- Added to NRHP: March 9, 1998

The Johnstown Colonial Cemetery is a historic cemetery and national historic district located at West Green and North Market Street in Johnstown, Fulton County, New York. The district contains one contributing site and two contributing structures.

The cemetery was established in 1766, and the district was listed on the National Register of Historic Places in 1998.
