= Stephen Close =

Stephen Close (1374–1472) was Archdeacon of Carlisle from 1452 until 1570.

HClose was educated at King's Hall, Cambridge. He held livings at Banham, Ousby, Bugbrooke and Great Salkeld.
