= Useful art =

Practical or technological skills and methods

Useful art, or useful arts or technics, is concerned with the skills and methods of practical subjects such as manufacture and craftsmanship. The phrase was used during the Victorian era and earlier as an antonym to the performing art and the fine art.

The term "useful Arts" is used in the United States Constitution, Article One, Section 8, Clause 8, which is the basis of United States patent and copyright law:

"To promote the Progress of Science and useful Arts, by securing for limited Times to Authors and Inventors the exclusive Right to their respective Writings and Discoveries;..."

According to the US Supreme Court, the phrase "useful Arts" is meant to reference inventions. There is controversy in the Court as to whether or not this includes business methods. In the majority opinion for In re Bilski, Justice Anthony Kennedy states "the Patent Act leaves open the possibility that there are at least some processes that can be fairly described as business methods that are within patentable subject matter under §101." At the appellate level, Federal Circuit Court Judge Mayer disagreed because he did not consider the claimed business method to be within the useful arts.

== See also ==
- Artes mechanicae
