= Isaac Brayton =

American politician

Member of the Ohio House of Representatives Cuyahoga County
- In office January 7, 1856 – January 5, 1857

Associate Judge of the 9th Judicial Circuit of Ohio
- In office February 1850 – January 1852

Member of the Massachusetts House of Representatives Nantucket County

Personal details
- Born: Nantucket, Massachusetts
- Spouse(s): Love Mitchell, m. July 25, 1825
- Children: Mary Ann, George Mitchell, Lydia Mitchell, John, and Henry Swift
- Profession: Sea captain

Isaac Brayton (1801–1885) was an American sea captain and politician who served as a member of the Massachusetts House of Representatives, in the Ohio House of Representatives, as an Ohio state judge, and in the Ohio Senate.

== Early life ==
Brayton was born to Issac and Sarah in Nantucket, Massachusetts in 1801. His father died when he was young, and he was raised by a relative, Hezekiah Barnard.

== Family life ==
On July 25, 1825, Brayton married Love Mitchell, the daughter of Lydia and Peleg Mitchell (Love was the aunt of Maria Mitchell). They had five children: Mary Ann, George Mitchell, Lydia Mitchell, John, and Henry Swift.

== Ship's captain ==
In the early part of his life, Brayton became the captain of a whaling ship. On April 28, 1833, he landed the largest cargo of whale oil ever brought to Nantucket (2,824 barrels).

Brayton also took one of the first, if not the first, Christian missionaries to the Hawaiian Islands.

== Associate judgeship ==
In 1850 Brayton was elected an associate judge by the General Assembly, which at this time elected Ohio's judges, to represent Portage County on Ohio's Ninth Judicial Circuit.
