= Baker v. Selden =

- Supreme Court of the United States

Argued December 2–3, 1879 Decided January 19, 1880
- Full case name: Baker v. Selden
- Citations: 101 U.S. 99 (more) 11 Otto 99; 25 L. Ed. 841

Case history
- Prior: Appeal from the Circuit Court of the United States for the Southern District of Ohio.
- Subsequent: Reversed and remanded.

Holding
- Exclusive rights to the "useful art" described in a book are only available by patent. The description itself is protectable by copyright.

Court membership
- Chief Justice Morrison Waite Associate Justices Nathan Clifford · Noah H. Swayne; Samuel F. Miller · Stephen J. Field; William Strong · Joseph P. Bradley; Ward Hunt · John M. Harlan

Case opinion
- Majority: Bradley, joined by unanimous

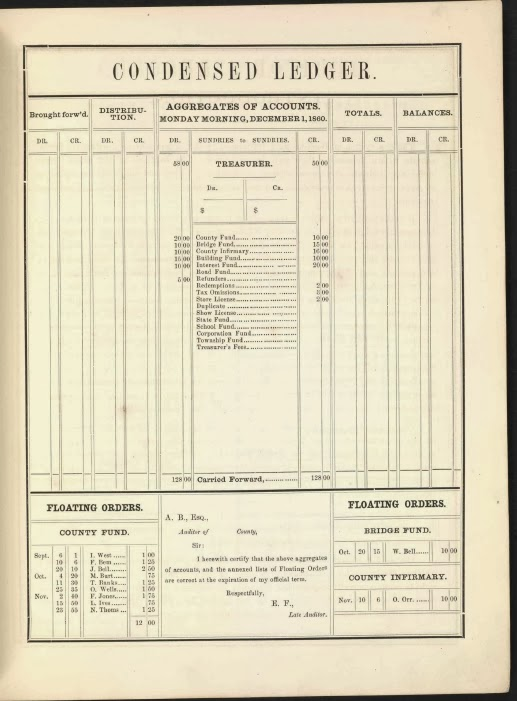
A page from Selden's condensed ledger.

Baker v. Selden, 101 U.S. 99 (1879), is a leading Supreme Court of the United States copyright case cited to explain the idea-expression dichotomy. The court held that a book did not give an author the right to exclude others from practicing what was described in the book, only right to exclude reproduction of the material in the book. Exclusive rights to a "useful art" described in a book was only available by patent.

== Background ==
In 1859, Charles Selden obtained copyright in a book he wrote called Selden's Condensed Ledger, or Book-keeping Simplified. In it the book described an improved system of book-keeping. The books contained about twenty pages of primarily book-keeping forms and only about 650 words. In addition, the books contained examples and an introduction. In the following years Selden made several other books, improving on the initial system. In total, Selden wrote six books, though, evidence suggests that they were really six editions of the same book.

Selden, however, was unsuccessful in selling his books. He originally believed he could sell his system to several counties and the United States Department of the Treasury. Those sales never happened. Selden was forced to assign his interest—an interest that apparently was returned to his wife after his death in 1871.

In 1867, W.C.M. Baker produced a book describing a very similar system. Unlike Selden, Baker was more successful at selling his book, selling it to some 40 counties within five years.

Selden's widow, Elizabeth Selden, hired an attorney, Samuel S. Fisher, a former Commissioner of Patents. In 1872, Fisher filed suit against Baker for copyright infringement.

=== Procedural history ===
The District Court of Southern Ohio held that Baker's books were "in large and material part identical with and infringements of the books of Selden system". The court ordered a permanent injunction to stop Baker from "publication, sale, or otherwise disposing of his book." The Circuit Court affirmed.

On appeal to the Supreme Court of the United States, Baker's counsel argued that Selden's work was not appropriate subject matter for copyright.

== Opinion of the Court ==
The court opinion, authored by Justice Joseph P. Bradley, held that a book did not give an author the right to exclude others from practicing what was described in the book:

[W]hilst no one has a right to print or publish his book, or any material part thereof, as a book intended to convey instruction in the art, any person may practice and use the art itself which he has described and illustrated therein.

...

The copyright of a book on book-keeping cannot secure the exclusive right to make, sell, and use account books prepared upon the plan set forth in such a book.

The court wrote extensively about the distinction between patent law and copyright law. Exclusive rights to the "useful art" described in a book was only available by patent. The description itself was protectable by copyright.

In this sense, the Court clarified Selden merely held a copyright, not a patent.

The conclusion to which we have come is, that blank account-books are not the subject of copyright; and that the mere copyright of Selden's book did not confer upon him the exclusive right to make and use account-books, ruled and arranged as designated by him and described and illustrated in said book.

The Court reversed the ruling of the Circuit Court.

The decree of the Circuit Court must be reversed, and the cause remanded with instructions to dismiss the complainant's bill.

== Subsequent developments ==
The principal holding of Baker v. Selden is codified in §102(b) of the Copyright Act of 1976. Baker is still heavily cited today, with more than 130 decisions citing it from 1984 to 2004. Although Baker v. Selden sharpened the idea-expression dichotomy, Pam Samuelson argues Baker is not the genesis of the distinction nor of the "merger" doctrine ("which holds that if an idea can only be expressed in one or a small number of ways, copyright law will not protect the expression because it has "merged" with the idea").
