= Amos T. Hall =

American lawyer, judge and civil rights leader

Amos T. Hall (October 2, 1896 – November 12, 1971) was an American judge and civil rights lawyer. He was the first African-American to be elected as a judge in Oklahoma.

== Biography ==
Hall was born in Bastrop, Louisiana. He went to schools there and graduated from Rust College in Holly Springs, Mississippi. He represented the Oklahoma Association of Negro Teachers in the 1948 equal pay suit, Freeman v. Oklahoma City School Board. He was appointed in 1969 and elected in 1970 to judgeships.

He served as president of the Tulsa branch of the NAACP for 11 years. He represented Ada Lois Sipuel in the Sipuel v. Board of Regents of University of Oklahoma in 1948 challenging "separate but equal" segregation. He was in the masonic fraternity. To avoid admitting her to the University of Oklahoma's law school after the ruling, Langston University School of Law in the state capitol was established in Oklahoma after the U.S. Supreme Court ordered Sipuel be admitted to the state's law school. She sued again and was admitted it the state's law school in 1949.

With Spencer Williams Jr. he organized the American Business and Industrial College in Tulsa for GIs. He was inducted into the Tulsa Hall of Fame in 1993.

== See also ==
- Buck Franklin (1879–1960), another black lawyer in Oklahoma
