= William W. Gilbert =

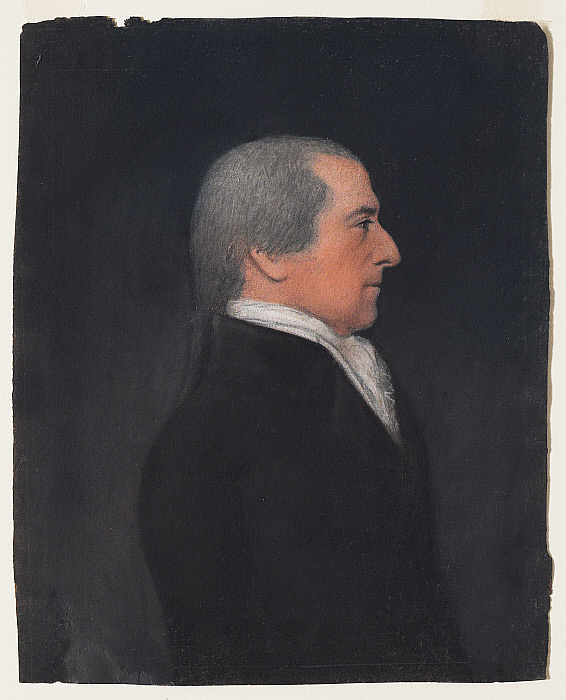
William W. Gilbert, attributed to James Sharples, c. 1795-1805

William W. Gilbert (before March 5, 1746 – February 14, 1832) was an American silversmith, active in New York City.

Gilbert was born in New York City, baptized in the Dutch Church in 1746, and married Catherine Cosine (or Cozyn) in 1767. He advertised a theft in the New York Gazette or Weekly Post-Boy, August 27, 1770, as follows: "Tuesday Night last some Villains broke into the shop of Mr. Gilbert, Silver-Smith in the Broad Way, and robbed the same of near two Hundred Pounds in Plate, &c. Diligent Search has been made after the Thieves, but we Have not heard of any discovery being made." He also advertised in the New York Gazette, 1770–1772, as a gold- and silversmith. From 1786 to 1804 he was listed in city directories as silversmith.

During the American Revolution, Gilbert was an active patriot. In early 1775 he was named one of the 60 members of the city's "Committee of Sixty" and on May 1, 1775, was elected to its "Committee of One Hundred." When the British invaded the city in August 1776, Gilbert and his family left, probably to eastern Connecticut or northern Westchester County, since a William Gilbert enrolled in Colonel John Lasher's regiment of New York militia. On November 26, 1783, the day after the British evacuated, General George Washington was presented with a document entitled "The Address of the Citizens of New York, who have returned from exile, in behalf of themselves and their suffering Brethren," signed by Gilbert as William Gilbert Jr., his father, and others.

Over time, Gilbert became a prominent and influential citizen. He was appointed from 1782 to 1788 as a city Alderman, and named a member of the Gold and Silversmiths' Society in 1786. He was Commissioner of Excise for several years, in 1786 oversaw renewal of tavern licenses. In other city offices, in 1794 he became an Associate Justice, in 1801 he was Assistant Alderman for the Seventh Ward and then in 1804 Alderman for the Eighth Ward. In 1803 he held the office of Prison Inspector. From 1788 to 1793 he served as one of the city's representatives in the State Assembly, and from 1809 to 1812 as a state senator.

Gilbert's work is collected in the Metropolitan Museum of Art, Museum of the City of New York, and Clark Art Institute.
