= Jedediah Sanger =

American landowner and politician (1751–1829)

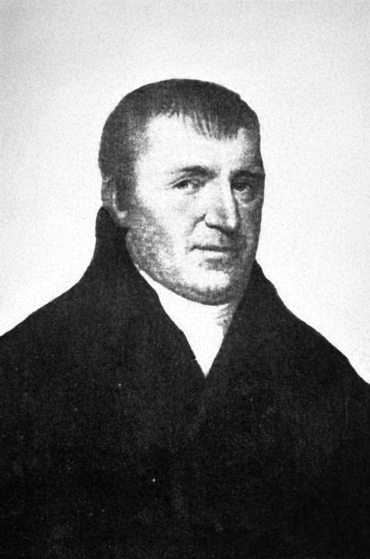

Member of the New York Senate from the Western district
- In office November 4, 1800 – April 11, 1804
- In office November 1, 1796 – April 8, 1800

Member of the New York State Assembly from Herkimer and Onondaga County

Member of the New York House of Representatives
- In office January 6, 1795 – April 9, 1795

Member of the New York State Assembly from Herkimer County

Member of the New York House of Representatives
- In office January 7, 1794 – March 27, 1794

New Hartford Town Supervisor
- In office 1789–1792

First Judge, Oneida County
- In office 1798–1810

Side Judge, Herkimer County
- In office 1791–1798

Personal details
- Born: February 28, 1751 Sherborn, Massachusetts, U.S.
- Died: June 6, 1829 (aged 78) New Hartford, New York, U.S.
- Resting place: Forest Hill Cemetery; Utica, New York, U.S. 43.077600°N 75.257950°W
- Party: Federalist
- Spouse(s): Sarah Rider (m. 1771; died 1814) Sarah B. Kissam (m. 1815; died 1825) Fanny Dench (m. 1827)
- Children: 4
- Occupation: Judge; politician; farmer; land speculator; businessman
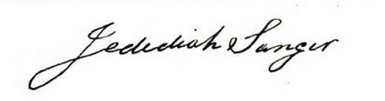
- Signature

Jedediah Sanger (February 28, 1751 – June 6, 1829) was the founder of the town of New Hartford, New York, United States. He was a native of Sherborn, Massachusetts, and the ninth child of Richard and Deborah Sanger, a prominent colonial New England family. During the Revolutionary War he attained the rank of 1st Lieutenant having fought in the Battles of Lexington and Concord, the Battle of Bunker Hill, the Siege of Boston (1776), and during the New York Campaign.

After the war, he settled in Jaffrey, New Hampshire, where he began farming, trading, and running a tavern. He was involved in several civic activities and was appointed Lt. Colonel of the New Hampshire militia. After a fire destroyed his property, leaving him bankrupt, he started over in the frontier of New York.

Sanger settled in what was then called Whitestown. He became a land agent or speculator, buying large tracts of land on both sides of Sauquoit Creek and reselling smaller lots. He was involved in land transactions, one of which involved George Washington, for the area that would become New Hartford, New York. Between 1789 and 1820, he operated a paper mill, grist mill, and saw mill there. He also purchased land at Sangerfield, Skaneateles, Chittenango, and Weedsport; He established mills in some of these towns. To facilitate travel between the settlements, Sanger was an investor in the Seneca and Chenango Turnpikes (now New York State Route 12). Sanger gave his name to a town, Sangerfield, New York, a Masonic lodge, and other places in New York. He is noted as the first settler and founder of New Hartford through two historical markers.

Among his various business pursuits, he was engaged in agriculture and manufacturing. He was a town supervisor, county judge, and state assemblyman and senator. He helped establish churches and a school.

== Early life ==
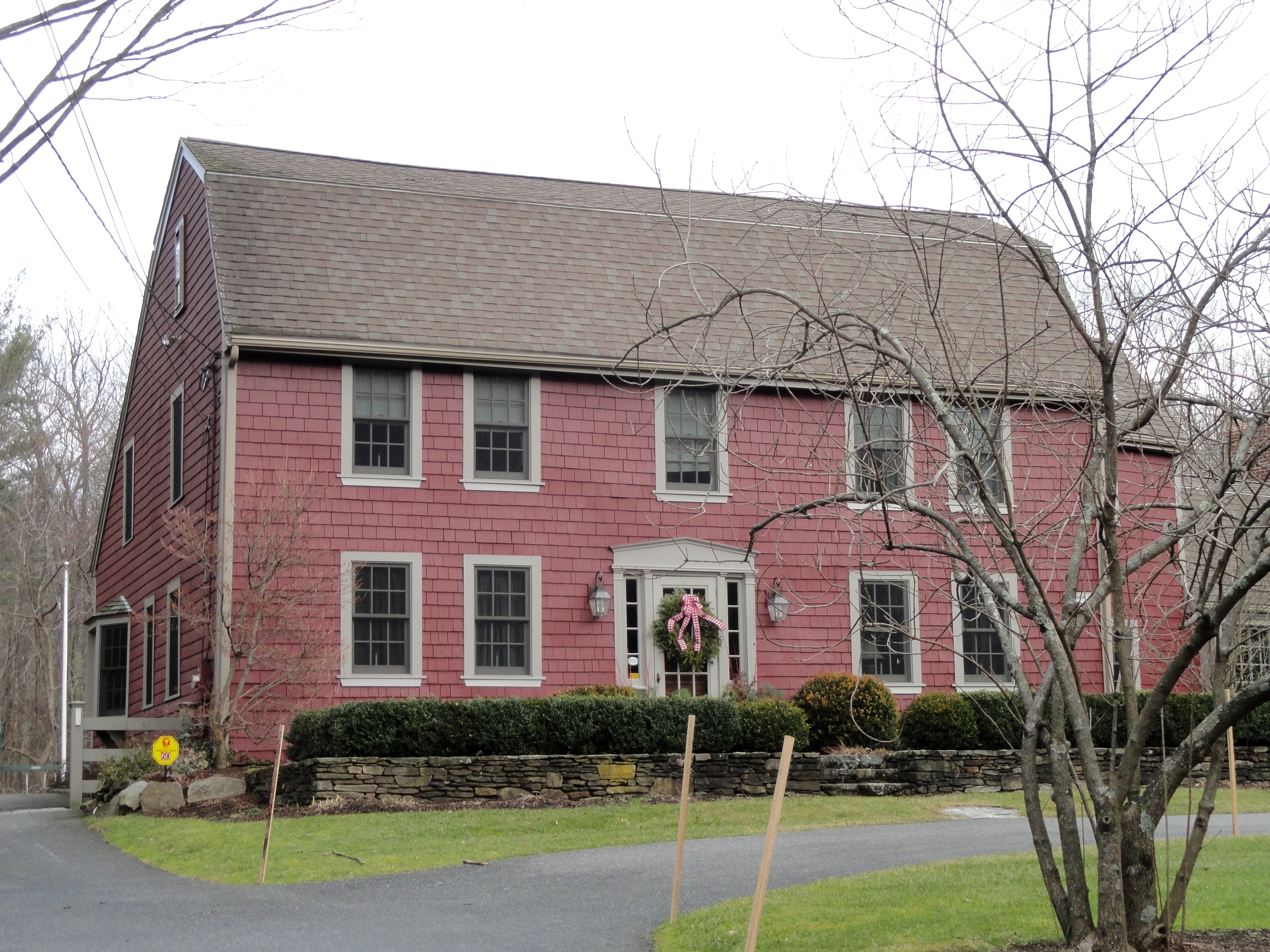
Jedediah Sanger's childhood home, Richard Sanger III House, a historic house in Sherborn, Massachusetts that is listed on the National Register of Historic Places.

Jedediah Sanger was born in Sherborn, Massachusetts on February 28, 1751. He was the ninth child of ten born to his parents, Deborah (née Morse) Sanger and Richard Sanger III (1706-1786), who married c. 1729. Like the colonial Sanger men before him, his father plied his trade as a blacksmith. (Note: His grandfather, Richard Sanger II (1666 or 67 - 1731), moved to Sherborn, Massachusetts, in 1721 with a brother to start a blacksmith business and was considered "an exemplary member of society". Sanger's great grandfather, Richard Sanger I, was born in England and emigrated from Southampton to the Massachusetts Bay Colony early in its existence in 1638. He was known to be a blacksmith in Sudbury, Massachusetts, in 1646 and died in Watertown in 1690.) Sanger III was also a successful businessman who inherited a sizable fortune from his father in 1731, which he enlarged through a lucrative trading business in Boston, real estate speculation in Maine, and the operation of a store and tavern in Sherborn. The family, one of the most prominent in Sherborn's history, lived in the Richard Sanger III House, which is listed on the National Register of Historic Places. It was built by his father, Richard Sanger III, c. 1734. (Note: After living for a short time in Boston, Richard Sanger III returned to Sherborn in 1748, purchased a large property and continued to trade in merchandise, lumber, and land.)

Sanger was educated in the local schools and worked on a farm. He may have learned the saddler's trade and worked in that business in Sherborn. His first marriage was to Sarah Rider in 1771.

== Revolutionary War ==
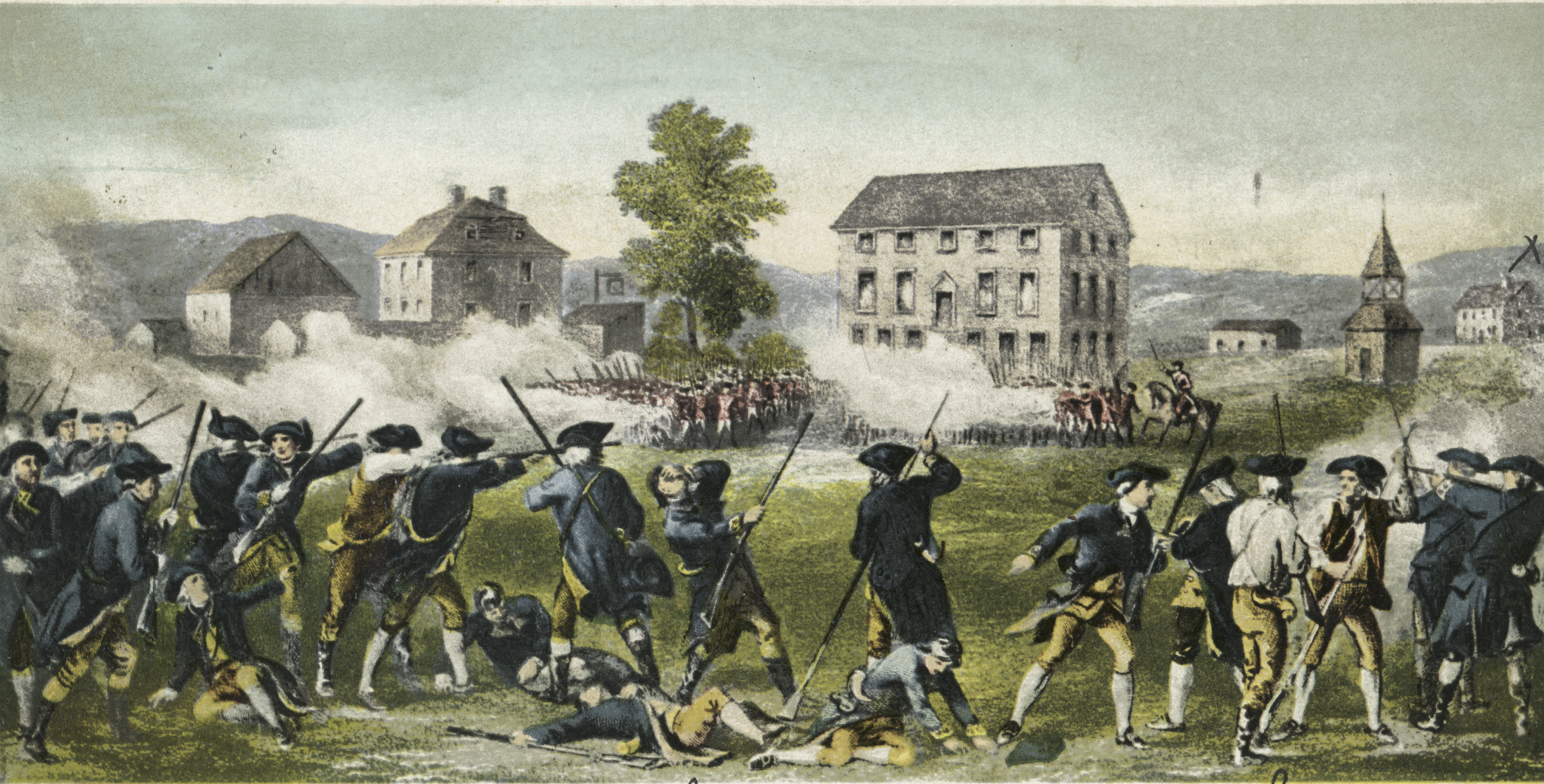
Battle of Lexington, Detroit Publishing Company, 1903–1904. During the war Sanger fought against the British at the Battles of Lexington and Concord (April 1775)

Sanger served in the American Revolutionary War, from 1775 to 1781. In his first five days service, in April 1775, he rose from the rank of private in Captain Benjamin Bullard's Company of Minutemen to 2nd Lieutenant in the 1st Massachusetts Regiment. During the war he fought against the British at the Battles of Lexington and Concord (April 1775), the Battle of Bunker Hill (June 1775), the Siege of Boston (1776), and the New York Campaign (1776). In 1779, he attained the rank of 1st Lieutenant and served in Rhode Island until March 18, 1781. (Note: Sanger's service during the Revolutionary War: Private, Lexington Alarm (Massachusetts), April 1775. Sanger was in Captain Benjamin Bullard's Company of Minutemen, Colonel Abijah Peirce's Regiment, which marched on April 19, 1775, in the initial armed conflict with the British at the Battles of Lexington and Concord. (5 days active service); 2nd Lieutenant in the 1st Massachusetts Regiment, April 24, 1775 – December 1775. Captain Joseph Morse's Company, Colonel John Paterson's Regiment, which saw action at the Battle of Bunker Hill on June 17. (3 months, 14 days active service); 2nd Lieutenant in the 7th Continental Regiment, January 1, 1776 – December 31, 1776, led by Colonel William Prescott, which saw action during the Siege of Boston and the New York Campaign.; 2nd Lieutenant in the 2nd Massachusetts Regiment, January 1, 1777 – July 21, 1779 (after the 1777 reorganization of the Continental Army). (Note: One newer directory lists Sanger as a Captain, Massachusetts Militia 1777–1781. This contradicts other sources that show his rank as Lieutenant in this timeframe.); 1st Lieutenant in Captain Lealand's 1st Company, Colonel Abner Perry's 5th Middlesex County Regiment, July 22, 1779 – March 6, 1781. Served in Rhode Island in 1780. (14 days active service); 1st Lieutenant in Captain Staples Chamberlin's Company, Colonel Isaac Dean's 4th Bristol County Regiment, March 7, 1781. Served in Rhode Island in 1781. (11 days active service))

== New Hampshire ==
Sanger moved to Jaffrey, New Hampshire, in Cheshire County, after his military service. He may have first worked there as a saddler. In 1777, he served on a committee of five to resist the annexation of a portion of Jaffrey by the neighboring Peterborough Slip. In 1782, he purchased a farm in Jaffrey near Gap Mountain. Alongside the farm, he operated a tavern and a small store on the property. From 1783 until 1786, he was selected to petition for a county road, was the town clerk, and was the moderator of one of the annual town meetings. (Note: In 1783 and 1785, he was one of the Jaffrey selectmen. In 1785 and '86, he was selected at the annual town meetings to be on commissions to petition for a county road to be built through Jaffrey connecting Rindge to Marlborough. In 1785, he was the moderator of the annual town meeting and the town clerk.) In March 1785, he was appointed the Lt. Colonel of New Hampshire militia, 23rd regiment (later the 12th).

A fire destroyed his property the night of February 27, 1784. The fire also killed Arthur Clark, a farm worker from Sherborn in the employ of Sanger. (Note: The timing of the fire was such that "two heavy loads of groceries" had been delivered the prior day and were "unloaded just in time to be destroyed.") The resulting financial issues Sanger suffered were a contributory factor in his deciding to leave the area and start over in the frontier of central New York.

== Settlement and land development in New York ==
=== New Hartford ===
Sanger arrived in the area, then known as Whitestown (the town of New Hartford was not split from Whitestown until 1827) in March 1788 at the age of 37, where he would purchase many hundreds of acres of land on both sides of Sauquoit Creek. He resold a large tract east of the creek, a year after purchasing it, to Joseph Higbee, the second settler in New Hartford. Sanger moved his family to the unincorporated village of Whitestown in March 1789 and built a saw mill there. The following year he added a grist mill. In 1805, he engaged in the manufacture of cotton goods. Sanger owned a paper mill on Sauquoit Creek, purchasing it around 1810-12 and selling it to Samuel Lyon before 1820. (Note: In the early period of New Hartford, Sanger's barn was commonly used for civic meetings, such as the organization of the first church. "The most commodious building at that time in the locality was the famous barn of Jedediah Sanger.")

Sanger built a new house in 1810, which was three stories, the third used for at least seven years as meeting space for the Masonic lodge of Freemasons, which was named Amicable Lodge No. 23, where he presided as Master.

==== Land deals ====
There is legend that Sanger bought 1,000 acres, some of which became the town of New Hartford, and then sold half to Higbee for the same price. The earliest recorded account, published by Jones in the Annals and Recollections of Oneida County in 1851, states that Sanger bought 1,000 acres (400 ha) of land for $500 (fifty cents/acre). Sanger sold the portion east of Sauquoit Creek, thought to be 500 acres (200 ha), to Joseph Higbee (or Higby), within a year, for $500 (one dollar/acre), a shrewd deal netting him the land where the majority of New Hartford's commercial development occurred for no cost. A subsequent survey showed the area Higbee purchased was actually 600 acres (240 ha). (Note: This narrative is repeated in The History of Oneida County, New York by Samuel W. Durant, 1878 which used the Jones' Annals of 1851 as a primary reference. The story was expressed in an address at the 1888 New Hartford Centennial by Henry Hurlburt, again citing Jones' Annals as his source. It is again repeated in Our County and Its People: A Descriptive Work on Oneida County, New York, Wager, 1896.) (Note: Some accounts say the land was purchased from George Washington.)

In 1889, it was reported, based upon analysis of property deed records, that Higbee purchased a 492-acre lot in December 1791 for about $1.06 per acre from Sanger, who reserved the rights to the water power of the creek. (Note: A note in Transactions of the Oneida Historical Society at Utica, New Hartford Centennial, 1889, which documented the 1888 centennial, questions the validity of the story through research of property deed records. The note cites one deed, recorded with the Oneida County clerk, for the sale of four 492 acres (199 ha) lots in Bayard's Patent, on the east of the creek, from John G. Leake to Sanger in November 1790 for £910.4 (approximately $1.16 per acre). Another deed shows the sale of one of the four 492-acre lots to Higbee in December 1791 for £209 (approximately $1.06 per acre). Therefore, the land Higbee acquired from Sanger cost him slightly less than Sanger paid for it. Sanger did reserve the rights to the water power of the creek.)

The 492-acre lot sold by Sanger to Higbee, a 183-acre lot on the west side of the creek that was sold by Sanger in July 1790, (Note: A July 1790 deed showing the sale of 183 acres (74 ha) on the west side of the creek for £73.4, or $183 ($1.00 per acre). This land, part of the village, was not conveyed to Sanger but to Thomas Williams, Ezekiel Williams, Asaph Atwater, and Nathan Kelsey.) and a 234 acres (95 ha) lot also on the west side of the creek that Sanger purchased from George Washington and George Clinton, (Note: A 234 acres (95 ha) lot on the west side of the creek, was conveyed to Sanger in July 1790 from George Washington and George Clinton for £118.10 ($296.25 or $1.27 per acre). Washington and Clinton purchased 6,071 acres (2,457 ha) of land from Marinus Willett along the Mohawk River in 1783 or '84 after touring central New York. This land was part of the original Coxe Patent (first owned by Daniel Coxe), and Washington referred to it as the lots in Coxburgh or Coxeborough township.) add up to 909 acres (368 ha) that makes up most of the original village of New Hartford.

In 1810, Sanger was one of many claimants that sought relief from the legislature to settle a dispute over the title to 1,284 acres (520 ha) arising after the land was omitted from a 1793 deed transferring the property to Philip Schuyler from the heirs of William Cosby. In 1811, they petitioned the legislature again to restrict the commissioners tasked with settling the dispute, between Cosby Patent and Coxe's or Freemason's Patent, to just define the boundary line.

Sanger sold land in New Hartford to Richard Wills, an African American who established a farm and built a house there. The house was later owned by Wills's nephew, an active abolitionist, and was a stop on the Underground Railroad.

==== Agriculture ====
Sanger continued farming various crops. At the Whitesboro Cattle Show and Fair held in October 1819, Sanger's winter wheat was judged third-best behind Benjamin Northrop of Deerfield (second place) and Reuben Gridley of Paris (first place). His oats earned first place, having yielded 84 1/4 bushels per acre, for which he was awarded a premium of $15 by the county agricultural society under a program implemented by the state Board of Agriculture "for the promotion of agriculture and domestic manufactures" under an 1819 state law. In the domestic animals category, he was awarded best boar.

=== Sangerfield ===
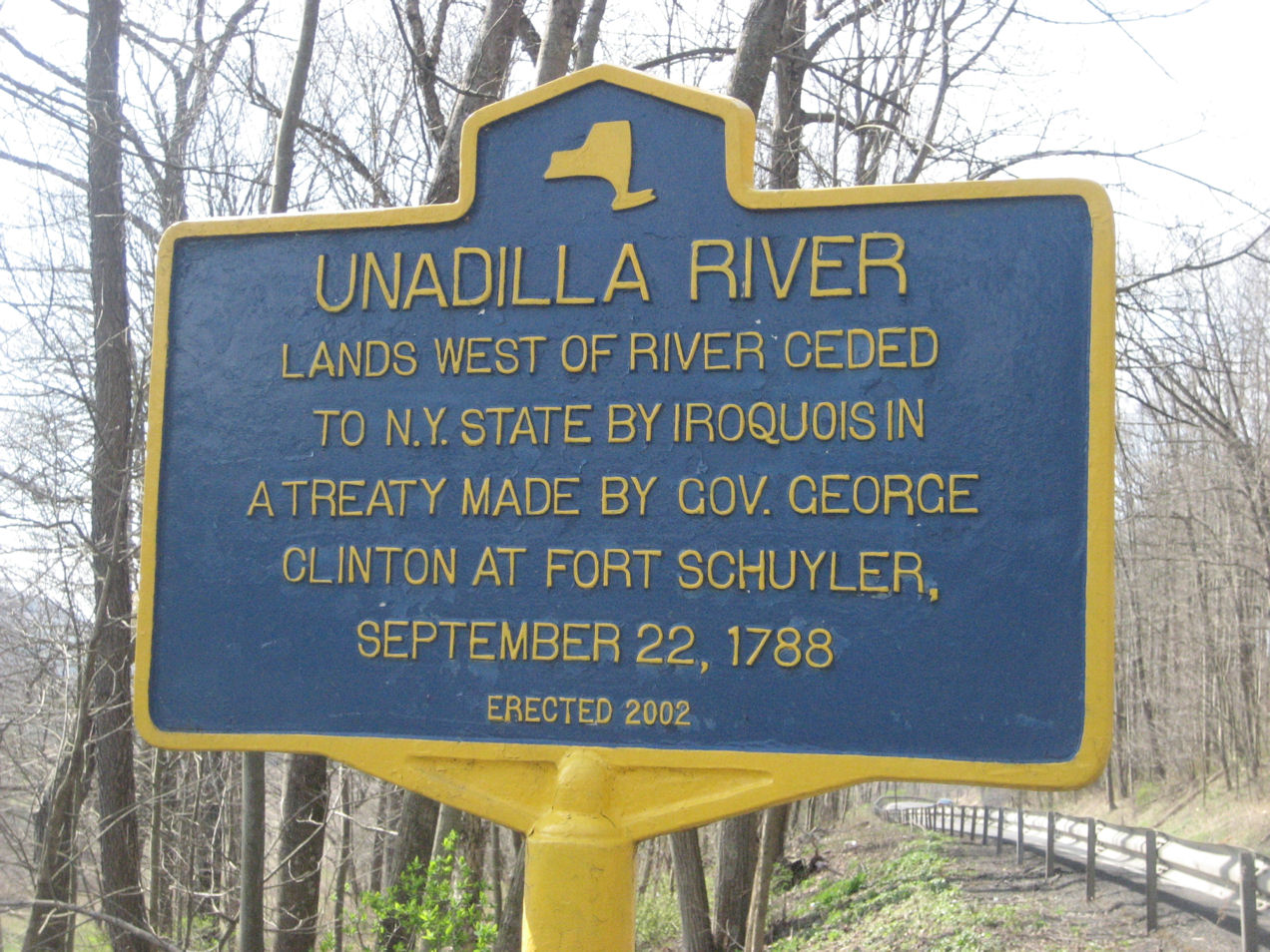
Historic marker of the Unadilla River. The lands west of the river ceded to New York State by the Oneida people of the Iroquois Nation in a treaty by Gov. George Clinton at Fort Schuyler, September 22, 1788.

In 1788, the State of New York purchased land bordering the Unadilla River from the Oneida people. Two years later, Sanger and two others, Michael Myers and John J. Morgan, contracted to buy the portion of this land known as "township 20" from the state in 1790-91 as an investment for "three shillings and three pence per acre". (Note: According to a 1929 report, Morgan actually paid for the Township 20 land and received sole title to the land that became Sangerfield. Sanger did acquire Township 20 land from Morgan that became Bridgewater, New York, and did acquire considerable holdings in Sangerfield, but not directly from the state or Morgan.)

Sanger began to sell or lease lots to settlers. He built the first sawmill there on Oriskany Creek in 1793 in what became the village of Waterville.

In 1795, the town of Sangerfield was created by the state legislature and named to honor Sanger, who in turn agreed to donate 50 acres (20 ha) "to the church of any religious denomination which should build the first house for public worship." He also agreed to donate a "cask of rum" to the first town meeting. He provided the rum and donated 25 acres (10 ha) to the Congregational Society as the first religious organization formed in town and 25 acres to the Baptists who built the first church. Many of the original settlers had disagreed with the town name, wanting it to be called "New Lisbon" instead; they later chose Lisbon for the name of the congregation.

Sanger himself farmed land in Sangerfield, as did relative William Cary Sanger much later in the century.

=== Skaneateles ===
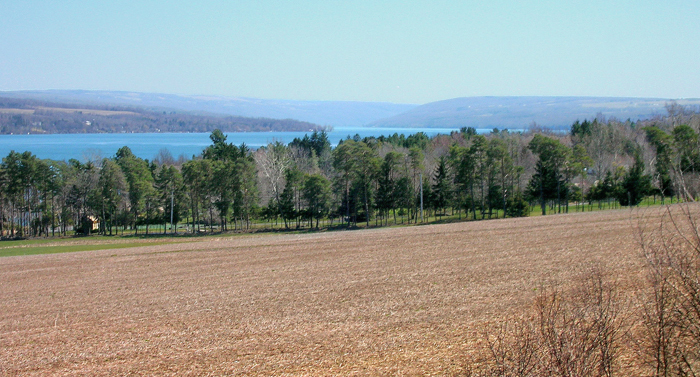
Agricultural land around Skaneateles Lake

Sanger saw the potential of the area of Skaneateles Creek at the outlet of Skaneateles Lake and purchased large amounts of land there. He built a dam about 1796 or '97 and erected the first grist and sawmills there. He divided some of his land into 100 by 330 ft (30 by 101 m) lots which he then sold as the "village plots on the north end of Skaneateles Lake", presently in the village of Skaneateles. As a controlling investor in the Seneca Road Company, he had the Seneca turnpike built though Skaneateles, which included the first bridge over the creek, built in 1800.

=== Chittenango ===
In 1812, Sanger and Judge Youngs, also of New Hartford, purchased 100 acres (40 ha) of land in Chittenango in Madison County from the bankrupt owner. They erected a grist-mill, saw-mill, and a cotton/clothing mill on Chittenango Creek. They sold the mills, the first commercial operation in this village, in 1816.

=== Weedsport ===
Sanger bought a 100-acre (40 ha) tract of land in the Onondaga Military Tract from the private who received it from the government for his revolutionary war service and resold individual lots to settlers. This land currently includes the entire village of Weedsport in Cayuga County.

== Civic leadership ==
=== Local government ===
On April 7, 1789, the first town meeting of Whitestown was held in the barn of the area's namesake, Hugh White. Sanger was selected to be the town's first supervisor and a Commissioner of Highways. (Note: In 1789 when Sanger became the first Whitestown town supervisor, Whitestown extended north to the St. Lawrence River, south to Pennsylvania and west to Lake Erie - a vast area including the entire Central New York Military Tract.) He was re-elected town supervisor in 1790 and 1791. (Note: At the second town meeting one year later, Sanger was initially elected to be one of the five town assessors, having lost the election for supervisor 50–34. But due to voting improprieties, the process was restarted the next day and Sanger was re-elected town supervisor unanimously with 119 votes. He was elected to a third term in 1791. In 1791, an act of the New York State Legislature that called for the towns of Westmoreland, Steuben, Paris, Mexico, and Peru. (Peru at the time was the land west of Mexico, not the present Peru in Clinton County.) to be split out of Whitestown also called for the first town meeting of the "new" Whitestown to be held at Sanger's house.)

Sanger was a justice in the first court held in Herkimer County in January 1794, having been named one of three "side judges" when the county was created in 1791. (Note: This session was held in Sanger's barn. This first session may have been held in the barn in October 1793.) (Note: It appears that Sanger was one of three judges fined "one pound fourteen shillings" for failing to attend a court session in January 1792. Other details of early sessions are unavailable due to records being lost in a fire in the Herkimer County clerk's office in 1804.) When Oneida County was split from Herkimer County in 1798, Sanger was named "First Judge" of the five county judges. The first Oneida County Court session was held in May 1798 at the schoolhouse near Fort Stanwix (present-day Rome), with Sanger presiding as First Judge. He was re-appointed several times through 1810, when he was no longer eligible due to his age of 60. The court was formally the Oneida County Court of Common Pleas and although judges were appointed by the Council of Appointment for five-year terms, Sanger was reappointed more often (in 1801, 1804, 1805, 1808, and 1810). (Note: In 1800, Jonas Platt, the Clerk of Oneida County, addressed the citizens of the county concerning a dispute over the boundaries of the county and the construction of a county courthouse and jail in Rome. The 1798 act establishing the county called for a courthouse and jail to be built near Fort Stanwix. Sanger would have benefited had the county seat been located near his land holdings in New Hartford. Dominick Lynch, who owned the land that became Rome, plotted out a village there named Lynchville and donated to the county land for the courthouse and jail. Sanger responded formally with a printed broadside entitled "An answer to General Jonas Platt's address to the people of the county of Oneida". There is no record that Sanger offered to donate any land for county buildings.)

=== State offices ===
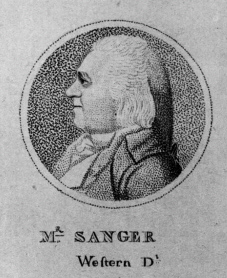
Engraving depicting Sanger in the New York State Assembly

Sanger first ran for the Assembly in 1792, losing the election by four votes (502-498). He did receive 91% of the votes from Whitestown (of which New Hartford was then still a part), but his opponent, Michael Myers, had most of the other votes from the two other towns in the district (Herkimer and German Flatts).

Concurrent with his duty as county judge, Sanger was also a member of the New York State Assembly from Herkimer County and Onondaga County in 1794-95 and served in ten more sessions of the Assembly or Senate. (Note: Sanger was elected to the state legislature for ten terms: (Note: During that time, he also ran for other offices that he lost. In 1800, Sanger also received votes 53 votes for the US House of Representatives District 10 seat, losing to Thomas Morris, and 28 votes for the US House of Representatives District 9 seat, losing to Benjamin Walker. In 1800, he lost an election held within the New York State Assembly to be one of the four senators on the Council of Appointment, the New York government body that appointed most state, county and municipal officials. In 1803, he again lost in the Assembly election for Council of Appointment. In 1804, he lost the election for a third term as senator to Henry Huntington when the Republicans prevailed over the Federalists.): 17th New York State Legislature, 1794 – 1-year term as assemblyman; 18th New York State Legislature, 1795 – 1-year term as assemblyman; 20th New York State Legislature, 1796–1797 – 4-year term as senator; 5262 votes beating 12 other Federalists and at least 15 Republicans; 21st New York State Legislature, 1798; 22nd New York State Legislature, 1798–1799; 23rd New York State Legislature, 1800; 24th New York State Legislature, 1800–1801 – 4-year term as senator; 6899 votes beating the 8 other candidates that received over 100 votes; 25th New York State Legislature, 1802; 26th New York State Legislature, 1803; 27th New York State Legislature, 1804) Sanger ran on the Federalist Party ticket.

Sanger was interested in attracting doctors to establish practices in the newly settled areas of the state, and throughout his time in the legislature he introduced numerous bills "proposing state aid to physicians who might establish themselves in the 'West'".

== Turnpikes ==
=== Seneca Turnpike ===
In March 1794, the New York State Legislature passed a law calling for the laying out and improvement of a public road from old Fort Schuyler (Utica) on the Mohawk River to the settlement of Canawaugus on the Genesee River, in as straight a line as the topography of the land would allow. Called the "Great Genesee Road", it generally followed the old Iroquois trail to Oneida.

By the end of the decade, many portions of the road were still substandard and some sections had still not been completed. The state outsourced the task of improving and maintaining the Genesee Road to the Seneca Road Company, chartered by a group of investors led by Sanger. The new Seneca Turnpike was authorized by the state on April 1, 1800, and legislated to run from the village of Utica west to the village of Cayuga in Cayuga County and on to Canandaigua in Ontario County. The 157-mile-long (253 km) road was, at the time, the longest turnpike in the state. The turnpike was to generally follow the path of the Genesee Road. Through his controlling interest in the company, Sanger had the road deviate from the Genesee Road after crossing the Mohawk River in Utica to turn southwest through New Hartford. This made the village prosper as it benefited from both the commerce brought by the road and the industry supported by the water power of the Saquoit. It was not until the completion of the Erie Canal which followed the Mohawk River valley through Utica that Utica overtook New Hartford as the commercial hub of the region.

=== Chenango Turnpike ===
In 1801, he was one of the founding members of the Chenango Turnpike Corporation. An act passed by the state legislature in March 1801 specified that the road should be built from the town of Oxford in Chenango County and follow as direct a route as possible to an intersection with the Seneca Turnpike (then called the Genesee Road) "at or near the house of Jedediah Sanger". This is the path of present New York State Route 12.

== Other businesses ==
=== Newspaper ===
Sanger, with Elijah Risley and Samuel Wells, founded the first newspaper printed in the state west of Albany, New York. The Whitestown Gazette was published in Whitestown (now New Hartford) beginning in 1793. After Sanger's involvement with the paper, it was moved to Utica, and after many mergers it became the Utica Observer-Dispatch.

=== Paris Furnace ===
Sanger was one of the principal proprietors of the Paris Furnace Company, the first manufacturing operation in the Sauquoit Valley. The forge and foundry, which went into operation in 1801, made iron products such as axes, hoes, scythes, plows, kettles commonly used at the time for making soap or potash, and hollow ware. Products were sold throughout New York and to neighboring states. He hired Gardner Avery to supervise the construction and operation of the furnace after witnessing Avery make a perilous crossing of the Hudson River, covered in thin ice, when a banker offered $100 to anyone that could deliver a package to the other side.

The site of the company and surrounding settlement, 7 miles (11 km) up the Sauquoit from New Hartford, was known as Paris Furnace, and renamed Clayville in 1848 in honor of Henry Clay. Sanger had the company incorporated in 1823, and it operated until 1832 or 1833, several years after his death.

=== Federal Company ===
The Onondaga Salt Springs Reservation was a tract of land designated by the state legislature in 1797 around a natural salt spring for the commercialization of salt production in Salina on the shores of Onondaga Lake. Production began around 1789; salt was made by boiling the brine of the water. In 1798, Sanger, Asa Danforth, and about a half-dozen other investors formed the "Federal Company", which increased production by building the first permanent building at the site for salt manufacture, building a new and bigger well, and starting a large-scale operation of 32 kettles for producing salt. This company was the largest producer at the time. Sanger sold his interest in the company after two years.

=== Bank of Utica ===
He was named one of the directors of the Bank of Utica when it opened on December 8, 1812.

== Religious organizations ==
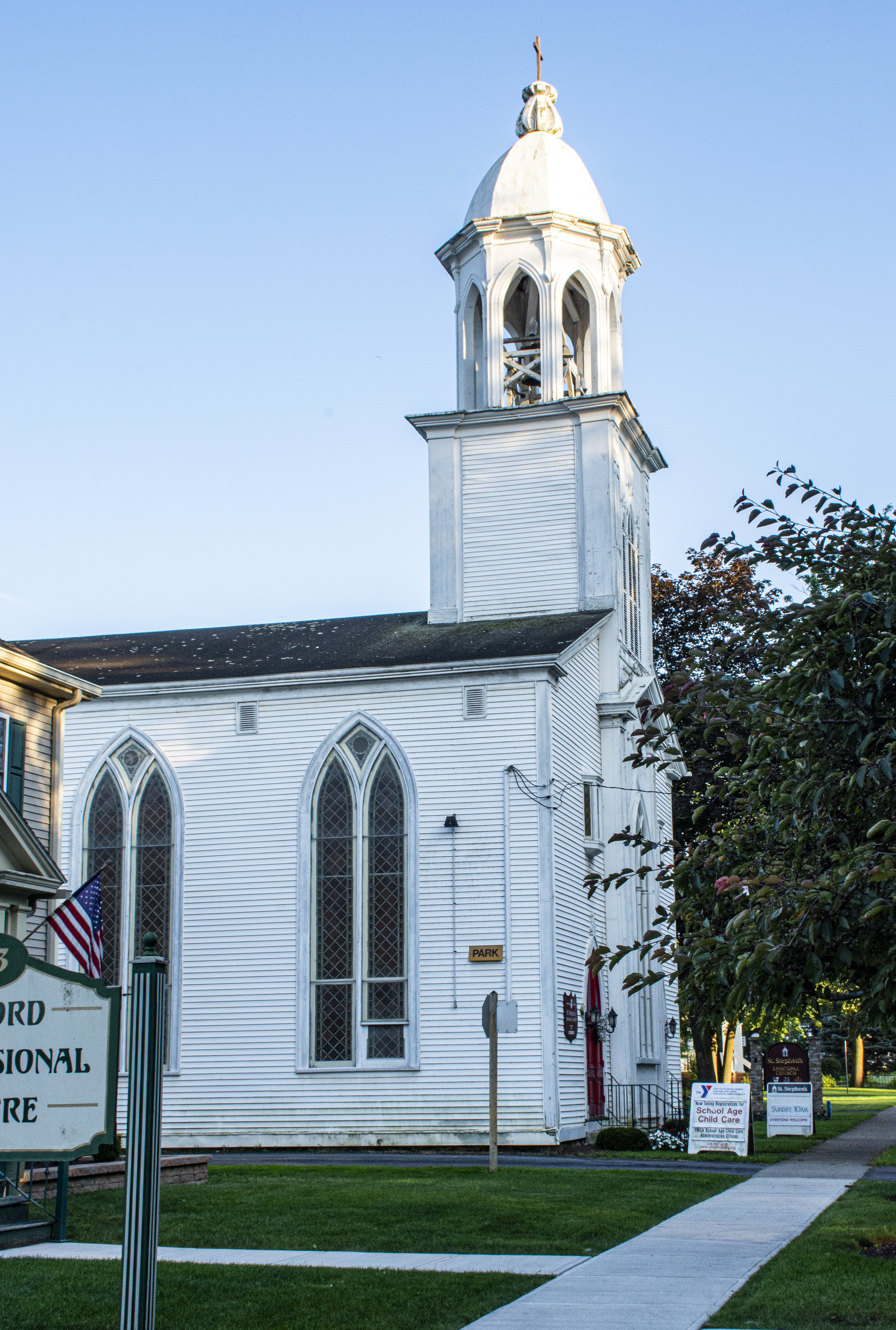
St. Stephen's Church, New Hartford, New York. The church contains a marble plaque inscribed "He, being dead, yet speaketh" in Sanger's memory.

Settlers began to come to the area that would become Whitestone in 1787, when it was wilderness. The town grew to about 3,000 by 1791. Desiring a church, on November 3, 1791, Sanger and others wrote to George Washington requesting a donation of 25 acres for a minister. The petition stated that the influence of a minister would "encourage sobriety, industry, morality, and religion among the people, and to render them good citizens." Washington agreed.

In 1791, a Congregational church was established in a meeting held in Sanger's barn, with Sanger named one of the "first class" trustees. In 1792, the congregation agreed to build a church on land donated by Sanger. Construction was completed in 1797, and the structure, since 1801 the New Hartford Presbyterian Church, is still a prominent building in the village.

In the 1820s, Sanger made significant contributions for the construction of St. Stephen's Church in New Hartford. The church contains a marble plaque inscribed "He, being dead, yet speaketh" in Sanger's memory. In 1997, it was listed on the National Register of Historic Places. According to one source, he also donated the land for this church and left funding in his will.

== Other organizations ==
Sanger was a founding member of the New Hartford masonic lodge (named Amicable Lodge) formed in 1792. He was elected an officer of the Grand (state) chapter at its organizational meeting held in January 1799 in Albany, where DeWitt Clinton presided as Grand High Priest.

In 1793, Samuel Kirkland established Hamilton Oneida Academy in Clinton to educate and civilize the Iroquois (Five Nations) Indians in the region. Sanger made a large donation to the school and was named a trustee. When the school was chartered as Hamilton College in 1812, he was again named a trustee.

== Family ==
=== Immediate ===
Sanger was married to Sarah Rider from May 1771 to her death in September 1814 and to Sarah B. Kissam from August 1815 until her death due to apoplexy on April 22, 1825. He married his third wife, Fanny Dench of Washington, D.C., on October 3, 1827. She survived him and died in 1842.

Sanger had four children with his first wife Sarah Rider. The first was Sarah, born in 1772, who died just after her fifth birthday. His second daughter, also named Sarah, was born in 1778. He also had two sons, Walter and Zedekiah, born in 1781 and 1783, respectively, who both died in 1802.

Sarah, the only one of his children that survived him, married John Eames. As a wedding gift, Sanger built them a house in New Hartford, now known as the Eames mansion. Sarah and James had nine children, all of whom were born in Sanger's lifetime. Sarah died in 1861 at age 83 in New Hartford.

=== Notable relatives ===
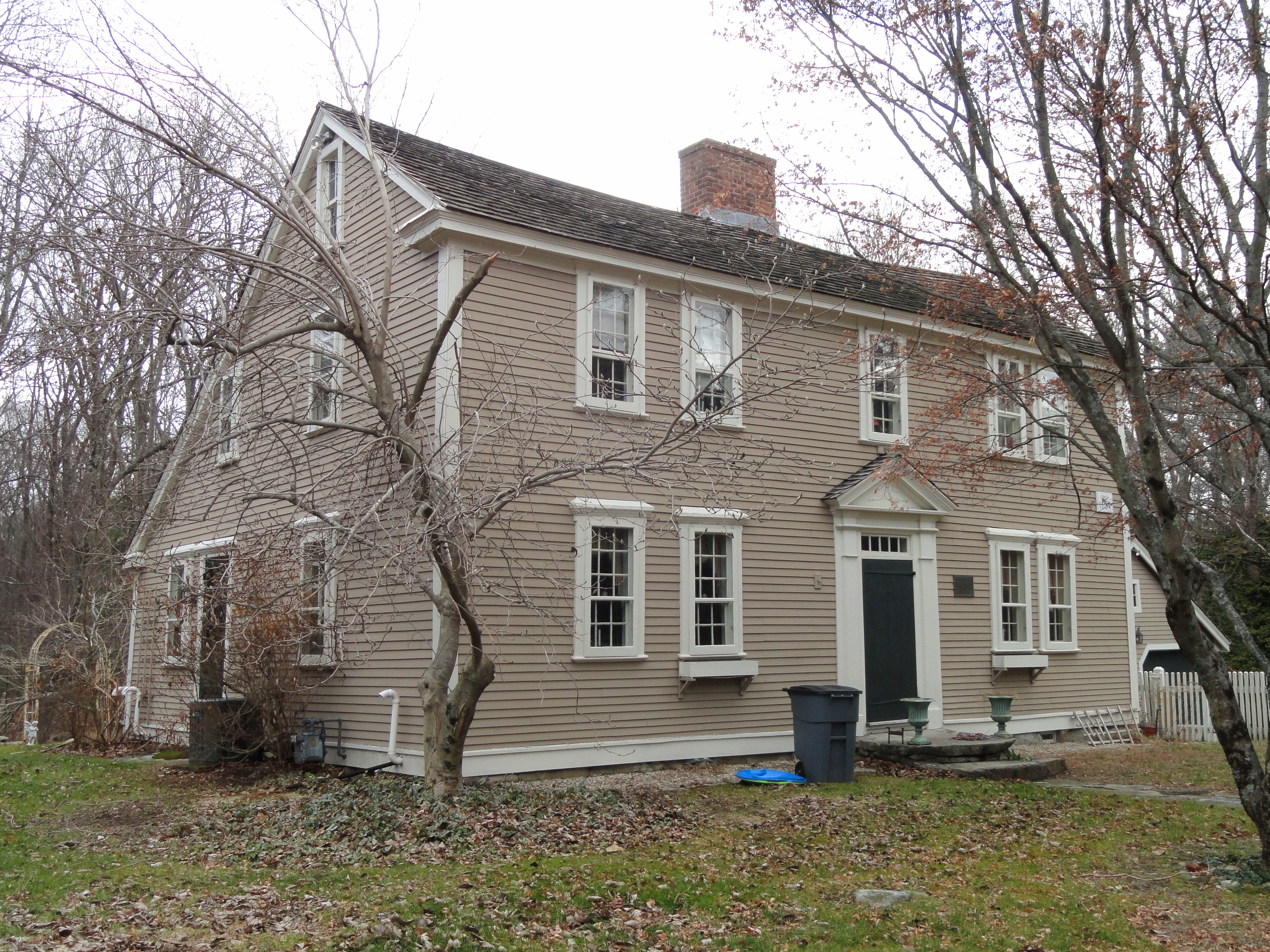
Sanger's only younger sibling, Asa Sanger (born 1753), owned the Asa Sanger House that is listed on the National Register of Historic Places

Sanger's younger brother, Asa Sanger (born 1753), came to own the Asa Sanger House which is listed on the National Register of Historic Places.

A nephew, Colonel Calvin Sanger (1768–1835), the son of his brother Samuel, bought all the land in Sangerville, Maine c. 1800 which changed its name from Amestown to Sangerville when it was incorporated in 1814. Sanger's nephew Zedekiah, son of his brother Zedekiah, was an early settler in New Hartford, the father of Henry Sanger (born in New Hartford) whose son, William Cary Sanger, was a member of the New York State Assembly from 1895 to 1897 and the United States Assistant Secretary of War from 1901 to 1903.

== Death and legacy ==
Gravestone inscription

Sacred
to the memory
of
Hon. Jedediah Sanger
who died June 6,
A.D. 1829,
The founder of New Hartford.
His charities are widely extended,
And his munificence has reared
And supported several edifices
Devoted to the service of his
Maker.
His virtues are indelibly impressed
upon the
Hearts of his Countrymen.

Sanger died on June 6, 1829, in his home in New Hartford at the age of 79. He was originally buried in the New Hartford village cemetery, then moved to a family burial plot on his farm, and finally was interred at the Forest Hill Cemetery in Utica in a family plot with his second and third wives and several of his children. The original gravestone, almost illegible, was supplemented with a new one in 2007.

There are two New York Historic Markers that commemorate Sanger. One marks the founding of New Hartford ("Jedediah Sanger Founded New Hartford In 1788 By Purchasing 1000 Acres Of Land And Settling Here With His Family") and one the 1790 grist mill ("A Grist Mill Was Built 350 Feet East Of Here In 1790 By Jedediah Sanger, First Settler And Founder Of New Hartford").

Sangertown Square, a regional shopping mall in New Hartford, is named after him, as is the New Hartford High School yearbook, the "Jedediac". There is a street named Sanger Avenue in the village of New Hartford. A Masonic lodge was formed in Waterville and named the Sanger Lodge No. 129.

Sanger's family bible is in the possession of the Oneida County Historical Society and is still used for ceremonial purposes, such as when the new town supervisor took the oath of office in 2010.

== See also ==
- William Williams (printer and publisher), native of New Hartford, and founder and printer of three newspapers in Utica, New York
