= Bagg =

Bagg or Baggs may refer to:

== Places in the United States ==
- Bagg's Hotel, Utica, New York
- Baggs, Wyoming
- Frederick A. and Sophia Bagg Bonanza Farm, North Dakota

== Surname ==
- Amanda Baggs (1980-2020), American blogger
- Arthur Eugene Baggs (1886–1947), American chemist and potter
- Bill Baggs (1921–1969), American journalist and editor
- Edmund Baggs (1865–1949), Australian art teacher and painter
- Richard Baggs (born 1974), English cricketer
- Rob Bagg (born 1985), Canadian football player
- Robert Bagg (born 1935), American poet and translator
- Stanley Clark Bagg (1820–1873), Canadian landowner
- Stevie Baggs (born 1981), American football player

== See also ==
- Bag (disambiguation)
- Baggio (disambiguation)
