= Bag, Iran =

Bag (Persian: باگ or بگ) may refer to:

- Bag, Gilan (بگ - Bag)
- Bag, Kohgiluyeh and Boyer-Ahmad (باگ - Bāg)
- Bag, Khash (بگ - Bag), Sistan and Baluchestan Province
- Bag, Qasr-e Qand (بگ - Bag), Sistan and Baluchestan Province
- Bag, Zanjan (بگ - Bag)
