= Bag (disambiguation) =

A bag is a non-rigid container.

Bag may also refer to:

== Places ==
- Bag (Bužim), a settlement in Bužim, Bosnia and Herzegovina
- Bag, Hungary, a village
- Bag, Kohgiluyeh and Boyer-Ahmad, a village in Kohgiluyeh and Boyer-Ahmad Province, Iran
- Bag, Qasr-e Qand, a village in Sistan and Baluchestan Province, Iran
- Bag, Gilan, a village in Gilan Province, Iran
- Bag, Zanjan, a village in Zanjan Province, Iran
- A third-level administrative subdivision of Mongolia

== Other uses ==
- Bag (album), an album by God Street Wine
- Bag (fishing & hunting), a quantity of fish caught or game killed
- Bag (mathematics) or multiset, a generalization of a set
- Bag (puzzle), a logic puzzle
- Bag (unit), various units of measurement
- Loakan Airport, Baguio City, Philippines, IATA code BAG
- Bathymetric Attributed Grid, a data format for bathymetric data
- Black Artists Group
- BAG Electronics, a subsidiary of Trilux
- Bundesamt für Gesundheit, German-language name for the Swiss Federal Office of Public Health
- "Bag", colloquial term for a base on a baseball field
- Vulgar slang for the human scrotum
- BAG domain, a protein domain in genetics
- "Bag", slang for cocaine

== See also ==
- Bag End, a fictional location in Lord of the Rings
- Bagman, a political operative
- Bagh (disambiguation)
- Bagg (disambiguation)
- Bagger, an unofficial title given to a courtesy clerk at a supermarket
