= William Williams (printer and publisher) =

American bookseller (1787–1850)

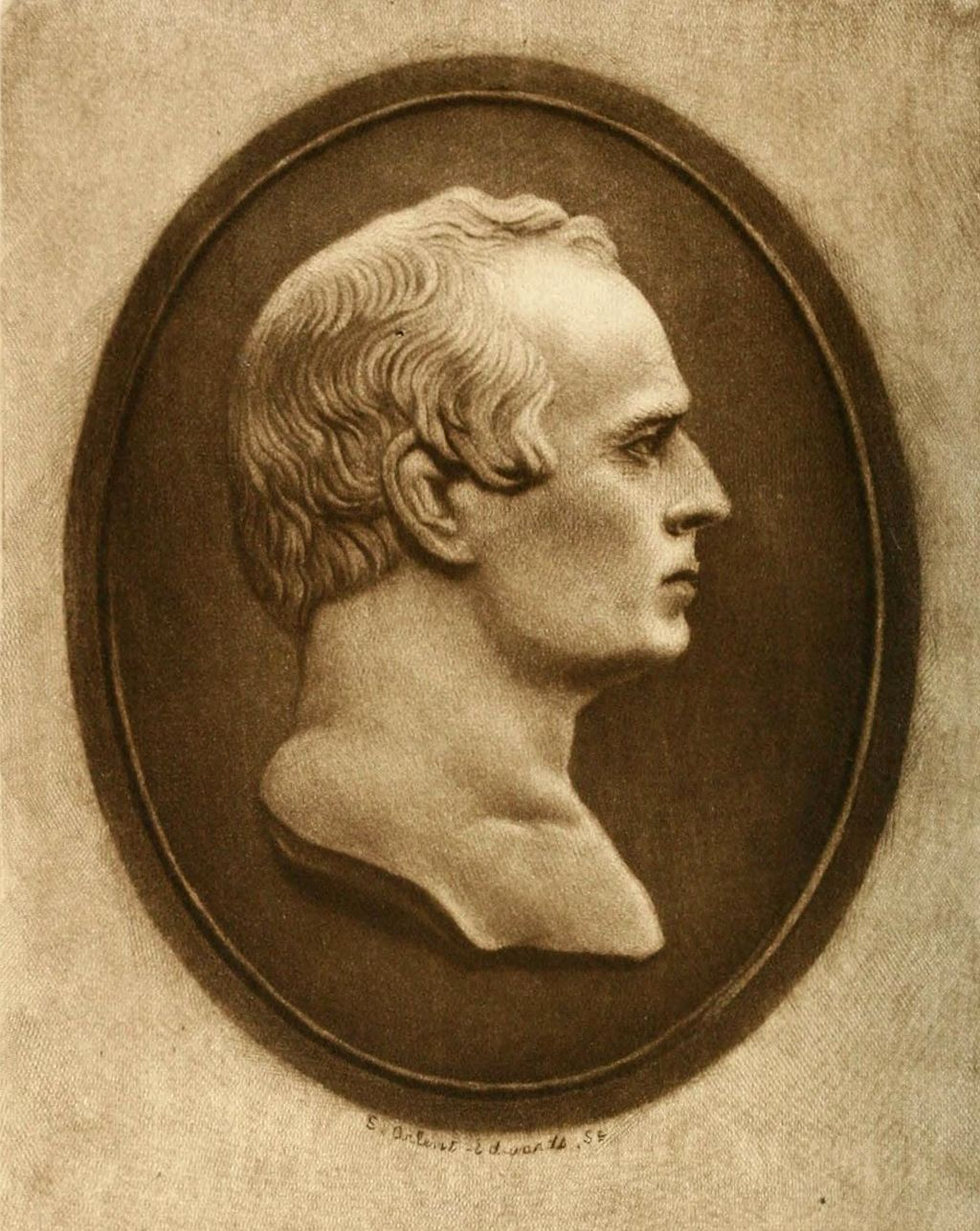
- Born: October 12, 1787; Framingham, Massachusetts, U.S.
- Died: June 10, 1850 (aged 62); Utica, New York, U.S.
- Resting place: Forest Hill Cemetery; Utica, New York, U.S.
- Occupations: Printer; publisher
- Spouses: Sophia Wells (m. 1811; died 1831) Catherine Huntington (m. 1833)
- Children: 14, including Samuel Wells

Signature
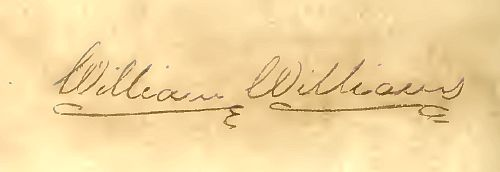

William Williams (October 12, 1787 – June 10, 1850) was an American printer, publisher and bookseller, originally from Massachusetts. He moved to New Hartford, New York, with his family and soon established himself in the printing and newspaper business in nearby Utica, New York during the early nineteenth century. Williams printed the first directory for Utica and published several Utica newspapers and almanacs. Through his various newspapers he published editorials in support of prominent politicians, canal and railroad proposals, and advocated for the colonization of free Blacks. During the War of 1812, he volunteered for military service, organized a company of militia of young men from Utica, and was present during the Second Battle of Sacket's Harbor, where he advanced to the rank of colonel. When a cholera epidemic broke out in Utica in 1832, Williams volunteered in setting up temporary hospitals and aiding the sick and himself became infected. He was an elder and a devoted member of Utica's First Presbyterian Church, and was strongly opposed to Freemasonry, to which he published a controversial newspaper, The Elucidator. Always civic minded, Williams spent the better part of his adult life involved in several areas of public service. In his latter business years he suffered financial difficulties, forcing him to sell off his bookstore and many of his effects. After receiving a serious head injury in a stagecoach accident he endured the last years of his life with a measure of mental impairment.

== Early life and family ==
Williams was born on October 12, 1787, in Framingham, Massachusetts. He was the son of Deacon Thomas Williams of Roxbury, Massachusetts, who was a member of the Minutemen during the American Revolutionary War. Growing up in a devoted religious family, Williams's strong religious proclivities were developed during his youth. He joined the First Presbyterian Church in Utica, in July 1808, which was at the time operating in conjunction with the New Hartford Church. He came with his father's family to New Hartford, New York and then to neighboring Utica in 1803, along with Asahel Seward, from whom he had learned the printing trade. (Note: Ashel had learned his printing trade serving as an apprentice to Isaiah Thomas, a prominent and accomplished colonial printer and publisher.)

Williams was a fifth generation descendant of Robert Williams, who was born in Norwich, England and emigrated to Roxbury, Massachusetts in 1637. The Williams family continued to live there until 1782 when they moved to Framingham. In 1790, they moved to New Hartford, a village established by Jedediah Sanger, a Revolutionary War veteran. (Note: During the American Revolutionary War, Sanger was a 1st Lieutenant having fought in the Battles of Lexington and Concord, the Battle of Bunker Hill, the Siege of Boston in 1776, and during the New York Campaign, serving under General Washington.)

Williams married Sophia Wells, daughter of Samuel Wells, in 1811, in New Hartford. Their marriage brought fourteen children, several of whom died very young. Sophia died November 12, 1831. Williams's son, Robert Stanton Williams, was born September 10, 1828, was the youngest surviving child of Sophia. His second son, Samuel Wells Williams, named after Williams's father-in-law, was born September 22, 1812, who became a writer doing missionary work in China. After the death of Sophia, Williams married again in 1833 to Catherine Huntington, the daughter of Hon. Henry Huntington of Rome, New York, a state legislator and the president of the Bank for Savings of the Village of Utica, the present day Bank of Utica. (Note: Hunnting became the second president of the Bank of Utica in 1813, one after the bank was founded, and was annually re-elected up until the year he died in 1846.) Williams had fourteen children by his first wife, and two by his second. He lost several children when they were in their infancy or adolescent years; Fredrick in 1814, Laura, in 1820, Julian and Harriet, in 1824, Alfred and Thomas in 1831.

== Printer and publisher ==
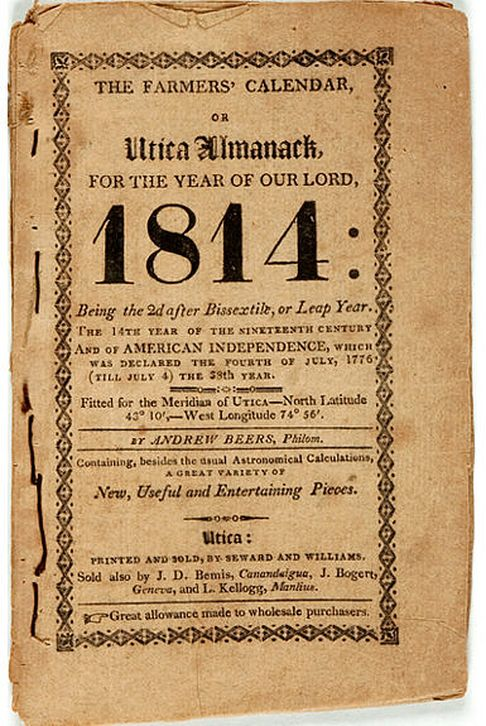
Utica Almanack, printed by Williams and Seward, 1814

Williams learned the printing trade as an apprentice in the printing shop of William McLean and Ashel Seward from 1800 to July 1807. In 1807 he joined in a partnership with Seward and formed the firm of Seward & Williams. Their firm was next to The Utica Morning Herald. William was said to be a man of great ambition and industry and went on to learn paper-making and woodcut engravings which he used in the various works he printed. Soon he was taken into and managed the Seward bookstore, at which time he printed the first directory for Utica, published in 1817. This was the first work where Williams's name appears in the title page. During his printing career Williams "trained a multitude of lads" as apprentices, often acting in a fatherly capacity, which included notable figures like Thurlow Weed who went on to become a New York newspaper publisher and politician, and Henry Ivison, an apprentice who lived with the Williams family for eight years, and who went on to become the founder of the prominent New York publishing house of Ivison, Blakeman, Taylor & Company.

Williams became a partner with Seward about 1808 and operated a bookstore at 60 Genesee Street, (Note: On the floor above the bookstore was a book bindery, and over it were the printing offices.) next to the village coffee house. Williams and Seward printed and published the speeches of Alexander B. Johnson, and John Sherman's description of Trenton Falls, in upstate New York. He also printed a speech by William H. Maynard on the bill for the proposed Chenango Canal, and Beach's Considerations for the canal, to which he appended his own tourist map of the State of New York as well as his Stage Canal and Steamboat Register.

On July 10, 1793, the first newspaper to appear west of Albany, New York, was a weekly publication called the Whitestown Gazette, which was founded in New Hartford. It was first established by Jedediah Sanger, Elijah Risley and Samuel Wells, and printed by Richard Vanderberg. It was later discontinued, but was re-established in May 1796, now with Samuel Wells as the proprietor, and William McLean doing the printing. (Note: In the same year of 1793 the erection of the first church in Oneida county was also begun at New Hartford.) After four years McLean moved the newspaper to Utica, changing its name to the Whitestown Gazette and Cato's Patrol. (Note: Cato's Patrol is a reference to the younger Cato, who was the defender of ancient Utica.) It became the first newspaper to appear in Utica. Mr. McLean, a native of Hartford, Connecticut, sold the Gazette to two of his apprentices, Williams and Seward, and returned to New Hartford. Williams and Seward, changed the name of Whitestown Gazette to The Utica Patriot, which later became The Patriot and Patrol up until 1824. Fours later it was renamed The Utica Sentinel with Williams being the sole owner.

On August 11, 1814, Williams and Seward established a weekly newspaper, called The Utica Club, which was commonly called The Club. Edited by Henry Goodfellow, Esq. & Company, it ran from 1814 to 1815. Through their newspaper they advertised for "The Philadelphia Edition of the Edinburgh Encyclopedia" ..."just received by A. Seward at his book-store, and subscriptions are to be paid and called for by subscribers." By 1818 Williams and Seward still continued to employ their newspaper in the advertising of the various works they had published. Their business continued until 1824, when their partnership dissolved with the withdrawal of Seward, but the business in all its aspects continued for several years longer under Williams. Williams also published his Williams's Calendar, and Andrew Beer's Utica Almanac.

From early on religious publications comprised a large portion of the newspapers and journals circulating in central New York. These included, The Christian Monitor and Sunday Morning Repast, issued in Waterville. Among such works was Williams's Utica Christian Repository, a religious journal which he began printing in 1822 at his shop at 60 Genesee Street, in Utica. It featured "Doctrinal and practical subjects on religion" along with "Religious intelligence." It received contributions from various ministers of the Presbyterian Church, including Eev. William R Weeks, who later became the editor. The Christian Repository ran for a period of seven years. (Note: The Utica Christian Repository had its name changed to The Western Recorder and continued as a religious weekly newspaper, under G. Tracy.) In 1822 Williams also printed the Constitution of the Presbyterian Church in the United States.

After Williams's partner Seward withdrew, he was not again actively engaged in business, instead preferring to live a quiet life. Though Williams was strongly opposed to the precepts of the Freemasonry, Seward was, however, considered the very back bone of the Masonic Lodge, and presented its members with a Bible they used for many years following. Williams published a weekly newspaper called The Elucidator, founded by its editor B. B. Hotchkin in 1829, which largely featured anti-Masonic essays, but it proved to be a financial failure, and only remained in publication until February 18, 1834. In 1829, he also published a work entitled Light on Masonry, which further subjected him to the ill-will of the Masonic community. Williams was subsequently publicly accused by his opponents in The Oneida Observer, February 23, 1830 issue, (Note: The Oneida Observer, after several name changes, became the Observer-Dispatch in 1930.) of "reaping a rich reward from the printing and selling of Anti-masonic books."

Williams also printed, in 1832, an edition of the New Testament; Walter King's Questions on the Gospel Harmony; Proceedings of thee Synod of Dort. Williams wanted to do more with his career than just being a bookseller, printer, and newspaper proprietor, and subsequently learned the art of engraving. In this capacity, he performed work for the firm of Balch and Stiles, who printed maps of New York and banknotes for the city and Bank of Utica and some western banks. Williams also established a newspaper called The Farmers' Calendar that featured advice for farming in New York for each year of the month. He had announced that the word NEWS was derived from the four cardinal points of the compass marked with the letters N, E, W, and S.

Selected examples of wood-cut images
Crafted by William Williams, used in his printed works

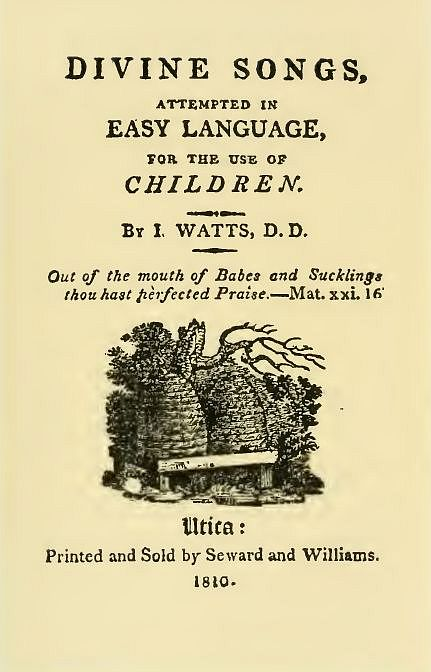
Divine Songs for Children, printed by Williams & Seward, 1810 (Note: Examples taken from reproductions published in Williams's biography, by his grandson, John C. Williams, 1906)

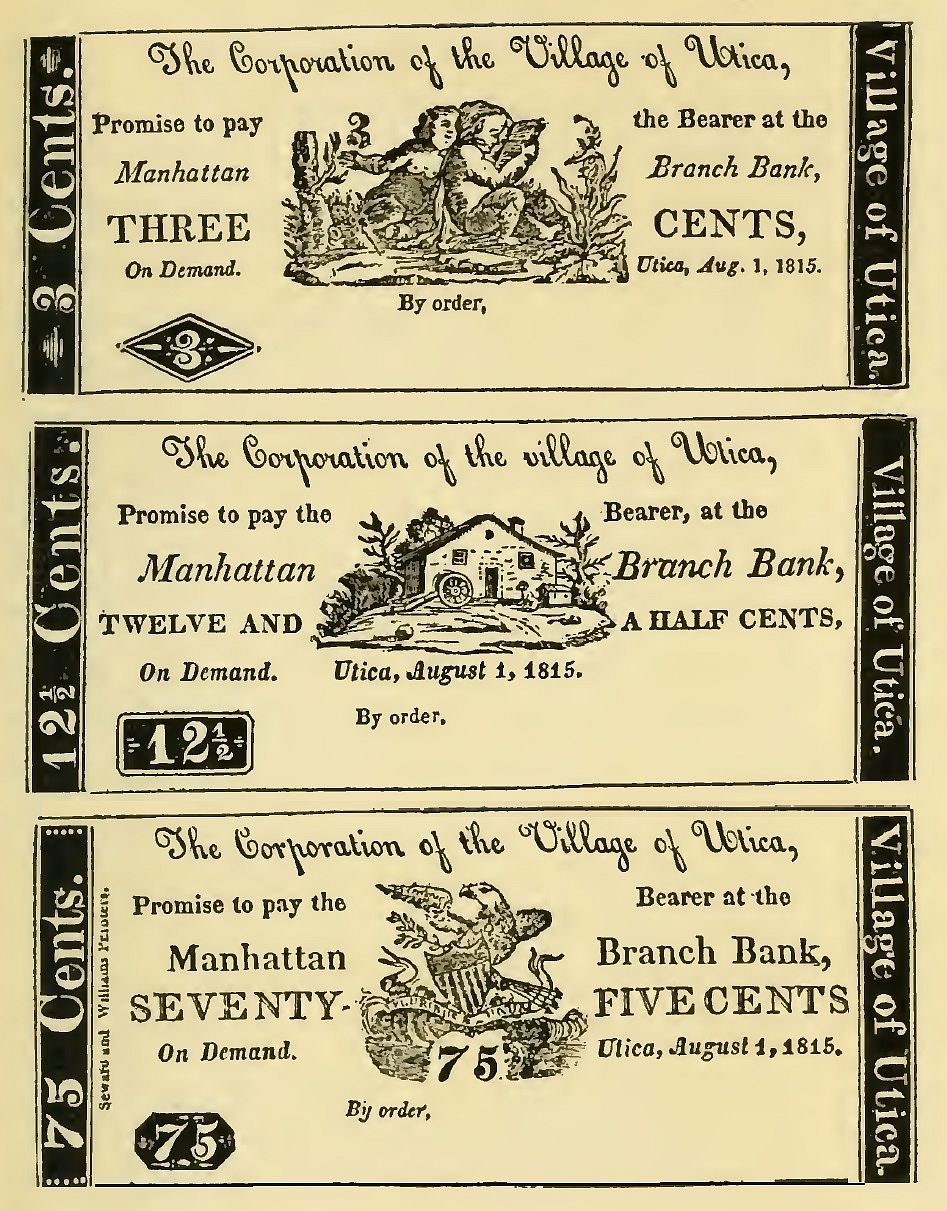
Utica banknotes, printed by William Williams, 1815

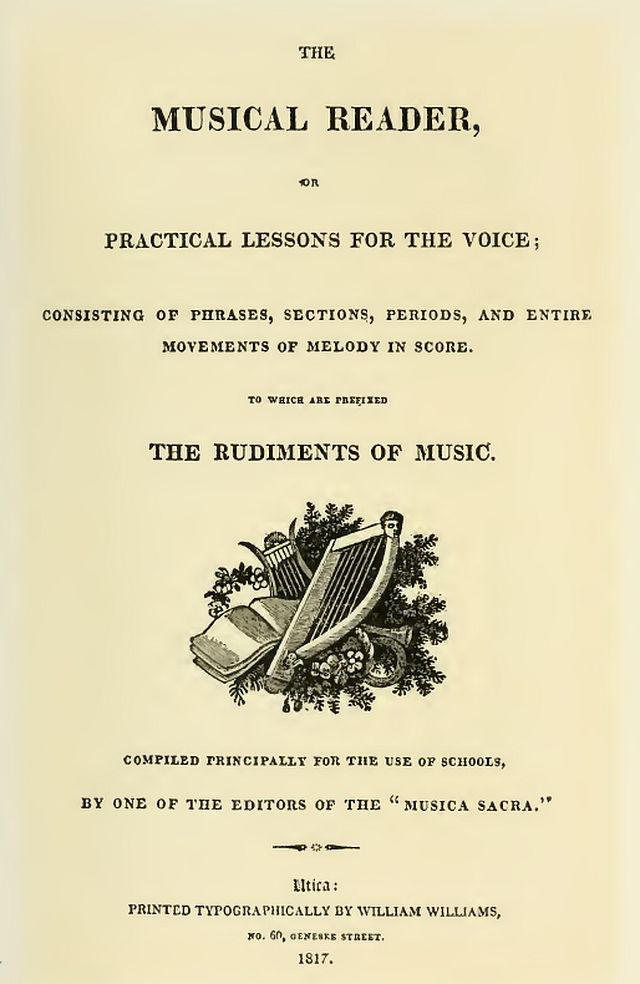
The Rudiments of Music, printed by William Williams, 1817

== War of 1812 ==
In 1813, during the War of 1812, a second attack was expected at Sacketts Harbor. When volunteers were summoned, Williams was the first and most active man in Utica to muster and organize a company, of which he was appointed captain. At the time, the young Thurlow Weed was working for Williams in his office, where Williams consented to his leaving Utica to join the company. Williams' company was attached to the 134th Regiment, under the command of Sir William Pepperill. Other men from this regiment included Nathan Seward, of New Hartford, and Thurlow Weed from Utica. Prior to the war, Weed worked in the office of Williams, was a resident at his home for a short time, and would later speak of Williams fondly in his autobiography. A companion of Williams and a member of the company gave witness:

"So prompt were his movements, that in thirty hours after the requisition was received, we were on our way in sleighs for the Harbor. And here, as in a subsequent campaign when he was on the lines in the staff of General Collins, Colonel Williams was as highly valued as a soldier, as he was through life esteemed as a citizen."

During the campaign, Williams was promoted to brigade major and subsequently advanced to the rank of colonel on the staff of General Oliver Collins. Williams's company advanced to the front lines in a sleigh and was stationed there most of the time until July 1814. Williams served elsewhere during the war, and remained in service after it ended as colonel of the militia regiment in Utica.

== Public service ==
Williams became involved in public service in a religious, educational, civic and political capacity. He was elected an elder of the First Presbyterian Church in Utica from 1812 to 1836, after which he left the city to live in Erie County. Out of concern for the educational needs of the growing town, Williams served as president of the Western Education Society and became the director of the Utica Public Library. (Note: The original library was housed on Broad Street, and after three more relocations it remains at its present location on Genesee Street.) He also functioned as the village trustee. Upon the establishment of the Utica Sunday School in 1816, Williams became its first superintendent, and during the years following he was a Sunday school instructor. He also became the president of the Western Sunday School Union.

Beginning in 1816, Williams published editorials in his Utica Patriot and Patrol in support of the proposed Erie Canal and railroads in central New York. From 1821 to 1824 Williams published editorials supporting DeWitt Clinton during his second term as New York Governor. He also published editorials against "negro slavery", and in support of the colonization of free Blacks in Haiti. Meetings were held in the First Presbyterian Church in Utica, of which Williams was an elder, favoring the American Colonization Society. These meetings were the cause of much excitement, leading to the formation of a convention of the Anti-Slavery Society, which was held on October 21, 1835, in Utica.

In 1828, the Utica fire department was reorganized and Williams was appointed the chief engineer. (Note: Utica native and historian Moses Bagg doubts that office existed before Williams assumed the position.) He resigned as engineer on May 25, 1830, with John H. Ostrom taking his place. On June 8, 1831, Williams was a member of LaFayette Engine, Number 4, and on August 31, 183I, engines companies number 4 and 5 united, all being under the command of Williams.

== Later years ==
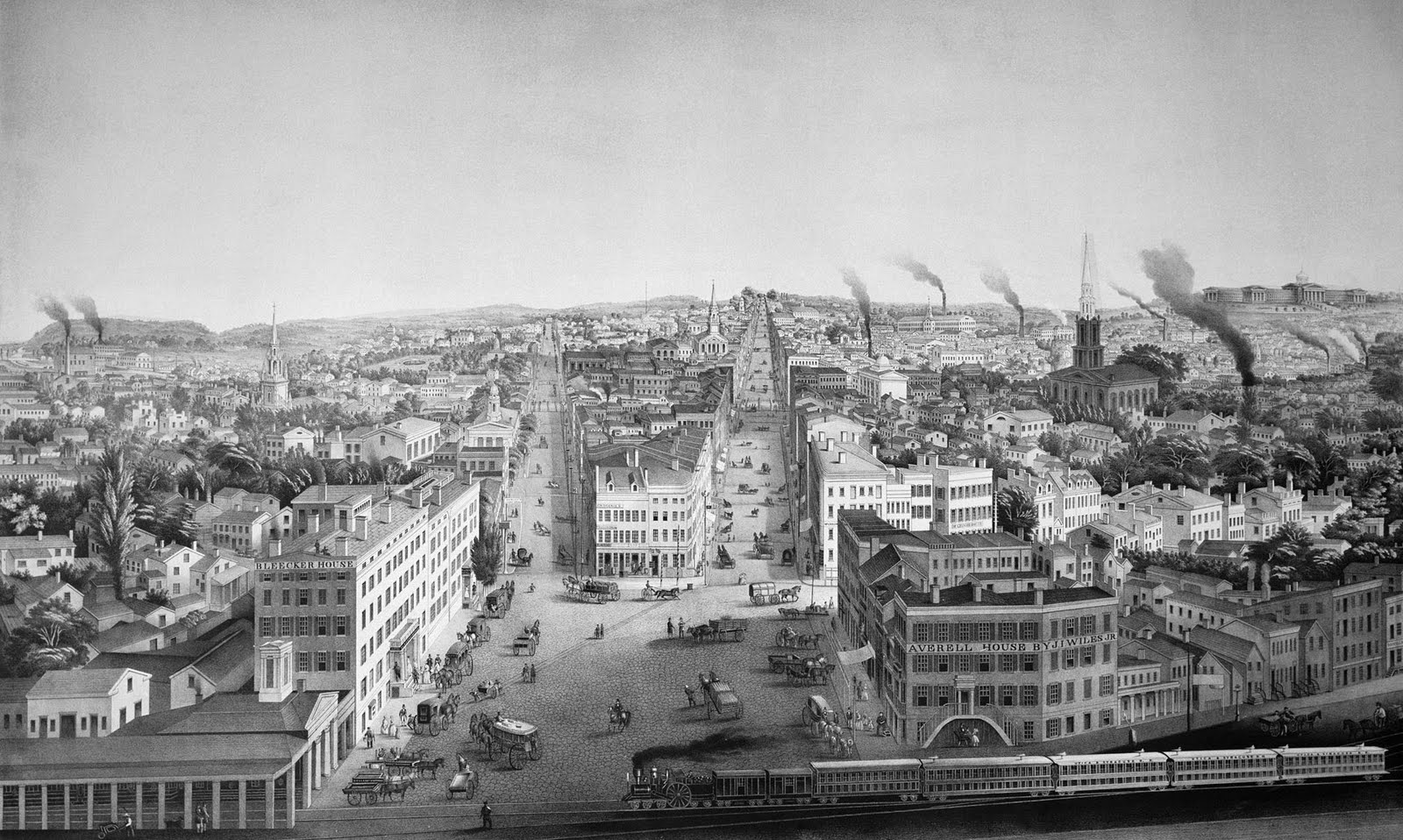
Bagg's Square in Utica New York; Location of Williams & Seward bookstore and printing shop

Before Utica was incorporated as a city in 1832, it was a small village, about the same size as New Hartford, known as Fort Schuyler. (Note: The act to incorporate the city of Utica was passed by the New York legislature on February 13, 1832. Joseph Kirkland (congressman) became Utica's first mayor.) That year a cholera epidemic reached the north eastern United States and Canada and broke out in Utica. Williams was earnest in his efforts in setting up temporary hospitals and in attending to the sick, with little regard for his own comfort and safety. Along with one of his daughters, he became infected, and narrowly survived the ordeal. The Board of Health had formed a committee to deal with ways to curb the spread of the cholera epidemic, of which Williams was a member.

In 1834 Williams fell into financial debt with his creditors, while also owing back taxes, and had many of his effects sold at Sheriff's auctions, while creditors ran his store, still under his name, seeking compensation. By 1836 he sold his bookstore and moved his family to Tonawanda in Erie County to manage an estate of which he was part owner with his father-in-law, Henry Huntington, of Rome.

In 1841, while riding topside on a stagecoach, Williams was involved in a severe accident, having been thrown from the top, resulting in a head injury. It left him somewhat mentally impaired from which he never fully recovered, which lead into further financial troubles. His father-in-law Henry Huntington, died the next year, and left Williams and his wife a share of his estate. Williams returned to Utica and died in his home at 48 Broad Street, on June 10, 1850, at the age of sixty-two. He was buried there in Forest Hill Cemetery. By that time the population of the village of Utica had increased to over 17,000, while the Utica and Schenectady Railroad Company had long since been established and the Chenango Canal completed. Williams's close friend Thurlow Weed once wrote that, after the death of William Williams, that "as a citizen, he was public spirited beyond his means; his counsel, his exertions, and his purse were ever at the service of any enterprise calculated to benefit the place." Williams's newspapers and maps is said to have aided in the public awareness, support and promotion of many projects that came to fruition in upstate New York. Not long after Williams's death, his son, Robert, erected a brass plate next to the pulpit in the Presbyterian church with a eulogy of Williams's memory inscribed on it. Williams's grandson, John Camp Williams, wrote a biography of William in 1906, entitled, An Oneida County printer, William Williams, printer, publisher.

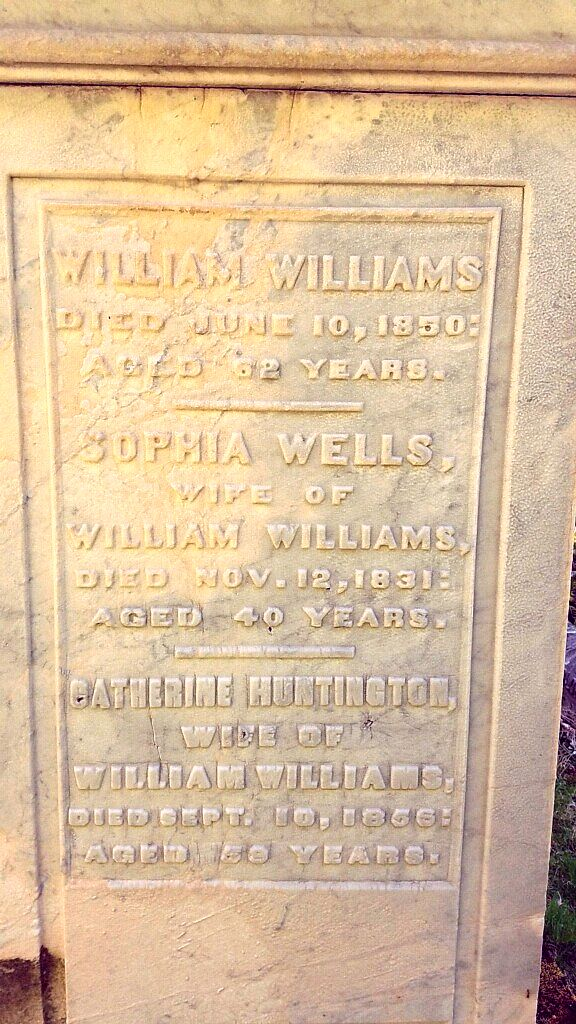
Williams Williams tombstone, Forest Hill Cemetery, Utica, New York

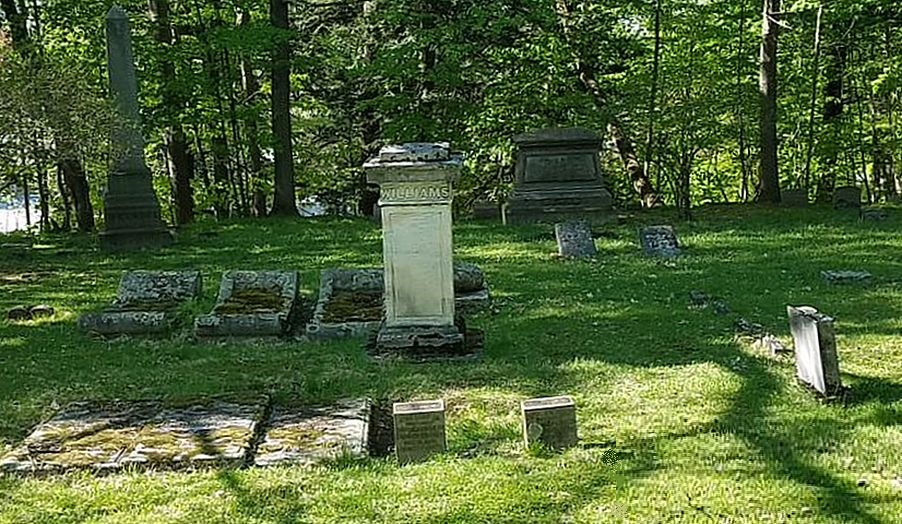
Williams family cemetery plot, Forest Hill Cemetery, Utica, NY

== See also ==
- Jedediah Sanger, founder of the town of New Hartford, New York
- Bagg's Hotel
- Early American publishers and printers
- History of newspaper publishing

== Bibliography ==
- Bagg, Moses Mears (1877). The pioneers of Utica. Utica, N.Y. : Curtiss & Childs. "Full title: The pioneers of Utica : being sketches of its inhabitants and its institutions, with the civil history of the place, from the earliest settlement to the year 1825, the era of the opening of the Erie Canal"
- Bagg, Moses Mears (1892). Memorial history of Utica, N.Y. : from its settlement to the present time. Syracuse, N.Y. : D. Mason.
- Book Trade Labels at the American Antiquarian Society (PDF). American Antiquarian Society.
- Brigham, Clarence Saunders (1941). History and Bibliography of American Newspapers, 1690-1820 (PDF). Vol. 1. American Antiquarian Society. Google link
- Child, Hamilton (1869). Gazetteer and business directory of Oneida County. Syracuse, Printed at the Journal office. "reprinting of old catalog"
- Cookingham, Henry J. (1912). History of Oneida County, New York : from 1700 to the present time. Vol. I. Chicago : S.J. Clarke Pub. Co.
- Durant, Samuel W. (1878). History of Oneida County, New York. Philadelphia: Evertts & Fariss.
- Galpin, William Freeman (1941). Central New York, an inland empire, comprising Oneida, Madison, Onondaga, Cayuga, Tompkins, Cortland, Chenango counties and their people. Vol. II. New York, Lewis Historical Pub. Co.
- Hamilton, Milton Wheaton (1936). The country printer, New York State, 1785-1830. New York, NY: Columbia University Press.
- Johnson, Allen; Malone, Dumas, eds. (1943). Dictionary of American biography. Vol. XX. New York, Charles Scribner's Sons.
- Malone, Dumas (1664) [1936]. Malone, Dumas (ed.). Dictionary of American Biography. Vol. X. Charles Scribner's Sons.
- Documents of the Assembly of the State of New York, Issues 161-263. E. Croswell: New York (State). Legislature. Assembly. 1835.
- Stern, Madeleine B. (July 1950). "Books in the Wilderness: Some 19th Century Upstate Publishers". New York History. 3 (3). Cornell University Press: 260–282. JSTOR 23149980.
- Stern, Madeleine B. (1951). William Williams : pioneer printer of Utica, New York, 1787-1850. Charlottesville, VA : Bibliographical Society of the University of Virginia.
- Wager, Daniel Elbridge (1896). Our county and its people : a descriptive work on Oneida County, New York. Boston, Mass.: Boston History Co.
- Weed, Thurlow (1883). Life of Thurlow Weed including his autobiography and a memoir. Boston and New York: Houghton Mifflin and Co.
- Williams, John Camp (1906). An Oneida County printer, William Williams, printer, publisher, editor. New York : Charles Scribner's Sons.
- Williams, William (1825). The Utica Christian Repository. Vol. IV. William Williams.
- Wilson, John Grant; Fiske, John, eds. (1899). Appletons' Cyclopaedia of American Biography. Vol. VI. New York, D. Appleton.
- "Utica Public Library". Utica Public Library.
