= Baggio =

Baggio may refer to:

== Given name or nickname ==
- Adis Baggio Hušidić (born 1987), Bosnian-American footballer
- Sixtus Baggio Leung (born 1986), Hong Kong activist and politician
- Baggio Rakotoarisoa (born 1996), Malagasy footballer
- Baggio Rakotonomenjanahary (born 1991), Malagasy footballer
- Baggio Siadi (born 1997), Congolese footballer
- Baggio Wallenburg (born 1999), Dutch footballer

== Surname ==
- Amy M. Baggio (born 1973), American district judge and lawyer
- Dino Baggio (born 1971), Italian footballer
- Douglas Baggio (born 1995), Brazilian footballer
- Eddy Baggio (born 1974), Italian football manager and former player
- Fabio Baggio (born 1965), Italian Roman Catholic cardinal
- Filippo Baggio (born 1988), Italian racing cyclist
- Roberto Baggio (born 1967), Italian footballer
- Sebastiano Baggio (1913–1993), Italian Roman Catholic cardinal

== Other uses ==
- Baggio (district of Milan)
  - Baggio Cemetery
- Baggio: The Divine Ponytail, a 2021 biographical film about Roberto Baggio
- Lycée César Baggio, a high school in Lille, France

== See also ==
- Anselm of Baggio (1010/1015–1073), birth name of Pope Alexander II
- Anselm of Baggio or Anselm of Lucca (1036–1086), Italian Catholic bishop and saint, nephew of the above
- Baggio–Yoshinari syndrome, an infectious disease
