= William Cary Sanger =

American politician

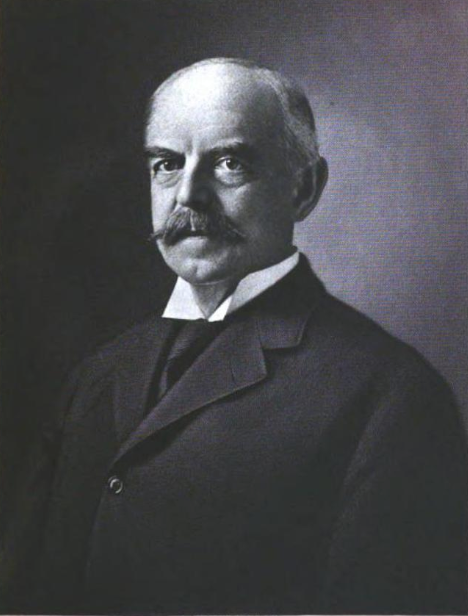

United States Assistant Secretary of War
- In office 1901–1903

Member of the New York State Assembly
- In office 1895–1897

Personal details
- Born: May 21, 1853 Brooklyn, New York
- Died: December 6, 1921 (aged 68) Brooklyn, New York
- Resting place: Green-Wood Cemetery
- Spouse: Mary Ethel Cleveland Dodge
- Education: Harvard College; Columbia University; Hamilton College
- Occupation: Lawyer, politician

William Cary Sanger Sr. (May 21, 1853 – December 6, 1921) was an American politician who served as the United States Assistant Secretary of War from 1901 to 1903.

== Biography ==
He was born on May 21, 1853, in Brooklyn, New York City, to Henry Sanger (1823–1888) and Mary E. Requa (1835–1910). He attended Brooklyn Polytechnic and then Harvard College, where he graduated with an A.B. in 1874. He received an LL.B. from Columbia University in 1878. He was a member of the New York State Assembly from 1895 to 1897. He married Mary Ethel Cleveland Dodge (1869–1952).

He was the United States Assistant Secretary of War from 1901 to 1903.

He received an LL.D. from Hamilton College in 1902. He was president of the American delegation to the Geneva Conventions of 1906.

From 1911 to 1913 he served on the New York State Hospital Commission.

He was a member of the Order of the Founders and Patriots of America, and served as its eleventh and thirteenth Governor General, first from 1914 to 1916, and again after the death of his first successor from 1916 to 1917.

He died on December 6, 1921, in Brooklyn. He was buried in Green-Wood Cemetery. His widow died in 1952.

== See also ==
- Jedediah Sanger
- Joseph P. Sanger
- George P. Sanger
- Charles Robert Sanger

New York State Assembly
| Preceded by Silas T. Ives | New York State Assembly; Oneida County; 1895–1897 | Succeeded by Joseph Porter |
