= Forest Hill Cemetery (Utica, New York) =

Cemetery in Utica, New York, USA

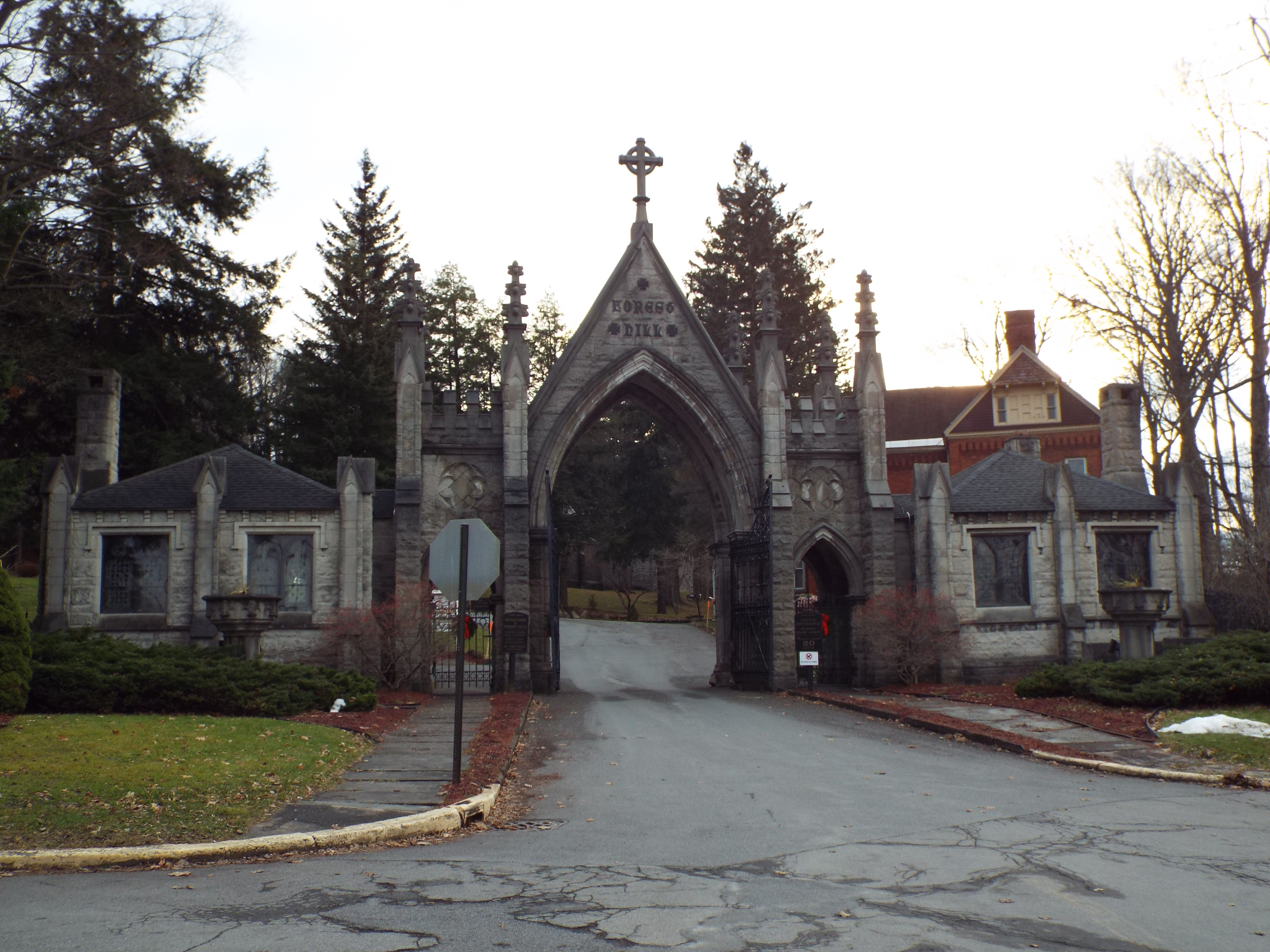
- The gatehouse entrance to Forest Hill Cemetery in December 2014
- Interactive map of Forest Hill Cemetery

Details
- Established: 1850
- Location: 2201 Oneida St., Utica, New York, U.S.
- Coordinates: 43°04′41″N 75°15′14″W
- Style: Gothic Revival
- Website: www.foresthillcemetery.org

Forest Hill Cemetery is a rural cemetery in Utica, New York founded in 1850. The cemetery was listed on the National Register of Historic Places in 2017. Forest Hills Cemetery is located at 2201 Oneida Street, in Utica, New York. It is a non-sectarian cemetery, which means anyone of any religion can be buried there. Over the years some nationally and locally recognized people have been buried here. Because of its many monuments, grave sites of famous people, along with other historical structures, the cemetery is sometimes referred to as "Utica's outdoor museum".

== Founding ==
Forest Hill Cemetery was founded in 1848 by a group of local residents to satisfy the growing needs of Utica, which was increasing in size, as the city's existing cemetery on Water Street had become over-crowded. A meeting of citizens was held at the office of Thomas R. Walker with Judge William J. Bacon presiding. Here they determined to form an association for the purpose of establishing a cemetery which should be called the Utica Cemetery Association. The cemetery officially opened in June 1850 and was attended by a formal ceremony with a parade and a sizeable group of local residents and others from the surrounding area. Also attending the ceremony were about 200 Oneida and Onondaga Indians who came to pay tribute to their sacred stone and commend its new resting place. After prayers had been offered and hymnssung, an address was delivered by William Tracy. This was followed by brief speeches from the Chief Sachems of the Oneida and Onondagas.

In 1857, A.G. Howard, known as a “florist of acknowledged taste and skill”, was appointed as the cemetery's superintendent. At his recommendation a receiving tomb and a chapel were erected and completed in 1863.

In 2017 Assemblyman Anthony Brindisi announced that Forest Hill Cemetery has been added to the National Register of Historic Places.

== Notable burials ==
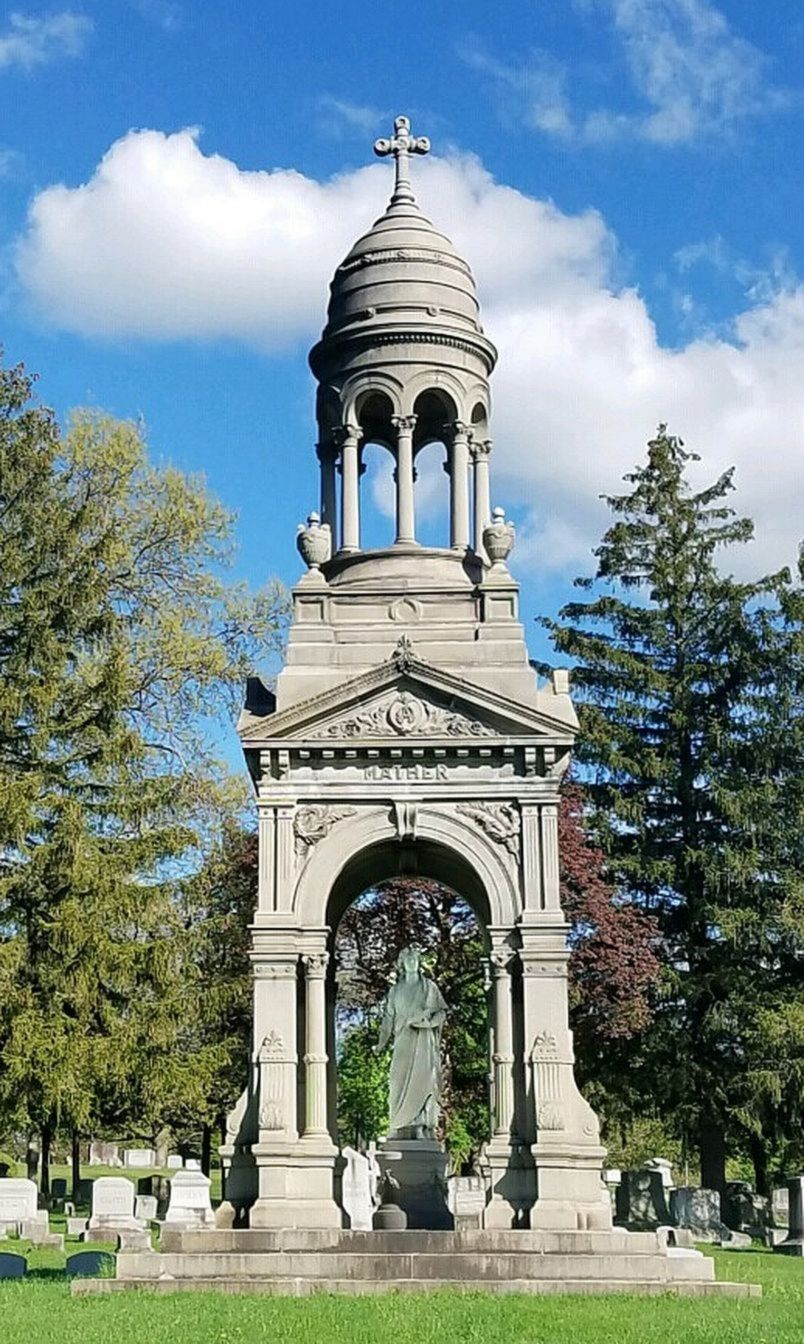
Asaoph Mather, founder of AD Mather Bank of Utica

On June 17, 1875, the remains of two distinguished officers of the American Revolutionary War were moved from the old cemetery on Water Street to Forest Hill. These were the remains of Colonel Benjamin Walker, Aide-de-camp to Baron von Steuben and, later, to General George Washington; and of Dr. John Cochran, Surgeon-general of the Continental Army. Some of the local people buried here include Theodore Faxton, the Proctor Family, and nationally are some politicians such as Ellis Roberts, Ward Hunt and many more.

On May 7, 1974, the trusties of the cemetery voted that the Oneida Indian sacred stone be returned to the Oneida Nation of Indians if such a request was verified as coming from actual members of that Nation. The stone was subsequently relocated to the Oneida Indian Reservation in Verona, New York.

Other noteworthy burials include:

- Ezekiel Bacon (1776–1870), represented Massachusetts's 12th congressional district from 1807 to 1813.
- William J. Bacon (1803–1889), represented New York's 23rd congressional district from 1877 to 1879.
- William Baker (1795–1871), American lawyer and politician.
- Irving Baxter (1876–1957), American Olympian at the 1900 Summer Olympics
- Samuel Beardsley (1790–1860), represented New York in the United States House of Representatives from 1831 to 1836, from 1843 to 1844.
- Samuel Livingston Breese (1794–1870), U.S. Navy rear admiral
- Alonzo Breitenstein (1857–1932), 19th century American baseball player
- John Warren Butterfield (1801–1869), founder Butterfield Overland Express.
- Charles F. Cleveland (1845–1908), American Medal of Honor recipient during the Civil War
- Alfred Conkling (1789–1874), represented New York's 14th congressional district from 1821 to 1823.
- Roscoe Conkling (1829–1888), represented New York in the United States Senate from 1867 to 1883.
- Alfred Conkling Coxe Jr. (1880–1957), Judge of the United States District Court for the Southern District of New York from 1929 to 1957.
- Hiram Denio (1799–1871), Chief Judge of the New York Court of Appeals from 1856 to 1857 and 1862 to 1865.
- Harold Frederic (1856–1898), writer.
- James G. Grindlay (1840–1907), Civil War Medal of Honor Recipient.
- Thomas Hill Hubbard (1781–1857), represented New York's 17th congressional district from 1817 to 1819, and from 1821 to 1823.
- Ward Hunt (1810–1886), Associate Justice of the Supreme Court of the United States from 1873 to 1882.
- Alexander S. Johnson (1817–1878), Chief Judge of the New York Court of Appeals and federal circuit judge
- Joseph Kirkland (congressman) (1770–1844), represented New York's 16th congressional district from 1821 to 1823. Mayor of Utica in 1832.
- Juice Latham (1852–1914), American baseball player and manager
- James H. Ledlie (1832–1882), general in the Union Army during the American Civil War.
- Fred Lewis, 19th century American baseball player
- Orsamus B. Matteson, (1805–1889), represented New York's 20th congressional district from 1849 to 1851, and from 1853 to 1859.
- Rutger B. Miller (1805–1877), represented New York's 17th congressional district from 1836 to 1837.
- Art Mills (1903–1975), American baseball player and coach
- Justus H. Rathbone (1839–1889), Founder of the Knights of Pythias
- Hardy Richardson (1855–1931), 19th century American baseball player
- Ellis H. Roberts (1827–1918), served in the United States House of Representatives from 1871 to 1875.
- Jedediah Sanger (1751–1829), founder of New Hartford and Sangerfield, first judge of Oneida County.
- John Savage (1779–1863), Chief Justice of the New York Supreme Court from 1823 to 1836.
- Theodore S. Sayre (1837–1916), mayor of Utica in 1874, New York state senator from 1876 to 1877.
- Biff Schlitzer (1884–1948), 20th century American baseball player
- Horatio Seymour (1810–1886), Governor of New York from 1853 to 1855 and from 1863 to 1865.
- James R. Sheffield (1864–1938), Ambassador to Mexico and New York politician.
- Carrie Babcock Sherman (1856–1931), Second Lady of the United States from 1909 to 1912.
- James S. Sherman (1855–1912), Vice President of the United States from 1909 to 1912, who died in office.
- Joshua A. Spencer (1790–1857), New York state senator and mayor of Utica.
- Charles A. Talcott (1857–1920), represented New York's 27th congressional district and New York's 33rd congressional district from 1911 to 1915. Mayor of Utica from 1902 to 1906.
- Edward W. Townsend (1855–1942), represented New Jersey's 6th congressional district from 1911 to 1913, and the 10th district from 1913 to 1915.
- David Wager (1804–1870), New York state politician
- Benjamin Walker (1753–1818), represented New York's 9th congressional district from 1801 to 1803.
- Nathan Williams (1773–1835), U.S. Representative from New York, judge, librarian
- William Williams, founder of three Utica newspapers, printed Utica's first directory in 1817, Colonel in the War of 1812

== Legacy ==
In 2017 New York Assemblyman Anthony Brindisi proclaimed that "Forest Hill Cemetery is a treasure trove of history, and many of the leading military, business and political figures of the 19th and early 20th centuries are buried here."

== See also ==
- List of burial places of presidents and vice presidents of the United States
- List of burial places of justices of the Supreme Court of the United States

== Sources ==
- "Forest Hill: History". Utica Cemetery Association, Utica New York.
- Millo, Tennille-Lynn (August 4, 2020). "Forest Hill Cemetery – an inquisitive stroll through the past, present and future". Utica Observer Dispatch.
- Carey, Dan (May 24, 1974). "Relic Returning to Indian Land". The Post-Standard. Syracuse, New York.
- "Forest Hill Cemetery added to historic register". Utica Observer Dispatch. October 3, 2017.
