= Charles F. Cleveland =

American Medal of Honor recipient (1845–1908)

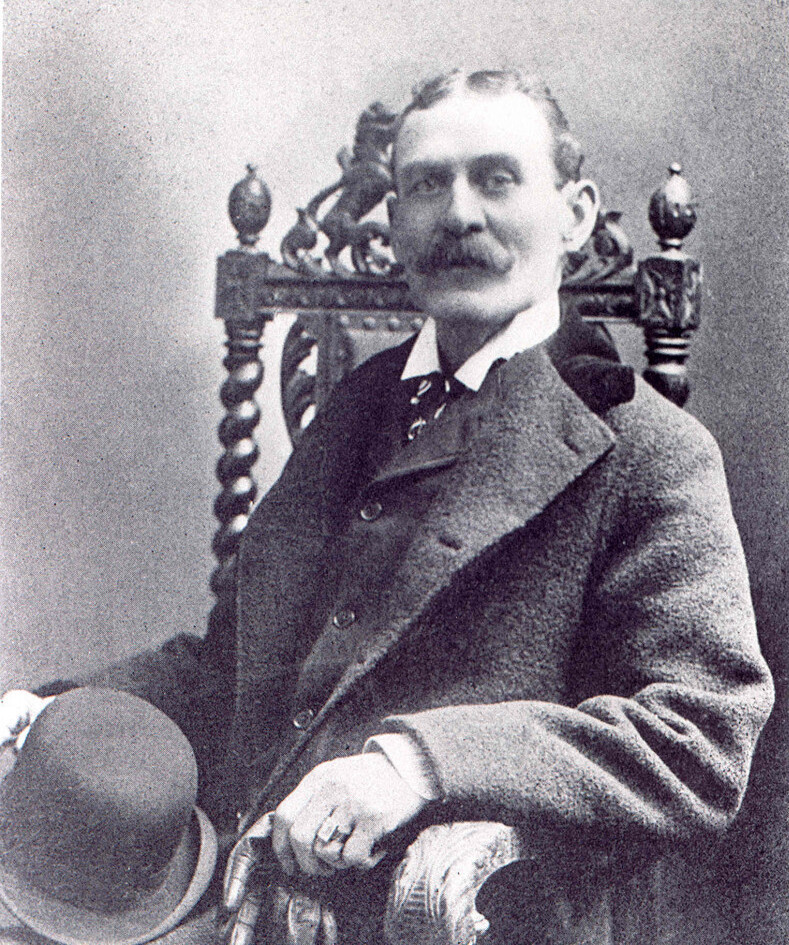
- Born: August 14, 1845; Hartford, New York, U.S.
- Died: February 29, 1908 (aged 63); Utica, New York, U.S.
- Burial place: Forest Hill Cemetery; Utica, New York, U.S.
- Spouse: Catherine Teresa (m. 1865)
- Children: 4
- Military career
- Allegiance: United States of America
- Branch: United States Army
- Service years: 1861–1863
- Rank: Private
- Unit: (New York (state)) 26th Regiment, New York Volunteer Infantry - Company C
- Conflicts: Battle of Antietam
- Awards: Medal of Honor

Charles F. Cleveland (August 14, 1845 – February 29, 1908) was an American soldier who fought in the American Civil War. Cleveland received the country's highest award for bravery during combat, the Medal of Honor, for his action during the Battle of Antietam in Maryland on 17 September 1862. He was honored with the award on 12 June 1895.

== Biography ==
Cleveland was born in Hartford, New York on August 14, 1845, to Daniel Cleveland and Alameda Dickinson Cleveland. Before the outbreak of the war he was a carpenter in Utica, New York. He enlisted into the 26th New York Infantry.

On September 17, 1862, the day on which he performed the act of gallantry that earned him the Medal of Honor, his regiment was involved in the Battle of Antietam. On seeing the color bearer of the regiment shot down, Cleveland voluntarily proceeded to take up the colors and carried them throughout the remainder of the battle. He was wounded during this battle but returned to his unit within two months.

Following the war Cleveland returned to Utica and entered the police service in 1874, moving up the ranks in the force in Utica, New York until he was eventually promoted to Chief of Police in June 1898. He served in this capacity until his death on February 29, 1908. His remains are interred at the Forest Hill Cemetery in Utica, New York.

Cleveland married Catherine Teresa in 1865, with whom he had four children.

== Medal of Honor citation ==
Voluntarily took and carried the colors into action after the color bearer had been shot.

== See also ==
- List of American Civil War Medal of Honor recipients: A–F
