= Benjamin Walker (Continental Army officer) =

Continental Army officer, businessman, and politician

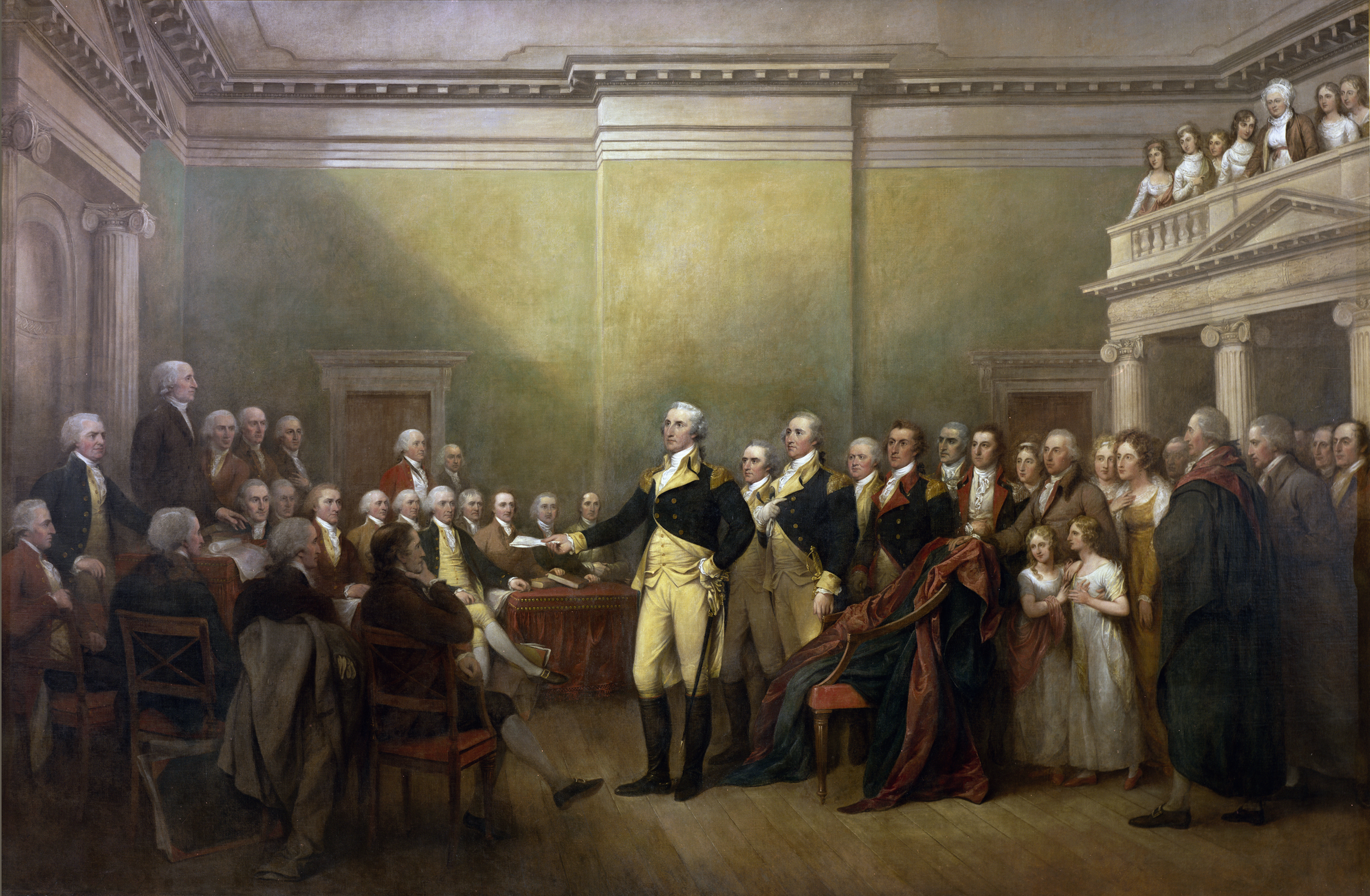
- General George Washington Resigning His Commission by John Trumbull. Walker stands directly behind Washington.

Member of the U.S. House of Representatives from New York's 9th district
- In office March 4, 1801 – March 3, 1803
- Preceded by: Jonas Platt
- Succeeded by: Killian K. Van Rensselaer

Personal details
- Born: 1753 London, England
- Died: January 13, 1818 (aged 64–65) Utica, New York, U.S.
- Resting place: Forest Hill Cemetery; Utica, New York, U.S.
- Party: Federalist Party
- Occupation: Soldier; politician

Benjamin Walker (1753 – January 13, 1818) was a Continental Army officer, businessman, and politician who served in the American Revolutionary War and later served as a United States representative from New York.

== Early life ==
Benjamin Walker was born in England in 1753.

Through a Blue Coat School he received "not a brilliant, but a solid education."

After his schooling, Walker spent some time in France where he gained fluency in French. Peter Stephen Du Ponceau, a native French speaker and linguist, would eventually describe Walker as a "master of the French language."

At a young age, he entered into a respectable merchant house in London that brought him to the United States. He settled in New York City and resided with an eminent merchant until joining the Revolutionary War.

== Career ==
=== Military career ===
Walker was first appointed as Captain of the Second New York Regiment in the Revolutionary War.

On the 25th of April, 1778, he was appointed as an aide-de-camp to General Friedrich Wilhelm von Steuben.

Walker's fluency in French is what brought him to the attention of Baron von Steuben. Steuben's limited English at times frustrated his attempts to drill the soldiers at Valley Forge in complicated maneuvers. On one such occasion, Walker stepped forward and offered his assistance in perfect French. Gratified, Steuben would later reflect, "If I had seen an angel from Heaven I should not have more rejoiced." Within weeks, Walker was placed in his new position.

Superintending his correspondence, Walker was a special help with translating Steuben's words. Steuben would dictate in French and Walker would transcribe in English. Virtually all of the drafts for Steuben's reforms and plans for the Continental Army are in Walker's handwriting. Walker further acted as translator when necessary during inspections and reviews the Baron conducted.

Alongside others, Walker assisted Steuben with his Blue Book, particularly providing knowledge of American military terminology.

At the close of the war Walker was appointed as an aide-de-camp to General George Washington. On December 23, 1783, he accompanied Washington to the resignation of his commission as commander-in-chief. In a letter suggesting men for military appointment, the General included Walker "among the most intelligent and active Officers of the late American Army".

=== Civic and political career ===
By September 1789, Walker was the New York customs naval officer. From March 21, 1791, until February 20, 1798, Walker served as a captain and the naval officer of customs at the port of New York.

Walker later worked as the First Secretary to the Governor of New York and as a broker.

He moved to Fort Schuyler (now Utica), in 1797, where he worked as an agent of the great landed estate of the Earl of Bath.

Walker was elected as a Federalist to the Seventh Congress (March 4, 1801 - March 3, 1803). After his tenure, he declined to be a candidate for renomination in 1802.

== Personal life ==
=== Relationship with Steuben and North ===
Together with a fellow aide-de-camp, William North, he was formally adopted by Steuben, and made his heir. Some historians believe that these "extraordinary intense emotional relationships" were romantic, and given Steuben's reported earlier behavior, it has been suggested it would have been out-of-character for him if they were not. It has also been posited that while Walker held Steuben in high esteem, and had no scruples about exploiting his attraction for him, he had no intention of reciprocating. However, without more substantive evidence turning up, the exact nature of the relationships is impossible to conclusively define.

Walker maintained a close relationship with Steuben after the war. Steuben lived with Walker and his wife in Manhattan for a period when Walker was a broker. Walker visited Steuben almost every year at his property and helped manage his business and finances with North.

It has also been suggested that North and Walker held a romantic relationship, but like with Steuben this is difficult to be certain of. Nevertheless, Walker remained North's closest friend until their deaths. Walker was named as a sponsor of North's daughter Adelia at her baptism.

=== Family ===
Walker married a Quaker woman named Mary Robinson on August 30, 1784. Together they raised Walker's natural daughter, Eliza, and Mary, his wife's niece.

Eliza was described as "quite a Frenchwoman in her manners and language" by her close friend, Alexander Bryan Johnson. She was enmeshed in French society, and when in New York would entertain French visitors such as General Moreau. Her first marriage was to the Marquis de Villehaut, but they divorced by 1812. Her second marriage was in 1823 to a French officer and Bonapartist, Col. Michel Combe (sometimes written as "Combes"). In 1815 Combe fled to America after a warrant was put out for his arrest based on suspicions he had been spreading Napoleonic propaganda and held "boundless fanaticism for the usurper." The couple settled in Utica on what was now her land after the death of her father, who had bequeathed a "considerable" portion of his property to her. When Louis Philippe I ascended the throne, they returned to France. Combe died at the Siege of Constantine. A statue was erected in his honor in his hometown of Feurs in 1839.

Though Eliza was the only natural born child recognized as Walker's, there may have been other unacknowledged children. While handling Eliza's property in New York, Alexander Bryan Johnson was informed by an unnamed gentleman that the elderly woman Eliza had instructed Johnson to give a routine sum of five dollars was not a former servant, as Eliza claimed, but her sister. The gentleman also claimed to be married to another sister, both women being Benjamin Walker's progeny. The proof he provided was a letter Eliza wrote to the gentleman's wife, which Johnson recognized as her handwriting. According to Johnson, the gentleman took the case to court and was able to win claim to her property.

Benjamin Walker built a mansion for his family on Broad Street which was torn down in 1932. It was built upon 15 acres of land with a large farm attached.

Walker owned two slaves in 1800, and none in 1790, according to the US Census.

Walker died in Utica, New York, on January 13, 1818. He was first interred in the Old Village Burying Ground on Water Street but was exhumed and reinterred in Forest Hill Cemetery, Utica on June 17, 1875.

== Legacy ==
Walker Street in Manhattan is named in his honor. Walker appears in John Trumbull's 1824 painting General George Washington Resigning His Commission, which was featured on the reverse of the United States five-thousand-dollar bill.

U.S. House of Representatives
Preceded by Jonas Platt	Member of the U.S. House of Representatives from New York's 9th congressional district March 4, 1801 – March 3, 1803	Succeeded by Killian Van Rensselaer
