= Asa Sanger House =

Historic house in Massachusetts, United States

- U.S. National Register of Historic Places
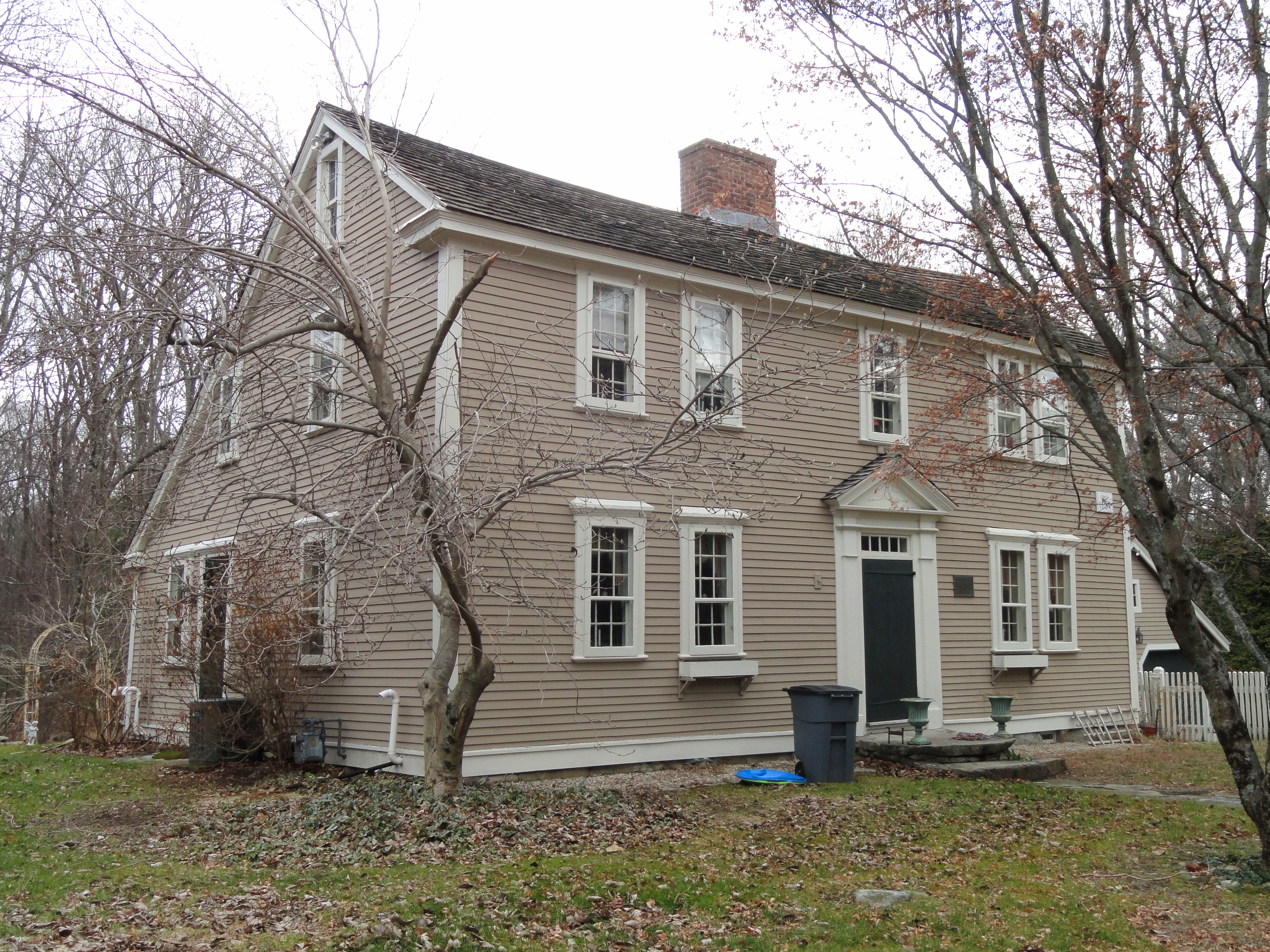

- Location within Massachusetts
- Location: 70 Washington Street, Sherborn, Massachusetts
- Coordinates: 42°14′8″N 71°22′52″W
- Architectural style: Georgian
- MPS: Sherborn MRA
- NRHP reference No.: 86000507
- Added to NRHP: January 3, 1986

The Asa Sanger House is a historic house in Sherborn, Massachusetts. The oldest portion of this 2 1/2-story timber-frame house is, based on architectural evidence, believed to date to the early decades of the 18th century. It has transitional styling, including features of First Period and later Georgian styling. At the time of the American Revolutionary War the house was owned by Asa Sanger, whose family was prominent in town civic and economic affairs.

The house was listed on the National Register of Historic Places in 1986.

== See also ==
- National Register of Historic Places listings in Sherborn, Massachusetts
