= Baggio Wallenburg =

Dutch footballer

Personal information
- Date of birth: 30 March 1999 (age 27)
- Place of birth: Houten, Netherlands
- Height: 1.73 m (5 ft 8 in)
- Position: Defender

Team information
- Current team: DHSC

Youth career
- –2007: SV Houten
- 2017–2018: PSV

Senior career*
Years	Team	Apps	(Gls)
2018–2020	Jong PSV	44	(0)
2020–2021	Feyenoord U21	0	(0)
2021–	DHSC		

International career^{‡}
2015	Netherlands U16	5	(0)
- * Club domestic league appearances and goals as of 25 September 2019 ‡ National team caps and goals as of 15 March 2015

Baggio Wallenburg (born 30 March 1999) is a Dutch footballer who currently plays as a defender for DHSC.

== Club career ==
He made his Eerste Divisie debut for Jong PSV on 23 March 2018 in a game against Jong FC Utrecht as an 80th-minute substitute for Kenneth Paal.
