= Lycée César Baggio =

Senior high school in Lille, France

Coordinates: 50.6177°N 3.0676°E

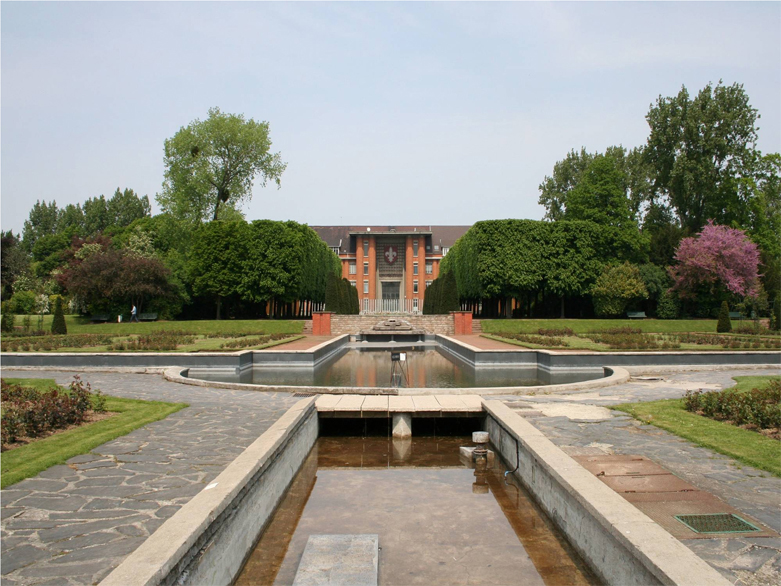
School building

Lycée César Baggio is a senior high school in Lille, France.

It was formed in the year 1961 when the Collège Technique Baggio was converted into a senior high school.
