= Bag (Bužim) =

Village in Bužim, Bosnia and Herzegovina

- Village
- Location within Bosnia and Herzegovina
- Coordinates: 45.046817°N 16.016100°E
- Country: Bosnia and Herzegovina
- Entity: Federation of Bosnia and Herzegovina
- Canton: Una-Sana
- Municipality: Bužim

Area
  - Total: 3.22 sq mi (8.33 km^{2})

Population (2013)
  - Total: 571
  - Density: 178/sq mi (68.5/km^{2})
- Time zone: UTC+1 (CET)
  - Summer (DST): UTC+2 (CEST)

Bag is a settlement in Bužim, in Bosnia and Herzegovina.

== Demographics ==
According to the 2013 census, its population was 571.

Ethnicity in 2013
Ethnicity	Number	Percentage
Bosniaks	570	99.8%
Croats	1	0.2%
Total	571	100%
