= Richard Baggs =

English cricketer

Richard Baggs (born 19 November 1974) was an English cricketer. He was a left-handed batsman and a right-arm medium-fast bowler who played for Devon.

== Early life ==
Baggs was born on 19 November 1974 in Eastbourne, Sussex.

== Career ==
Baggs, who played a single match for Hampshire Second XI in 1994, played with Devon between 1995 and 2001. He made two NatWest Trophy appearances for the side, the first in 1997, against Leicestershire, in which he scored 5 runs, and his second in 1999, against Worcestershire, in which he scored 18 runs.
