= Richard Sanger III House =

Historic house in Massachusetts, United States

- U.S. National Register of Historic Places
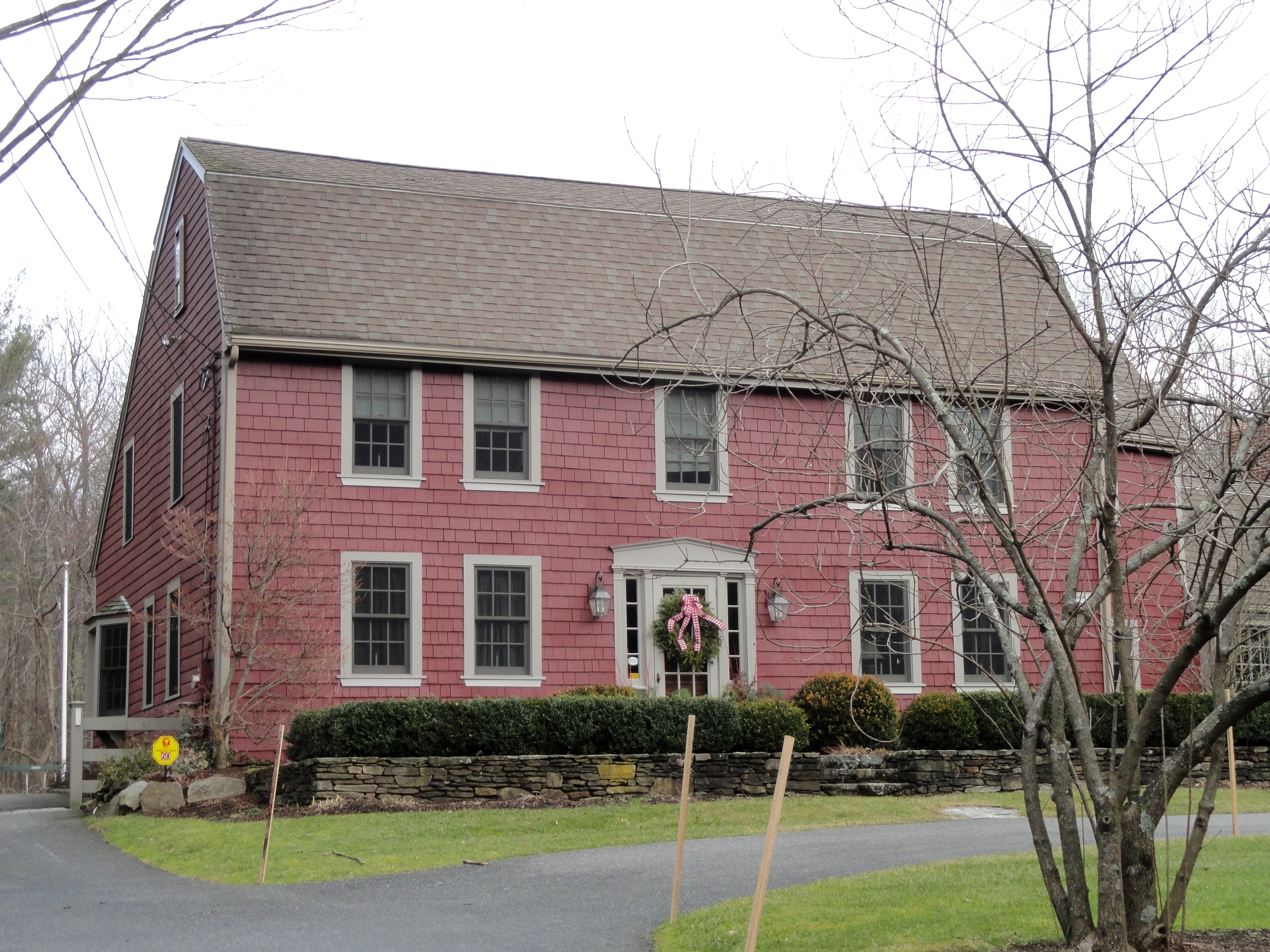

- Location within Massachusetts Location within the United States
- Location: 60 Washington Street, Sherborn, Massachusetts
- Coordinates: 42°14′9″N 71°22′48″W
- Built: 1734
- Architectural style: Georgian
- MPS: Sherborn MRA
- NRHP reference No.: 86000508
- Added to NRHP: January 3, 1986

The Richard Sanger III House is a historic house in Sherborn, Massachusetts. It is a 2 1/2-story timber-frame house, five bays wide, with a side gambrel roof and clapboard siding. The windows of the front facade are symmetrically placed, but the door is slightly off-center, flanked by sidelight windows and topped by a gabled pediment. The house was built c. 1734, with a rear leanto added around 1775. It is unusual in the town as an 18th-century gambrel-roofed house with leanto. Sanger was the son of a Boston merchant, and one of the few people on the town documented to own slaves.

The house was listed on the National Register of Historic Places in 1986.

== See also ==
- National Register of Historic Places listings in Sherborn, Massachusetts
