= Bagg's Hotel =

Coordinates: 43°6′9″N 75°13′19″W

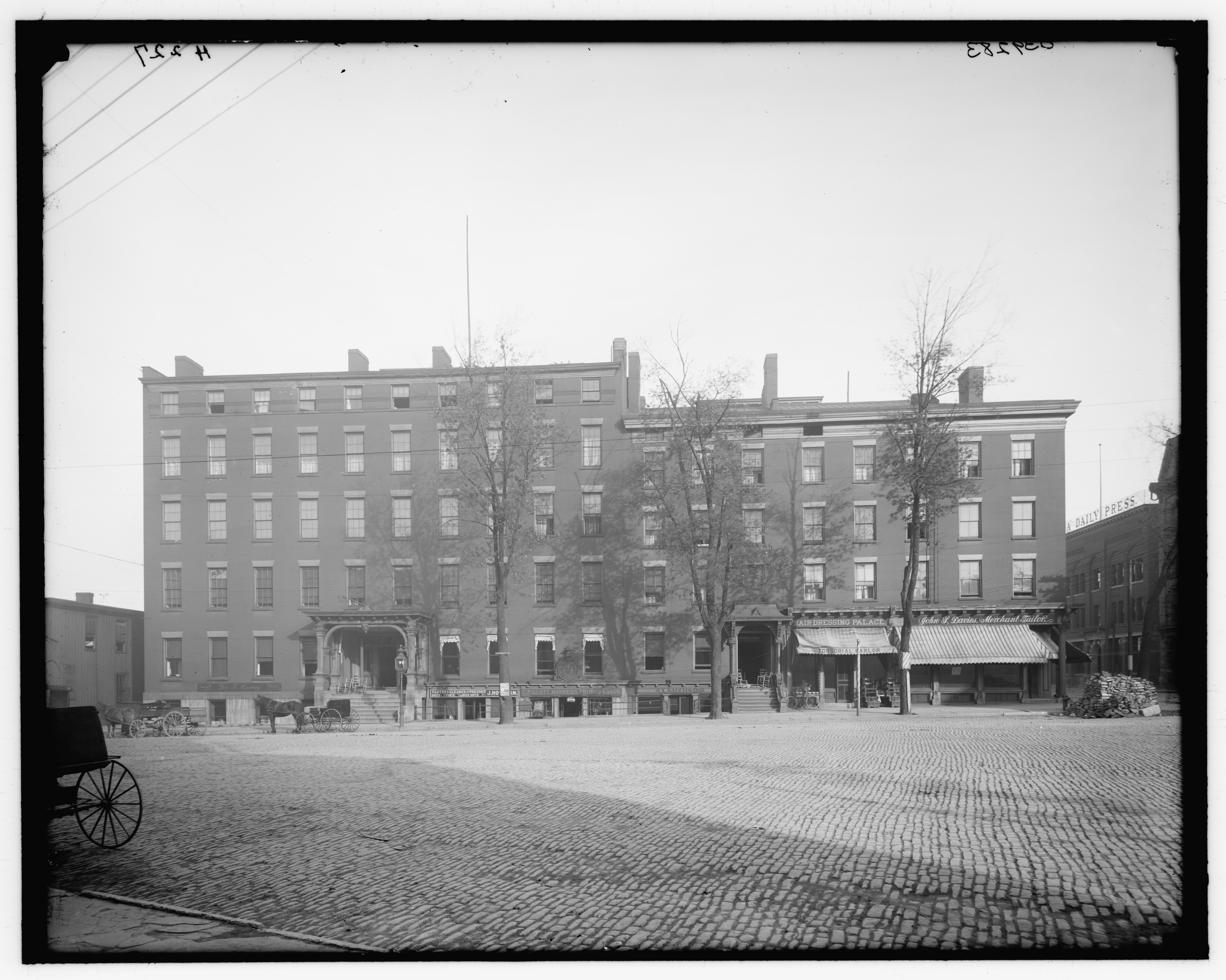
Bagg's Hotel, c. 1900-1915

Bagg's Hotel was located in Utica, New York. The Bagg's Tavern preceded it and hosted General George Washington, General Lafayette, Henry Clay and General Ulysses S. Grant. It was a log house founded in 1794 by Moses Bagg. Bagg's Square Memorial Park marks the historic location.

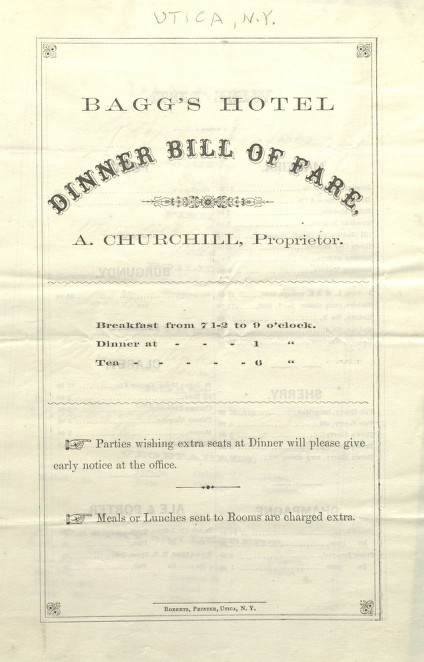
Bagg's Hotel menu on December 6, 1863

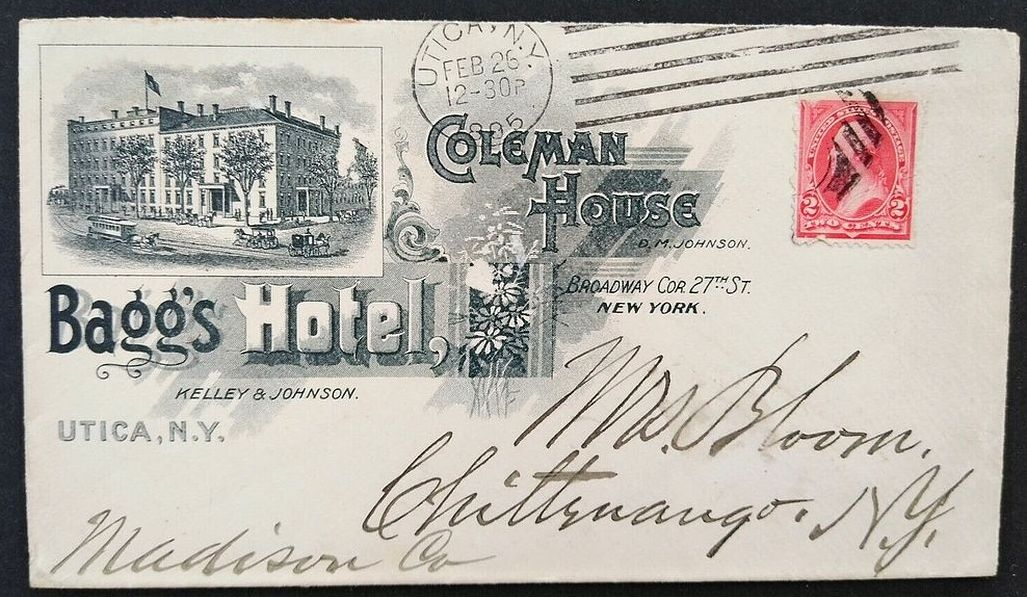
Bagg's Square advertising cover, postmarked 1905

== Establishment ==
Moses Bagg, a blacksmith, first came to the Old Fort Schuyler on a flat boat up the Mohawk River in 1793. In 1794 he purchased four acres of land from Joseph Ballou for his business on Main Street. The same year, he constructed a hotel for travelers waiting for their horses to be shoed. It grew from being a "shanty", to a two story wooden building, and was taken over by Moses Bagg Jr. after his father's death in 1805. Guests included Thomas Moore, Joseph Bonaparte, Aaron Burr, Chang and Eng Bunker and Washington Irving.

The original site was bought out and built into what became known as the Northern Hotel until it burned down in 1870. Meanwhile, Baggs Jr. built his hotel across the street taking on the name "Shepard’s Hotel". D.M. Johnson managed the hotel for 15 years until his death in 1902.

== Nineteenth century ==
The "Utica Tally-Ho Stage Coach" transited travelers to and from the hotel. There was a fire in the "wineroom" in 1895.

== Present day ==
The "Bagg's Square" name is still used in Utica, New York to refer to part of the downtown district.

== Sources ==
- Bagg, Moses Mears (1877). The pioneers of Utica. Utica, N.Y. : Curtiss & Childs. "Full title: The pioneers of Utica : being sketches of its inhabitants and its institutions, with the civil history of the place, from the earliest settlement to the year 1825, the era of the opening of the Erie Canal"
