= Old Fort Schuyler =

Fort in New York during the American Revolutionary War

Coordinates: 43°6.259′N 75°13.483′W

Old Fort Schuyler was a Revolutionary War fort that existed in Upstate New York. It is the present-day location of the city of Utica.
