= Bag, Kohgiluyeh and Boyer-Ahmad =

Bag باگ
- Village
- Location within Iran
- Coordinates: 31°01′17″N 51°14′13″E
- Country: Iran
- Province: Kohgiluyeh and Boyer-Ahmad
- County: Dana
- Bakhsh: Pataveh
- Rural District: Pataveh

Population (2006)
  - Total: 659
- Time zone: UTC+3:30 (IRST)
  - Summer (DST): UTC+4:30 (IRDT)

Bag (Persian: باگ, also Romanized as Bāg) is a village in Pataveh Rural District, Pataveh District, Dana County, Kohgiluyeh and Boyer-Ahmad Province, Iran. At the 2006 census, its population was 659, in 140 families.
