= 22nd New York State Legislature =

New York state legislative session

←	21st	23rd	→
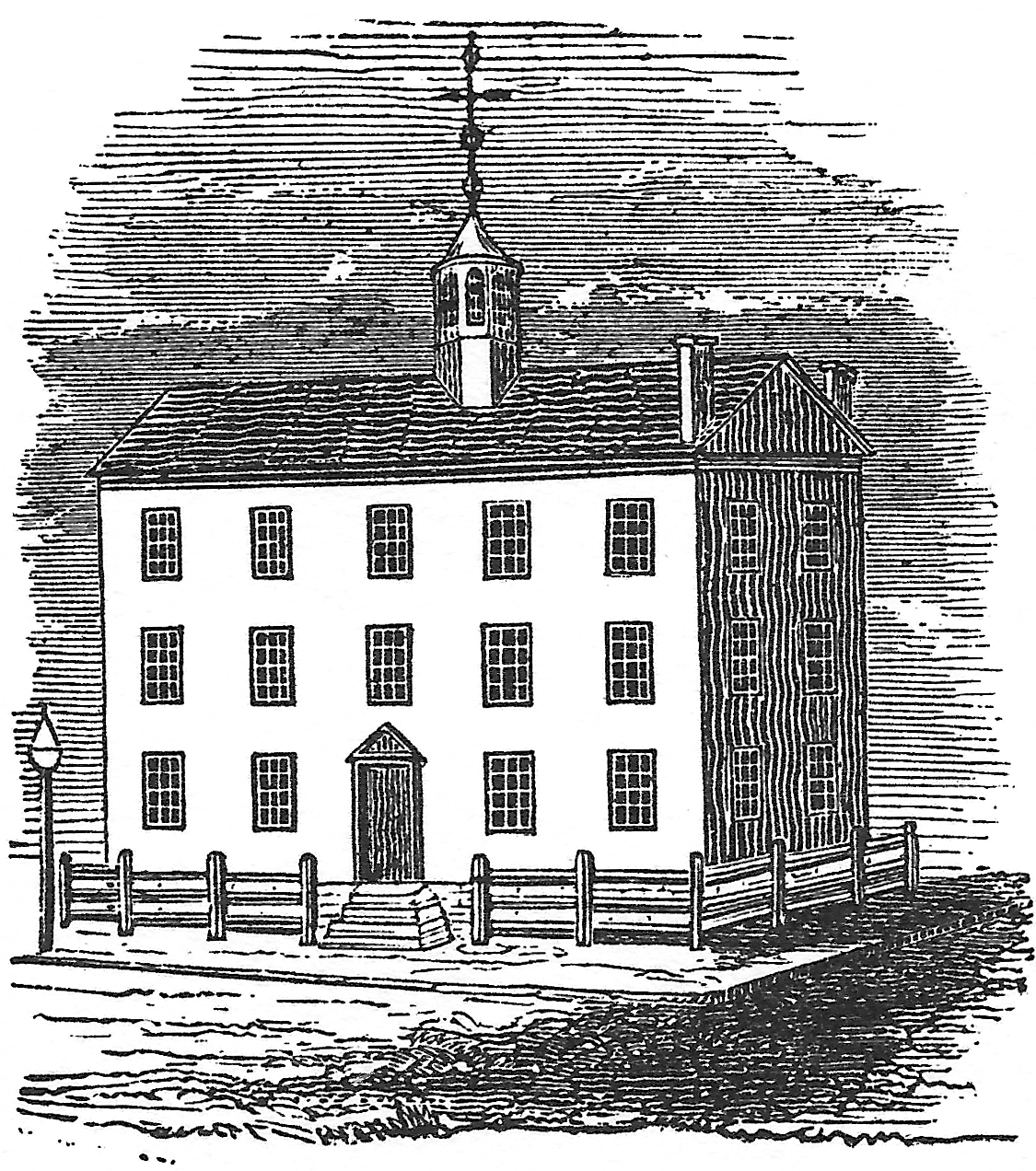
- The Old Albany City Hall (undated)

Overview
- Legislative body: New York State Legislature
- Jurisdiction: New York, United States
- Term: July 1, 1798 – June 30, 1799

Senate
- Members: 43
- President: Lt. Gov. Stephen Van Rensselaer (Fed.)
- Party control: Federalist (32-11)

Assembly
- Members: 108
- Speaker: Dirck Ten Broeck (Fed.)
- Party control: Federalist

Sessions
- 1st: August 9 – 27, 1798
- 2nd: January 2 – April 3, 1799

The 22nd New York State Legislature, consisting of the New York State Senate and the New York State Assembly, met from August 9, 1798, to April 3, 1799, during the fourth year of John Jay's governorship, in Albany.

== Background ==
Under the provisions of the New York Constitution of 1777, amended by the re-apportionment of March 4, 1796, Senators were elected on general tickets in the senatorial districts for four-year terms. They were divided into four classes, and every year about one fourth of the Senate seats came up for election. Assemblymen were elected countywide on general tickets to a one-year term, the whole assembly being renewed annually.

In March 1786, the Legislature enacted that future Legislatures meet on the first Tuesday of January of each year unless called earlier by the governor. In 1797, Albany was declared the State capital, and all subsequent Legislatures have been meeting there ever since.

On April 26, 1797, State Senator Joshua Sands was appointed as Collector of the Port of New York; and on September 24, 1797, State Senator Andrew Onderdonk died; leaving two vacancies in the Southern District.

U.S. Senator John Sloss Hobart (Fed.) vacated his seat on April 16, 1798, when he was appointed to the United States District Court for the District of New York, and on May 5, Gov. John Jay appointed William North (Fed.) to fill the vacancy temporarily.

In 1798, Chenango County was created from parts of Herkimer and Tioga counties, and was apportioned two seats in the Assembly, one each taken from Herkimer and Tioga. Oneida County was created from Herkimer, and was apportioned three seats in the Assembly, taken from Herkimer. Rockland County was created from Orange County, and was apportioned one seat in the Assembly, taken from Orange. Besides, two seats from Ulster Co. and one seat from Albany Co. were transferred to Orange Co.

At this time the politicians were divided into two opposing political parties: the Federalists and the Democratic-Republicans.

== Elections ==
The State election was held from April 24 to 26, 1798. Gov. John Jay and Lt. Gov. Stephen Van Rensselaer (both Fed.) were re-elected.

Senators Ambrose Spencer (Middle D.), Leonard Gansevoort (Eastern D.), John Frey and Thomas R. Gold (both Western D.) were re-elected. David Gelston, John Schenck (both Southern D.), Ebenezer Foote (Middle D.), John Sanders (Eastern D.); and Assemblymen DeWitt Clinton (Southern D.) and Frederick Gettman (Western D.) were also elected to full terms in the Senate. Senator Richard Hatfield (Southern D.) was re-elected, but only to a one-year term to fill a vacancy. Assemblyman William Denning (Southern D.) was elected to the Senate to a two-year term, to fill the other vacancy.

== Sessions ==
Gov. Jay called a special session of the Legislature when it seemed that a war with France was likely to break out, and he deemed it necessary to prepare the State for defence. The Legislature met on August 9, 1798, at the Old City Hall in Albany, New York; and adjourned on August 27.

Federalist Dirck Ten Broeck was re-elected Speaker with 58 votes against 37 for Dem.-Rep. John Swartwout.

On August 17, 1798, the Legislature elected James Watson (Fed.) to fill the vacancy in the U.S. Senate.

The Legislature met for the regular session on January 2, 1799; and both Houses adjourned on April 3.

Near the end of the session, an "Act for Supplying the City of New-York with Pure and Wholesome Water" was passed, which contained hidden in its text the charter to set up the Bank of the Manhattan Company.

== State Senate ==
=== Districts ===
- The Southern District (9 seats) consisted of Kings, New York, Queens, Richmond, Suffolk and Westchester counties.
- The Middle District (12 seats) consisted of Dutchess, Orange, Ulster, Columbia, Delaware and Rockland counties.
- The Eastern District (11 seats) consisted of Washington, Clinton, Rensselaer, Albany and Saratoga counties.
- The Western District (11 seats) consisted of Montgomery, Herkimer, Ontario, Otsego, Tioga, Onondaga, Schoharie, Steuben, Chenango and Oneida counties.
Note: There are now 62 counties in the State of New York. The counties which are not mentioned in this list had not yet been established, or sufficiently organized, the area being included in one or more of the abovementioned counties.

=== Members ===
The asterisk (*) denotes members of the previous Legislature who continued in office as members of this Legislature. William Denning, DeWitt Clinton and Frederick Gettman changed from the Assembly to the Senate.

District	Senators	Term left	Party	Notes
Southern	Samuel Jones*	1 year	Federalist	also New York State Comptroller
Southern	Richard Hatfield*	1 year	Federalist	elected to fill vacancy, in place of Joshua Sands
Southern	Samuel Haight*	2 years	Federalist	
Southern	William Denning*	2 years	Dem.-Rep.	elected to fill vacancy, in place of Andrew Onderdonk; elected to the Council of Appointment
Southern	Selah Strong*	2 years	Federalist	
Southern	Ezra L'Hommedieu*	3 years	Dem.-Rep.	
Southern	DeWitt Clinton*	4 years	Dem.-Rep.	
Southern	David Gelston	4 years	Dem.-Rep.	also Surrogate of New York County
Southern	John Schenck	4 year	Dem.-Rep.	
Middle	Abraham Schenck*	1 year	Dem.-Rep.	
Middle	Christopher Tappen*	1 year	Dem.-Rep.	
Middle	Thomas Tillotson*	1 year	Dem.-Rep.	
Middle	Robert Sands*	2 years	Federalist	
Middle	James Savage*	2 years	Federalist	
Middle	Peter Silvester*	2 years	Federalist	
Middle	William Thompson*	2 years	Federalist	
Middle	John Addison*	3 years	Dem.-Rep.	
Middle	Peter Cantine Jr.*	3 years	Federalist	
Middle	James G. Graham*	3 years	Dem.-Rep.	
Middle	Ebenezer Foote	4 years	Federalist	also Delaware County Clerk; elected to the Council of Appointment
Middle	Ambrose Spencer*	4 years	Dem.-Rep.	also Assistant Attorney General (3rd D.)
Eastern	Zina Hitchcock*	1 year	Federalist	
Eastern	Ebenezer Russell*	1 year	Federalist	
Eastern	Moses Vail*	1 year	Federalist	
Eastern	Leonard Bronck*	2 years	Federalist	
Eastern	James Gordon*	2 years	Federalist	
Eastern	Ebenezer Clark*	3 years	Federalist	elected to the Council of Appointment
Eastern	Anthony Ten Eyck*	3 years	Federalist	
Eastern	Jacobus Van Schoonhoven*	3 years	Federalist	
Eastern	Abraham Van Vechten*	3 years	Federalist	also Recorder of the City of Albany
Eastern	Leonard Gansevoort*	4 years	Federalist	
Eastern	John Sanders	4 years	Federalist	
Western	Vincent Mathews*	1 year	Federalist	
Western	Joseph White*	1 year	Federalist	
Western	Jacob Morris*	2 years	Federalist	
Western	Jedediah Sanger*	2 years	Federalist	also First Judge of the Oneida County Court
Western	Thomas Morris*	3 years	Federalist	
Western	Michael Myers*	3 years	Federalist	
Western	Seth Phelps*	3 years	Federalist	
Western	William Beekman	4 years	Federalist	
Western	John Frey*	4 years	Federalist	elected to the Council of Appointment
Western	Frederick Gettman*	4 years	Federalist	
Western	Thomas R. Gold*	4 years	Federalist	also Assistant Attorney General (7th D.)

=== Employees ===
- Clerk: Abraham B. Bancker

== State Assembly ==
=== Districts ===
- Albany County (9 seats)
- Chenango County (2 seats)
- Clinton County (1 seat)
- Columbia County (6 seats)
- Delaware County (2 seats)
- Dutchess County (10 seats)
- Herkimer County (3 seats)
- Kings County (1 seat)
- Montgomery County (6 seats)
- The City and County of New York (13 seats)
- Oneida County (3 seats)
- Onondaga County (2 seats)
- Ontario and Steuben counties (2 seats)
- Orange County (5 seats)
- Otsego County (4 seats)
- Queens County (4 seats)
- Rensselaer County (6 seats)
- Richmond County (1 seat)
- Rockland County (1 seat)
- Saratoga County (5 seats)
- Schoharie County (1 seat)
- Suffolk County (4 seats)
- Tioga County (1 seat)
- Ulster County (5 seats)
- Washington County (6 seats)
- Westchester County (5 seats)
Note: There are now 62 counties in the State of New York. The counties which are not mentioned in this list had not yet been established, or sufficiently organized, the area being included in one or more of the abovementioned counties.

=== Assemblymen ===
The asterisk (*) denotes members of the previous Legislature who continued as members of this Legislature.

District	Assemblymen	Party	Notes
Albany	Thomas E. Barker*	Federalist	
Albany	James Bill		
Albany	Johann Jost Dietz*	Federalist	
Albany	Prince Doty	Federalist	
Albany	Andrew N. Heermance*		
Albany	Jeremiah Lansingh		
Albany	Philip P. Schuyler*		
Albany	Joseph Shurtleff	Federalist	
Albany	Dirck Ten Broeck*	Federalist	re-elected Speaker
Chenango	Obadiah German	Federalist	
Chenango	Nathaniel King		
Clinton	Asa Adgate	Dem.-Rep.	
Columbia	Elisha Gilbert		
Columbia	Killian Hogeboom*	Dem.-Rep.	
Columbia	Charles McKinstry	Federalist	
Columbia	John McKinstry		
Columbia	Peter B. Ten Broeck		
Columbia	Samuel Ten Broeck*	Dem.-Rep.	
Delaware	Elias Butler		
Delaware	Erastus Root	Dem.-Rep.	
Dutchess	Abraham Adriance	Dem.-Rep.	
Dutchess	Lemuel Clift*	Federalist	
Dutchess	Henry Dodge	Federalist	
Dutchess	Robert Johnston	Dem.-Rep.	
Dutchess	Ebenezer Mott		
Dutchess	William Pearce		
Dutchess	Platt Smith		
Dutchess	Jonathan Soule		
Dutchess	William Taber	Dem.-Rep.	
Dutchess	John Van Benthuysen	Dem.-Rep.	
Herkimer	Ludwick Campbell*		
Herkimer	John Cummins Jr.		
Herkimer	Phineas Gates		
Kings	Johannes I. Lott		
Montgomery	Archibald McIntyre	Dem.-Rep.	
Montgomery	Henry Pawling		
Montgomery	Stephen Reynolds		
Montgomery	Jacob Snell*	Dem.-Rep.	
Montgomery	Simon Veeder		
Montgomery	Peter Voorhis		
New York	Philip I. Arcularius*	Dem.-Rep.	
New York	William Boyd*	Dem.-Rep.	
New York	Ebenezer S. Burling*	Dem.-Rep.	
New York	Aaron Burr*	Dem.-Rep.	
New York	James Fairlie	Dem.-Rep.	
New York	Richard Furman	Federalist	
New York	James Hunt*	Dem.-Rep.	
New York	Elias Nexsen	Dem.-Rep.	
New York	John B. Prevost	Dem.-Rep.	
New York	Ezekiel Robins	Dem.-Rep.	
New York	Thomas Storm	Dem.-Rep.	
New York	John Swartwout	Dem.-Rep.	
New York	John A. Wolfe	Dem.-Rep.	
Oneida	Abel French	Federalist	
Oneida	Henry McNeil*	Federalist	previously a member from Herkimer Co.
Oneida	David Ostrom	Federalist	
Onondaga	Edward Paine		
Onondaga	John Richardson	Federalist	
Ontario and Steuben	Amos Hall*	Federalist	
Ontario and Steuben	Charles Williamson*		
Orange	John Blake Jr.	Dem.-Rep.	
Orange	James Burt*	Dem.-Rep.	
Orange	Moses Philips		
Orange	Hendrick Smith		
Orange	David M. Westcott		
Otsego	Joshua Dewey*		
Otsego	Benjamin Gilbert		
Otsego	Francis Henry*	Federalist	
Otsego	Jedediah Peck	Federalist	also judge of the Otsego County Court until March 9, 1799, when he was removed
Queens	Robert Moore	Federalist	
Queens	William Mott	Federalist	
Queens	John I. Skidmore*	Dem.-Rep.	
Queens	John M. Smith	Federalist	
Rensselaer	Jacob A. Fort*	Federalist	
Rensselaer	Daniel Gray*	Federalist	
Rensselaer	Jonathan Hoag		
Rensselaer	Cornelius Lansing		
Rensselaer	John W. Schermerhorn		
Rensselaer	John I. Van Rensselaer		
Richmond	Paul I. Micheau*	Federalist	
Rockland	Benjamin Coe*		previously a member from Orange Co.
Saratoga	Seth C. Baldwin*		
Saratoga	Samuel Clark*		
Saratoga	Adam Comstock*	Dem.-Rep.	
Saratoga	Henry Corl Jr.		
Saratoga	James Warren		
Schoharie	Peter Swart	Dem.-Rep.	
Suffolk	Nicoll Floyd		
Suffolk	Jared Landon	Dem.-Rep.	
Suffolk	John Smith	Dem.-Rep.	
Suffolk	Joshua Smith Jr.		
Tioga	Matthew Carpenter		
Ulster	Gerrit Abeel		
Ulster	Jacobus S. Bruyn*	Dem.-Rep.	
Ulster	John A. DeWitt*		
Ulster	Peter Lefevre Jr.		
Ulster	Martin G. Schuneman	Dem.-Rep.	
Washington	Seth Crocker		
Washington	David Hopkins	Dem.-Rep.	
Washington	Charles Kane*		
Washington	Edward Savage*	Dem.-Rep.	
Washington	Philip Smith		
Washington	David Thomas	Dem.-Rep.	
Westchester	William Adams*		
Westchester	Israel Honeywell		
Westchester	Elijah Lee*		
Westchester	Abel Smith*	Dem.-Rep.	
Westchester	Charles Teed*	Federalist	

=== Employees ===
- Clerk: James Van Ingen
- Sergeant-at-Arms: Robert Hunter
- Doorkeeper: Peter Hansen

== Sources ==
- The New York Civil List compiled by Franklin Benjamin Hough (Weed, Parsons and Co., 1858) [see pg. 108f for Senate districts; pg. 117 for senators; pg. 148f for Assembly districts; pg. 172 for assemblymen]
- Election result Assembly, Dutchess Co. at project "A New Nation Votes", compiled by Phil Lampi, hosted by Tufts University Digital Library
- Election result Assembly, Montgomery Co. at project "A New Nation Votes"
- Election result Assembly, Saratoga Co. at project "A New Nation Votes"
- Election result Assembly, Washington Co. at project "A New Nation Votes"
- Election result Assembly Speaker at project "A New Nation Votes"
