= 23rd New York State Legislature =

New York state legislative session

←	22nd	24th	→
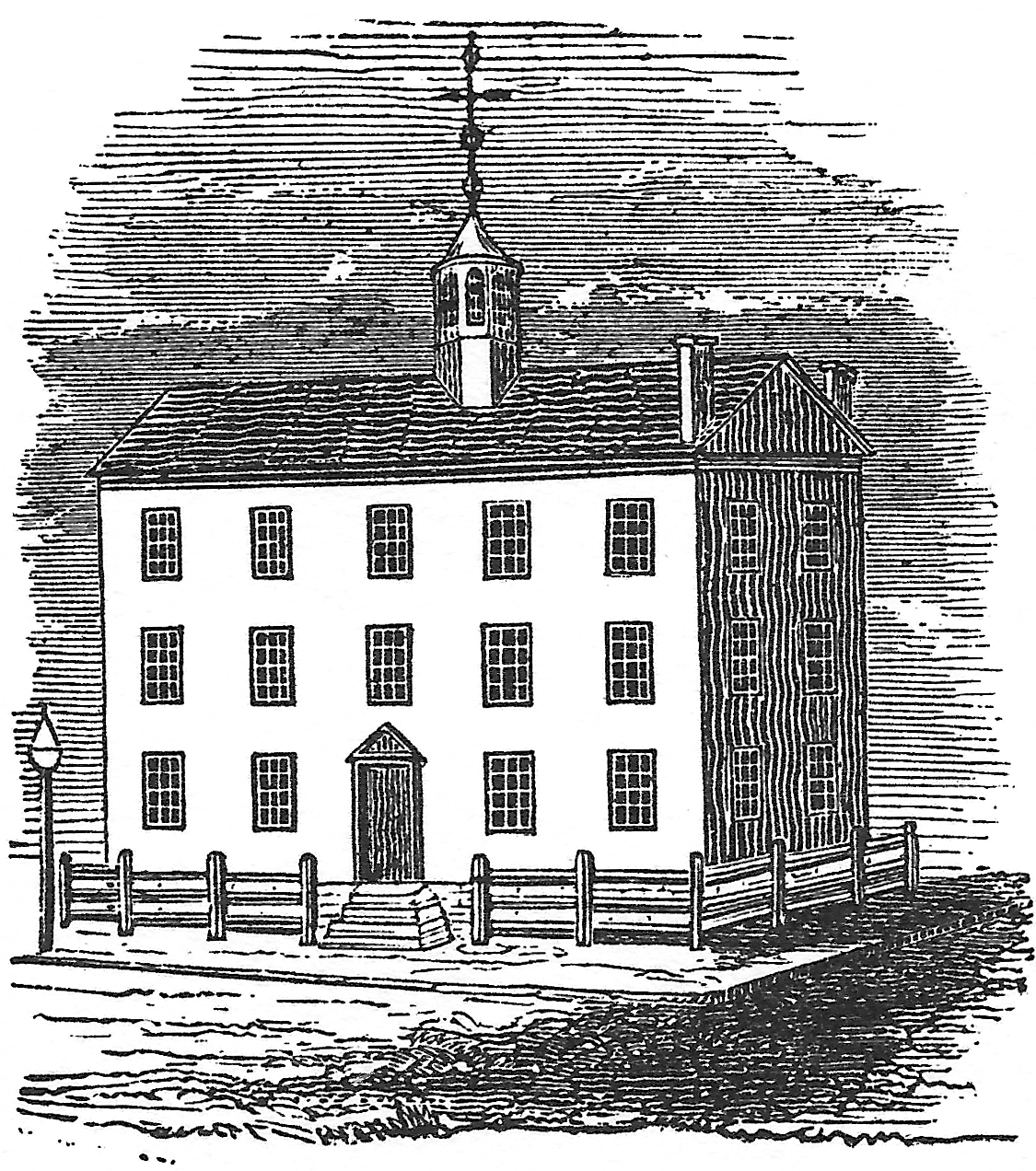
- The Old Albany City Hall (undated)

Overview
- Legislative body: New York State Legislature
- Jurisdiction: New York, United States
- Term: July 1, 1799 – June 30, 1800

Senate
- Members: 43
- President: Lt. Gov. Stephen Van Rensselaer (Fed.)
- Party control: Federalist (32-11)

Assembly
- Members: 108
- Speaker: Dirck Ten Broeck (Fed.)
- Party control: Federalist

Sessions
- 1st: January 28, 1800 – April 8, 1800

The 23rd New York State Legislature, consisting of the New York State Senate and the New York State Assembly, met from January 28 to April 8, 1800, during the fifth year of John Jay's governorship, in Albany.

== Background ==
Under the provisions of the New York Constitution of 1777, amended by the re-apportionment of March 4, 1796, Senators were elected on general tickets in the senatorial districts for four-year terms. They were divided into four classes, and every year about one fourth of the Senate seats came up for election. Assemblymen were elected countywide on general tickets to a one-year term, the whole assembly being renewed annually.

In 1797, Albany was declared the State capital, and all subsequent Legislatures have been meeting there ever since. In 1799, the Legislature enacted that future Legislatures meet on the last Tuesday of January of each year unless called earlier by the governor.

Congressman Jonathan N. Havens (D.-R.) died on October 25, 1799. Assemblyman John Smith (D.-R.) was elected in a special election in December 1799 to fill the vacancy.

In 1799, Cayuga County was split from Onondaga County, and was apportioned one seat in the Assembly, taken from Onondaga. Essex County was split from Clinton County, but remained in a double-county Assembly district.

At this time the politicians were divided into two opposing political parties: the Federalists and the Democratic-Republicans.

== Elections ==
The State election was held from April 30 to May 2, 1799. Senators Richard Hatfield (Southern D.), Zina Hitchcock, Ebenezer Russell, Moses Vail (all three Eastern D.) and Vincent Mathews (Western D.) were re-elected. John B. Coles (Southern D.), Isaac Bloom, John Hathorn, John Suffern (all three Middle D.) and Moss Kent (Western D.) were also elected to the Senate.

== Sessions ==
The Legislature met on January 28, 1800, at the Old City Hall in Albany; and adjourned on April 8.

Federalist Dirck Ten Broeck was re-elected Speaker without opposition.

The Legislature reduced the salary of the New York State Comptroller from $3,000 to $2,500 whereupon Samuel Jones declined to be re-appointed. On March 12, 1800, the Council of Appointment chose Assemblyman John Vernon Henry to succeed Jones.

On March 12, 1800, a bill was proposed to divide the State into districts to elect presidential electors by popular ballot. This was rejected by the Federalist majority [vote 55 to 47], and the electors continued to be chosen by joint ballot of the State Legislature.

On March 19, 1800, U.S. Senator James Watson (Fed.) resigned after his appointment as Naval Officer of the Port of New York. On April 3, 1800, the Legislature elected Gouverneur Morris (Fed.) to fill the vacancy.

== State Senate ==
=== Districts ===
- The Southern District (9 seats) consisted of Kings, New York, Queens, Richmond, Suffolk and Westchester counties.
- The Middle District (12 seats) consisted of Dutchess, Orange, Ulster, Columbia, Delaware and Rockland counties.
- The Eastern District (11 seats) consisted of Washington, Clinton, Rensselaer, Albany, Saratoga and Essex counties.
- The Western District (11 seats) consisted of Montgomery, Herkimer, Ontario, Otsego, Tioga, Onondaga, Schoharie, Steuben, Chenango, Oneida and Cayuga counties.
Note: There are now 62 counties in the State of New York. The counties which are not mentioned in this list had not yet been established, or sufficiently organized, the area being included in one or more of the abovementioned counties.

=== Members ===
The asterisk (*) denotes members of the previous Legislature who continued in office as members of this Legislature.

District	Senators	Term left	Party	Notes
Southern	Samuel Haight*	1 year	Federalist	elected to the Council of Appointment
Southern	William Denning*	1 year	Dem.-Rep.	
Southern	Selah Strong*	1 year	Federalist	
Southern	Ezra L'Hommedieu*	2 years	Dem.-Rep.	
Southern	DeWitt Clinton*	3 years	Dem.-Rep.	
Southern	David Gelston*	3 years	Dem.-Rep.	also Surrogate of New York County
Southern	John Schenck*	3 year	Dem.-Rep.	
Southern	John B. Coles	4 years	Federalist	
Southern	Richard Hatfield*	4 years	Federalist	
Middle	Robert Sands*	1 year	Federalist	elected to the Council of Appointment
Middle	James Savage*	1 year	Federalist	
Middle	Peter Silvester*	1 year	Federalist	
Middle	William Thompson*	1 year	Federalist	
Middle	John Addison*	2 years	Dem.-Rep.	died in 1800
Middle	Peter Cantine Jr.*	2 years	Federalist	
Middle	James G. Graham*	2 years	Dem.-Rep.	
Middle	Ebenezer Foote*	3 years	Federalist	also Delaware County Clerk
Middle	Ambrose Spencer*	3 years	Dem.-Rep.	also Assistant Attorney General (3rd D.)
Middle	Isaac Bloom	4 years	Dem.-Rep.	
Middle	John Hathorn	4 years	Dem.-Rep.	
Middle	John Suffern	4 years	Dem.-Rep.	
Eastern	Leonard Bronck*	1 year	Federalist	
Eastern	James Gordon*	1 year	Federalist	elected to the Council of Appointment
Eastern	Ebenezer Clark*	2 years	Federalist	
Eastern	Anthony Ten Eyck*	2 years	Federalist	
Eastern	Jacobus Van Schoonhoven*	2 years	Federalist	
Eastern	Abraham Van Vechten*	2 years	Federalist	also Recorder of the City of Albany
Eastern	Leonard Gansevoort*	3 years	Federalist	
Eastern	John Sanders*	3 years	Federalist	
Eastern	Zina Hitchcock*	4 years	Federalist	
Eastern	Ebenezer Russell*	4 years	Federalist	
Eastern	Moses Vail*	4 years	Federalist	
Western	Jacob Morris*	1 year	Federalist	
Western	Jedediah Sanger*	1 year	Federalist	also First Judge of the Oneida County Court
Western	Thomas Morris*	2 years	Federalist	elected in April 1800 to the 7th United States Congress
Western	Michael Myers*	2 years	Federalist	
Western	Seth Phelps*	2 years	Federalist	
Western	William Beekman*	3 years	Federalist	
Western	John Frey*	3 years	Federalist	
Western	Frederick Gettman*	3 years	Federalist	
Western	Thomas R. Gold*	3 years	Federalist	also Assistant Attorney General (7th D.); elected to the Council of Appointment
Western	Vincent Mathews*	4 years	Federalist	
Western	Moss Kent	4 years	Federalist	

=== Employees ===
- Clerk: Abraham B. Bancker

== State Assembly ==
=== Districts ===
- Albany County (9 seats)
- Cayuga County (1 seat)
- Chenango County (2 seats)
- Clinton and Essex counties (1 seat)
- Columbia County (6 seats)
- Delaware County (2 seats)
- Dutchess County (10 seats)
- Herkimer County (3 seats)
- Kings County (1 seat)
- Montgomery County) (6 seats)
- The City and County of New York (13 seats)
- Oneida County (3 seats)
- Onondaga County (1 seat)
- Ontario and Steuben counties (2 seats)
- Orange County (5 seats)
- Otsego County (4 seats)
- Queens County (4 seats)
- Rensselaer County (6 seats)
- Richmond County (1 seat)
- Rockland County (1 seat)
- Saratoga County (5 seats)
- Schoharie County (1 seat)
- Suffolk County (4 seats)
- Tioga County (1 seat)
- Ulster County (5 seats)
- Washington County (6 seats)
- Westchester County (5 seats)
Note: There are now 62 counties in the State of New York. The counties which are not mentioned in this list had not yet been established, or sufficiently organized, the area being included in one or more of the abovementioned counties.

=== Assemblymen ===
The asterisk (*) denotes members of the previous Legislature who continued as members of this Legislature.

County	Assemblymen	Party	Notes
Albany	James Bill*		
Albany	Philip Conine Jr.		
Albany	Johann Jost Dietz*	Federalist	
Albany	Prince Doty*	Federalist	
Albany	John Vernon Henry	Federalist	from March 12, 1800, also New York State Comptroller
Albany	Francis Nicoll	Federalist	
Albany	Joseph Shurtleff*	Federalist	
Albany	Dirck Ten Broeck*	Federalist	re-elected Speaker
Albany	Jacob Winne		
Cayuga	Silas Halsey	Dem.-Rep.	previously a member from Onondaga Co.
Chenango	Peter B. Garnsey		
Chenango	Nathaniel King*		
Clinton and Essex	William Gilliland		
Columbia	Ezekiel Gilbert	Federalist	
Columbia	Robert T. Livingston	Federalist	
Columbia	Charles McKinstry*	Federalist	
Columbia	John Noyes	Federalist	
Columbia	Anson Pratt	Federalist	
Columbia	Jacob R. Van Rensselaer	Federalist	
Delaware	Patrick Lamb		
Delaware	Sluman Wattles		
Dutchess	Abraham Adriance*	Dem.-Rep.	
Dutchess	William Barker	Dem.-Rep.	
Dutchess	William Emott	Dem.-Rep./Fed.	
Dutchess	Joseph C. Field	Dem.-Rep.	
Dutchess	Robert Johnston*	Dem.-Rep.	
Dutchess	Ebenezer Mott*	Dem.-Rep./Fed.	
Dutchess	Isaac Sherwood	Dem.-Rep.	
Dutchess	William Taber*	Dem.-Rep.	
Dutchess	Samuel Towner	Dem.-Rep.	
Dutchess	John Van Benthuysen*	Dem.-Rep.	
Herkimer	Thomas Manly	Federalist	
Herkimer	John Mills	Federalist	
Herkimer	John Meyer	Federalist	
Kings	Jacob Sharpe Jr.		
Montgomery	John Herkimer	Dem.-Rep.	
Montgomery	Cornelius Humfrey	Dem.-Rep.	
Montgomery	Archibald McIntyre*	Dem.-Rep.	
Montgomery	Frederick Sammons		
Montgomery	Jacob Snell*	Dem.-Rep.	
Montgomery	Simon Veeder*	Dem.-Rep.	
New York	John Bogert	Federalist	
New York	Nicholas Evertson	Federalist	
New York	John Oothout	Federalist	
New York	Anthony Post	Federalist	
New York	Caleb S. Riggs	Federalist	
New York	Robert Rutgers	Federalist	
New York	Jacob Sherred	Federalist	
New York	Anthony Steenback	Federalist	
New York	Ebenezer Stevens	Federalist	
New York	Samuel Stillwell	Federalist	
New York	Bernardus Swartwout Jr.	Federalist	
New York	William B. Woolsey	Federalist	
New York	vacant		
Oneida	John Hall		
Oneida	David Ostrom*	Federalist	
Oneida	Nathan Smith		
Onondaga	Ebenezer Butler Jr.		
Ontario and Steuben	Nathaniel Norton		
Ontario and Steuben	Charles Williamson*		
Orange	John Blake Jr.*	Dem.-Rep.	
Orange	Robert R. Burnet		
Orange	James Burt*	Dem.-Rep.	
Orange	Andrew McCord	Dem.-Rep.	
Orange	Seth Marvin		
Otsego	Jedediah Peck*	Dem.-Rep.	
Otsego	Robert Roseboom	Dem.-Rep.	
Otsego	Jacob Ten Broeck		
Otsego	Rensselaer Williams		
Queens	Isaac Denton	Dem.-Rep.	
Queens	Jonah Hallett	Dem.-Rep.	
Queens	Abraham Monfoort	Dem.-Rep.	
Queens	John I. Skidmore*	Dem.-Rep.	
Rensselaer	Jacob A. Fort*	Federalist	
Rensselaer	Daniel Gray*	Federalist	
Rensselaer	James McKown	Federalist	
Rensselaer	Josiah Masters	Dem.-Rep.	
Rensselaer	John W. Schermerhorn*		
Rensselaer	George Tibbits	Federalist	
Richmond	John P. Ryerss		
Rockland	Samuel G. Verbryck		
Saratoga	Daniel Bull		
Saratoga	Samuel Clark*		
Saratoga	Adam Comstock*	Dem.-Rep.	
Saratoga	James Warren*		
Saratoga	Edward A. Watrous		
Schoharie	Storm A. Becker	Federalist	
Suffolk	Nicoll Floyd*	Dem.-Rep.	
Suffolk	Jared Landon*	Dem.-Rep.	
Suffolk	John Smith*	Dem.-Rep.	elected in December 1799 to the 6th United States Congress and took his seat on February 27, 1800, vacating his seat in the Assembly
Suffolk	Silas Wood	Federalist	
Tioga	Samuel Tinkham	Federalist	
Ulster	Charles W. Broadhead		
Ulster	Johannes Bruyn		
Ulster	Moses Cantine		
Ulster	John C. DeWitt		
Ulster	Martin G. Schuneman*	Dem.-Rep.	
Washington	Benjamin Colvin		
Washington	Micajah Pettit		
Washington	Isaac Sargent	Dem.-Rep.	
Washington	Edward Savage*	Dem.-Rep.	
Washington	David Thomas	Dem.-Rep.	elected in April 1800 to the 7th United States Congress
Washington	John Thurman	Federalist	
Westchester	George Comb		
Westchester	Abijah Gilbert	Dem.-Rep.	
Westchester	Nathan Rockwell	Federalist	
Westchester	Abel Smith*	Dem.-Rep.	
Westchester	Charles Teed*	Federalist	

=== Employees ===
- Clerk: James Van Ingen
- Sergeant-at-Arms: Ephraim Hunt
- Doorkeeper: Peter Hansen

== Sources ==
- The New York Civil List compiled by Franklin Benjamin Hough (Weed, Parsons and Co., 1858) [see pg. 108f for Senate districts; pg. 117 for senators; pg. 148f for Assembly districts; pg. 173 for assemblymen]
- Election result Assembly, Columbia Co. at project "A New Nation Votes", compiled by Phil Lampi, hosted by Tufts University Digital Library
- Election result Assembly, Dutchess Co. at project "A New Nation Votes"
- Election result Assembly, Onondaga Co. at project "A New Nation Votes"
- Election result Assembly, Queens Co. at project "A New Nation Votes"
- Election result Assembly, Rensselaer Co. at project "A New Nation Votes"
- Election result Assembly, Schoharie Co. at project "A New Nation Votes"
- Partial election result Senate, Southern D. at project "A New Nation Votes" [gives only votes from New York City]
- Partial election result Senate, Middle D. at project "A New Nation Votes" [gives only votes from Columbia and Dutchess counties]
- Partial election result Senate, Western D. at project "A New Nation Votes" [gives only votes from Onondaga and Schoharie counties]
