= 30th New York State Legislature =

New York state legislative session

←	29th	31st	→
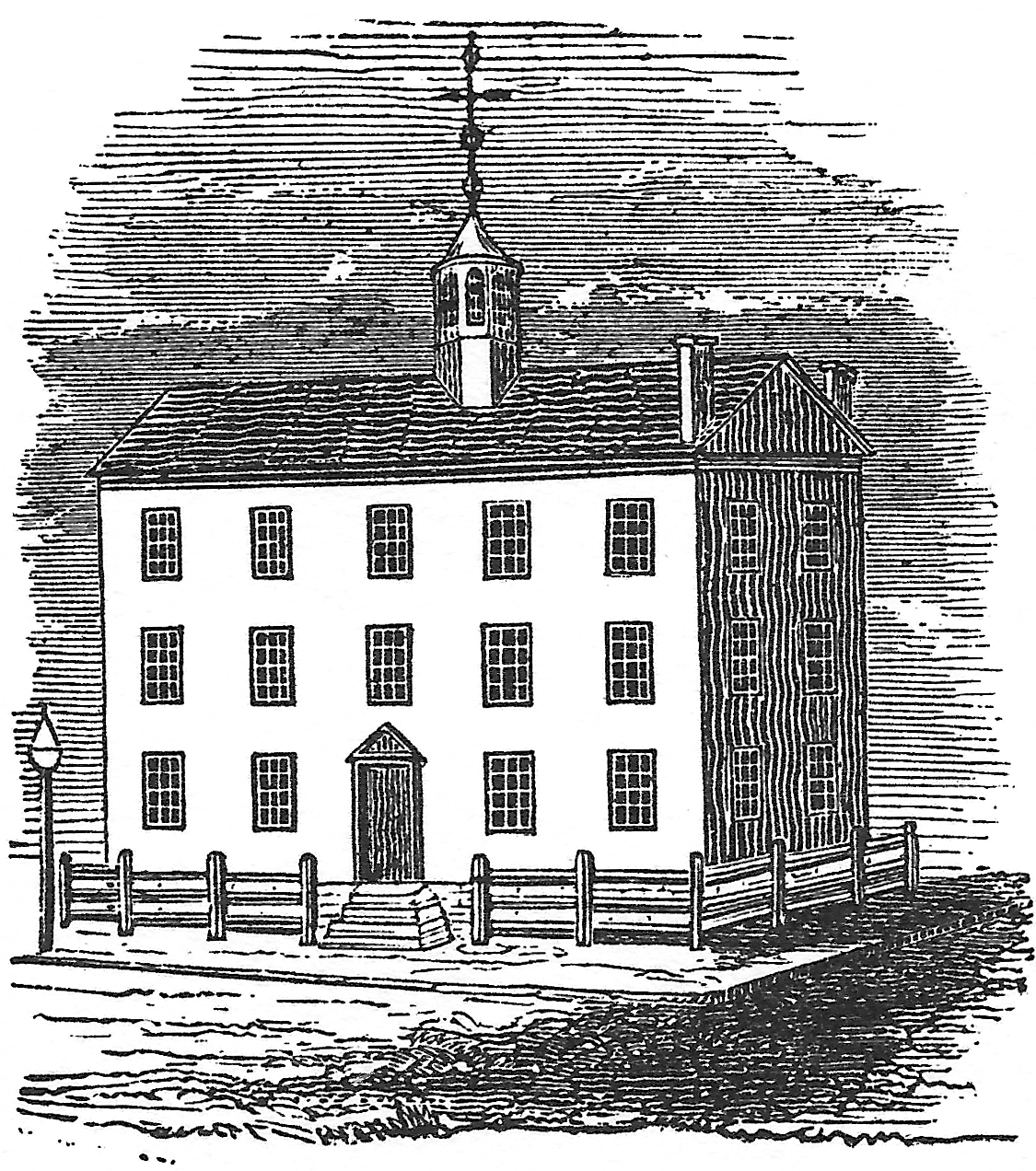
- The Old Albany City Hall (undated)

Overview
- Legislative body: New York State Legislature
- Jurisdiction: New York, United States
- Term: July 1, 1806 – June 30, 1807

Senate
- Members: 32
- President: Lt. Gov. John Broome (Clintonian)
- Party control: Clintonian

Assembly
- Members: 100
- Speaker: Andrew McCord (Lewisite)
- Party control: Lewisite-Federalist (53-42)

Sessions
- 1st: January 27 – April 7, 1807

The 30th New York State Legislature, consisting of the New York State Senate and the New York State Assembly, met from January 27 to April 7, 1807, during the third year of Morgan Lewis's governorship, in Albany.

== Background ==
Under the provisions of the New York Constitution of 1777, amended by the Constitutional Convention of 1801, 32 Senators were elected on general tickets in the four senatorial districts for four-year terms. They were divided into four classes, and every year eight Senate seats came up for election. Assemblymen were elected countywide on general tickets to a one-year term, the whole assembly being renewed annually.

In 1797, Albany was declared the State capital, and all subsequent Legislatures have been meeting there ever since. In 1799, the Legislature enacted that future Legislatures meet on the last Tuesday of January of each year unless called earlier by the governor.

State Senator Ebenezer Purdy resigned on March 16, 1806, to avoid being expelled for bribery, leaving a vacancy in the Southern District.

In 1806, three new counties were created: Allegany County was split from Genesee County, but remained with Genesee and Ontario County in one Assembly district. Broome County was split from Tioga County, but remained with Tioga in one Assembly district. Madison County was split from Chenango County, and was apportioned two seats in the Assembly, taken from Chenango.

At this time the politicians were divided into two opposing political parties: the Federalists and the Democratic-Republicans.

In 1805, the 28th Legislature had chartered the Merchant's Bank of New York which had been founded by Federalists in competition to the Democratic-Republican Bank of the Manhattan Company. The Democratic-Republican majority of the 27th Legislature had not only refused to grant a charter, but actually ordered the Merchant's Bank to shut down by May 1805. During the next session, the bank bribed enough legislators to have the charter approved, although the Democratic-Republican leaders advocated strongly against it. Gov. Morgan Lewis spoke out in favor of granting the charter what was resented by the party leaders DeWitt Clinton and Ambrose Spencer, and soon led to the split of the party into "Lewisites" and "Clintonians".

== Elections ==
The State election was held from April 29 to May 1, 1806. Senators James Burt (Middle D.) and Jacob Snell (Eastern D.) were re-elected. Jonathan Ward (Southern D.), Elisha Barlow (Middle D.), John Ballard, Salmon Buell, Jacob Gebhard and Nathan Smith (all four Western D.) were also elected to the Senate. Assemblyman Benjamin Coe (Southern D.) was elected to fill the vacancy. Burt, Barlow and Snell were Lewisites, the other six were Clintonians.

== Sessions ==
The Legislature met at the Old City Hall in Albany on January 27, 1807; and adjourned on April 7.

Lewisite Andrew McCord was elected Speaker with the help of the Federalists, with 53 votes against 40 for Clintonian Alexander Sheldon, the Speaker of the previous session. Lewisite Gerrit Y. Lansing was elected Clerk of the Assembly, defeating the Clintonian incumbent Solomon Southwick by a majority of 6 votes. On February 2, Southwick was elected Clerk of the Senate.

On February 3, 1807, the Legislature re-elected John Smith (Dem.-Rep.) to a full term in the U.S. Senate.

== State Senate ==
=== Districts ===
- The Southern District (6 seats) consisted of Kings, New York, Queens, Richmond, Suffolk and Westchester counties.
- The Middle District (8 seats) consisted of Dutchess, Orange, Ulster, Columbia, Delaware, Rockland and Greene counties.
- The Eastern District (9 seats) consisted of Washington, Clinton, Rensselaer, Albany, Saratoga, Essex and Montgomery counties.
- The Western District (9 seats) consisted of Herkimer, Ontario, Otsego, Tioga, Onondaga, Schoharie, Steuben, Chenango, Oneida, Cayuga, Genesee, Seneca, Jefferson, Lewis, St. Lawrence, Allegany, Broome and Madison counties.
Note: There are now 62 counties in the State of New York. The counties which are not mentioned in this list had not yet been established, or sufficiently organized, the area being included in one or more of the abovementioned counties.

=== Members ===
The asterisk (*) denotes members of the previous Legislature who continued in office as members of this Legislature. Benjamin Coe changed from the Assembly to the Senate.

District	Senators	Term left	Party	Notes
Southern	DeWitt Clinton*	1 year	Dem.-Rep./Clintonian	until February 1807, also Mayor of New York City
Southern	William Denning*	2 years	Dem.-Rep./Lewisite	
Southern	Benjamin Coe*	2 years	Dem.-Rep./Clintonian	elected to fill vacancy, in place of Ebenezer Purdy
Southern	Thomas Thomas*	2 years	Dem.-Rep./Lewisite	elected to the Council of Appointment
Southern	Ezra L'Hommedieu*	3 years	Dem.-Rep./Clintonian	
Southern	Jonathan Ward	4 years	Dem.-Rep./Clintonian	
Middle	Joshua H. Brett*	1 year	Dem.-Rep./Lewisite	
Middle	Robert Johnston*	1 year	Dem.-Rep./Clintonian	
Middle	Samuel Brewster*	2 years	Dem.-Rep.	
Middle	Stephen Hogeboom*	2 years	Dem.-Rep.	
Middle	Peter C. Adams*	3 years	Dem.-Rep./Clintonian	
Middle	James G. Graham*	3 years	Dem.-Rep./Lewisite	
Middle	Elisha Barlow	4 years	Dem.-Rep./Lewisite	
Middle	James Burt*	4 years	Dem.-Rep./Lewisite	elected to the Council of Appointment
Eastern	Edward Savage*	1 year	Dem.-Rep./Lewisite	elected to the Council of Appointment
Eastern	John Tayler*	1 year	Dem.-Rep.	
Eastern	Thomas Tredwell*	1 year	Dem.-Rep.	
Eastern	John Woodworth*	1 year	Dem.-Rep./Lewisite	also New York Attorney General
Eastern	Stephen Thorn*	2 years	Dem.-Rep./Clintonian	
Eastern	Adam Comstock*	3 years	Dem.-Rep./Clintonian	
Eastern	John Veeder*	3 years	Dem.-Rep./Clintonian	
Eastern	Joseph C. Yates*	3 years	Dem.-Rep./Clintonian	
Eastern	Jacob Snell*	4 years	Dem.-Rep./Lewisite	
Western	Caleb Hyde*	1 year	Dem.-Rep.	
Western	Henry Huntington*	2 years	Dem.-Rep./Clintonian	
Western	Jedediah Peck*	2 years	Dem.-Rep.	
Western	Nathaniel Locke*	3 years	Dem.-Rep.	
Western	John Nicholas*	3 years	Dem.-Rep./Lewisite	elected to the Council of Appointment
Western	John Ballard	4 years	Dem.-Rep./Clintonian	
Western	Salmon Buell	4 years	Dem.-Rep./Clintonian	
Western	Jacob Gebhard	4 years	Dem.-Rep./Clintonian	
Western	Nathan Smith	4 years	Dem.-Rep./Clintonian	

=== Employees ===
- Clerk: Henry I. Bleecker
  - Solomon Southwick, from February 2, 1807

== State Assembly ==
=== Districts ===
- Albany County (6 seats)
- Allegany, Genesee and Ontario counties (3 seats)
- Broome and Tioga counties (1 seat)
- Cayuga County (2 seats)
- Chenango County (2 seats)
- Clinton County (1 seat)
- Columbia County (4 seats)
- Delaware County (2 seats)
- Dutchess County (7 seats)
- Essex County (1 seat)
- Greene County (2 seats)
- Herkimer County (3 seats)
- Jefferson, Lewis and St. Lawrence counties (1 seat)
- Kings County (1 seat)
- Madison County (2 seats)
- Montgomery County (5 seats)
- The City and County of New York (9 seats)
- Oneida County (3 seats)
- Onondaga County (2 seats)
- Orange County (4 seats)
- Otsego County (4 seats)
- Queens County (3 seats)
- Rensselaer County (5 seats)
- Richmond County (1 seat)
- Rockland County (1 seat)
- Saratoga County (4 seats)
- Schoharie County (2 seats)
- Seneca County (1 seat)
- Steuben County (1 seat)
- Suffolk County (3 seats)
- Ulster County (4 seats)
- Washington County (6 seats)
- Westchester County (4 seats)
Note: There are now 62 counties in the State of New York. The counties which are not mentioned in this list had not yet been established, or sufficiently organized, the area being included in one or more of the abovementioned counties.

=== Assemblymen ===
The asterisk (*) denotes members of the previous Legislature who continued as members of this Legislature.

District	Assemblymen	Party	Notes
Albany	David Bogardus	Federalist	
Albany	Asa Colvard*	Federalist	
Albany	Johann Jost Dietz	Federalist	
Albany	Daniel Hale	Federalist	
Albany	Joseph Shurtleff*	Federalist	
Albany	Jacob Veeder	Federalist	
Allegany, Genesee and Ontario	Alexander Rea*	Dem.-Rep./Clintonian	
Allegany, Genesee and Ontario	Philetus Swift	Dem.-Rep./Clintonian	
Allegany, Genesee and Ontario	Asahel Warner	Dem.-Rep./Clintonian	
Broome and Tioga	John Miller*	Dem.-Rep./Lewisite	
Cayuga	John Grover Jr.*	Dem.-Rep./Lewisite	
Cayuga	Amos Rathbun*	Dem.-Rep./Lewisite	
Chenango	Obadiah German	Dem.-Rep./Clintonian	
Chenango	Joseph Simonds	Dem.-Rep./Clintonian	
Clinton	Nathaniel Z. Platt	Dem.-Rep./Lewisite	
Columbia	Elisha Gilbert Jr.	Federalist	
Columbia	Peter Sharp	Federalist	
Columbia	Gainus Stebbins	Federalist	
Columbia	Anson Pratt	Federalist	
Delaware	John T. More	Federalist	
Delaware	Joshua Pine	Dem.-Rep.	
Dutchess	John Haight	Dem.-Rep./Lewisite	
Dutchess	Aaron Hazen	Dem.-Rep./Lewisite	
Dutchess	Theron Rudd	Dem.-Rep./Lewisite	
Dutchess	John Storm	Dem.-Rep./Lewisite	
Dutchess	Tobias L. Stoutenburgh	Dem.-Rep./Lewisite	
Dutchess	Martin E. Winchell	Dem.-Rep./Lewisite	
Dutchess	Veniah Woolley*	Dem.-Rep./Lewisite	
Essex	Stephen Cuyler*	Dem.-Rep./Lewisite	
Greene	Samuel Haight	Dem.-Rep./Lewisite	
Greene	James Thompson*	Federalist	
Herkimer	John Kennedy	Dem.-Rep./Lewisite	
Herkimer	George Widrig*	Dem.-Rep./Lewisite	
Herkimer	Samuel Wright*	Dem.-Rep./Lewisite	
Jefferson, Lewis and St. Lawrence	Moss Kent	Federalist	
Kings	John Hicks*	Dem.-Rep./Clintonian	
Madison	Erastus Cleaveland	Dem.-Rep./Clintonian	
Madison	Sylvanus Smalley*	Dem.-Rep./Clintonian	previously a member from Chenango Co.
Montgomery	Lawrence Gros	Dem.-Rep.	
Montgomery	James Lansing		
Montgomery	Alexander Sheldon*	Dem.-Rep./Clintonian	
Montgomery	William Van Olinda		
Montgomery	Harmanus A. Vedder		
New York	John Bingham	Dem.-Rep./Clintonian	
New York	Francis Cooper*	Dem.-Rep./Clintonian	
New York	Clarkson Crolius*	Dem.-Rep./Clintonian	
New York	Benjamin Ferris*	Dem.-Rep./Clintonian	
New York	William W. Gilbert*	Dem.-Rep./Clintonian	
New York	Henry Rutgers	Dem.-Rep./Clintonian	
New York	Samuel Russell*	Dem.-Rep./Clintonian	
New York	Arthur Smith*	Dem.-Rep./Clintonian	
New York	James Warner*	Dem.-Rep./Clintonian	
Oneida	George Brayton*	Dem.-Rep.	
Oneida	Uri Doolittle	Dem.-Rep.	
Oneida	Charles Z. Platt	Dem.-Rep.	
Onondaga	Ozias Burr	Dem.-Rep./Clintonian	
Onondaga	Squire Manro	Dem.-Rep./Clintonian	
Orange	William Crist*	Dem.-Rep./Lewisite	
Orange	Andrew McCord*	Dem.-Rep./Lewisite	elected Speaker
Orange	Abraham Shultz	Dem.-Rep./Lewisite	
Orange	John Wood*	Dem.-Rep./Lewisite	
Otsego	Thomas Brooks	Dem.-Rep./Clintonian	
Otsego	Gurdon Huntington*	Dem.-Rep./Clintonian	
Otsego	Robert Roseboom	Dem.-Rep./Clintonian	
Otsego	Henry Scott	Dem.-Rep./Clintonian	
Queens	Stephen Carman	Federalist	
Queens	William Mott	Dem.-Rep./Clintonian	
Queens	John W. Seaman*	Dem.-Rep./Clintonian	
Rensselaer	Gilbert Eddy	Dem.-Rep.	
Rensselaer	Asa Mann	Dem.-Rep.	
Rensselaer	William W. Reynolds*	Dem.-Rep.	
Rensselaer	Robert Woodworth	Dem.-Rep.	
Rensselaer	Adam Yates	Dem.-Rep.	
Richmond	David Mersereau	Dem.-Rep./Lewisite	
Rockland	Samuel G. Verbryck	Dem.-Rep./Clintonian	
Saratoga	Chauncey Belding	Dem.-Rep.	
Saratoga	Gideon Goodrich	Dem.-Rep.	
Saratoga	Jesse Mott*	Dem.-Rep.	
Saratoga	David Rogers	Dem.-Rep.	
Schoharie	Henry Shafer	Dem.-Rep./Lewisite	
Schoharie	Peter Swart Jr.	Dem.-Rep./Lewisite	
Seneca	Cornelius Humfrey*	Dem.-Rep./Lewisite	
Steuben	John Wilson*	Dem.-Rep./Lewisite	
Suffolk	Israel Carll*	Dem.-Rep./Clintonian	
Suffolk	David Hedges*	Dem.-Rep./Clintonian	
Suffolk	David Warner	Dem.-Rep./Clintonian	
Ulster	John Conklin	Dem.-Rep./Lewisite	
Ulster	Jacob Marius Groeen	Dem.-Rep./Lewisite	
Ulster	Jacob Rea	Dem.-Rep./Lewisite	
Ulster	Peter P. Roosa*	Dem.-Rep./Lewisite	
Washington	Kitchel Bishop*	Dem.-Rep./Clintonian	
Washington	Peleg Bragg	Dem.-Rep.	
Washington	John Gray	Dem.-Rep.	
Washington	James Hill	Dem.-Rep./Clintonian	
Washington	Jason Kellogg	Dem.-Rep.	
Washington	William Robards	Dem.-Rep.	
Westchester	William Barker	Federalist	
Westchester	Benjamin Isaacs	Federalist	
Westchester	Samuel Marvin	Dem.-Rep./Clintonian	
Westchester	Abraham Odell	Dem.-Rep./Lewisite	

=== Employees ===
- Clerk: Gerrit Y. Lansing
- Sergeant-at-Arms: Thomas Donnelly
- Doorkeeper: Benjamin Whipple

== Sources ==
- The New York Civil List compiled by Franklin Benjamin Hough (Weed, Parsons and Co., 1858) [see pg. 108f for Senate districts; pg. 119f for senators; pg. 148f for Assembly districts; pg. 180 for assemblymen]
- The History of Political Parties in the State of New-York, from the Ratification of the Federal Constitution to December, 1840 by Jabez D. Hammond (4th ed., Vol. 1, H. & E. Phinney, Cooperstown, 1846; pages 235–245)
- Election result Assembly, Albany Co. at project "A New Nation Votes", compiled by Phil Lampi, hosted by Tufts University Digital Library
- Partial election result Assembly, Allegany, Genesee and Ontario Co. at project "A New Nation Votes" [gives only votes from the Town of Angelica]
- Partial election result Assembly, Broome and Tioga Co. at project "A New Nation Votes" [gives only votes from Tioga Co.]
- Election result Assembly, Delaware Co. at project "A New Nation Votes"
- Election result Assembly, Dutchess Co. at project "A New Nation Votes"
- Election result Assembly, Greene Co. at project "A New Nation Votes"
- Election result Assembly, Jefferson, Lewis and St. Lawrence Co. at project "A New Nation Votes" [omits votes from St. Lawrence Co.]
- Election result Assembly, Kings Co. at project "A New Nation Votes"
- Election result Assembly, Madison Co. at project "A New Nation Votes"
- Election result Assembly, Orange Co. at project "A New Nation Votes"
- Election result Assembly, Queens Co. at project "A New Nation Votes"
- Election result Assembly, Richmond Co. at project "A New Nation Votes"
- Election result Assembly, Rockland Co. at project "A New Nation Votes"
- Election result Assembly, Suffolk Co. at project "A New Nation Votes"
- Election result Assembly, Westchester Co. at project "A New Nation Votes"
- Partial election result Senate, Southern D. at project "A New Nation Votes" [omits votes from New York City]
- Partial election result Senate, Middle D. at project "A New Nation Votes" [omits votes from Columbia and Ulster counties]
- Partial election result Senate, Western D. at project "A New Nation Votes" [gives only votes from Allegany and Madison counties]
- Election result, Speaker at project "A New Nation Votes"
- Election result, Council of Appointment at project "A New Nation Votes"
