= 29th New York State Legislature =

New York state legislative session

| ← | 28th | 30th | → |
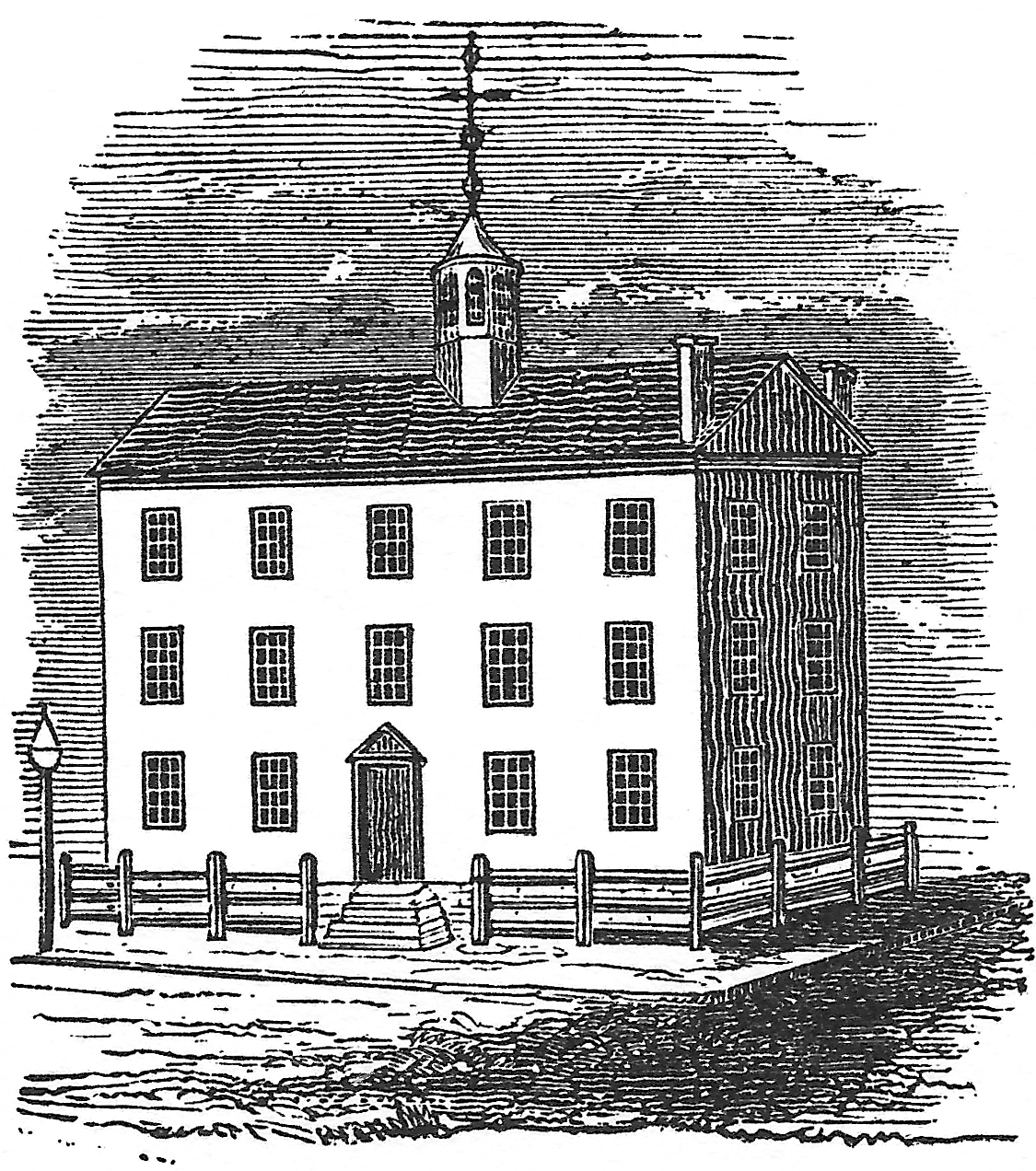
- The Old Albany City Hall (undated)

Overview
- Legislative body: New York State Legislature
- Jurisdiction: New York, United States
- Term: July 1, 1805 – June 30, 1806

Senate
- Members: 32
- President: Lt. Gov. John Broome (Dem.-Rep.)
- Party control: Democratic-Republican (30-0)

Assembly
- Members: 100
- Speaker: Alexander Sheldon (Dem.-Rep.)
- Party control: Democratic-Republican

Sessions
- 1st: January 28 – April 7, 1806

The 29th New York State Legislature, consisting of the New York State Senate and the New York State Assembly, met from January 28 to April 7, 1806, during the second year of Morgan Lewis's governorship, in Albany.

== Background ==
Under the provisions of the New York Constitution of 1777, amended by the Constitutional Convention of 1801, 32 Senators were elected on general tickets in the four senatorial districts for four-year terms. They were divided into four classes, and every year eight Senate seats came up for election. Assemblymen were elected countywide on general tickets to a one-year term, the whole assembly being renewed annually.

In 1797, Albany was declared the State capital, and all subsequent Legislatures have been meeting there ever since. In 1799, the Legislature enacted that future Legislatures meet on the last Tuesday of January of each year unless called earlier by the governor.

State Senator John Broome had been elected lieutenant governor, leaving a vacancy in the Southern District.

In 1805, Jefferson and Lewis counties were split from Oneida County. In 1802, St. Lawrence had been formed from parts of Clinton, Herkimer and Montgomery counties, but had not been sufficiently organized to hold separate elections. Now these three counties were joined in one Assembly district which was apportioned one seat, taken from Oneida.

At this time the politicians were divided into two opposing political parties: the Federalists and the Democratic-Republicans.

In 1805, the 28th Legislature had chartered the Merchant's Bank of New York which had been founded by Federalists in competition to the Democratic-Republican Bank of the Manhattan Company. The Democratic-Republican majority of the 27th Legislature had not only refused to grant a charter, but actually ordered the Merchant's Bank to shut down by May 1805. During the next session, the bank bribed enough legislators to have the charter approved, although the Democratic-Republican leaders advocated strongly against it. Gov. Morgan Lewis spoke out in favor of granting the charter what was resented by the party leaders DeWitt Clinton and Ambrose Spencer, and soon led to the split of the party into "Lewisites" and "Clintonians".

== Elections ==
The State election was held from April 30 to May 2, 1805. Senator Ezra L'Hommedieu (Southern D.) was re-elected. Peter C. Adams, James G. Graham (both Middle D.), Adam Comstock, John Veeder, Joseph C. Yates (all three Eastern D.), Nathaniel Locke and John Nicholas (both Western D.) were also elected to full terms in the Senate. DeWitt Clinton (Southern D.) was elected to fill the vacancy. All nine were Democratic-Republicans.

== Sessions ==
The Legislature met at the Old City Hall in Albany on January 28, 1806; and adjourned on April 7.

Clintonian Alexander Sheldon was re-elected Speaker.

On March 15, 1806, DeWitt Clinton offered a resolution in the Senate for the expulsion of Ebenezer Purdy for the reason that he had been bribed and that he had attempted to bribe Stephen Thorn and Obadiah German during the controversial chartering of the Merchant's Bank of New York during the previous session. Purdy resigned his seat on the next day, before the Senate could take a vote on the issue.

== State Senate ==
=== Districts ===
- The Southern District (6 seats) consisted of Kings, New York, Queens, Richmond, Suffolk and Westchester counties.
- The Middle District (8 seats) consisted of Dutchess, Orange, Ulster, Columbia, Delaware, Rockland and Greene counties.
- The Eastern District (9 seats) consisted of Washington, Clinton, Rensselaer, Albany, Saratoga, Essex and Montgomery counties.
- The Western District (9 seats) consisted of Herkimer, Ontario, Otsego, Tioga, Onondaga, Schoharie, Steuben, Chenango, Oneida, Cayuga, Genesee, Seneca, Jefferson, Lewis and St. Lawrence counties.
Note: There are now 62 counties in the State of New York. The counties which are not mentioned in this list had not yet been established, or sufficiently organized, the area being included in one or more of the abovementioned counties.

=== Members ===
The asterisk (*) denotes members of the previous Legislature who continued in office as members of this Legislature.

| District | Senators | Term left | Party | Notes |
|---|---|---|---|---|
| Southern | John Schenck* | 1 year | Dem.-Rep. | |
| Southern | DeWitt Clinton | 2 years | Dem.-Rep. | elected to fill vacancy, in place of John Broome; elected to the Council of Appointment; also Mayor of New York City |
| Southern | William Denning* | 3 years | Dem.-Rep. | |
| Southern | Ebenezer Purdy* | 3 years | Dem.-Rep. | resigned on March 16, 1806, to avoid expulsion for bribery |
| Southern | Thomas Thomas* | 3 years | Dem.-Rep. | |
| Southern | Ezra L'Hommedieu* | 4 years | Dem.-Rep. | |
| Middle | Abraham Adriance* | 1 year | Dem.-Rep. | |
| Middle | James Burt* | 1 year | Dem.-Rep. | |
| Middle | Joshua H. Brett* | 2 years | Dem.-Rep. | |
| Middle | Robert Johnston* | 2 years | Dem.-Rep. | elected to the Council of Appointment |
| Middle | Samuel Brewster* | 3 years | Dem.-Rep. | |
| Middle | Stephen Hogeboom* | 3 years | Dem.-Rep. | |
| Middle | Peter C. Adams | 4 years | Dem.-Rep. | |
| Middle | James G. Graham | 4 years | Dem.-Rep. | |
| Eastern | (Jacob Snell*) | 1 year | Dem.-Rep. | did not attend |
| Eastern | Edward Savage* | 2 years | Dem.-Rep. | |
| Eastern | John Tayler* | 2 years | Dem.-Rep. | |
| Eastern | Thomas Tredwell* | 2 years | Dem.-Rep. | |
| Eastern | John Woodworth* | 2 years | Dem.-Rep. | also New York Attorney General |
| Eastern | Stephen Thorn* | 3 years | Dem.-Rep. | |
| Eastern | Adam Comstock | 4 years | Dem.-Rep. | elected to the Council of Appointment |
| Eastern | John Veeder | 4 years | Dem.-Rep. | |
| Eastern | Joseph C. Yates | 4 years | Dem.-Rep. | |
| Western | Joseph Annin* | 1 year | Dem.-Rep. | |
| Western | Asa Danforth* | 1 year | Dem.-Rep. | |
| Western | vacant | 1 year | | Matthias B. Tallmadge was appointed to the United States District Court for the District of New York |
| Western | George Tiffany* | 1 year | Dem.-Rep. | |
| Western | Caleb Hyde* | 2 years | Dem.-Rep. | |
| Western | Henry Huntington* | 3 years | Dem.-Rep. | elected to the Council of Appointment |
| Western | Jedediah Peck* | 3 years | Dem.-Rep. | |
| Western | Nathaniel Locke | 4 years | Dem.-Rep. | |
| Western | John Nicholas | 4 years | Dem.-Rep. | |

=== Employees ===
- Clerk: Henry I. Bleecker

== State Assembly ==
=== Districts ===
- Albany County (6 seats)
- Cayuga County (2 seats)
- Chenango County (4 seats)
- Clinton County (1 seat)
- Columbia County (4 seats)
- Delaware County (2 seats)
- Dutchess County (7 seats)
- Essex County (1 seat)
- Genesee and Ontario counties (3 seats)
- Greene County (2 seats)
- Herkimer County (3 seats)
- Jefferson, Lewis and St. Lawrence counties (1 seat)
- Kings County (1 seat)
- Montgomery County (5 seats)
- The City and County of New York (9 seats)
- Oneida County (3 seats)
- Onondaga County (2 seats)
- Orange County (4 seats)
- Otsego County (4 seats)
- Queens County (3 seats)
- Rensselaer County (5 seats)
- Richmond County (1 seat)
- Rockland County (1 seat)
- Saratoga County (4 seats)
- Schoharie County (2 seats)
- Seneca County (1 seat)
- Steuben County (1 seat)
- Suffolk County (3 seats)
- Tioga County (1 seat)
- Ulster County (4 seats)
- Washington County (6 seats)
- Westchester County (4 seats)
Note: There are now 62 counties in the State of New York. The counties which are not mentioned in this list had not yet been established, or sufficiently organized, the area being included in one or more of the abovementioned counties.

=== Assemblymen ===
The asterisk (*) denotes members of the previous Legislature who continued as members of this Legislature. Abraham Van Vechten changed from the Senate to the Assembly.

| District | Assemblymen | Party | Notes |
|---|---|---|---|
| Albany | David Burhans* | Federalist | |
| Albany | Asa Colvard | Federalist | |
| Albany | Adam Dietz Jr.* | Federalist | |
| Albany | Stephen Lush* | Federalist | |
| Albany | Joseph Shurtleff* | Federalist | |
| Albany | Abraham Van Vechten* | Federalist | |
| Cayuga | John Grover Jr.* | Dem.-Rep. | |
| Cayuga | Amos Rathbun* | Dem.-Rep. | unsuccessfully contested by Salmon Buell |
| Chenango | Benjamin Jones | | |
| Chenango | Jonathan Morgan | | |
| Chenango | Samuel Payne* | | |
| Chenango | Sylvanus Smalley | Dem.-Rep. | |
| Clinton | William Bailey | | |
| Columbia | Moncrief Livingston* | Federalist | |
| Columbia | Peter Silvester* | Federalist | |
| Columbia | William W. Van Ness* | Federalist | |
| Columbia | Jason Warner* | Federalist | |
| Delaware | Anthony Marvine* | Federalist | |
| Delaware | Gabriel North | Dem.-Rep. | |
| Dutchess | Barnabas Carver | Dem.-Rep. | |
| Dutchess | Joseph C. Field | Dem.-Rep. | |
| Dutchess | Benjamin Herrick | Dem.-Rep. | |
| Dutchess | Abraham H. Schenck* | Dem.-Rep. | |
| Dutchess | John Van Benthuysen* | Dem.-Rep. | |
| Dutchess | William D. Williams | Dem.-Rep. | |
| Dutchess | Veniah Woolley | Dem.-Rep. | |
| Essex | Theodorus Ross* | Dem.-Rep. | |
| Genesee and Ontario | Daniel W. Lewis* | Federalist | |
| Genesee and Ontario | Ezra Patterson | | |
| Genesee and Ontario | Alexander Rea* | Dem.-Rep. | |
| Greene | John Ely | | |
| Greene | James Thompson | Federalist | |
| Herkimer | Eldad Corbet | Dem.-Rep. | |
| Herkimer | George Widrig* | Dem.-Rep. | |
| Herkimer | Samuel Wright* | Dem.-Rep. | |
| Jefferson, Lewis and St. Lawrence | Henry Coffeen | | |
| Kings | John Hicks* | Dem.-Rep. | |
| Montgomery | John Herkimer | Dem.-Rep./Clintonian | |
| Montgomery | Samuel Jackson | Dem.-Rep./Clintonian | |
| Montgomery | James McIntyre* | Dem.-Rep./Clintonian | |
| Montgomery | Alexander Sheldon* | Dem.-Rep./Clintonian | re-elected Speaker |
| Montgomery | Joseph Waggoner | Dem.-Rep./Clintonian | |
| New York | Francis Cooper | Dem.-Rep. | |
| New York | Clarkson Crolius | Dem.-Rep. | |
| New York | Benjamin Ferris | Dem.-Rep. | |
| New York | William W. Gilbert* | Dem.-Rep. | |
| New York | Richard Riker | Dem.-Rep. | also District Attorney of the First District |
| New York | Samuel Russell | Dem.-Rep. | |
| New York | Peter A. Schenck* | | |
| New York | Arthur Smith | Dem.-Rep. | |
| New York | James Warner | Dem.-Rep. | |
| Oneida | George Brayton* | Dem.-Rep. | |
| Oneida | Thomas Hart | | |
| Oneida | Joseph Jennings* | | |
| Onondaga | Jasper Hopper | Dem.-Rep. | |
| Onondaga | William I. Vredenbergh* | Dem.-Rep. | |
| Orange | William Crist | Dem.-Rep. | |
| Orange | David Dill | Dem.-Rep. | |
| Orange | Andrew McCord | Dem.-Rep./Lewisite | |
| Orange | John Wood | Dem.-Rep. | |
| Otsego | Daniel Hawks | | |
| Otsego | Gurdon Huntington* | Dem.-Rep. | |
| Otsego | Luther Rich | Dem.-Rep. | |
| Otsego | Rufus Steere | | |
| Queens | Benjamin Coe* | Dem.-Rep. | |
| Queens | Henry O. Seaman* | Dem.-Rep. | |
| Queens | John W. Seaman | Dem.-Rep. | |
| Rensselaer | Jonathan Niles | | |
| Rensselaer | William W. Reynolds | Dem.-Rep. | |
| Rensselaer | John Ryan* | Dem.-Rep. | |
| Rensselaer | Nicholas Staats | Dem.-Rep. | |
| Rensselaer | Jacob Yates | Dem.-Rep. | |
| Richmond | John Dunn* | Federalist | |
| Rockland | John Haring | Dem.-Rep. | |
| Saratoga | John Cramer | | |
| Saratoga | John McClelland | | |
| Saratoga | Jesse Mott | Dem.-Rep. | |
| Saratoga | Asahel Porter* | Federalist | |
| Schoharie | Henry Bellinger | | |
| Schoharie | Henry Shafer | Dem.-Rep. | |
| Seneca | Cornelius Humfrey | Dem.-Rep. | |
| Steuben | John Wilson* | Dem.-Rep. | |
| Suffolk | Israel Carll* | Dem.-Rep. | |
| Suffolk | David Hedges | Dem.-Rep. | |
| Suffolk | Jared Landon* | Dem.-Rep. | |
| Tioga | John Miller* | Dem.-Rep. | |
| Ulster | Josiah Hasbrouck | Dem.-Rep. | |
| Ulster | John Lounsbery | Dem.-Rep. | |
| Ulster | Peter P. Roosa | Dem.-Rep. | |
| Ulster | Elnathan Sears | Dem.-Rep. | |
| Washington | Kitchel Bishop | | |
| Washington | William Livingston* | | |
| Washington | John McLean* | Dem.-Rep. | |
| Washington | Nathaniel Pitcher | Dem.-Rep. | |
| Washington | Daniel Shepherd | | |
| Washington | vacant | | |
| Westchester | Joel Frost | Dem.-Rep. | |
| Westchester | Philip Honeywell | | |
| Westchester | Ezra Lockwood | | |
| Westchester | Caleb Tompkins* | Dem.-Rep. | |

=== Employees ===
- Clerk: Solomon Southwick
- Sergeant-at-Arms: Thomas Donnelly
- Doorkeeper: Benjamin Whipple

== Sources ==
- The New York Civil List compiled by Franklin Benjamin Hough (Weed, Parsons and Co., 1858) [see pg. 108f for Senate districts; pg. 119 for senators; pg. 148f for Assembly districts; pg. 179 for assemblymen]
- The History of Political Parties in the State of New-York, from the Ratification of the Federal Constitution to December, 1840 by Jabez D. Hammond (4th ed., Vol. 1, H. & E. Phinney, Cooperstown, 1846; pages 222–234)
- Election result Assembly, Albany Co. at project "A New Nation Votes", compiled by Phil Lampi, hosted by Tufts University Digital Library
- Election result Assembly, Columbia Co. at project "A New Nation Votes"
- Election result Assembly, Dutchess Co. at project "A New Nation Votes"
- Partial election result Assembly, Genesee and Ontario Co. at project "A New Nation Votes" [gives only votes from the Town of Angelica]
- Election result Assembly, Greene Co. at project "A New Nation Votes"
- Election result Assembly, Herkimer Co. at project "A New Nation Votes"
- Election result Assembly, Montgomery Co. at project "A New Nation Votes" [erroneously sorted among the results of 1806, but transcription manuscript states correctly 1805; Montgomery Co. had already at this early time two opposing Dem.-Rep. tickets]
- Election result Assembly, Orange Co. at project "A New Nation Votes"
- Election result Assembly, Queens Co. at project "A New Nation Votes"
- Election result Assembly, Rensselaer Co. at project "A New Nation Votes"
- Election result Assembly, Schoharie Co. at project "A New Nation Votes"
- Election result Assembly, Ulster Co. at project "A New Nation Votes"
- Election result Assembly, Westchester Co. at project "A New Nation Votes"
- Partial election result Senate, Middle D. at project "A New Nation Votes" [gives only votes from Dutchess and Greene counties]
- Partial election result Senate, Eastern D. at project "A New Nation Votes" [gives only votes from Albany, Montgomery, Rensselaer and Saratoga counties]
