= Gouverneur Morris (disambiguation) =

Gouverneur Morris (1752–1816), was a Founding Father of the United States and Senator from New York.

Gouverneur Morris may also refer to:

- Gouverneur Morris Jr. (1813–1888), American railroad executive
- Gouverneur Morris (novelist) (1876–1953), American pulp novelist
- SS Gouverneur Morris, a World War II American ship
