= Thomas B. Cooke =

American politician (1778–1853)

Member of the U.S. House of Representatives from New York's 5th district
- In office March 4, 1811 – March 4, 1813
- Preceded by: Barent Gardenier
- Succeeded by: Thomas P. Grosvenor

Member of the New York State Assembly
- In office 1838–1839

Personal details
- Born: November 21, 1778 Wallingford, Connecticut
- Died: November 20, 1853 (aged 74) Catskill, New York
- Party: Democratic-Republican

Thomas Burrage Cooke (November 21, 1778 – November 20, 1853) was a United States representative from New York.

== Biography ==
Born in Wallingford, Connecticut, he moved to New York about 1802 and settled in Catskill. He engaged in mercantile pursuits; and was elected as a Democratic-Republican to the Twelfth Congress, holding office from March 4, 1811 to March 4, 1813. He was elected president of what is now the Catskill National Bank in 1813 and took the oath of office as justice of the peace on September 2, 1818. He engaged in the water freighting business in 1823 and was also interested in agricultural pursuits. He became one of the incorporators of the Catskill & Canajoharie Railway on April 19, 1830 and was a member of the New York State Assembly in 1838 and 1839. He died in Catskill in 1853; and was interred in Catskill Village Cemetery.

U.S. House of Representatives
Preceded by Barent Gardenier	Member of the U.S. House of Representatives from New York's 5th congressional district 1811–1813	Succeeded by Thomas P. Grosvenor
