= Peter Silvester (1734–1808) =

American politician (1734–1808)

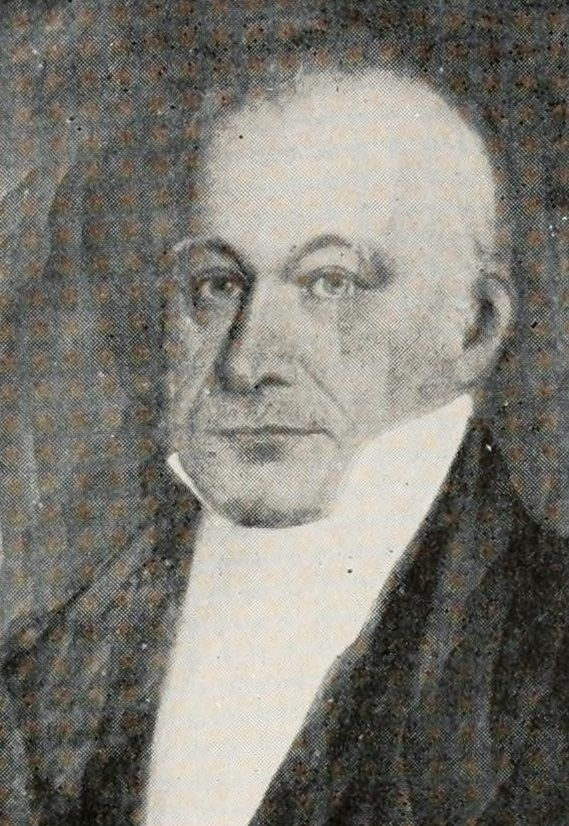

Member of the New York State Assembly from Columbia County
- In office July 1, 1802 – June 30, 1806
- Preceded by: District Created
- Succeeded by: John Kortz

Member of the New York Senate from the Middle District district
- In office July 1, 1796 – June 30, 1800

Member of the U.S. House of Representatives from New York's 5th district
- In office March 4, 1789 – March 3, 1793
- Preceded by: District Created
- Succeeded by: Theodorus Bailey

Member of the New York State Assembly from Columbia County
- In office July 1, 1787 – June 30, 1788
- Preceded by: District Created
- Succeeded by: John Kortz

Personal details
- Born: 1734 Shelter Island, Province of New York, British America
- Died: October 15, 1808 (aged 73–74) Kinderhook, New York, U.S.
- Party: Federalist
- Spouse: Jane Van Schaack
- Children: Francis Silvester
- Profession: Lawyer, Politician

Military service
- Allegiance: United States
- Battles/wars: Revolutionary War

Peter Silvester (1734 – October 15, 1808) was an American politician who was a member of the United States House of Representatives from New York, and a prominent Federalist attorney in Kinderhook. He was a mentor to Martin Van Buren, the 8th president of the United States and was the grandfather of New York representative Peter Henry Silvester.

== Early life ==
Peter Silvester was born in 1734 at Shelter Island in the Province of New York (just off the eastern coast of Long Island). Silvester was probably descended from Nathaniel Sylvester (1610-1680), an English sugar merchant and the first European settler of Shelter Island.

Silvester completed preparatory studies, studied law, was admitted to the bar in 1763, and practiced in Albany, New York. He owned slaves.

== Career ==
=== Legal practice ===
In 1763, he began employment as the attorney for Sir William Johnson (1715–1774) in Albany. Johnson had commanded the Iroquois and New York colonial militia forces during the French and Indian War, the North American theatre of the Seven Years' War (1754–1763) in Europe. His role in the British victory at the Battle of Lake George in 1755 earned him a baronetcy and his capture of Fort Niagara from the French in 1759 brought him additional renown. Johnson served as the British Superintendent of Indian Affairs for the northern district from 1756 until his death in 1774, working to keep American Indians allied with the British. In letters to Johnson, Silvester wrote that he met with Witham Marsh concerning wrongs committed by Indians. Silvester was subsequently appointed "clerk of the peace."

In 1767, he moved to the Van Schaack estate in Kinderhook, and began his practice of law as the first attorney in Kinderhook. Among the students who began the study of law in his office were: Peter van Schaack (1747-1832); Francis Silvester (1767-1845), his son; and Martin Van Buren (1782–1862), who later became the 8th President of the United States.

Van Buren began his legal training with Silvester and his son Francis in 1796, before Van Buren had reached the age of 14. When Van Buren first began his legal studies, he often presented an unkempt appearance in rough, homespun clothing. It was the Silvesters who suggested that Van Buren could improve his professional prospects by dressing fashionably and taking care in how he appeared in public; he heeded the advice and patterned his clothing, appearance, bearing and conduct after theirs. After six years under the Silvesters, the elder Silvester and Democratic-Republican political figure John Peter Van Ness suggested that Van Buren's political leanings made it a good idea for him to complete his education with a Democratic-Republican attorney. Van Buren accepted their advice and spent a final year of apprenticeship in the New York City office of John Van Ness's brother William P. Van Ness, a political lieutenant of Aaron Burr.

=== Revolutionary War ===
During the American Revolutionary War (1775–1783), Silvester backed the patriot cause and held a variety of positions in New York including: member of the Albany Common Council in 1772, member of the Committee of Safety in 1774, and a member of the First and Second Provincial Congresses in 1775 and 1776.

His wife's family, the Van Schaacks, were Loyalists, and some historians have suggested that Silvester's in-laws may have influenced him to take a reduced role as the Revolution progressed.

=== Government service ===
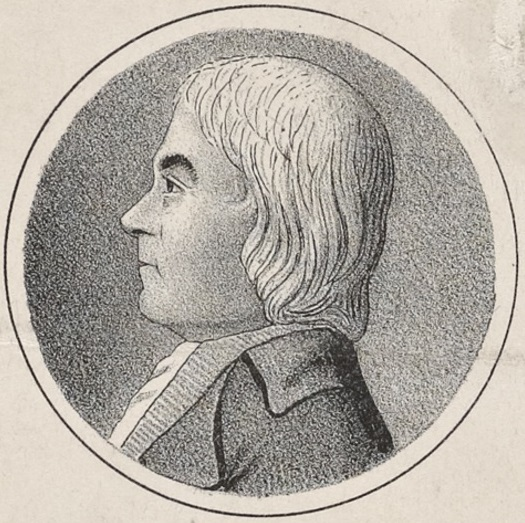
Silvester as a New York State Senator in 1798.

He was appointed judge of the court of common pleas of Columbia County, New York in 1786, and served until 1789. He was a regent of the University of the State of New York from 1787 to 1808.

From July 1, 1787 to June 30, 1788, Silvester served in the 11th New York State Legislature as a member of the New York State Assembly from Columbia County, the first year that Columbia County was represented.

After serving in the New York State Assembly, Silvester was elected to the First and Second United States Congresses as a Pro-Administration (Federalist) candidate. He served in the United States Congress from March 4, 1789 to March 3, 1793.

After his time in Congress, Silvester was elected to a four-year term as a member of the New York State Senate, serving from 1796 to 1800 in the 20th, 21st, 22nd, and 23rd New York State Legislature. After his service in the Senate, he returned to serve again in the Assembly from 1803 (26th Legislature), and again in 1804 (28th Legislature), 1805 (29th Legislature) until June 30, 1806. He retired from public life after his last term in the Legislature.

== Personal life ==
Coat of Arms of Peter Silvester

On August 16, 1764, he married Jannetje "Jane" Van Schaack, daughter of Cornelius Van Schaack (1705-1776) and Lydia Van Dyck. Cornelius Van Schaack owned a large estate in Kinderhook, New York. Jane was the elder sister of Peter van Schaack, who married the daughter of Henry Cruger, a wealthy New York merchant. Together they had:

- Francis Silvester (July 22, 1767 - January 31, 1845), who married Lydia Van Vleck Van Schaack, a niece of Peter van Schaack and foster daughter of David Van Schaack
  - Peter Henry Silvester (1807–1882), who married Catherine Susan Bronk (?-1858)
    - Francis Silvester II (November 15, 1833 - December 6, 1903 in New York City), district attorney and member of the State Constitutional Convention of 1867
    - John L. B. Silvester
  - Margaret Silvester (1812-1903)

Silvester was a warden of St. Peters Church in Albany in 1773, and was listed as a vestryman in the Church's charter of incorporation, granted by King George III on April 25, 1769.

Silvester resided in Kinderhook, where he died on October 15, 1808, aged about 74 years. He was interred in the "Old Van Schaack Cemetery", over which the Kinderhook Reformed Dutch Church and Cemetery were built in 1814. The exact location of his grave is not known.

=== Memorials ===
The SS Peter Silvester, an American merchant marine ship built for the United States Maritime Commission in service from 1942 to 1945 was named for Peter Silvester.

== Bibliography ==
- Hamilton, Milton W. Sir William Johnson: Colonial American, 1715–1763. Port Washington, New York: Kennikat Press, 1976. ISBN 0-8046-9134-7. The first of what was intended to be a two-volume biography; Hamilton never completed the second.
- O'Toole, Fintan. White Savage: William Johnson and the Invention of America. New York: Farrar, Straus and Giroux, 2005. ISBN 0-374-28128-9.

U.S. House of Representatives
| New district | Member of the U.S. House of Representatives from New York's 5th congressional district 1789–1793 | Succeeded by Theodorus Bailey |
