= John Blake Jr. (politician) =

American lawyer and politician

Member of the U.S. House of Representatives from New York's 5th district
- In office March 4, 1805 – March 4, 1809
- Preceded by: Andrew McCord
- Succeeded by: Barent Gardenier

Member of the New York State Assembly
- In office 1812-1813; 1800; 1798-1799

Personal details
- Born: December 5, 1762 Ulster County, Province of New York, British America
- Died: January 13, 1826 (aged 63) Montgomery, New York, U.S.
- Party: Democratic-Republican
- Spouse: Elsie Eager Blake
- Children: 6
- Profession: sheriff; politician; judge

Military service
- Allegiance: United States of America
- Branch/service: New York State Militia
- Battles/wars: Revolutionary War

John Blake Jr. (December 5, 1762 – January 13, 1826) was an American slave owner, lawyer, and politician and a U. S. Representative from New York.

== Biography ==
Born in Ulster County in the Province of New York, Blake attended the public schools and during the Revolutionary War Blake served in the New York State Militia. He married Elsie Eager and they had six children.

== Career ==
Appointed deputy sheriff of Ulster County in 1793, Blake was then a member of the New York State Assembly in 22nd New York State Legislature from 1798 to 1799 and 23rd New York State Legislature in 1800. He was sheriff of Orange County from 1803 to 1805.

Elected as a Democratic-Republican to the 9th and 10th United States Congresses, Blake was United States Representative for the fifth district of New York from March 4, 1805, to March 4, 1809.

Blake was again a member of the State assembly in 36th New York State Legislature from 1812 to 1813. He served as judge of the Orange County Court of Common Pleas from 1815 to 1818. He was a presidential elector in 1816, voting for James Monroe and Daniel D. Tompkins.

Again serving in the State assembly in 1819, Blake was then supervisor of the town of Montgomery for fifteen terms.

== Death ==
Blake died in Montgomery, Orange County, New York. He is interred at Berea Churchyard, near Newburgh, New York.

U.S. House of Representatives
Preceded by Andrew McCord	Member of the U.S. House of Representatives from New York's 5th congressional district March 4, 1805 – March 4, 1809	Succeeded by Barent Gardenier
