= Andrew McCord =

American politician (1754–1808)

Member of the U.S. House of Representatives from New York's 5th congressional district
- In office March 4, 1803 – March 3, 1805
- Preceded by: Theodorus Bailey
- Succeeded by: John Blake, Jr.

Speaker of the New York State Assembly
- In office 1807
- Preceded by: Alexander Sheldon
- Succeeded by: Alexander Sheldon

Personal details
- Born: c. 1754 Stony Ford, New York
- Died: 1808 (aged 53–54) Stony Ford, New York
- Party: Democratic-Republican

Andrew McCord (c. 1754–1808) was a United States representative from New York. The name is often spelled MacCord, especially in newspapers of the time.

== Life ==
McCord was the son of John McCord who came in 1729 from Ireland to Cape Cod with Charles Clinton.

He was born in Stony Ford, Orange County, New York and attended the common schools and Newburgh Academy. He was a delegate to the convention at New Paltz on November 7, 1775, to choose deputies to the Second Provincial Congress, and was quartermaster in the Ulster County Militia from January 31, 1787, on. He served as captain of the Ulster County Militia and resigned on April 10, 1798.

In 1795, 1796, 1798, 1800, 1802, 1806 and 1807, he was a member of the New York State Assembly; and was speaker in 1807.

McCord was elected as a Democratic-Republican to the Eighth Congress, holding office from March 4, 1803, to March 3, 1805, after which he engaged in agricultural pursuits. He died at Stony Ford in 1808, and was buried in the family burying ground on his farm near Stony Ford.

U.S. House of Representatives
Preceded by Theodorus Bailey	Member of the U.S. House of Representatives from New York's 5th congressional district 1803–1805	Succeeded by John Blake, Jr.
Political offices
Preceded by Alexander Sheldon	Speaker of the New York State Assembly; 1807	Succeeded by Alexander Sheldon
