= 1803 United States Senate election in New York =

- February 1, 1803

Majority vote of legislature needed to win
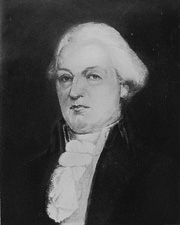

Nominee	Theodorus Bailey	John Woodworth
Party	Democratic-Republican	Democratic-Republican
Electoral vote	59	57
Percentage	50.86%	49.14%
Senator before election
Gouvernor Morris
Federalist
Elected Senator
Theodorus Bailey
Democratic-Republican

The 1803 United States Senate election in New York was held on February 1, 1803, by the New York State Legislature to elect a U.S. senator (Class 1) to represent the State of New York in the United States Senate.

== Background ==
Gouverneur Morris had been elected in 1800 to complete the term (1797–1803) after Philip Schuyler (1797–98), John Sloss Hobart (1798), William North (1798) and James Watson (1798–1800) had occupied the seat. Morris's term would expire on March 3, 1803.

At the State election in April 1802, the Democratic-Republican Party won a large majority to the Assembly, and all 8 State Senate seats up for renewal. The 26th New York State Legislature met from January 25 to April 6, 1803, at Albany, New York.

== Candidates ==
The assemblymen of the Democratic-Republican Party met in caucus on January 31. Assemblyman John Woodworth received 45 votes and Congressman Theodorus Bailey 30. Woodworth was nominated as the party's candidate, but State Senator Matthias B. Tallmadge, Bailey's brother-in law, was not satisfied with this nomination. Tallmadge persuaded a part of the Democratic-Republican members to vote for Bailey, abandoning the caucus nominee.

The incumbent Gouverneur Morris ran for re-election as the candidate of the Federalist Party candidate, but in the morning of February 1, before the legislature met, a State Senate caucus was held and Tallmadge combined with Abraham Van Vechten, the leader of the Federalists, to support Bailey.

== Result ==
On the first ballot in the State Senate, Woodworth received a plurality over Bailey and Morris, for whom all Federalists voted, but no candidate received a majority of the votes. Thereupon a resolution was offered to nominate Bailey, and was carried by the vote of 16 senators, including 6 Federalists. John Woodworth was nominated by the Assembly. The legislature then proceeded to a joint ballot, and Bailey was elected in a tight vote by the Democratic-Republican Tallmadge faction and the Federalists.

1803 United States Senator election result
Office	House	Democratic-Republican		Democratic-Republican		Federalist	
U.S. senator	State Senate (31 members) ballot	John Woodworth		Theodorus Bailey		Gouverneur Morris	
	State Senate (31 members) resolution			Theodorus Bailey	16		
	State Assembly (99 members)	John Woodworth	53	Theodorus Bailey	19	Gouverneur Morris	18
	Joint ballot (130 members)	John Woodworth	57	Theodorus Bailey	59		

== Aftermath ==
Bailey resigned on January 16, 1804, after his appointment as Postmaster of New York City. In February 1804, a special election was held by the State Legislature to fill both seats in the U.S. Senate and, either due to a mistake or to give Armstrong two more years to serve, the incumbent appointed Class 3 Senator John Armstrong was elected to the Class 1 seat (term 1803–1809) to succeed Bailey, and John Smith to the Class 3 seat (term 1801–1807) to succeed Armstrong.

== See also ==
- United States Senate elections, 1802 and 1803

== Sources ==
- The New York Civil List compiled in 1858 (see: pg. 63 for U.S. senators; pg. 118 for state senators 1802–03; page 176 for Members of Assembly 1802–03)
- Members of the 8th United States Congress
- History of Political Parties in the State of New-York by Jabez Delano Hammond (pages 191ff) [has "18" votes for Morris in Assembly]
- Election result at Tufts University Library project "A New Nation Votes" [has "16" votes for Morris in Assembly]
