= Theodorus Bailey (politician) =

American politician

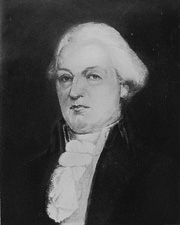

United States Senator from New York
- In office March 4, 1803 – January 16, 1804
- Preceded by: Gouverneur Morris
- Succeeded by: John Armstrong, Jr.

Member of the U.S. House of Representatives from New York's 5th district
- In office December 7, 1801 – March 3, 1803
- Preceded by: Thomas Tillotson
- Succeeded by: Andrew McCord
- In office March 4, 1799 – March 3, 1801
- Preceded by: David Brooks
- Succeeded by: Thomas Tillotson
- In office March 4, 1793 – March 3, 1797
- Preceded by: Peter Silvester
- Succeeded by: David Brooks

Personal details
- Born: October 12, 1758 Fishkill, Province of New York, British America
- Died: September 6, 1828 (aged 69) New York City, New York, U.S.
- Party: Anti-Administration, Democratic-Republican
- Spouse: Rebecca Tallmadge
- Children: Catherine Rebecca Bailey; Ann Eliza Bailey
- Profession: lawyer, politician

Military service
- Branch/service: New York Militia
- Battles/wars: American Revolution

Theodorus Bailey (October 12, 1758 – September 6, 1828) was an American lawyer and politician from Poughkeepsie, New York, who represented New York in both the U.S. House and Senate.

== Early life ==
Bailey was born near Fishkill in the Province of New York on October 12, 1758 where he attended the rural schools and studied law. He was admitted to the bar in 1778 and commenced practice in Poughkeepsie, New York.

== Career ==
He served with the New York Militia during the Revolutionary War. He also served in the State militia from 1786 until 1805 and attained the rank of brigadier general.

Bailey ran for Congress in March 1789, but was defeated by Federalist Egbert Benson, and lost a rematch with Benson in 1790. Bailey was elected as a Democratic-Republican to the 3rd and the 4th United States Congresses, serving from March 4, 1793, to March 3, 1797. He was elected again to the 6th United States Congress, serving from March 4, 1799, to March 3, 1801. In April 1801, he was elected to the New York State Assembly, but vacated his seat before the State Legislature convened, because he was elected to the 7th United States Congress to fill the vacancy caused by the resignation of Thomas Tillotson, and served from December 7, 1801, to March 3, 1803.

In 1803, Bailey was elected a U.S. Senator from New York, and served from March 4, 1803, to January 16, 1804, when he resigned to accept the position of Postmaster of New York City, which he held until his death.

== Personal life ==
Bailey was married to Rebecca Tallmadge (1779–1807). She was the daughter of Col. James Tallmadge (1744–1821) and the sister of Matthias B. Tallmadge (1774–1819), a federal judge from New York, and James Tallmadge Jr. (1778–1853), who was a U.S. Representative and who served as Lieutenant Governor of New York under De Witt Clinton. Together, they were the parents of:

- Catherine Rebecca Bailey (1804–1844), who married William Cecil Woolsey (1796–1840) in 1829.
- Ann Eliza Bailey (d. 1878), who married Arthur Bronson (1801–1844), a son of Isaac Bronson.

Bailey died in New York, New York County, New York, on September 6, 1828 (age 69 years, 330 days). He was interred at Dutch Burying Ground, Manhattan, New York; and was re-interred on January 8, 1864, at Poughkeepsie Rural Cemetery, Poughkeepsie, New York.

U.S. House of Representatives
Preceded by Peter Silvester	Member of the U.S. House of Representatives from New York's 5th congressional district 1793–1797	Succeeded by David Brooks
Preceded by David Brooks	Member of the U.S. House of Representatives from New York's 5th congressional district 1799–1801	Succeeded by Thomas Tillotson
Preceded by Thomas Tillotson	Member of the U.S. House of Representatives from New York's 5th congressional district 1801–1803	Succeeded by Andrew McCord
U.S. Senate
Preceded by Gouverneur Morris	U.S. senator (Class 1) from New York; 1803–1804; Served alongside: DeWitt Clinton, John Armstrong, Jr.	Succeeded by John Armstrong, Jr.
