= Peter van Schaack =

American lawyer

Peter Van Schaack
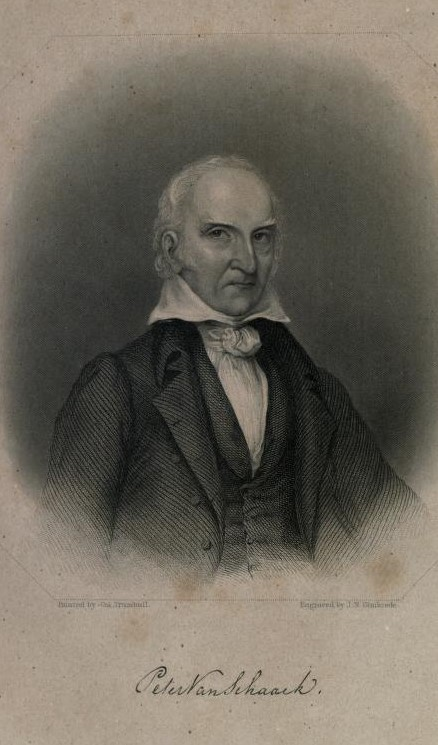
- Born: March 1747; Kinderhook, Province of New York, British North America, British Empire
- Died: September 17, 1832 (aged 85); Kinderhook, New York, US
- Education: King's College
- Occupation: Lawyer
- Spouse(s): Elizabeth Cruger, Elizabeth Van Allen
- Children: 14
- Relatives: Peter Silvester (brother-in-law), Henry Cruger (brother-in-law)

Peter Van Schaack (March 1747 – 17 September 1832) was an American lawyer, born in Kinderhook, New York. He studied law at King's College (later Columbia University); was a successful and well-respected colonial lawyer; collected, revised, and digested the laws of the Colony of New York from 1691 to 1773; and operated one of the first law schools in the United States.

== Early life and education ==
Peter Van Schaack was born in March 1747 in Kinderhook, New York, the youngest of seven children of Cornelius Van Schaack (a successful merchant, a Hudson River skipper, a landowner, a magistrate, a colonel in the provincial militia, and a church elder) and Mrs. Lydia Van Schaack (née Van Dyck, a descendant of the prominent Schuyler family of Albany).

Neither of Peter Van Schaack's parents were educated, but they insisted on his schooling. When he was of age, he attended school in Kinderhook. He was a shy boy who found classroom recitations frightening. He did not care for his teacher but soon discovered that he had a gift for learning. He had hoped to enter the army following the model of his oldest brother, but that sentiment soon passed. His father believed Peter was destined to enter one of the liberal professions, and sent him to Staten Island in 1760 to be tutored by the Rev. Richard Charlton - a graduate of Trinity College Dublin. Charlton had taken up the position of Rector of The Church of St. Andrew on Staten Island in 1747 “and became an esteemed and respected member of the Staten Island community.” Under Charlton's mentorship, Peter Van Schaack became an exceptional student of Latin. As such, he became very familiar with Roman civil wars and the devastation they caused. In 1762, Van Schaack entered King's College. There, he befriended John Jay, Egbert Benson, Richard Harrison, Gouverneur Morris, and Robert R. Livingston – people who would become life-long friends in spite of political differences.

Needing to support his new family, Peter Van Schaack left King's College in the spring of 1766, before earning his degree, to study law in the office of his brother-in-law, Peter Silvester of Albany. Eighteen months later, the Supreme Court of the province of New York changed the rules for admission to the bar lengthening the time period for a clerkship from five to seven years unless the clerk was a college graduate. In which case, only a three-year clerkship was required. Peter responded by quickly relocating back to New York where he resumed his studies at King's College and clerked part-time (with his friend Robert R. Livingston) for William Smith, Jr. of New York City – one of the most distinguished lawyers of the day. It was there that he first encountered Blackstone's Commentaries – a text he regarded as a godsend for its clear and systematic presentation of the law. Peter graduated King's College in the spring of 1768 with highest honors and having won several prizes for scholarship. He immediately applied for admission to the bar, even though he was still five months shy of the required clerkship. He was anxious to practice seeing significant opportunities then for legal work. The Supreme Court overlooked his incomplete work record and, in January 1769, he was admitted to the bar.

== Career ==
Peter Van Schaack opened a law office on Cedar Street in New York City. His prospects for success were outstanding. A top graduate of King's College, a former clerk of one of the most prominent lawyers of the day, and with the aid of retainers from Peter Silvester and his in-laws, he quickly developed a successful practice focusing on probate, debt collection, and disputed land titles. Kinderhook was embroiled in boundary disputes and Peter was called on to litigate several of them. Maxwell Bloomfield has noted that he developed the belief that “the insecurity of property rights in real estate transactions posed as great a threat to the welfare of the province as any of England’s tax measures.”

In November 1770, The Moot was established, which provided an opportunity for practitioners (senior and junior) to debate points of law with the aim of seeking their improvement. Individual club members included: William Livingston, William Smith, James Duane, Samuel Jones, John Tabor Kempe, Peter Van Schaack, Rudolphus Ritzema, Benjamin Kissam, Gouverneur Morris, Stephen Delancey, John Jay, and others. Peter Van Schaack served as secretary. The Moot focused on issues of common law. The decisions arrived at as a result of the debates acquired great authority, and were considered as settled by the New York bar generally.

On 24 March 1772, due to his growing reputation and with the aid of his wife's uncle John Cruger, Jr. (Speaker of the New York Assembly), Peter Van Schaack was appointed to collect, revise, and digest the laws of the Colony of New York from 1691 to 1773. Peter needed to search in the Council Books and Journals of the General Assembly in order to determine which Acts had received royal assent, which were repealed, and which remained probationary. He was instructed to place the Acts in order, to divide them into chapters and sections, to provide notations in the margins as to the status of the Acts, and to make an index and table of all the principal matters in the Acts. Once completed to the satisfaction of designated government officials, Peter would be paid 250 pounds. Laws of New-York, From The Year 1691, to 1773 inclusive was published in 1774. At 836 pages with an index of 53 pages, it was considered an indispensable work by practicing lawyers in New York and helped Van Schaack develop a reputation as an authority on New York law.

In May 1775, Peter Van Schaack moved to Kinderhook in search of relief from the growing turmoil of New York City and out of concern for the health of his family. His hopes, however, were dashed. He resumed his legal practice in Kinderhook and soon took on the representation of people who had claims to press for the seizure of their property by radicals. A Committee of Correspondence from Pittsfield, Massachusetts quickly censured him for representing “Tories” against “Friends of the Country.” His correspondence was opened by the order of the Provincial Congress, and read publicly in Albany.

=== American Revolution ===
Van Schaack maintained neutrality during the American Revolution, but was eventually branded a loyalist—a description he rejected. In January 1776, he wrote that he believed the colonies to be part of the British Empire and subordinate to Parliament, but that he also believed that there needed to be a check on the powers of Parliament regarding the colonies and expressed hope that the conflict would lead to the establishments of such a check. Van Schaack was committed to seeking a peaceful resolution to the hostilities, and he refused to take up arms because he feared the consequences for his countrymen.

On 21 December 1776, the Committee for Detecting Conspiracies (created by the New York Convention) noted that Peter Van Schaack had “long maintained an equivocal Neutrality in the present Struggles” and “in General supposed unfriendly to the American Cause and from [his] influence [is] enabled to do it essential Injury.” The Committee for Detecting Conspiracies summoned Peter Van Schaack and his brother to appear to ask whether they consider themselves to be subjects of New York or of Great Britain, and either impose an oath of allegiance or remove them to Boston. On 9 January 1777, he appeared before the committee and was asked to take an oath of allegiance to the independent state of New York. He refused, but explained his reasons. "I am condemned … upon a charge of maintaining an equivocal neutrality in the present struggles…. When I appeared before the Albany Committee, I refused to answer the question [of my allegiance]…. The reason … it is premature, to tender an oath of allegiance before the government to which it imposes subjection, the time it is to take place of the present exceptionable one, and who are to be the rulers, as well as the mode of their appointment in future, are known…. I hold it that you cannot justly put me to the alternative of choosing to be a subject of Great Britain, or of this State, because should I deny subjection to Great Britain, it would not follow that I must necessarily be a member of the State of New-York; on the contrary, I should still hold that I had a right, by the “immutable laws of nature,” to choose any other State of which I would become a member."

In June 1778, Peter Van Schaack received permission from Governor Clinton to visit England to obtain medical attention for his failing eyesight. Shortly thereafter, the Legislature of New York passed the Banishing Act. It required that “all such persons of neutral and equivocal characters in this State” take an oath acknowledging New York to be a free and independent state. If they refused, they were to be sent behind enemy lines, their names recorded in the office of the Secretary of State, their property assessed double taxes in perpetuity, and their return to the State punished by a conviction for “misprision of treason.” Peter was summoned before commissioners of conspiracies at Albany, and on 18 July 1778 refused to take the oath. The Commissioners ordered his banishment pursuant to the Act. On his way to New York City to depart for England, he met Governor Clinton who gave him assurances that the Banishing Act did not apply to him and presented Peter a certificate explaining that the Governor had given Peter permission to travel to England to have a cataract treated. Peter Van Schaack travelled to England and remained there for seven years.

“While in England,” Benjamin F. Butler wrote, “he was consulted in many cases involving intricate and important legal questions, and on one occasion in particular he was associated with Lord Chancellor Eldon, whose reputation, it is believed, was much enhanced by pursuing the advice and adopting the views of Mr. Van Schaack.” He was often asked by his fellow countrymen to help them secure remuneration from the British government for the losses they suffered as a result of the revolution. He rendered his services often and without compensation. Van Schaack gradually became disillusioned with the British government. In January 1780, he came to the conclusion that he no longer had allegiance to it. He wrote that he initially believed that British actions towards the American colonies were motivated by a need for “solid revenue,” but that he came to realize that “the real design was to enhance the influence of the Crown, by multiplying officers dependent on it. In short, to establish in the Colonies the system of corruption by which their government here is carried on.” Van Schaack came to believe that the British constitution, he had so admired, was no longer in existence.

=== Return to New York ===
In 1784, an act was passed by the New York Legislature restoring Peter Van Schaack and three other men, "all their rights, privileges and immunities, as citizens" upon taking the oath of allegiance as prescribed by law. Van Schaack returned to Kinderhook in 1785, complied with the law, and built a house in which to live. He was readmitted to the bar in 1786 and resumed practice in Kinderhook.

=== Law School ===
His eyesight had been plaguing him for many years and, in 1786, he went blind. He relinquished his professional duties and began teaching law students in his home. His law school operated from 1786 to 1830 and he taught more than 100 students. In 1809, he owned 1900 pounds of real estate and had a personal estate of 1200 pounds, making him one of the wealthier residents of Kinderhook. In 1826, Columbia College conferred on him the degree of Doctor of Laws.

== Personal life ==
In 1765, while still in college, he met and married Elizabeth Cruger (1747-1778), daughter of Henry Cruger (1707–1780) – a prominent New York City merchant. Fearful of the disapproval of Elizabeth's father, the couple eloped. They were right about Mr. Cruger for when he learned of the marriage, he threw his wig onto the fire. After his first grandchild was born, however, he welcomed Peter into the family. Peter and Elizabeth had five children. On April 27, 1789, Peter married Elizabeth Van Allen of Kinderhook. They had nine children. Elizabeth (Van Allen) died in 1813.

== Death ==
Peter Van Schaack died in Kinderhook on September 17, 1832, and is buried in the Kinderhook Reformed Church Cemetery.
