= 1807 United States Senate election in New York =

The 1807 United States Senate election in New York was held on February 3, 1807, by the New York State Legislature to elect a United States senator (Class 3) to represent the State of New York in the United States Senate.

== Background ==
John Smith had been elected to this seat in February 1804, after the resignation of DeWitt Clinton, replacing the temporarily appointed John Armstrong. Smith took his seat on February 23, 1804, and his term would expire on March 3, 1807.

At the State election in April 1806, the Democratic-Republican Party (D-R) won a large majority to the Assembly (82 D-R and 18 Federalist), and all 9 State Senate seats up for election. The 30th New York State Legislature met from January 27 to April 7, 1807, at Albany, New York.

== Candidates ==
The incumbent U.S. Senator John Smith ran for re-election as the candidate of the Democratic-Republican Party. At this time the Democratic-Republican Party was split in two factions: the "Lewisites" (allies of Governor Morgan Lewis), and the "Clintonians" (allies of Mayor of New York DeWitt Clinton). The Federalist Party which had no seats in the State Senate and only a small minority in the State Assembly was allied in State politics with the Lewisites, the smaller faction, thus forming a bloc large enough to outvote the Clintonians. Nevertheless, for the election of a U.S. Senator both Democratic-Republican factions united supporting Smith.

== Result ==
The incumbent John Smith was re-elected.

1807 United States Senator election result
Office	House	Democratic-Republican	Federalist
U.S. Senator	State Senate (32 members)	John Smith	
	State Assembly (100 members)	John Smith	

== Aftermath ==
John Smith served until the end of the term on March 3, 1813.

== Sources ==
- The New York Civil List compiled in 1858 (see: pg. 63 for U.S. Senators; pg. 119f for State Senators 1806–07; pg. 180 for Members of Assembly 1806–07) [gives date of election "February 3"]
- Members of the 10th United States Congress
- History of Political Parties in the State of New-York by Jabez Delano Hammond (page 237) [gives date of election "first day of February"]
