= Barent Gardenier =

American politician (1776–1822)

Member of the U.S. House of Representatives from New York
- In office March 4, 1807 – March 3, 1811
- Preceded by: Martin G. Schuneman
- Succeeded by: Thomas B. Cooke
- Constituency: 7th district (1807–09); 5th district (1809–11)

Personal details
- Born: July 28, 1776 Kinderhook, New York, U.S.
- Died: January 10, 1822 (aged 45) New York, New York
- Resting place: Old Dutch Churchyard, First Reformed Church, Kingston, New York
- Party: Federalist
- Spouse: Sally (Sarah) Lawrence (m. 1801)
- Education: Litchfield Law School
- Profession: Attorney

Barent Gardenier (July 28, 1776 – January 10, 1822) was an American lawyer and politician from New York. He was a United States representative from 1807 to 1811.

== Biography ==
Barent Gardenier was born in Kinderhook, New York, on July 28, 1776. He received a liberal education, studied law at Litchfield Law School and was admitted to the bar. In November 1801 he married Sally (Sarah) Lawrence.

Gardenier practiced in Kingston, New York, and was also editor and publisher of a Federalist newspaper, the New York Courier. He was elected as a Federalist to the 10th and 11th United States Congresses, and served from March 4, 1807, to March 3, 1811.

He had a heated controversy with Senator John Armstrong relating to the latter's alleged authorship of the famous Newburgh letters, anonymous circulars in which the author (presumably Armstrong) had attempted unsuccessfully to instigate Continental Army soldiers to act against Congress at the end of the American Revolution in order to secure back pay, pensions and land grants that had been promised but were not immediately forthcoming. Armstrong denied writing the letters, but historians are of the view that Armstrong was the author. By the early 1800s Armstrong was a Democratic-Republican politician and follower of Thomas Jefferson, which caused the Federalist Gardenier to highlight Armstrong's supposed authorship of the Newburgh letters as a campaign issue.

In 1808 Gardenier fought a duel with George W. Campbell, a congressman from Tennessee, resulting from Gardenier's opposition to the Jefferson administration's trade embargo with Great Britain and France. Campbell was angered at Gardenier's speech, and in Gardenier's view included personal insults in his rebuttal speech. Gardenier challenged Campbell, and their duel was notable as being the first to be fought on what became the Bladensburg Dueling Grounds. Gardenier was wounded, but subsequently recovered and won reelection.

From 1813 to 1815, Gardenier was District Attorney of the First District which included New York, Queens, Kings, Suffolk, Richmond and Westchester Counties.

Gardenier died in New York City on January 10, 1822. He is buried at Kingston's First Reformed Church.

== Congressional record ==
His speeches given in the 10th and 11th congresses appear in:

- Abridgement of the Debates of Congress from 1789-1856, D. Appleton & Co. 1857, vol. 3, p. 612.
- The Rep. from N.Y. on building gunboats, pp. 627–629.
- inquiry into conduct of Gen. Wilkinson, 1807; vol. iv. 1808-1813, p. 87.
- re submission to the late edicts of England & France, p. 137.
- on remunerating those who resisted the law for direct tax, p. 139.
- on prosecutions for libel, p. 192.
- re the call on the President (James Madison, 1809) for papers, p. 215.
- supports petition of Elizabeth Hamilton; also referenced on pp. 48, 124, 191, and 350.

U.S. House of Representatives
| Preceded by Martin G. Schuneman | Member of the U.S. House of Representatives from New York's 7th congressional district 1807–1809 | Succeeded by Killian K. Van Rensselaer |
| Preceded by John Blake, Jr. | Member of the U.S. House of Representatives from New York's 5th congressional district 1809–1811 | Succeeded by Thomas Cooke |
Legal offices
| Preceded by Richard Riker | New York County District Attorney; 1813–1815 | Succeeded by John Rodman |
