= Peter Livingston =

Peter Livingston may refer to:

- Peter R. Livingston (politician, born 1766) (1766–1847), American politician, acting lieutenant governor of New York 1828
- Peter R. Livingston (politician, born 1737) (1737–1794), American landowner, soldier and politician, member of the New York General Assembly
- Peter Van Brugh Livingston (1710–1792), American merchant and New York state treasurer, 1776–1778
