= Joshua Dewey =

American politician

Joshua Dewey (April 7, 1767 – February 23, 1864) was an American politician and veteran of the American Revolutionary War and the War of 1812.

Dewey was born in Lebanon, Connecticut, April 7, 1767, where his father, Daniel Dewey, resided as a farmer. The son was fitted for college in his native town, at the Lebanon School of the well-known "Master Tisdale", Nathan Tisdale.

After the burning of New London in the Battle of Groton Heights in 1781, he shouldered his musket and became for a time one of the garrison of Fort Griswold on the Thames River.

Dewey graduated from Yale College in 1787. From 1859 until his death, Dewey was the oldest living graduate of Yale.

He moved in 1791 to Cooperstown, New York, and taught a school in which James Fenimore Cooper is said to have learned the alphabet. Two years later he became a farmer in that neighborhood and began to enter into public life. He was thrice elected a member of the New York Legislature, and was afterwards commissioned by President John Adams as a Collector of Internal Revenue. In 1809, he moved to the new town of De Kalb, New York, where he also exercised various political functions, being a supervisor of the town, a county magistrate and a commissioner of schools. In the War of 1812, he joined the militia for a short time in the defense of Ogdensburg, New York. In 1817, he became a religious man, and with his wife and four children united with a Presbyterian Church.

In 1830, he moved to Watertown, New York, and subsequently to Sackets Harbor, New York, and then to Auburn, New York. In his later years, he resided with his son Lewis, in Brooklyn, (where he attended the church of Rev T L Cuyler,) and also with his daughter, Mrs Woolsey Butterfield, at whose house in Watertown he died in Feb 23, 1864, his ninety-seventh year. In his later years he also repeatedly attended the Commencements of Yale College. His mind was clear and his health good till the end of his days.

In 1787, he married Miss Lora Loomis (dau. of Israel Loomis and Rebeckah Bingham), who died in 1841.
