= Stephen Thorn =

American politician from New York (c. 1771 – after 1825)

Member of the New York Senate from the 2nd district
- In office 1823–1825
- Preceded by: District created
- Succeeded by: Peter R. Livingston

Member of the New York Senate from the Eastern district
- In office 1804–1808
- Preceded by: Multi-member district
- Succeeded by: District reorganized

Member of the New York State Assembly from the Dutchess County district
- In office 1819–1819
- Preceded by: Multi-member district
- Succeeded by: Multi-member district

Personal details
- Born: c. 1771
- Died: after 1825
- Party: People's Party
- Occupation: Merchant, politician

Stephen Thorn (c. 1771 – after 1825) was an American merchant and politician from New York. He served in the New York State Senate from 1804 to 1808, representing the Eastern District, and later from 1823 to 1825, representing the 2nd District. He also served in the New York State Assembly in 1819.

== Early life and business career ==
Stephen Thorn was born about 1771. He was a merchant-trader in Granville, Washington County, New York, during the early 1790s. An ardent republican, Thorn in 1794–96 solicited support among officials in France for a plan to retake Canada and encouraged a French attack on Quebec from Vermont. He chartered the Olive Branch to carry arms to America for the effort, but it encountered a British naval vessel and was forced to turn back. Thorn eventually abandoned his plans.

In December 1796, he went to London to help Thomas Paine with a reprint of an open letter to George Washington.

== Political career ==
Upon his return to New York, Thorn was an officer in the county and state militia. He subsequently served in the New York State Senate, representing the Eastern District from 1804 to 1808.

In April 1808, Thorn wrote to James Madison from the Senate Chamber regarding a constituent's patent application.

In 1819, Thorn was elected to the New York State Assembly from Dutchess County.

In 1822, Thorn was elected to the State Senate from the newly created 2nd District under the Constitution of 1821. He served in the 46th (1823), 47th (1824), and 48th (1825) sessions. He was listed as a member of the People's Party. His term ended in 1825, and he was succeeded by Peter R. Livingston.

== Personal life and death ==
Thorn died after 1825.

New York State Senate
Preceded by Multi-member district	New York State Senate; Eastern District; 1804–1808	Succeeded by District reorganized
Preceded by District created	New York State Senate; 2nd District; 1823–1825	Succeeded by Peter R. Livingston
