= Alexander Sheldon =

American Physician and politician

Alexander Sheldon (October 23, 1766 in Suffield, Hartford County, Connecticut – September 10, 1836 in Montgomery County, New York) was an American medical doctor and politician.

== Life ==
He was the son of Phineas Sheldon (1717–1807) and Ruth Harmon Sheldon (1733–1805). He graduated from Yale College in 1787. He was a member of the New York State Assembly from 1800 to 1808, in 1812 and in 1826, and was Speaker in 1804, 1805, 1806, 1808 and 1812. He was the last of the Speakers that wore the Cocked Hat as the badge of office.

He graduated from the New York College of Physicians and Surgeons in 1812.

He was a regent of the University of the State of New York. He was a delegate to the New York State Constitutional Convention of 1821.

He was married to Miriam King (b. 1770 Suffield). Their son, Smith Sheldon (1811–1884), established the publishing-house of Sheldon and Company. Their daughter Delia Sheldon was the mother of the Presbyterian missionary, Sheldon Jackson, who established more than a hundred churches, mostly in the Western United States.

== Sources ==
- Bio at Famous Americans
- Ancestry
- Members of NYSA from Montg. Co.

Political offices
Preceded by Thomas Storm	Speaker of the New York State Assembly; 1804–1806	Succeeded by Andrew McCord
Preceded by Andrew McCord	Speaker of the New York State Assembly; 1808	Succeeded by James W. Wilkin
Preceded by William Ross	Speaker of the New York State Assembly; 1812	Succeeded by Jacob R. Van Rensselaer
