= Martin G. Schuneman =

American politician

Member of the U.S. House of Representatives from New York's 7th district
- In office March 4, 1805 – March 3, 1807
- Preceded by: Josiah Hasbrouck
- Succeeded by: Barent Gardenier

Member of the New York State Assembly
- In office 1798–1800

Personal details
- Born: Martin Gerretsen Schuneman; February 10, 1764 Catskill, Province of New York, British America
- Died: February 21, 1827 (aged 63) Catskill, New York, U.S.
- Resting place: Old Cemetery, Leeds, New York, U.S.
- Party: Democratic-Republican
- Profession: Politician, judge, businessman

Martin Gerretsen Schuneman (February 10, 1764 – February 21, 1827) was a United States representative from New York.

Born in Catskill, he was educated by his father, a clergyman. Town histories recount that Schuneman was well known in upstate New York because of his imposing physique; he was six feet three inches tall, and weighed nearly 300 pounds.

In 1792 he was appointed a justice of the peace for Albany County, which then included Catskill. He operated a successful general store, and owned an inn in Madison, now called Leeds, as well as gristmills and other business ventures.

He was Catskill's Town Supervisor in 1797, 1799, and 1802. He was a member of the New York State Assembly in 1798 to 1800 when Catskill was part of Ulster County. He was a delegate from newly formed Greene County to the State constitutional convention in 1801, and represented a Greene County district in the Assembly in 1802.

In 1804 he was elected as a Democratic-Republican to the Ninth Congress, holding office from March 4, 1805, to March 3, 1807.

He resumed his former business pursuits and died in Catskill on February 21, 1827. He was buried at the Old Cemetery in Leeds.

U.S. House of Representatives
Preceded by Josiah Hasbrouck	Member of the U.S. House of Representatives from New York's 7th congressional district 1805–1807	Succeeded by Barent Gardenier
