= Nathaniel King =

Nathaniel Thomas King (14 July 1847 – 12 June 1884) was one of the earliest western-trained West African doctors to practise medicine in what is now Nigeria.

== Life ==
King was born in Hastings, Sierra Leone, to the Krio/ Saro- family of Reverend Thomas and Mary King. His father was a catechist of the Church Missionary Society who assisted Ajayi Crowther in translating the Bible to Yoruba. In 1850, his father moved to from Sierra Leone to the Yoruba mission in Abeokuta, Ogun State, and the family went along with him. In 1861, the young King was recommended by Henry Venn as one of the four students to be trained at a Church Mission Society (CMS) pre-medical training program under Dr. A. A. Harrison, a Cambridge-trained doctor. However, Harrison died in 1865 and Venn recommended King to Fourah Bay College to continue his studies. While in Freetown, he also worked in the colonial hospital. King later went to King's College, London, with sponsorship from his uncle, Henry Robbin, and CMS. King obtained his MRCS from King's College and his medical degree from University of Edinburgh and University of Aberdeen in 1876. He returned to British Colonial Nigeria, the country his family migrated to and was involved in developing modern medical practice in the country.

In Nigeria, he promoted environmental sanitation, acted as an examiner for CMS Grammar School, Lagos, and Wesley College and he was also a trust member of the Rebecca Hussey fund for Africans.

He died in 1884 at the young age of 37.

== Sources ==
- Adeloye, Adelola (1976). "Nigerian pioneer doctors and early West African politics". Nigeria Magazine. 121 (121). Nigeria: 2–24. PMID 11615014.
- Ajayi, Ade (1965). Christian Missions in Nigeria, 1841-1891: The making of a new élite. London: Longmans.
