= 5th New York State Legislature =

New York state legislative session

| ← | 4th | 6th | → |
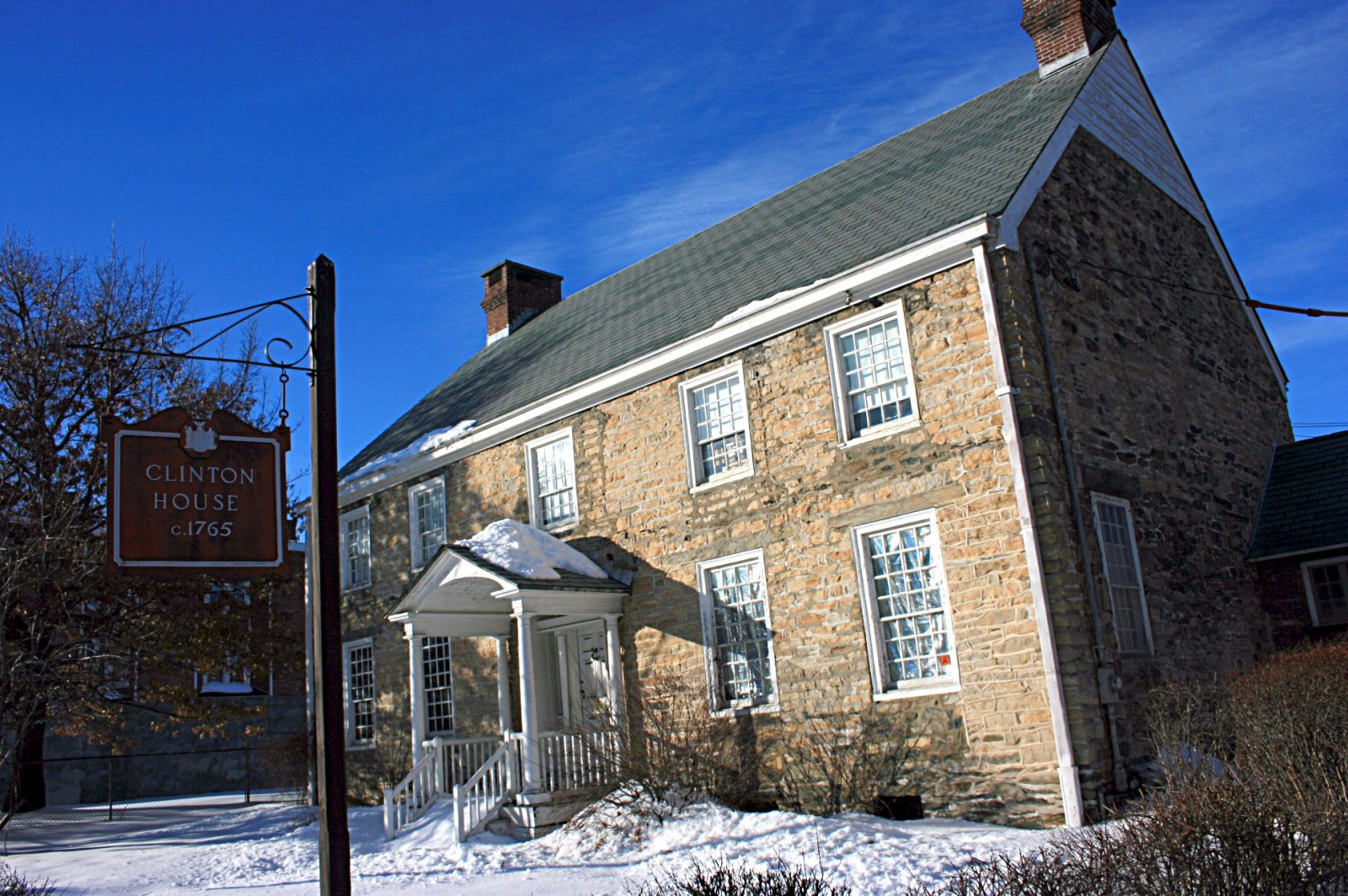
- Clinton House, Poughkeepsie (2007)

Overview
- Legislative body: New York State Legislature
- Jurisdiction: New York, United States
- Term: July 1, 1781 – June 30, 1782

Senate
- Members: 24
- President: {{{vp}}}

Assembly
- Members: 70 (de facto 65)
- Speaker: Evert Bancker

Sessions
- 1st: October 10 – November 23, 1781
- 2nd: February 21 – April 14, 1782

The 5th New York State Legislature, consisting of the New York State Senate and the New York State Assembly, met from October 10, 1781, to April 14, 1782, during the fifth year of George Clinton's governorship, at Poughkeepsie.

== Background ==
Under the provisions of the New York Constitution of 1777, the State Senators were elected on general tickets in the senatorial districts, and were then divided into four classes. Six senators each drew lots for a term of 1, 2, 3 or 4 years and, beginning at the election in April 1778, every year six Senate seats came up for election to a four-year term. Assemblymen were elected countywide on general tickets to a one-year term, the whole assembly being renewed annually.

On May 8, 1777, the Constitutional Convention had appointed the senators from the Southern District, and the assemblymen from Kings, New York, Queens, Richmond and Suffolk counties—the area which was under British control—and determined that these appointees serve in the Legislature until elections could be held in those areas, presumably after the end of the American Revolutionary War. Vacancies among the appointed members in the Senate should be filled by the Assembly, and vacancies in the Assembly by the Senate.

== Elections ==
The State elections were held from April 24 to 26, 1781. Under the determination by the Constitutional Convention, Senator Sir James Jay, whose seat was up for election, continued in office, as well as the assemblymen from Kings, New York, Queens, Richmond and Suffolk counties. Levi Pawling (Middle D.) and Alexander Webster (Eastern D.) were re-elected. John Haring (Middle D.), and ex-assemblymen Henry Oothoudt and William B. Whiting (Western D.) were also elected to the Senate. Ex-Assemblyman Thomas Palmer was elected in the Middle District to fill the vacancy caused by the expulsion of Ephraim Paine.

== Sessions ==
The State Legislature met in Poughkeepsie, the seat of Dutchess County. The Senate met first on October 10, 1781, the Assembly on October 24; the Senate adjourned on November 3, the Assembly on November 23. The Assembly reconvened on February 21, 1782, the Senate on February 23; and both Houses adjourned on April 14. The seat of Sir James Jay was declared vacant when he joined the Loyalists, and at the end of the American Revolutionary War he went into exile in London.

== State Senate ==
=== Districts ===
- The Southern District (9 seats) consisted of Kings, New York, Queens, Richmond, Suffolk and Westchester counties.
- The Middle District (6 seats) consisted of Dutchess, Orange and Ulster counties.
- The Eastern District (3 seats) consisted of Charlotte, Cumberland and Gloucester counties.
- The Western District (6 seats) consisted of Albany and Tryon counties.
Note: There are now 62 counties in the State of New York. The counties which are not mentioned in this list had not yet been established, or sufficiently organized, the area being included in one or more of the abovementioned counties. In 1784, Charlotte Co. was renamed Washington Co., and Tryon Co. was renamed Montgomery Co.

=== Senators ===
The asterisk (*) denotes members of the previous Legislature who continued in office as members of this Legislature.

| District | Senators | Term left | Notes |
|---|---|---|---|
| Southern | Isaac Roosevelt* | 1 year | holding over on appointment by Constitutional Convention |
| Southern | John Morin Scott* | 1 year | holding over on appointment by Constitutional Convention; also Secretary of State of New York |
| Southern | Jonathan Lawrence* | 2 years | holding over on appointment by Constitutional Convention |
| Southern | (Lewis Morris)* | 2 years | holding over on appointment by Constitutional Convention; did not attend |
| Southern | Stephen Ward* | 2 years | appointed by State Assembly |
| Southern | William Floyd* | 3 years | holding over on appointment by Constitutional Convention |
| Southern | William Smith* | 3 years | holding over on appointment by Constitutional Convention |
| Southern | Isaac Stoutenburgh* | 3 years | holding over on appointment by State Assembly; elected to the Council of Appointment |
| Southern | Sir James Jay* | 4 years | holding over on appointment by State Assembly; seat declared vacant from "inability to attend, being held a prisoner" |
| Middle | Henry Wisner* | 1 year | |
| Middle | Thomas Palmer | 2 years | elected to fill vacancy, in place of Ephraim Paine |
| Middle | Zephaniah Platt* | 2 years | elected to the Council of Appointment |
| Middle | Arthur Parks* | 3 years | |
| Middle | John Haring | 4 years | |
| Middle | Levi Pawling* | 4 years | died March 1782 |
| Eastern | (Ebenezer Russell)* | 1 year | did not attend |
| Eastern | (Elkanah Day)* | 3 years | did not attend |
| Eastern | Alexander Webster* | 4 years | elected to the Council of Appointment |
| Western | Jacob G. Klock* | 1 years | |
| Western | Abraham Yates Jr.* | 1 years | |
| Western | Abraham Ten Broeck | 2 years | also Mayor of Albany |
| Western | Philip Schuyler | 3 years | also New York State Surveyor General |
| Western | Henry Oothoudt | 4 years | elected to the Council of Appointment |
| Western | William B. Whiting | 4 years | |

=== Employees ===
- Clerk: Robert Benson

== State Assembly ==
=== Districts ===
- The City and County of Albany (10 seats)
- Charlotte County (4 seats)
- Cumberland County (3 seats)
- Dutchess County (7 seats)
- Gloucester County (2 seats)
- Kings County (2 seats)
- The City and County of New York (9 seats)
- Orange County (4 seats)
- Queens County (4 seats)
- Richmond County (2 seats)
- Suffolk County (5 seats)
- Tryon County (6 seats)
- Ulster County (6 seats)
- Westchester County (6 seats)
Note: There are now 62 counties in the State of New York. The counties which are not mentioned in this list had not yet been established, or sufficiently organized, the area being included in one or more of the abovementioned counties. In 1784, Charlotte Co. was renamed Washington Co., and Tryon Co. was renamed Montgomery Co.

=== Assemblymen ===
The asterisk (*) denotes members of the previous Legislature who continued as members of this Legislature.

| County | Assemblymen | Notes |
|---|---|---|
| Albany | Matthew Adgate* | |
| Albany | Jacob Ford | |
| Albany | Philip Frisbie | |
| Albany | John Lansing Jr.* | |
| Albany | George Palmer | |
| Albany | Dirck Swart* | |
| Albany | Samuel Ten Broeck | |
| Albany | Israel Thompson | |
| Albany | Isaac Vrooman* | |
| Albany | Edmund Wells | |
| Charlotte | David Hopkins* | |
| Charlotte | Hamilton McCollister* | |
| Charlotte | Matthew McWhorter* | |
| Charlotte | John Williams | |
| Cumberland | none | No election returns from these counties |
| Gloucester | none | No election returns from these counties |
| Dutchess | Dirck Brinckerhoff | |
| Dutchess | Jonathan Dennis | |
| Dutchess | Cornelius Humfrey | |
| Dutchess | Ebenezer Husted | |
| Dutchess | Abraham Paine | |
| Dutchess | Thomas Storm | |
| Dutchess | Jacobus Swartwout* | |
| Kings | William Boerum* | holding over on appointment by Constitutional Convention |
| Kings | Henry Williams* | holding over on appointment by Constitutional Convention |
| New York | Evert Bancker* | holding over on appointment by Constitutional Convention; re-elected Speaker |
| New York | John Berrien* | holding over on appointment by the State Senate |
| New York | Abraham Brasher* | holding over on appointment by Constitutional Convention |
| New York | Daniel Dunscomb* | holding over on appointment by Constitutional Convention |
| New York | Robert Harpur* | holding over on appointment by Constitutional Convention |
| New York | Frederick Jay* | holding over on appointment by Constitutional Convention |
| New York | Abraham P. Lott* | holding over on appointment by Constitutional Convention |
| New York | Jacobus Van Zandt* | holding over on appointment by Constitutional Convention |
| New York | Peter P. Van Zandt* | holding over on appointment by Constitutional Convention |
| Orange | Jeremiah Clark | |
| Orange | John Hathorn | |
| Orange | John Stagg* | |
| Orange | John Suffern | |
| Queens | Benjamin Birdsall* | holding over on appointment by Constitutional Convention |
| Queens | Benjamin Coe* | holding over on appointment by Constitutional Convention |
| Queens | Philip Edsall* | holding over on appointment by Constitutional Convention; resigned on October 20, 1781; Nathaniel Tom was appointed by the State Senate on October 31, 1781, to fill the vacancy |
| Queens | Daniel Lawrence* | holding over on appointment by Constitutional Convention |
| Richmond | Joshua Mersereau* | holding over on appointment by Constitutional Convention |
| Richmond | vacant | |
| Suffolk | David Gelston* | holding over on appointment by Constitutional Convention |
| Suffolk | Ezra L'Hommedieu* | holding over on appointment by Constitutional Convention |
| Suffolk | Burnet Miller* | holding over on appointment by Constitutional Convention |
| Suffolk | Thomas Tredwell* | holding over on appointment by Constitutional Convention |
| Suffolk | Thomas Wickes* | holding over on appointment by Constitutional Convention |
| Tryon | Zephaniah Batchelor* | |
| Tryon | Abraham Garrison* | |
| Tryon | William Harper | |
| Tryon | Isaac Merselis | |
| Tryon | John Moore* | |
| Tryon | William Petrie | |
| Ulster | Johannes Bruyn | |
| Ulster | Charles DeWitt | |
| Ulster | Johannes Hardenbergh | |
| Ulster | Abraham Hasbrouck | |
| Ulster | James Hunter | |
| Ulster | vacant | |
| Westchester | Nathaniel Delivan | |
| Westchester | Abijah Gilbert | |
| Westchester | Zebediah Mills | |
| Westchester | Nathan Rockwell* | |
| Westchester | Thomas Thomas* | |
| Westchester | Jonathan G. Tompkins* | |

=== Employees ===
- Clerk: John McKesson

== Sources ==
- The New York Civil List compiled by Franklin Benjamin Hough (Weed, Parsons and Co., 1858) [see pg. 108 for Senate districts; pg. 111f for senators; pg. 148f for Assembly districts; pg. 160 for assemblymen]
