= 6th New York State Legislature =

New York state legislative session

←	5th	7th	→
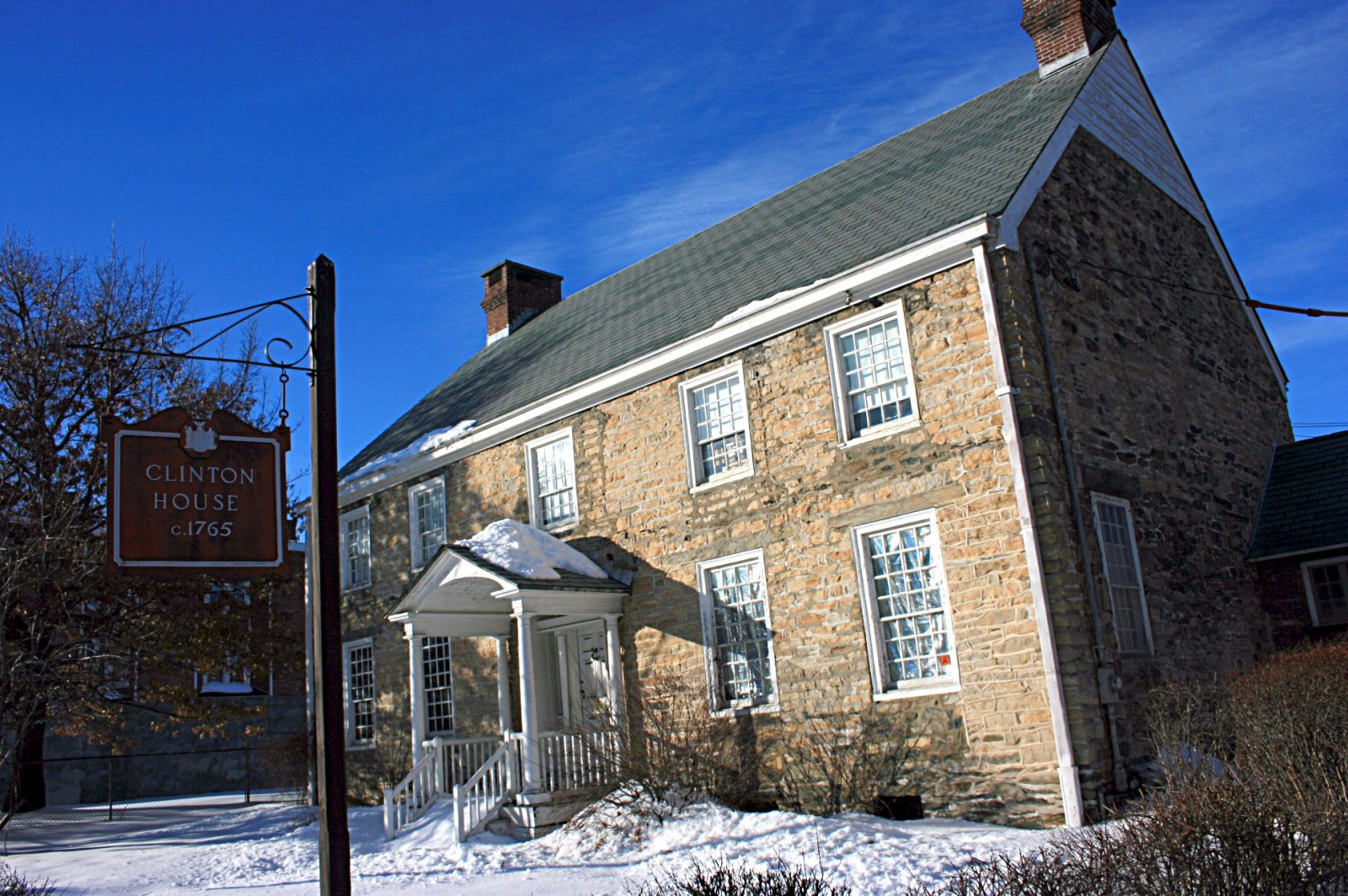
- Clinton House, Poughkeepsie (2007)

Overview
- Legislative body: New York State Legislature
- Jurisdiction: New York, United States
- Term: July 1, 1782 – June 30, 1783

Senate
- Members: 24
- President: Lt. Gov. Pierre Van Cortlandt

Assembly
- Members: 70 (de facto 65)
- Speaker: Evert Bancker

Sessions
- 1st: July 8 – 25, 1782
- 2nd: January 27 – March 27, 1783

The 6th New York State Legislature, consisting of the New York State Senate and the New York State Assembly, met from July 8, 1782, to March 27, 1783, during the sixth year of George Clinton's governorship, first at Poughkeepsie, then at Kingston.

== Background ==
Under the provisions of the New York Constitution of 1777, the State Senators were elected on general tickets in the senatorial districts, and were then divided into four classes. Six senators each drew lots for a term of 1, 2, 3 or 4 years and, beginning at the election in April 1778, every year six Senate seats came up for election to a four-year term. Assemblymen were elected countywide on general tickets to a one-year term, the whole assembly being renewed annually.

On May 8, 1777, the Constitutional Convention had appointed the senators from the Southern District, and the assemblymen from Kings, New York, Queens, Richmond and Suffolk counties—the area which was under British control—and determined that these appointees serve in the Legislature until elections could be held in those areas, presumably after the end of the American Revolutionary War. Vacancies among the appointed members in the Senate should be filled by the Assembly, and vacancies in the Assembly by the Senate.

== Elections ==
The State elections were held from April 30 to May 2, 1782. Under the determination by the Constitutional Convention, senators Isaac Roosevelt and John Morin Scott, whose seats were up for election, continued in office, as well as the assemblymen from Kings, New York, Queens, Richmond and Suffolk counties. Jacob G. Klock and Abraham Yates Jr. (both Western D.) were re-elected. William Allison (Middle D.) was also elected to the Senate. Two members who had been expelled previously were elected again to the Senate: Ephraim Paine (Middle D., to fill the vacancy caused by the death of Levi Pawling) and Assemblyman John Williams (Eastern D.)

== Sessions ==
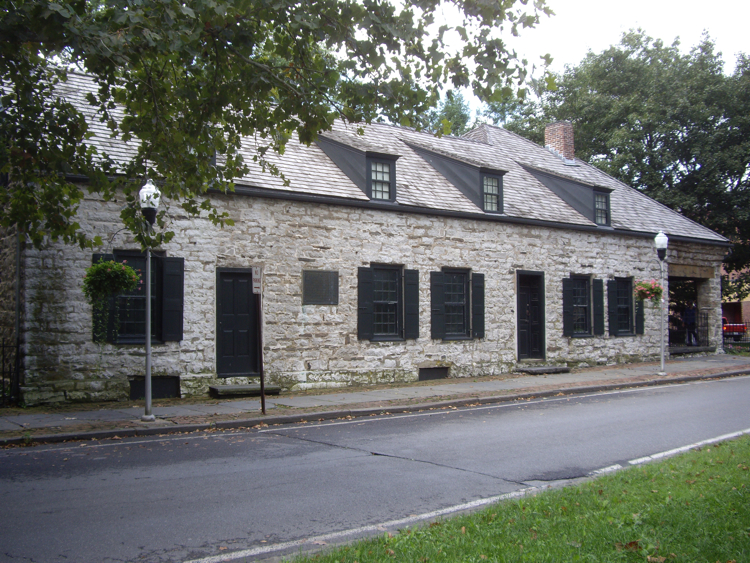
Senate House, Kingston

The State Legislature met in Poughkeepsie, the seat of Dutchess County. The Senate met first on July 8, 1782, the Assembly on July 11; and they adjourned on July 25. On July 22, James Duane was appointed by the Assembly to fill the vacancy caused by the absence of Sir James Jay. The Legislature reconvened in Kingston, the seat of Ulster County, on January 27, 1783; and the Assembly adjourned on March 23, the Senate on March 27.

== State Senate ==
=== Districts ===
- The Southern District (9 seats) consisted of Kings, New York, Queens, Richmond, Suffolk and Westchester counties.
- The Middle District (6 seats) consisted of Dutchess, Orange and Ulster counties.
- The Eastern District (3 seats) consisted of Charlotte, Cumberland and Gloucester counties.
- The Western District (6 seats) consisted of Albany and Tryon counties.
Note: There are now 62 counties in the State of New York. The counties which are not mentioned in this list had not yet been established, or sufficiently organized, the area being included in one or more of the abovementioned counties. In 1784, Charlotte Co. was renamed Washington Co., and Tryon Co. was renamed Montgomery Co.

=== Senators ===
The asterisk (*) denotes members of the previous Legislature who continued in office as members of this Legislature. John Williams changed from the Assembly to the Senate.

District	Senators	Term left	Notes
Southern	Jonathan Lawrence*	1 year	holding over on appointment by Constitutional Convention; elected to the Council of Appointment
Southern	(Lewis Morris)*	1 year	holding over on appointment by Constitutional Convention; did not attend
Southern	Stephen Ward*	1 year	appointed by State Assembly
Southern	William Floyd*	2 years	holding over on appointment by Constitutional Convention
Southern	William Smith*	2 years	holding over on appointment by Constitutional Convention
Southern	Isaac Stoutenburgh*	2 years	holding over on appointment by State Assembly
Southern	James Duane	3 years	appointed by the State Assembly on July 22, 1782, to fill vacancy, in place of Sir James Jay
Southern	Isaac Roosevelt*	4 year	holding over on appointment by Constitutional Convention
Southern	(John Morin Scott)*	4 year	holding over on appointment by Constitutional Convention; also Secretary of State of New York; did not attend
Middle	Thomas Palmer*	1 year	
Middle	Zephaniah Platt*	1 year	
Middle	Arthur Parks*	2 years	
Middle	John Haring*	3 years	elected to the Council of Appointment
Middle	Ephraim Paine	3 years	elected to fill vacancy, in place of Levi Pawling
Middle	William Allison	4 years	
Eastern	(Elkanah Day)*	2 years	elected to the Council of Appointment; did not attend
Eastern	Alexander Webster*	3 years	
Eastern	John Williams*	4 years	
Western	Abraham Ten Broeck*	1 year	also Mayor of Albany
Western	Philip Schuyler*	2 years	also New York State Surveyor General
Western	Henry Oothoudt*	3 years	
Western	William B. Whiting*	3 years	elected to the Council of Appointment
Western	Jacob G. Klock*	4 years	
Western	Abraham Yates Jr.*	4 years	

=== Employees ===
- Clerk: Robert Benson

== State Assembly ==
=== Districts ===
- The City and County of Albany (10 seats)
- Charlotte County (4 seats)
- Cumberland County (3 seats)
- Dutchess County (7 seats)
- Gloucester County (2 seats)
- Kings County (2 seats)
- The City and County of New York (9 seats)
- Orange County (4 seats)
- Queens County (4 seats)
- Richmond County (2 seats)
- Suffolk County (5 seats)
- Tryon County (6 seats)
- Ulster County (6 seats)
- Westchester County (6 seats)
Note: There are now 62 counties in the State of New York. The counties which are not mentioned in this list had not yet been established, or sufficiently organized, the area being included in one or more of the abovementioned counties. In 1784, Charlotte Co. was renamed Washington Co., and Tryon Co. was renamed Montgomery Co.

=== Assemblymen ===
The asterisk (*) denotes members of the previous Legislature who continued as members of this Legislature.

County	Assemblymen	Notes
Albany	Matthew Adgate*	
Albany	John H. Beekman	
Albany	John Ja. Beekman	
Albany	Jacob Ford*	
Albany	John Lansing Jr.*	
Albany	Dirck Swart*	
Albany	Samuel Ten Broeck*	
Albany	Peter Van Ness	
Albany	Christopher Yates	
Albany	John Younglove	
Charlotte	Benjamin Baker	
Charlotte	David Hopkins*	
Charlotte	Hamilton McCollister*	
Charlotte	Joseph McCracken	
Cumberland	none	No election returns from these counties
Gloucester	none	No election returns from these counties
Dutchess	Benjamin Birdsall	
Dutchess	Jonathan Dennis*	
Dutchess	Cornelius Humfrey*	
Dutchess	Ebenezer Husted*	
Dutchess	Matthew Patterson	
Dutchess	Thomas Storm*	
Dutchess	Jacobus Swartwout*	
Kings	William Boerum*	holding over on appointment by Constitutional Convention
Kings	Henry Williams*	holding over on appointment by Constitutional Convention
New York	Evert Bancker*	holding over on appointment by Constitutional Convention; re-elected Speaker
New York	John Berrien*	holding over on appointment by the State Senate
New York	Abraham Brasher*	holding over on appointment by Constitutional Convention
New York	Daniel Dunscomb*	holding over on appointment by Constitutional Convention
New York	Robert Harpur*	holding over on appointment by Constitutional Convention
New York	Frederick Jay*	holding over on appointment by Constitutional Convention
New York	Abraham P. Lott*	holding over on appointment by Constitutional Convention
New York	Jacobus Van Zandt*	holding over on appointment by Constitutional Convention
New York	Peter P. Van Zandt*	holding over on appointment by Constitutional Convention
Orange	Jeremiah Clark*	
Orange	Gilbert Cooper	
Orange	John Hathorn*	
Orange	John Stagg*	
Queens	Benjamin Birdsall*	holding over on appointment by Constitutional Convention
Queens	Benjamin Coe*	holding over on appointment by Constitutional Convention
Queens	Daniel Lawrence*	holding over on appointment by Constitutional Convention
Queens	Nathaniel Tom*	holding over on appointment by State Senate
Richmond	Joshua Mersereau*	holding over on appointment by Constitutional Convention
Richmond	vacant	
Suffolk	David Gelston*	holding over on appointment by Constitutional Convention
Suffolk	Ezra L'Hommedieu*	holding over on appointment by Constitutional Convention
Suffolk	Burnet Miller*	holding over on appointment by Constitutional Convention
Suffolk	Thomas Tredwell*	holding over on appointment by Constitutional Convention
Suffolk	Thomas Wickes*	holding over on appointment by Constitutional Convention
Tryon	Zephaniah Batchelor*	
Tryon	Frederick Fisher	
Tryon	John Frey	
Tryon	Andrew Finck Jr.	
Tryon	Christian Nellis	
Tryon	William Petrie*	
Ulster	Johannes Bruyn*	
Ulster	Charles DeWitt*	
Ulster	James Hunter*	
Ulster	William Malcom	
Ulster	John Nicholson	
Ulster	Cornelius C. Schoonmaker	
Westchester	Abijah Gilbert*	
Westchester	Samuel Haight	
Westchester	John Laurance	
Westchester	Zebediah Mills*	
Westchester	Ebenezer Purdy	
Westchester	Thomas Thomas*	

=== Employees ===
- Clerk: John McKesson
- Doorkeeper: Richard Ten Eyck

== Sources ==
- The New York Civil List compiled by Franklin Benjamin Hough (Weed, Parsons and Co., 1858) [see pg. 108 for Senate districts; pg. 112 for senators; pg. 148f for Assembly districts; pg. 160f for assemblymen]
