= 3rd New York State Legislature =

New York state legislative session

←	2nd	4th	→
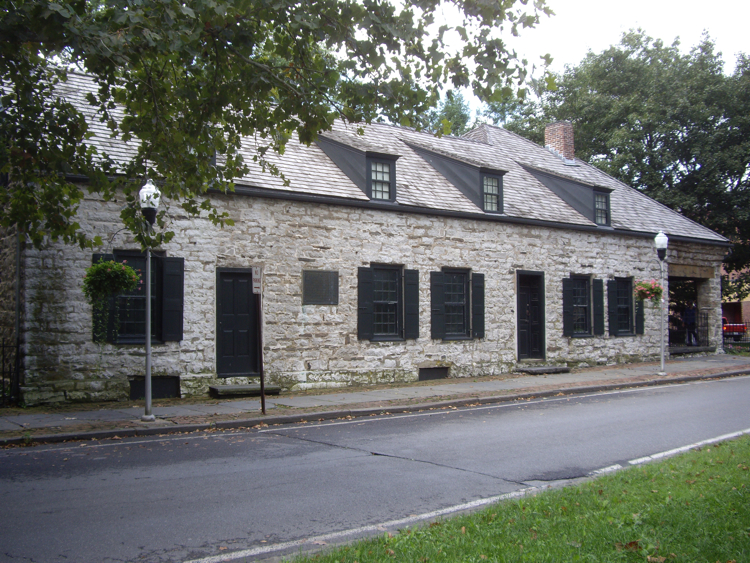
- Senate House, Kingston (2007)

Overview
- Legislative body: New York State Legislature
- Jurisdiction: New York, United States
- Term: July 1, 1779 – July 2, 1780

Senate
- Members: 24
- President: Lieutenant Governor Pierre Van Cortlandt

Assembly
- Members: 70 (de facto 68)
- Speaker: Evert Bancker

Sessions
- 1st: August 18 – October 25, 1779
- 2nd: January 27 – March 17, 1780
- 3rd: April 22 – July 2, 1780

The 3rd New York State Legislature, consisting of the New York State Senate and the New York State Assembly, met from August 18, 1779, to July 2, 1780, during the third year of George Clinton's governorship, first at Kingston, then at Albany, and finally at Kingston again.

== Background ==
Under the provisions of the New York Constitution of 1777, the State Senators were elected on general tickets in the senatorial districts, and were then divided into four classes. Six senators each drew lots for a term of 1, 2, 3 or 4 years and, beginning at the election in April 1778, every year six Senate seats came up for election to a four-year term. Assemblymen were elected countywide on general tickets to a one-year term, the whole assembly being renewed annually.

On May 8, 1777, the Constitutional Convention had appointed the senators from the Southern District, and the assemblymen from Kings, New York, Queens, Richmond and Suffolk counties—the area which was under British control—and determined that these appointees serve in the Legislature until elections could be held in those areas, presumably after the end of the American Revolutionary War. Vacancies among the appointed members in the Senate should be filled by the Assembly, and vacancies in the Assembly by the Senate.

== Elections ==
The State elections were held from April 27 to 29, 1779. Under the determination by the Constitutional Convention, the senators Jonathan Lawrence, Lewis Morris and Richard Morris, whose seats were up for election, continued in office, as well as the assemblymen from Kings, New York, Queens, Richmond and Suffolk counties. Zephaniah Platt (Middle D.) was re-elected. Ephraim Paine (Middle D.) and Abraham Ten Broeck (Western D.) were also elected to the Senate. In the Eastern District, a special election was held to fill the vacancy caused by the expulsion of John Williams, and Assemblyman Elishama Tozer was elected to a one-year term.

== Sessions ==
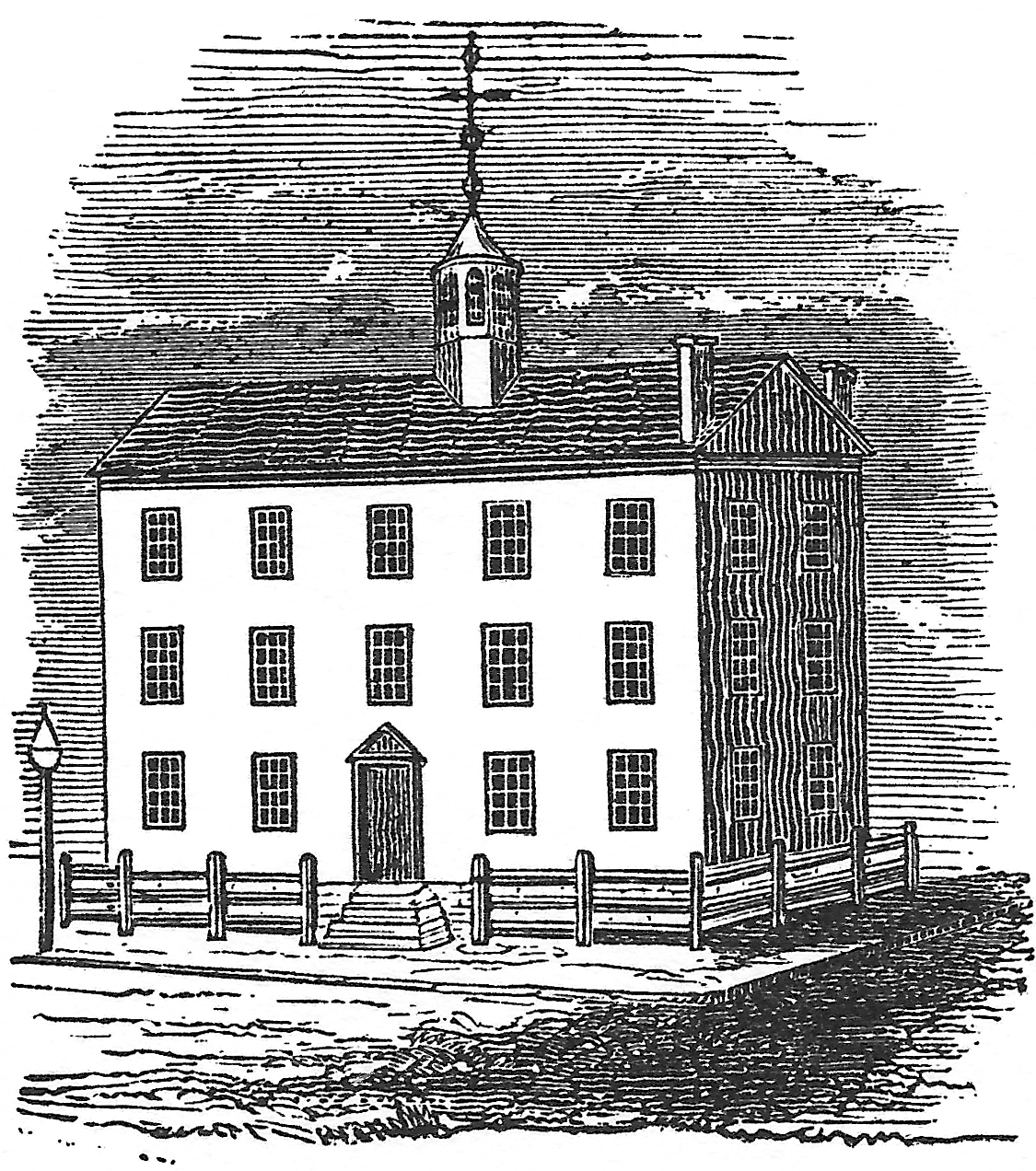
The Old Albany City Hall

The State Legislature met first in Kingston, the seat of Ulster County. The Assembly met on August 18, the Senate on August 24, 1779; and both adjourned on October 25. The Legislature reconvened at the Old City Hall in Albany, the seat of Albany County, on January 27, 1780; and the Senate adjourned on March 14, the Assembly on March 17. The Legislature reconvened again in Kingston on April 22, and adjourned finally on July 2. Senator Richard Morris (Southern D.) was appointed Chief Judge of the New York Supreme Court, and thus vacated his seat to which Ex-Assemblyman Stephen Ward was appointed.

== State Senate ==
=== Districts ===
- The Southern District (9 seats) consisted of Kings, New York, Queens, Richmond, Suffolk and Westchester counties.
- The Middle District (6 seats) consisted of Dutchess, Orange and Ulster counties.
- The Eastern District (3 seats) consisted of Charlotte, Cumberland and Gloucester counties.
- The Western District (6 seats) consisted of Albany and Tryon counties.
Note: There are now 62 counties in the State of New York. The counties which are not mentioned in this list had not yet been established, or sufficiently organized, the area being included in one or more of the abovementioned counties. In 1784, Charlotte Co. was renamed Washington Co., and Tryon Co. was renamed Montgomery Co.

=== Senators ===
The asterisk (*) denotes members of the previous Legislature who continued in office as members of this Legislature. Elishama Tozer changed from the Assembly to the Senate.

District	Senators	Term left	Notes
Southern	William Floyd*	1 year	appointed by Constitutional Convention
Southern	William Smith*	1 year	appointed by Constitutional Convention
Southern	Isaac Stoutenburgh*	1 year	appointed by State Assembly
Southern	Sir James Jay*	2 years	appointed by State Assembly
Southern	Isaac Roosevelt*	3 years	holding over on appointment by Constitutional Convention; elected to the Council of Appointment
Southern	John Morin Scott*	3 years	holding over on appointment by Constitutional Convention; also Secretary of State of New York
Southern	Jonathan Lawrence*	4 years	holding over on appointment by Constitutional Convention
Southern	Lewis Morris*	4 years	holding over on appointment by Constitutional Convention
Southern	Richard Morris*	4 years	holding over on appointment by State Assembly; appointed Chief Justice of the New York Supreme Court on October 23, 1779
Southern	Stephen Ward	4 years	appointed by the State Assembly on February 15, 1780, in place of Richard Morris
Middle	Arthur Parks*	1 year	
Middle	Levi Pawling*	2 years	elected to the Council of Appointment
Middle	Jesse Woodhull*	2 years	
Middle	Henry Wisner*	3 years	
Middle	Ephraim Paine	4 years	
Middle	Zephaniah Platt*	4 years	
Eastern	Elishama Tozer*	1 year	elected to fill vacancy, in place of John Williams; attended only the 3rd session
Eastern	Alexander Webster*	2 years	elected to the Council of Appointment
Eastern	(Ebenezer Russell)*	3 years	did not attend
Western	Anthony Van Schaick*	1 year	
Western	Jellis Fonda*	2 years	
Western	Rinier Mynderse*	2 years	elected to the Council of Appointment
Western	Jacob G. Klock*	3 years	
Western	Abraham Yates Jr.*	3 years	
Western	Abraham Ten Broeck	4 years	also Mayor of Albany

=== Employees ===
- Clerk: Robert Benson

== State Assembly ==
=== Districts ===
- The City and County of Albany (10 seats)
- Charlotte County (4 seats)
- Cumberland County (3 seats)
- Dutchess County (7 seats)
- Gloucester County (2 seats)
- Kings County (2 seats)
- The City and County of New York (9 seats)
- Orange County (4 seats)
- Queens County (4 seats)
- Richmond County (2 seats)
- Suffolk County (5 seats)
- Tryon County (6 seats)
- Ulster County (6 seats)
- Westchester County (6 seats)
Note: There are now 62 counties in the State of New York. The counties which are not mentioned in this list had not yet been established, or sufficiently organized, the area being included in one or more of the abovementioned counties. In 1784, Charlotte Co. was renamed Washington Co., and Tryon Co. was renamed Montgomery Co.

=== Assemblymen ===
The asterisk (*) denotes members of the previous Legislature who continued as members of this Legislature.

County	Assemblymen	Notes
Albany	Flores Bancker	
Albany	John Bay	
Albany	James Gordon*	
Albany	Cornelius Humfrey	
Albany	Hugh Mitchell	
Albany	Henry Oothoudt	
Albany	Henry Quackenbos	
Albany	Isaac Vrooman	
Albany	William B. Whiting*	
Albany	Phinehas Whiteside	
Charlotte	Albert Baker*	
Charlotte	John Grover	
Charlotte	David Hopkins*	
Charlotte	Noah Payn	
Cumberland	Elkanah Day	attended "only a few days at the beginning of the session"
Cumberland	John Sessions	
Cumberland	Micah Townsend	did not attend the 3rd session
Dutchess	Egbert Benson*	also New York State Attorney General
Dutchess	Dirck Brinckerhoff*	
Dutchess	Ananias Cooper	
Dutchess	Samuel Dodge*	
Dutchess	Henry Ludington	
Dutchess	Brinton Paine	
Dutchess	Nathaniel Sacket	
Gloucester	none	No election returns from this county
Kings	William Boerum*	holding over on appointment by Constitutional Convention
Kings	Henry Williams*	holding over on appointment by Constitutional Convention
New York	Evert Bancker*	holding over on appointment by Constitutional Convention; elected Speaker
New York	John Berrien*	holding over on appointment by the State Senate
New York	Abraham Brasher*	holding over on appointment by Constitutional Convention
New York	Daniel Dunscomb*	holding over on appointment by Constitutional Convention
New York	Robert Harpur*	holding over on appointment by Constitutional Convention
New York	Frederick Jay*	holding over on appointment by Constitutional Convention
New York	Abraham P. Lott*	holding over on appointment by Constitutional Convention
New York	Jacobus Van Zandt*	holding over on appointment by Constitutional Convention
New York	Peter P. Van Zandt*	holding over on appointment by Constitutional Convention
Orange	John Coe	
Orange	John Hathorn	
Orange	Thomas Moffat	
Orange	Bezaleel Seely Jr.	
Queens	Benjamin Birdsall*	holding over on appointment by Constitutional Convention
Queens	Benjamin Coe*	holding over on appointment by Constitutional Convention
Queens	Philip Edsall*	holding over on appointment by Constitutional Convention
Queens	Daniel Lawrence*	holding over on appointment by Constitutional Convention
Richmond	Joshua Mersereau*	holding over on appointment by Constitutional Convention
Richmond	vacant	
Suffolk	David Gelston*	holding over on appointment by Constitutional Convention
Suffolk	Ezra L'Hommedieu*	holding over on appointment by Constitutional Convention
Suffolk	Burnet Miller*	holding over on appointment by Constitutional Convention
Suffolk	Thomas Tredwell*	holding over on appointment by Constitutional Convention
Suffolk	Thomas Wickes*	holding over on appointment by Constitutional Convention
Tryon	Abraham Copeman	
Tryon	Peter S. Deygart	
Tryon	Frederick Fox	
Tryon	Jacob Gardenier	
Tryon	Melkert Van Deuzen	
Tryon	Peter Waggoner Jr.	
Ulster	Robert Boyd Jr.	
Ulster	John Cantine	
Ulster	Johannes G. Hardenbergh	
Ulster	Thomas Palmer	
Ulster	Cornelius C. Schoonmaker*	
Ulster	Nathan Smith*	
Westchester	Samuel Drake	
Westchester	Abijah Gilbert	
Westchester	Zebediah Mills*	
Westchester	William Paulding	
Westchester	Philip Pell Jr.	
Westchester	Ebenezer Purdy	

=== Employees ===
- Clerk: John McKesson
- Sergeant-at-Arms: John Tillman Jr.
- Doorkeeper: Richard Ten Eyck

== Sources ==
- The New York Civil List compiled by Franklin Benjamin Hough (Weed, Parsons and Co., 1858) [see pg. 108 for Senate districts; pg. 111 for senators; pg. 148f for Assembly districts; pg. 158f for assemblymen]
