= 2nd New York State Legislature =

New York state legislative session

←	1st	3rd	→
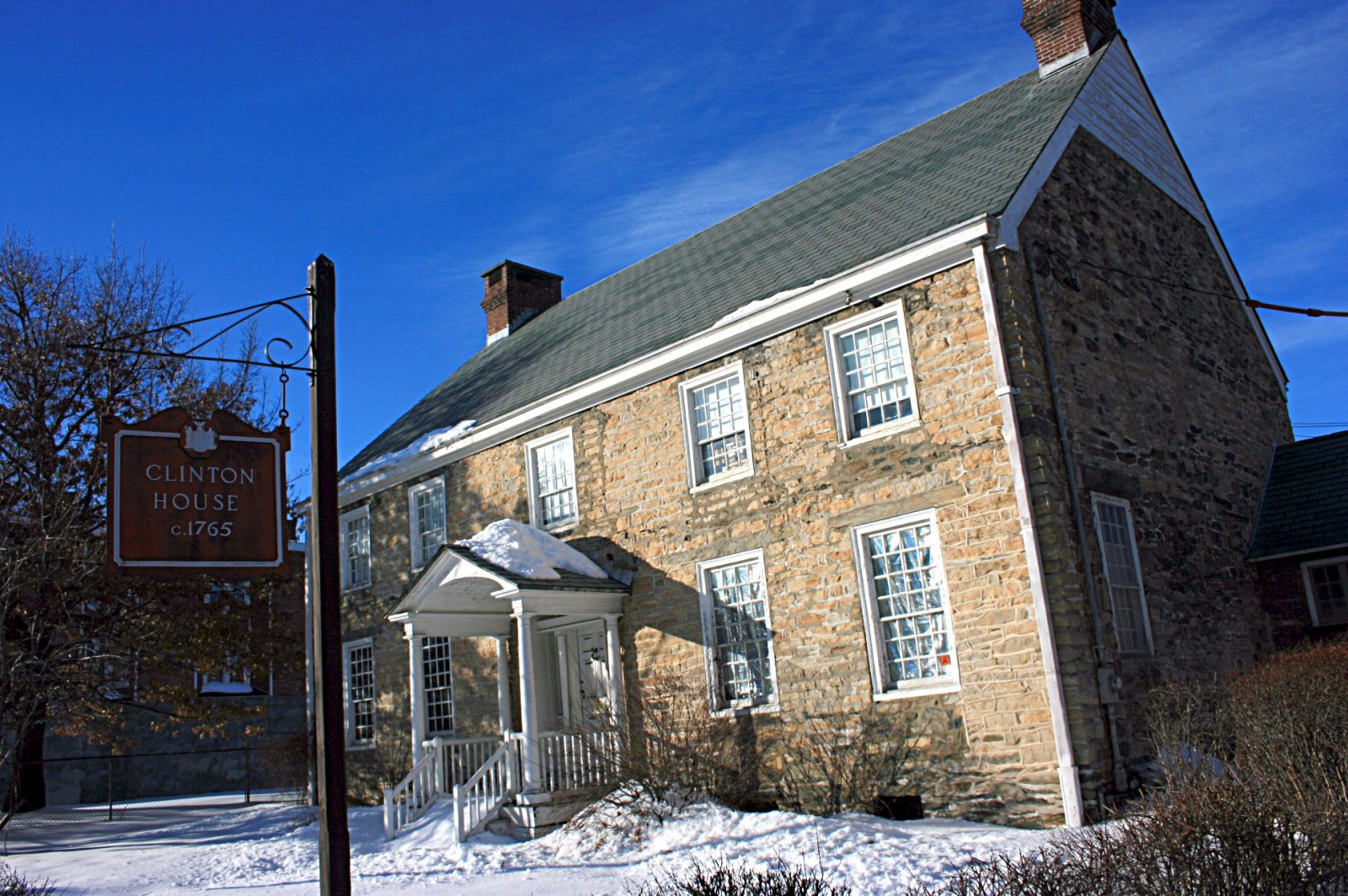
- Clinton House, one of the buildings used by the State government during sessions at Poughkeepsie (2007)

Overview
- Legislative body: New York State Legislature
- Jurisdiction: New York, United States
- Term: July 1, 1778 – June 30, 1779

Senate
- Members: 24
- President: Lt. Gov. Pierre Van Cortlandt

Assembly
- Members: 70 (de facto 65)
- Speaker: Walter Livingston

Sessions
- 1st: October 13 – November 6, 1778
- 2nd: January 27 – March 17, 1779

The 2nd New York State Legislature, consisting of the New York State Senate and the New York State Assembly, met from October 13, 1778, to March 17, 1779, during the second year of George Clinton's governorship, at Poughkeepsie.

== Background ==
Under the provisions of the New York Constitution of 1777, the State Senators were elected on general tickets in the senatorial districts, and were then divided into four classes. Six senators each drew lots for a term of 1, 2, 3 or 4 years and, beginning at the election in April 1778, every year six Senate seats came up for election to a four-year term. Assemblymen were elected countywide on general tickets to a one-year term, the whole assembly being renewed annually.

On May 8, 1777, the Constitutional Convention had appointed the senators from the Southern District, and the assemblymen from Kings, New York, Queens, Richmond and Suffolk counties—the area which was under British control—and determined that these appointees serve in the Legislature until elections could be held in those areas, presumably after the end of the American Revolutionary War. Vacancies among the appointed members in the Senate should be filled by the Assembly, and vacancies in the Assembly by the Senate.

== Elections ==
The State elections were held from April 28 to 30, 1778. Under the determination by the Constitutional Convention, the senators Isaac Roosevelt and John Morin Scott, whose seats were up for election, continued in office, as well as the assemblymen from Kings, New York, Queens, Richmond and Suffolk counties. Two vacancies in the Senate—caused by the death of Philip Livingston and the election of Pierre Van Cortlandt as Lieutenant Governor—were filled by the State Assembly. Henry Wisner (Middle D.) and Abraham Yates Jr. (Western D.) were re-elected. Assemblymen Ebenezer Russell (Eastern D.) and Jacob G. Klock (Western D.) were elected to the Senate.

The State Legislature met in Poughkeepsie, the seat of Dutchess County, on October 13, 1778, and adjourned on November 6. The Senate reconvened from January 27 to March 17, the Assembly from January 28 to March 16, 1779. Due to the difficult situation during the American Revolutionary War, four senators and several assemblymen could not attend the meeting.

== State Senate ==
=== Districts ===
- The Southern District (9 seats) consisted of Kings, New York, Queens, Richmond, Suffolk and Westchester counties.
- The Middle District (6 seats) consisted of Dutchess, Orange and Ulster counties.
- The Eastern District (3 seats) consisted of Charlotte, Cumberland and Gloucester counties.
- The Western District (6 seats) consisted of Albany and Tryon counties.
Note: There are now 62 counties in the State of New York. The counties which are not mentioned in this list had not yet been established, or sufficiently organized, the area being included in one or more of the abovementioned counties. In 1784, Charlotte Co. was renamed Washington Co., and Tryon Co. was renamed Montgomery Co.

=== Senators ===
The asterisk (*) denotes members of the previous Legislature who continued in office as members of this Legislature. Ebenezer Russell and Jacob G. Klock changed from the Assembly to the Senate.

District	Senators	Term left	Notes
Southern	Jonathan Lawrence*	1 year	appointed by Constitutional Convention; elected to the Council of Appointment
Southern	Lewis Morris*	1 year	appointed by Constitutional Convention
Southern	Richard Morris*	1 year	appointed by State Assembly
Southern	William Floyd*	2 years	appointed by Constitutional Convention
Southern	William Smith*	2 years	appointed by Constitutional Convention
Southern	Isaac Stoutenburgh	2 years	appointed by State Assembly on October 18, 1778, to fill vacancy, in place of Pierre Van Cortlandt
Southern	Sir James Jay	3 years	appointed by State Assembly on October 7, 1778, to fill vacancy, in place of Philip Livingston
Southern	Isaac Roosevelt*	4 years	holding over on appointment by Constitutional Convention
Southern	John Morin Scott*	4 years	holding over on appointment by Constitutional Convention; also Secretary of State of New York
Middle	Jonathan Landon*	1 year	
Middle	Zephaniah Platt*	1 year	elected to the Council of Appointment
Middle	Arthur Parks*	2 years	
Middle	Levi Pawling*	3 years	
Middle	Jesse Woodhull*	3 years	
Middle	Henry Wisner*	4 years	
Eastern	John Williams*	2 years	expelled on February 8, 1779
Eastern	Alexander Webster*	3 years	
Eastern	Ebenezer Russell*	4 years	elected to the Council of Appointment
Western	Dirck W. Ten Broeck*	1 year	elected to the Council of Appointment
Western	Anthony Van Schaick*	2 years	
Western	Jellis Fonda*	3 years	
Western	Rinier Mynderse*	3 years	
Western	Jacob G. Klock*	4 years	
Western	Abraham Yates Jr.*	4 years	

=== Employees ===
- Clerk: Robert Benson

== State Assembly ==
=== Districts ===
- The City and County of Albany (10 seats)
- Charlotte County (4 seats)
- Cumberland County (3 seats)
- Dutchess County (7 seats)
- Gloucester County (2 seats)
- Kings County (2 seats)
- The City and County of New York (9 seats)
- Orange County (4 seats)
- Queens County (4 seats)
- Richmond County (2 seats)
- Suffolk County (5 seats)
- Tryon County (6 seats)
- Ulster County (6 seats)
- Westchester County (6 seats)
Note: There are now 62 counties in the State of New York. The counties which are not mentioned in this list had not yet been established, or sufficiently organized, the area being included in one or more of the abovementioned counties. In 1784, Charlotte Co. was renamed Washington Co., and Tryon Co. was renamed Montgomery Co.

=== Assemblymen ===
The asterisk (*) denotes members of the previous Legislature who continued as members of this Legislature.

County	Assemblymen	Notes
Albany	Leonard Gansevoort	
Albany	James Gordon*	
Albany	Walter Livingston*	re-elected Speaker
Albany	Stephen J. Schuyler*	
Albany	John Tayler*	
Albany	Jacobus Teller	
Albany	Killian Van Rensselaer*	
Albany	Robert Van Rensselaer*	
Albany	Peter Vrooman*	
Albany	William B. Whiting*	
Charlotte	Albert Baker	
Charlotte	Ebenezer Clarke*	
Charlotte	David Hopkins	
Charlotte	Elishama Tozer	unsuccessfully contested by John Rowan
Cumberland	none	No election returns from these counties
Gloucester	none	No election returns from these counties
Dutchess	Egbert Benson*	also New York State Attorney General
Dutchess	Dirck Brinckerhoff*	
Dutchess	Joseph Crane Jr.	
Dutchess	Samuel Dodge	
Dutchess	Anthony Hoffman*	
Dutchess	Andrew Moorhouse*	
Dutchess	Jacobus Swartwout*	
Kings	William Boerum*	holding over on appointment by Constitutional Convention
Kings	Henry Williams*	holding over on appointment by Constitutional Convention
New York	Evert Bancker*	holding over on appointment by Constitutional Convention
New York	John Berrien*	holding over on appointment by the State Senate
New York	Abraham Brasher*	holding over on appointment by Constitutional Convention
New York	Daniel Dunscomb*	holding over on appointment by Constitutional Convention
New York	Robert Harpur*	holding over on appointment by Constitutional Convention
New York	Frederick Jay*	holding over on appointment by Constitutional Convention
New York	Abraham P. Lott*	holding over on appointment by Constitutional Convention
New York	Jacobus Van Zandt*	holding over on appointment by Constitutional Convention
New York	Peter P. Van Zandt*	holding over on appointment by Constitutional Convention
Orange	Jeremiah Clark*	
Orange	Benjamin Coe	
Orange	Peter Ogilvie	
Orange	Roeluf Van Houten*	
Queens	Benjamin Birdsall*	holding over on appointment by Constitutional Convention
Queens	Benjamin Coe*	holding over on appointment by Constitutional Convention
Queens	Philip Edsall*	holding over on appointment by Constitutional Convention
Queens	Daniel Lawrence*	holding over on appointment by Constitutional Convention
Richmond	Joshua Mersereau*	holding over on appointment by Constitutional Convention
Richmond	vacant	
Suffolk	David Gelston*	holding over on appointment by Constitutional Convention
Suffolk	Ezra L'Hommedieu*	holding over on appointment by Constitutional Convention
Suffolk	Burnet Miller*	holding over on appointment by Constitutional Convention
Suffolk	Thomas Tredwell*	holding over on appointment by Constitutional Convention
Suffolk	Thomas Wickes*	holding over on appointment by Constitutional Convention
Tryon	George Henry Bell	
Tryon	John Newkirk	
Tryon	Abraham Van Horne*	
Tryon	Peter Waggoner	
Tryon	Moses Younglove	
Tryon	vacant	
Ulster	Andries Bevier	unsuccessfully contested by Thomas Palmer
Ulster	Matthew Rea*	
Ulster	Cornelius C. Schoonmaker*	
Ulster	Nathan Smith	
Ulster	Johannis Snyder*	
Ulster	vacant	
Westchester	Joseph Benedict	
Westchester	Thaddeus Crane*	
Westchester	Israel Honeywell Jr.*	
Westchester	Ebenezer Lockwood	
Westchester	Zebediah Mills*	
Westchester	Stephen Ward	

=== Employees ===
- Clerk: John McKesson
- Sergeant-at-Arms: Stephen Hendrickson
- Doorkeeper: Richard Ten Eyck

== Sources ==
- The New York Civil List compiled by Franklin Benjamin Hough (Weed, Parsons and Co., 1858) [see pg. 108 for Senate districts; pg. 110 for senators; pg. 148f for Assembly districts; pg. 157f for assemblymen]
