= 1st New York State Legislature =

New York state legislative session

←	State Constitutional Convention	2nd	→
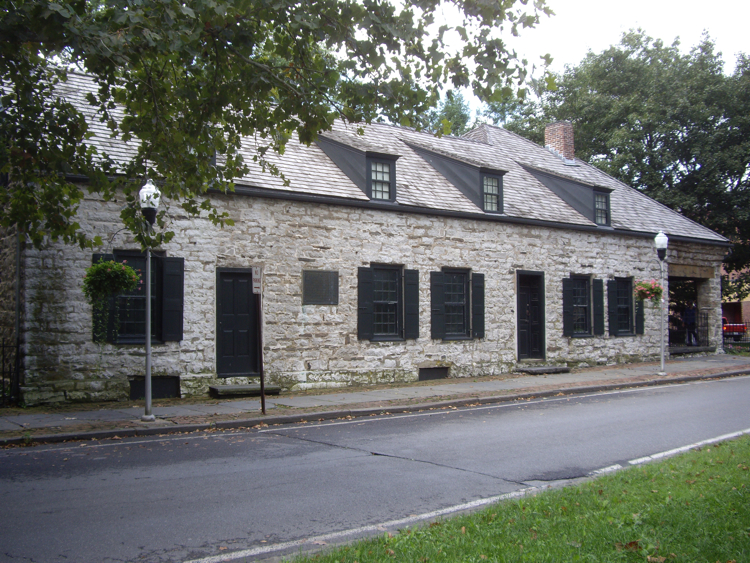
- Senate House, Kingston, the place of the first session of the State Senate (2007)

Overview
- Legislative body: New York State Legislature
- Jurisdiction: New York, United States
- Term: September 9, 1777 – June 30, 1778

Senate
- Members: 24
- President: vacant
- Temporary President: Pierre Van Cortlandt

Assembly
- Members: 70 (de facto 65)
- Speaker: Walter Livingston

Sessions
- 1st: September 1, 1777 – October 7, 1778
- 2nd: January 5, 1778 – April 4, 1778
- 3rd: June 22, 1778 – June 30, 1778

The 1st New York State Legislature, consisting of the New York State Senate and the New York State Assembly, met from September 9, 1777, to June 30, 1778, during the first year of George Clinton's governorship, first at Kingston and later at Poughkeepsie.

== Background ==
The 4th Provincial Congress of the Colony of New York convened at White Plains on July 9, 1776, and declared the independence of the State of New York. The next day the delegates re-convened as the "Convention of Representatives of the State of New-York" and on August 1 a committee was appointed to prepare a State Constitution. The New York Constitution was adopted by the Convention on April 20, 1777, and went into force immediately, without ratification by popular vote.

== Apportionment and election ==
The State Senators were elected on general tickets in the senatorial districts, and were then divided into four classes. Six senators each drew lots for a term of 1, 2, 3 or 4 years and, beginning at the following election in April 1778, every year one fourth of the State Senate seats came up for election to a four-year term.

Assemblymen were elected countywide on general tickets to a one-year term, the whole assembly being renewed annually.

On May 8, 1777, the Constitutional Convention appointed the senators from the Southern District, and the assemblymen from Kings, New York, Queens, Richmond and Suffolk counties—the area which was under British control—and determined that these appointees serve in the Legislature until elections could be held in those areas, presumably after the end of the American Revolutionary War. Vacancies among the appointed members in the Senate should be filled by the Assembly, and vacancies in the Assembly by the Senate.

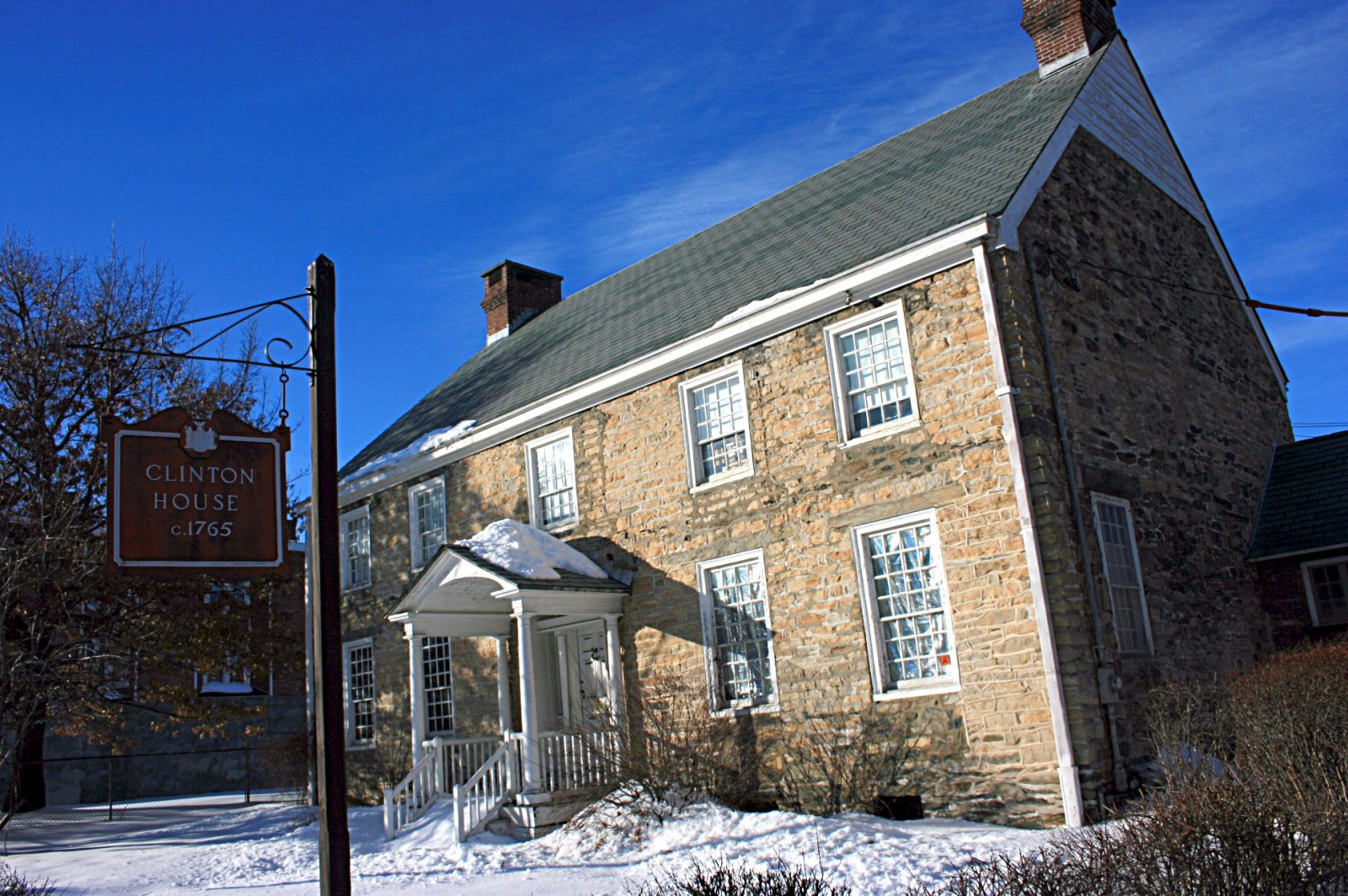
Clinton House, one of the buildings used by the State government during sessions at Poughkeepsie

== Sessions ==
The State Legislature met in Kingston, the seat of Ulster County. The State Senate met first on September 9, 1777, at the home of Abraham Van Gaasbeck, now known as Senate House, the Assembly met first on the next day at the Bogardus Tavern. At the approach of the British army, the State Legislature dispersed on October 7, and reconvened in Poughkeepsie on January 5, 1778, possibly at a house now known as Clinton House.

== State Senate ==
=== Districts ===
- The Southern District (9 seats) consisted of Kings, New York, Queens, Richmond, Suffolk and Westchester counties.
- The Middle District (6 seats) consisted of Dutchess, Orange and Ulster counties.
- The Eastern District (3 seats) consisted of Charlotte, Cumberland and Gloucester counties.
- The Western District (6 seats) consisted of Albany and Tryon counties.
Note: There are now 62 counties in the State of New York. The counties which are not mentioned in this list had not yet been established, or sufficiently organized, the area being included in one or more of the abovementioned counties. In 1784, Charlotte Co. was renamed Washington Co., and Tryon Co. was renamed Montgomery Co.

=== Senators ===
The asterisk (*) denotes members of the Constitutional Convention who continued as members of the Legislature.

District	image	State Senators	Term drawn	Notes
Southern		Isaac Roosevelt*	1 year	appointed by Constitutional Convention
Southern		John Morin Scott*	1 year	appointed by Constitutional Convention; elected to the Council of Appointment; from March 13, 1778, also Secretary of State of New York
Southern		John Jones	2 years	appointed by Constitutional Convention; resigned on February 26, 1778, due to ill health
Southern		Richard Morris	2 years	on March 4, 1778, appointed by the State Assembly, in place of Jones
Southern		Jonathan Lawrence*	2 years	appointed by Constitutional Convention
Southern		Lewis Morris*	2 years	appointed by Constitutional Convention
Southern		William Floyd	3 years	appointed by Constitutional Convention
Southern		William Smith*	3 years	appointed by Constitutional Convention
Southern		Pierre Van Cortlandt*	3 years	appointed by Constitutional Convention; elected Temporary President of the State Senate; then elected Lt. Gov. to fill vacancy, and took office on June 30, 1778
Southern		Philip Livingston*	4 years	appointed by Constitutional Convention; died June 12, 1778
Middle		Henry Wisner*	1 year	
Middle		Jonathan Landon*	2 years	
Middle		Zephaniah Platt*	2 years	
Middle		Arthur Parks*	3 years	
Middle		Levi Pawling	4 years	
Middle		Jesse Woodhull	4 years	elected to the Council of Appointment
Eastern		William Duer*	1 year	
Eastern		John Williams*	3 years	
Eastern		Alexander Webster*	4 years	elected to the Council of Appointment
Western		Isaac Paris*	1 year	
Western		Abraham Yates Jr.*	1 year	elected to the Council of Appointment
Western		Dirck W. Ten Broeck	2 years	
Western		Anthony Van Schaick	3 years	
Western		Jellis Fonda	4 years	
Western		Rinier Mynderse	4 years	

=== Employees ===
- Clerk: Robert Benson
- Sergeant-at-Arms: Stephen Hendrickson, elected March 11, 1778
- Doorkeeper and Messenger: Victor Bicker

== State Assembly ==
=== Districts ===
- The City and County of Albany (10 seats)
- Charlotte County (4 seats)
- Cumberland County (3 seats)
- Dutchess County (7 seats)
- Gloucester County (2 seats)
- Kings County (2 seats)
- The City and County of New York (9 seats)
- Orange County (4 seats)
- Queens County (4 seats)
- Richmond County (2 seats)
- Suffolk County (5 seats)
- Tryon County (6 seats)
- Ulster County (6 seats)
- Westchester County (6 seats)
Note: There are now 62 counties in the State of New York. The counties which are not mentioned in this list had not yet been established, or sufficiently organized, the area being included in one or more of the abovementioned counties. In 1784, Charlotte Co. was renamed Washington Co., and Tryon Co. was renamed Montgomery Co.

=== Assemblymen ===
The asterisk (*) denotes members of the Constitutional Convention who continued as members of the Legislature.

District	Assemblymen	Notes
Albany	Jacob Cuyler*	resigned September 30, 1777
Albany	John Cuyler Jr.	
Albany	James Gordon	
Albany	Walter Livingston	elected Speaker
Albany	Stephen J. Schuyler	
Albany	John Tayler*	
Albany	Killian Van Rensselaer	
Albany	Robert Van Rensselaer*	
Albany	Peter Vrooman	
Albany	William B. Whiting	
Charlotte	John Barns	
Charlotte	Ebenezer Clarke	
Charlotte	John Rowan	
Charlotte	Ebenezer Russell	
Cumberland	none	No election returns from these counties
Gloucester	none	No election returns from these counties
Dutchess	Egbert Benson	also New York State Attorney General
Dutchess	Dirck Brinckerhoff	
Dutchess	Anthony Hoffman*	
Dutchess	Gilbert Livingston*	
Dutchess	Andrew Moorhouse	
Dutchess	John Schenck*	
Dutchess	Jacobus Swartwout	
Kings	William Boerum	appointed by Constitutional Convention
Kings	Henry Williams	appointed by Constitutional Convention
New York	Evert Bancker*	appointed by Constitutional Convention
New York	Abraham Brasher*	appointed by Constitutional Convention
New York	Daniel Dunscomb*	appointed by Constitutional Convention
New York	Robert Harpur*	appointed by Constitutional Convention
New York	Frederick Jay	appointed by Constitutional Convention
New York	Abraham P. Lott*	appointed by Constitutional Convention
New York	Henry Rutgers	appointed by Constitutional Convention; resigned on February 16, 1778
New York	John Berrien	appointed by the State Senate, in place of Rutgers
New York	Jacobus Van Zandt*	appointed by Constitutional Convention
New York	Peter P. Van Zandt*	appointed by Constitutional Convention
Orange	Jeremiah Clark*	
Orange	John Hathorn	
Orange	Theunis Cuyper	
Orange	Roeluf Van Houten	
Queens	Benjamin Birdsall	appointed by Constitutional Convention
Queens	Benjamin Coe	appointed by Constitutional Convention
Queens	Philip Edsall	appointed by Constitutional Convention
Queens	Daniel Lawrence	appointed by Constitutional Convention
Richmond	Abraham Jones	appointed by Constitutional Convention; seat declared vacant on June 8, 1778, for "being with the enemy"
Richmond	Joshua Mersereau	appointed by Constitutional Convention
Suffolk	David Gelston*	appointed by Constitutional Convention
Suffolk	Ezra L'Hommedieu*	appointed by Constitutional Convention
Suffolk	Burnet Miller*	appointed by Constitutional Convention
Suffolk	Thomas Tredwell*	appointed by Constitutional Convention
Suffolk	Thomas Wickes	appointed by Constitutional Convention
Tryon	Samuel Clyde	
Tryon	Michael Edie	
Tryon	Jacob G. Klock	
Tryon	Jacob Snell	
Tryon	Abraham Van Horne	
Tryon	Johannes Veeder	
Ulster	John Cantine	
Ulster	Johannes G. Hardenbergh*	
Ulster	Matthew Rea*	
Ulster	Cornelius C. Schoonmaker	
Ulster	Johannis Snyder	
Ulster	Henry Wisner Jr.*	
Westchester	Thaddeus Crane	
Westchester	Samuel Drake	
Westchester	Robert Graham	
Westchester	Israel Honeywell Jr.	
Westchester	Zebediah Mills*	
Westchester	Gouverneur Morris*	

=== Employees ===
- Clerk: John McKesson
- Sergeant-at-Arms: Thomas Pettit
- Doorkeeper: Richard Ten Eyck

== Sources ==
- The New York Civil List compiled by Franklin Benjamin Hough (Weed, Parsons and Co., 1858) [see pg. 48-52 for Constitutional Convention; pg. 108 for Senate districts; pg. 110 for senators; pg. 148f for Assembly districts; pg. 157 for assemblymen]
