= 4th New York State Legislature =

New York state legislative session

←	3rd	5th	→
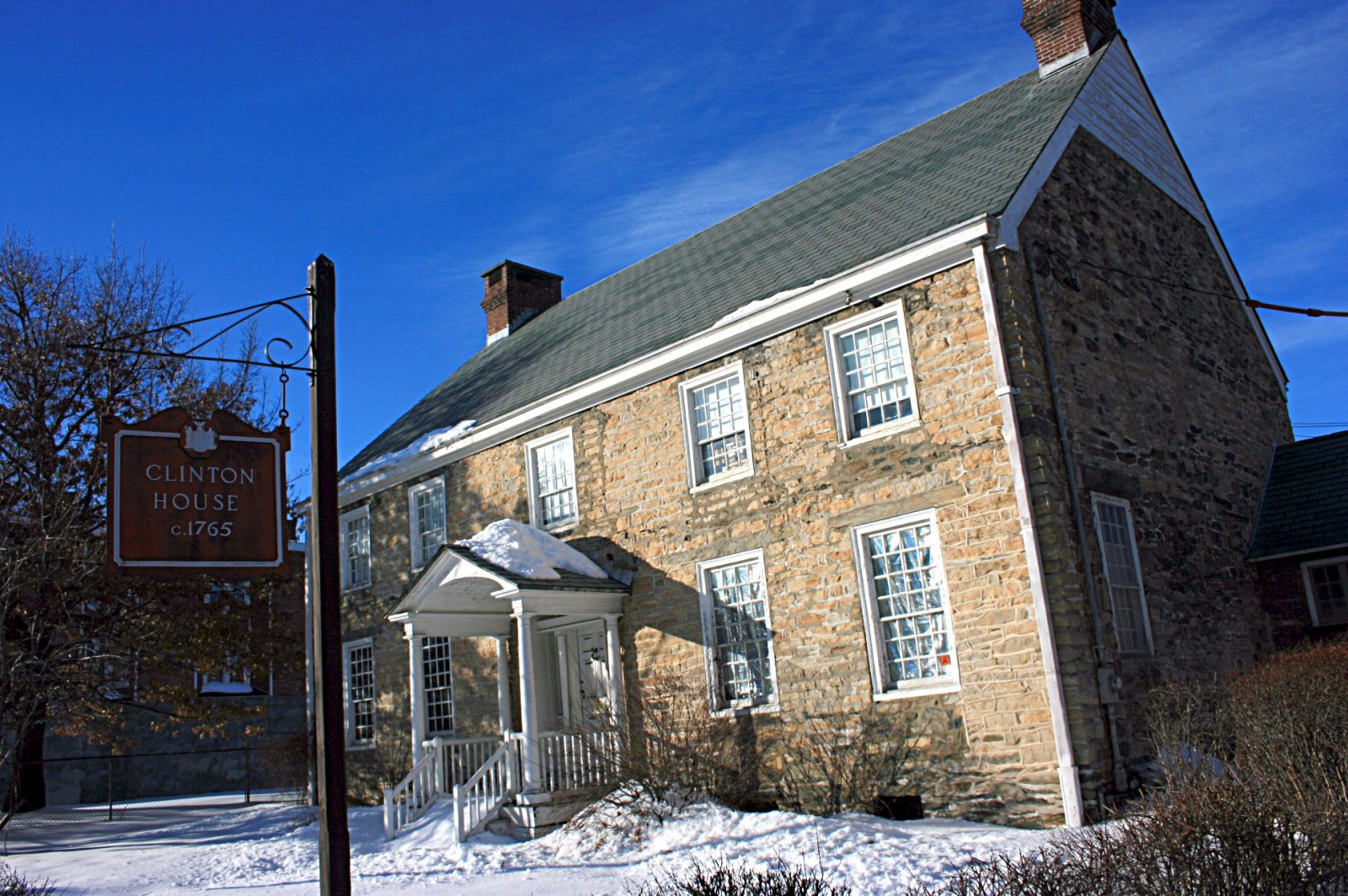
- Clinton House, Poughkeepsie (2007)

Overview
- Legislative body: New York State Legislature
- Jurisdiction: New York, United States
- Term: July 2, 1780 – July 1, 1781

Senate
- Members: 24
- President: {{{vp}}}

Assembly
- Members: 70 (de facto 65)
- Speaker: Evert Bancker

Sessions
- 1st: September 7 – October 10, 1780
- 2nd: January 17 – March 31, 1781
- 3rd: June 15 – July 1, 1781

The 4th New York State Legislature, consisting of the New York State Senate and the New York State Assembly, met from September 7, 1780, to July 1, 1781, during the fourth year of George Clinton's governorship, first at Poughkeepsie, then at Albany, and finally at Poughkeepsie again.

== Background ==
Under the provisions of the New York Constitution of 1777, the State Senators were elected on general tickets in the senatorial districts, and were then divided into four classes. Six senators each drew lots for a term of 1, 2, 3 or 4 years and, beginning at the election in April 1778, every year six Senate seats came up for election to a four-year term. Assemblymen were elected countywide on general tickets to a one-year term, the whole assembly being renewed annually.

On May 8, 1777, the Constitutional Convention had appointed the senators from the Southern District, and the assemblymen from Kings, New York, Queens, Richmond and Suffolk counties—the area which was under British control—and determined that these appointees serve in the Legislature until elections could be held in those areas, presumably after the end of the American Revolutionary War. Vacancies among the appointed members in the Senate should be filled by the Assembly, and vacancies in the Assembly by the Senate.

== Elections ==
The State elections were held from April 25 to 27, 1780. Gov. George Clinton and Lt. Gov. Pierre Van Cortlandt were re-elected. Under the determination by the Constitutional Convention, the senators William Floyd, William Smith and Isaac Stoutenburgh, whose seats were up for election, continued in office, as well as the assemblymen from Kings, New York, Queens, Richmond and Suffolk counties. Arthur Parks (Middle D.) was re-elected. Philip Schuyler was elected in the Western District. Assemblyman Elkanah Day, from Cumberland County, which had seceded from New York to become a part of the Vermont Republic, was elected in the Eastern District.

== Sessions ==
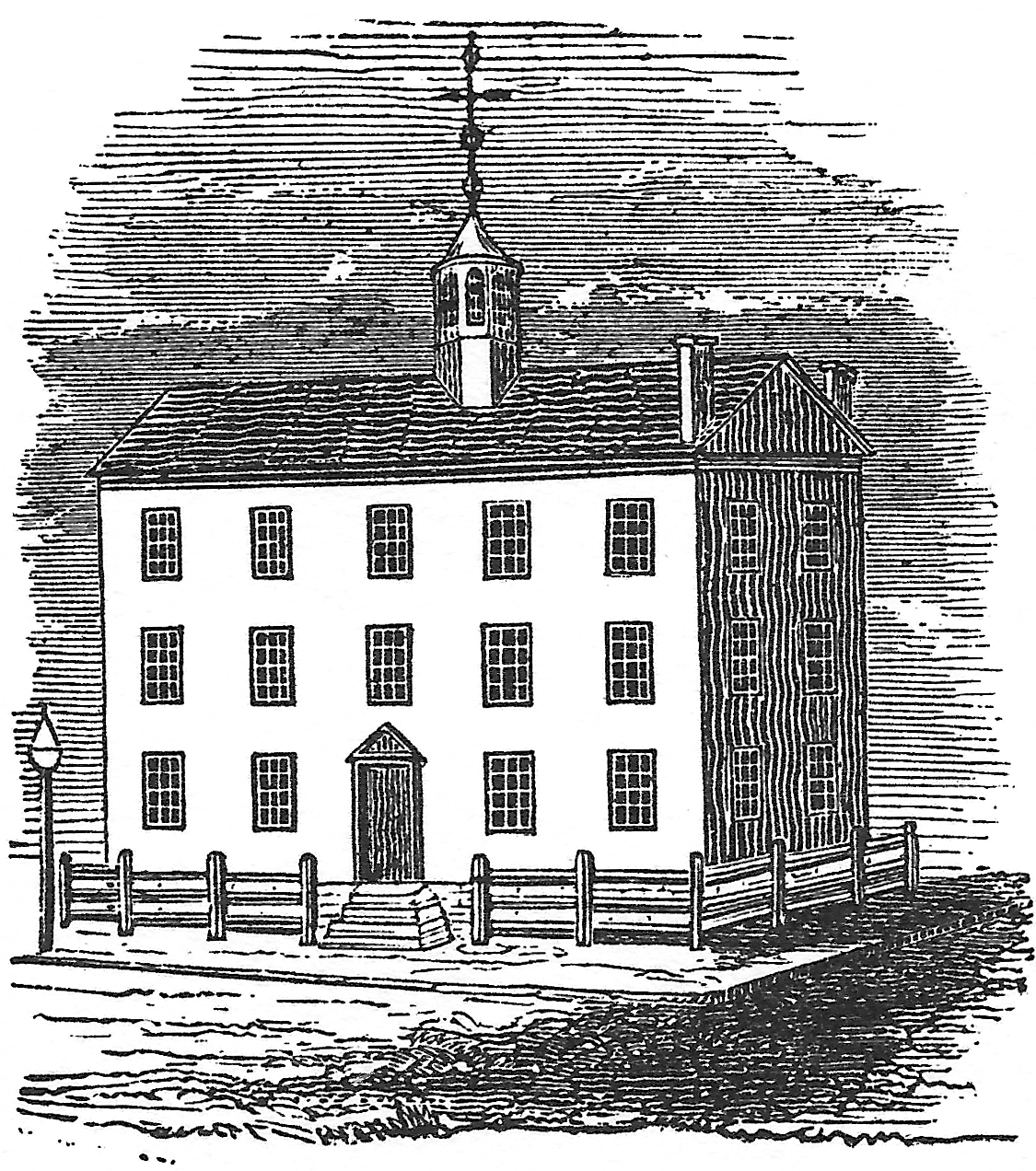
The Old Albany City Hall

The State Legislature met first in Poughkeepsie, the seat of Dutchess County, on September 7, 1780, and adjourned on October 10. The Legislature reconvened at the Old City Hall in Albany, the seat of Albany County, on January 17, 1781, and adjourned on March 31. The Legislature reconvened again in Poughkeepsie, the Senate on June 15, the Assembly on June 18, and adjourned finally on July 1.

== State Senate ==
=== Districts ===
- The Southern District (9 seats) consisted of Kings, New York, Queens, Richmond, Suffolk and Westchester counties.
- The Middle District (6 seats) consisted of Dutchess, Orange and Ulster counties.
- The Eastern District (3 seats) consisted of Charlotte, Cumberland and Gloucester counties.
- The Western District (6 seats) consisted of Albany and Tryon counties.
Note: There are now 62 counties in the State of New York. The counties which are not mentioned in this list had not yet been established, or sufficiently organized, the area being included in one or more of the abovementioned counties. In 1784, Charlotte Co. was renamed Washington Co., and Tryon Co. was renamed Montgomery Co.

=== Senators ===
The asterisk (*) denotes members of the previous Legislature who continued in office as members of this Legislature. Elkanah Day changed from the Assembly to the Senate, but never took his seat.

District	Senators	Term left	Notes
Southern	Sir James Jay*	1 year	appointed by State Assembly
Southern	Isaac Roosevelt*	2 years	holding over on appointment by Constitutional Convention
Southern	John Morin Scott*	2 years	holding over on appointment by Constitutional Convention; also Secretary of State of New York
Southern	Jonathan Lawrence*	3 years	holding over on appointment by Constitutional Convention
Southern	Lewis Morris*	3 years	holding over on appointment by Constitutional Convention
Southern	Stephen Ward*	3 years	appointed by State Assembly; elected to the Council of Appointment
Southern	William Floyd*	4 years	holding over on appointment by Constitutional Convention
Southern	William Smith*	4 years	holding over on appointment by Constitutional Convention
Southern	Isaac Stoutenburgh*	4 years	holding over on appointment by State Assembly
Middle	Levi Pawling*	1 year	
Middle	Jesse Woodhull*	1 year	
Middle	Henry Wisner*	2 years	
Middle	Ephraim Paine*	3 years	elected to the Council of Appointment; expelled on March 15, 1781, for "neglect of duty"
Middle	Zephaniah Platt*	3 years	
Middle	Arthur Parks*	4 years	elected to the Council of Appointment to fill vacancy, in place of Ephraim Paine
Eastern	Alexander Webster*	1 year	
Eastern	Ebenezer Russell*	2 years	elected to the Council of Appointment
Eastern	(Elkanah Day)*	4 years	did not attend
Western	Jellis Fonda*	1 year	
Western	Rinier Mynderse*	1 year	
Western	Jacob G. Klock*	2 years	
Western	Abraham Yates Jr.*	2 years	
Western	Abraham Ten Broeck	3 years	also Mayor of Albany; elected to the Council of Appointment
Western	Philip Schuyler	4 years	from March 30, 1781, also New York State Surveyor General

=== Employees ===
- Clerk: Robert Benson

== State Assembly ==
=== Districts ===
- The City and County of Albany (10 seats)
- Charlotte County (4 seats)
- Cumberland County (3 seats)
- Dutchess County (7 seats)
- Gloucester County (2 seats)
- Kings County (2 seats)
- The City and County of New York (9 seats)
- Orange County (4 seats)
- Queens County (4 seats)
- Richmond County (2 seats)
- Suffolk County (5 seats)
- Tryon County (6 seats)
- Ulster County (6 seats)
- Westchester County (6 seats)
Note: There are now 62 counties in the State of New York. The counties which are not mentioned in this list had not yet been established, or sufficiently organized, the area being included in one or more of the abovementioned counties. In 1784, Charlotte Co. was renamed Washington Co., and Tryon Co. was renamed Montgomery Co.

=== Assemblymen ===
The asterisk (*) denotes members of the previous Legislature who continued as members of this Legislature.

County	Assemblymen	Notes
Albany	Matthew Adgate	
Albany	John Ja. Beekman	
Albany	James Gordon*	
Albany	John Lansing Jr.	
Albany	Peter R. Livingston	
Albany	Dirck Swart	
Albany	John Tayler	
Albany	John Van Rensselaer Jr.	
Albany	Robert Van Rensselaer	
Albany	Isaac Vrooman*	
Charlotte	David Hopkins*	
Charlotte	Hamilton McCollister	
Charlotte	Matthew McWhorter	
Charlotte	Ichabod Parker	
Cumberland	none	
Dutchess	Egbert Benson*	also New York State Attorney General
Dutchess	Ebenezer Cary	
Dutchess	Samuel Dodge*	
Dutchess	Henry Ludington*	
Dutchess	Brinton Paine*	
Dutchess	Guisbert Schenck	
Dutchess	Jacobus Swartwout	
Gloucester	none	No election returns from this county
Kings	William Boerum*	holding over on appointment by Constitutional Convention
Kings	Henry Williams*	holding over on appointment by Constitutional Convention
New York	Evert Bancker*	holding over on appointment by Constitutional Convention; re-elected Speaker
New York	John Berrien*	holding over on appointment by the State Senate
New York	Abraham Brasher*	holding over on appointment by Constitutional Convention
New York	Daniel Dunscomb*	holding over on appointment by Constitutional Convention
New York	Robert Harpur*	holding over on appointment by Constitutional Convention
New York	Frederick Jay*	holding over on appointment by Constitutional Convention
New York	Abraham P. Lott*	holding over on appointment by Constitutional Convention
New York	Jacobus Van Zandt*	holding over on appointment by Constitutional Convention
New York	Peter P. Van Zandt*	holding over on appointment by Constitutional Convention
Orange	Jeremiah Clark	
Orange	David Pye	
Orange	Bezaleel Seely*?	
Orange	John Stagg	
Queens	Benjamin Birdsall*	holding over on appointment by Constitutional Convention
Queens	Benjamin Coe*	holding over on appointment by Constitutional Convention
Queens	Philip Edsall*	holding over on appointment by Constitutional Convention
Queens	Daniel Lawrence*	holding over on appointment by Constitutional Convention
Richmond	Joshua Mersereau*	holding over on appointment by Constitutional Convention
Richmond	vacant	
Suffolk	David Gelston*	holding over on appointment by Constitutional Convention
Suffolk	Ezra L'Hommedieu*	holding over on appointment by Constitutional Convention
Suffolk	Burnet Miller*	holding over on appointment by Constitutional Convention
Suffolk	Thomas Tredwell*	holding over on appointment by Constitutional Convention
Suffolk	Thomas Wickes*	holding over on appointment by Constitutional Convention
Tryon	Zephaniah Batchelor	
Tryon	Jacob Gardenier*	
Tryon	Abraham Garrison	
Tryon	John Moore	
Tryon	Abraham Van Horne	
Tryon	Peter Waggoner Jr.*	
Ulster	Robert Boyd Jr.*	
Ulster	John Cantine*	
Ulster	Cornelius C. Schoonmaker*	
Ulster	Nathan Smith*	
Ulster	Dirck Wynkoop	
Ulster	vacant	
Westchester	Samuel Drake*	
Westchester	Philip Pell*	
Westchester	Nathan Rockwell	
Westchester	Joseph Strang	
Westchester	Thomas Thomas	
Westchester	Jonathan G. Tompkins	

=== Employees ===
- Clerk: John McKesson

== Sources ==
- The New York Civil List compiled by Franklin Benjamin Hough (Weed, Parsons and Co., 1858) [see pg. 108 for Senate districts; pg. 111 for senators; pg. 148f for Assembly districts; pg. 159f for assemblymen]
