= Gideon Granger =

American Postmaster General (1767-1822)

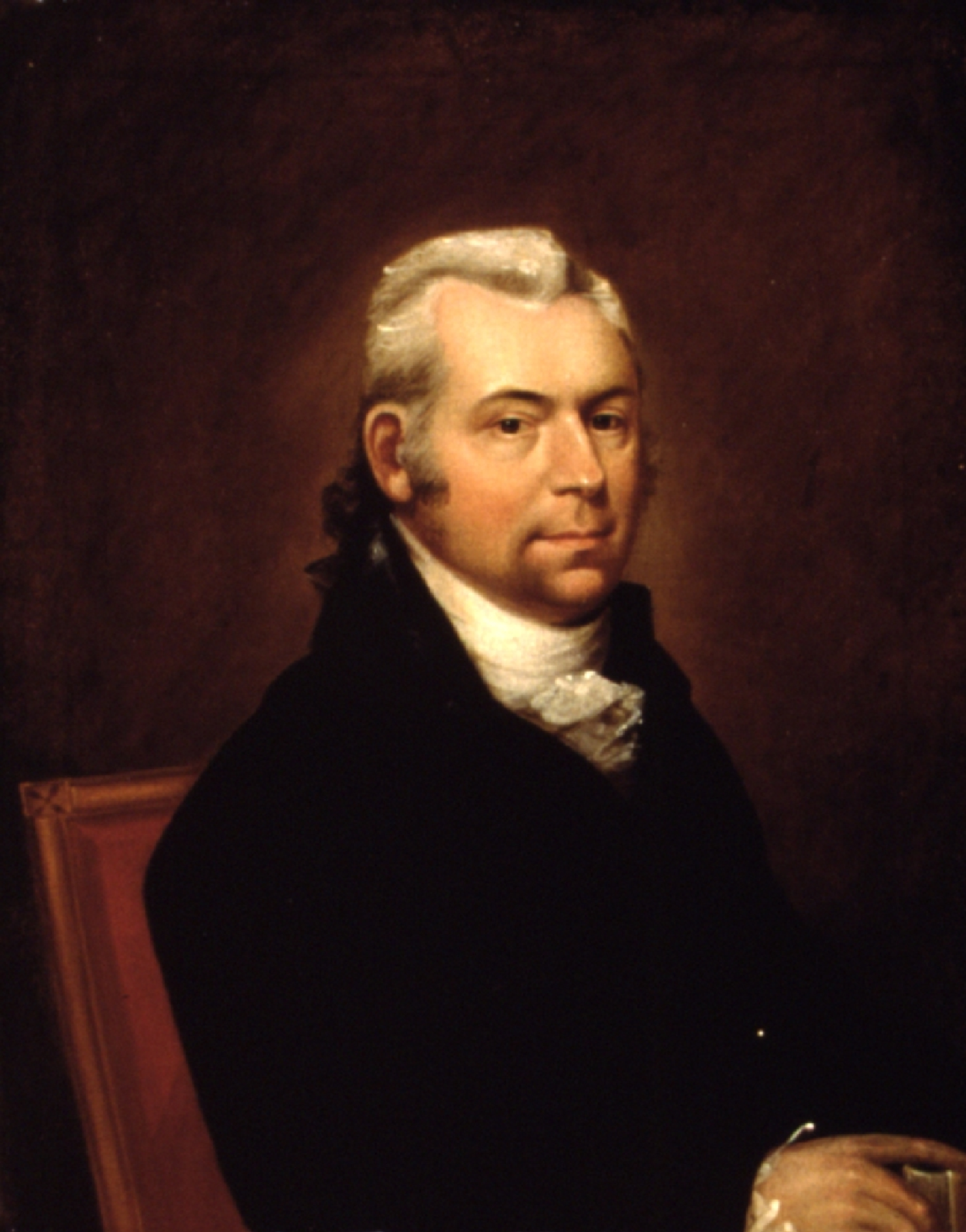

7th United States Postmaster General
- In office November 28, 1801 – March 17, 1814
- President: Thomas Jefferson; James Madison
- Preceded by: Joseph Habersham
- Succeeded by: Return J. Meigs, Jr.

Personal details
- Born: July 19, 1767 Suffield, Connecticut, British America
- Died: December 31, 1822 (aged 55) Canandaigua, New York, U.S.
- Party: Democratic-Republican
- Spouse: Mindwell Pease (m. 1790)
- Children: 3, including Francis
- Education: Yale University (BA)

Gideon Granger (July 19, 1767 – December 31, 1822) was an early American politician and lawyer. He was the father of fellow Postmaster General and U.S. Representative Francis Granger.

== Early life ==
Granger was born in Suffield, Connecticut on July 19, 1767. He was the son of Gideon Granger (1735–1800) and Tryphosia (née Kent) Granger (1738–1796).

He attended and graduated from Yale University and became a lawyer.

== Career ==
Granger was considered a brilliant political essayist. Using the pseudonyms Algernon Sydney and Epaminondas many of his writings, defending Jeffersonian principles, were published in many pamphlets.

He was a member of the Connecticut House of Representatives and ran unsuccessfully for the United States Congress in the 1797 special election for one of Connecticut's at-large congressional seats. A staunch supporter of Thomas Jefferson, Granger was appointed as Postmaster General in the first year of his first term in November 1801. He served in this post until 1814 when Jefferson's successor, James Madison, replaced him. He is the longest serving Postmaster General as of 2025.

After leaving Washington, D.C., Granger settled in Canandaigua, New York, where he built a homestead that would be "unrivaled in all the nation" from which he could administer the many land tracts he had acquired farther to the west. Today his home is a museum. He became a member of the New York Senate and continued to be influential in politics and law including being a key figure in the Erie Canal project.

== Personal life ==
On June 14, 1790, Granger was married to Mindwell Pease (1770–1860), the daughter of Joseph Pease. Together, they were the parents of three sons, including:

- Francis Granger (1792–1868), who married Cornelia Rutsen Van Rensselaer (1798–1823), the granddaughter of Brigadier General Robert Van Rensselaer, who was a member of the New York Provincial Congress from 1775 to 1777 and later a member of the New York State Assembly in the 1st, 2nd and 4th New York State Legislatures.
- John Albert Granger (1795–1870), who married Harriet Jackson (1804–1868), the daughter of Amasa Jackson, the first president of the Union Bank of New York, and Mary (née Phelps) Jackson, the only daughter and heiress of Oliver Phelps. Her paternal grandfather was General Michael Jackson, who commanded a regiment of minutemen in the Battle of Lexington.

Ill health forced him to retire early in 1821 and he died the next year on December 31, 1822. He was interred in Woodlawn Cemetery in Canandaigua. Granger is the namesake of Granger Township, Ohio.

Political offices
Preceded by Joseph Habersham	United States Postmaster General; Served under: Thomas Jefferson, James Madison; November 28, 1801 – March 17, 1814	Succeeded by Return J. Meigs, Jr.
