= Alexander Webster (New York politician) =

American politician

Alexander Webster (1734 – September 21, 1810) was an American politician from New York.

== Life ==
He was born in 1734 in Argyleshire, Scotland. He married Eleanor Burney (c.1730–1826), and they had several children. They went to the Province of New York in 1772, and settled in New Perth, Charlotte County (now Salem, Washington County). He fought in the American Revolutionary War and became a colonel of the State Militia.

Webster was a member of the 3rd and 4th New York Provincial Congresses (Charlotte Co.) in 1776 and 1777; and a member of the New York State Senate (Eastern D.) from 1777 to 1779, sitting in the 1st, 2nd, 3rd, 4th, 5th, 6th, 7th and 8th New York State Legislatures. He was a member of the Council of Appointment in 1777–78, 1779–80, 1781–82 and 1784. He was Commissioner of Forfeitures for the Eastern District from 1783 to 1800, in charge of the confiscation and sale of Loyalists' properties.

When the first political parties appeared, Webster sided with the Anti-Federalists, and later became a Democratic-Republican. He was a member of the New York State Assembly (Washington Co.) in 1788 and 1788–89; and again a member of the State Senate from 1789 to 1793, sitting in the 13th, 14th, 15th and 16th New York State Legislatures. He was again a member of the Council of Appointment in 1791.

In December 1794, he ran as an Independent Democratic-Republican for Congress in the Saratoga–Washington district, but was defeated by the regular Democratic-Republican John Williams.

He died on September 21, 1810, at his home in Hebron, New York; and was buried at the Old Hebron Cemetery there.
