= Elishama Tozer =

American politician

Elishama Tozer (July 3, 1741 – 1833) was an American politician and Revolutionary War veteran from New York.

== Life ==
He was born on July 3, 1741, in Lyme, New Hampshire, the son of Thomas Tozer (born 1711) and Deborah (née Bates) Tozer (born 1718). In 1761, he married a woman named Mary, and they had several children. They lived in Whitehall, New York.

During the American Revolutionary War, he was a lieutenant in the Green Mountain Boys under Maj. John Brown.

He was a member from Charlotte County of the New York State Assembly in 1778-79 and a member of the New York State Senate (Eastern D.) in 1779-80.

Around 1801 he moved to Waverly, Tioga County, New York. In 1828, Tozer, along with Piere Hyatt and Jerusha Wilcox, organized the Factoryville class in Waverly. He was also a local preacher.

He died in 1833, and was buried at the Rest Cemetery in Sayre, Pennsylvania.

== Sources ==
- Ancestors of Stephen Gregg Parker at Family Tree Maker
- Tri-Counties Genealogy & History by Joyce M. Tice
- The New York Civil List compiled by Franklin Benjamin Hough (pages 111 and 158; Weed, Parsons and Co., 1858) [name given as "Elishamer Towser" on page 158, and "Elishamer Towzer" on page 310]
