= Evert Bancker =

Evert Bancker may refer to:

- Evert Bancker (speaker) (1721–1803), American merchant and politician, speaker of the New York state assembly
- Evert Bancker (mayor) (1665–1734), American trader and politician, mayor of Albany
