= Abraham Jones (New York politician) =

American politician

Abraham Jones (1725–1792) was a member of the 1st New York State Legislature 1777 to 1778 from Richmond County, New York. Jones was expelled from the New York Assembly on June 8, 1778, for being with the enemy.

== About ==
Jones was born to a Welsh family which bought their original land in what is now the New Springville section on Staten Island from Governor Dongan. He commanded a company in Billopp's Battalion of Staten Island, a Loyalist militia group. During the course of the American Revolutionary War, he was captured by American rebels, who brought him to Trenton, New Jersey where he was imprisoned.

Upon the war's conclusion he moved to Nova Scotia for a brief period, but upon returning to the States in 1792 he died at sea, where he was buried.

== Family ==
Jones was married to Jannetje Personet (1731-1808), daughter of George Personet and Jenneke Mangels. They had two sons and one daughter.
