= William Smith (New York politician, born 1720) =

American politician

Member of the New York State Senate for the Southern District
- In office 1777–1783
- Preceded by: Inaugural holder
- Succeeded by: Samuel Townsend

Personal details
- Born: June 28, 1720 Manor St. George, Brookhaven, Province of New York, British America
- Died: March 17, 1799 (aged 78)
- Spouses: Mary Smith (died 1758) Ruth Woodhull (m. 1762)
- Relations: William "Tangier" Smith (grandfather)
- Children: 8, including John
- Parent(s): William Henry Smith; Hannah Sayre Cooper

William Smith (June 28, 1720 – March 17, 1799) was an American politician from New York.

== Early life ==
He was born on June 28, 1720, at Manor St. George in Brookhaven, Suffolk County, New York, the son of Maj. William Henry Smith (1690–1743) and Hannah (née Sayre) Cooper Smith. Before his parents marriage, his mother was married to John Cooper

His maternal grandfather was Capt. Daniel Sayre and his paternal grandfather was William "Tangier" Smith, the Chief Justice of the Province of New York.

== Career ==
He was a judge of the Suffolk County Court from 1771 to 1775. At the outbreak of the American Revolutionary War he sided with the Patriots. He stayed with friends in Orange County and got involved in politics.

He was a member of the 3rd and 4th New York Provincial Congresses in 1776 and 1777. He was appointed by the New York Constitutional Convention to the New York State Senate to represent the Southern District which was under British control and no State election could be held there. He was a member of the State Senate from 1777 to 1783, sitting in the 1st, 2nd, 3rd, 4th, 5th and 6th New York State Legislatures. He was one of nine senators who represented the Southern District of New York, which consisted of Kings, New York, Queens, Richmond, Suffolk and Westchester counties.

== Personal life ==
He married Mary Smith (1735–1758). Before her death on April 22, 1758, they were the parents of:

- John Smith (1752–1816), a U.S. Senator who married three times, including to Elizabeth (née Woodhull) Nicoll, a daughter of Gen. Nathaniel Woodhull.
- Mary Smith (1758–1759), who died in infancy.

On March 2, 1762, William married Ruth Woodhull (1740–1822), the sister of Gen. Nathaniel Woodhull and State Senator Jesse Woodhull. Together, William and Ruth were the parents of six children, two sons and four daughters, including:

- Hannah Smith (1764–1809), who married her cousin Capt. Richard William Woodhull, a son of Col. Jesse Woodhull.
- William Smith (1769–1803), who married Hannah Phoenix Smith.
- Sarah Smith (1773–1792), who died unmarried.
- Elizabeth Smith (1775–1795), who died unmarried.

He died on March 17, 1799.

Political offices
Preceded by Inaugural holder	Member of the New York State Senate; 1777–1783	Succeeded by Samuel Townsend
