= Granger Homestead =

American museum

Coordinates: 42°53′51.5″N 77°17′12.5″W

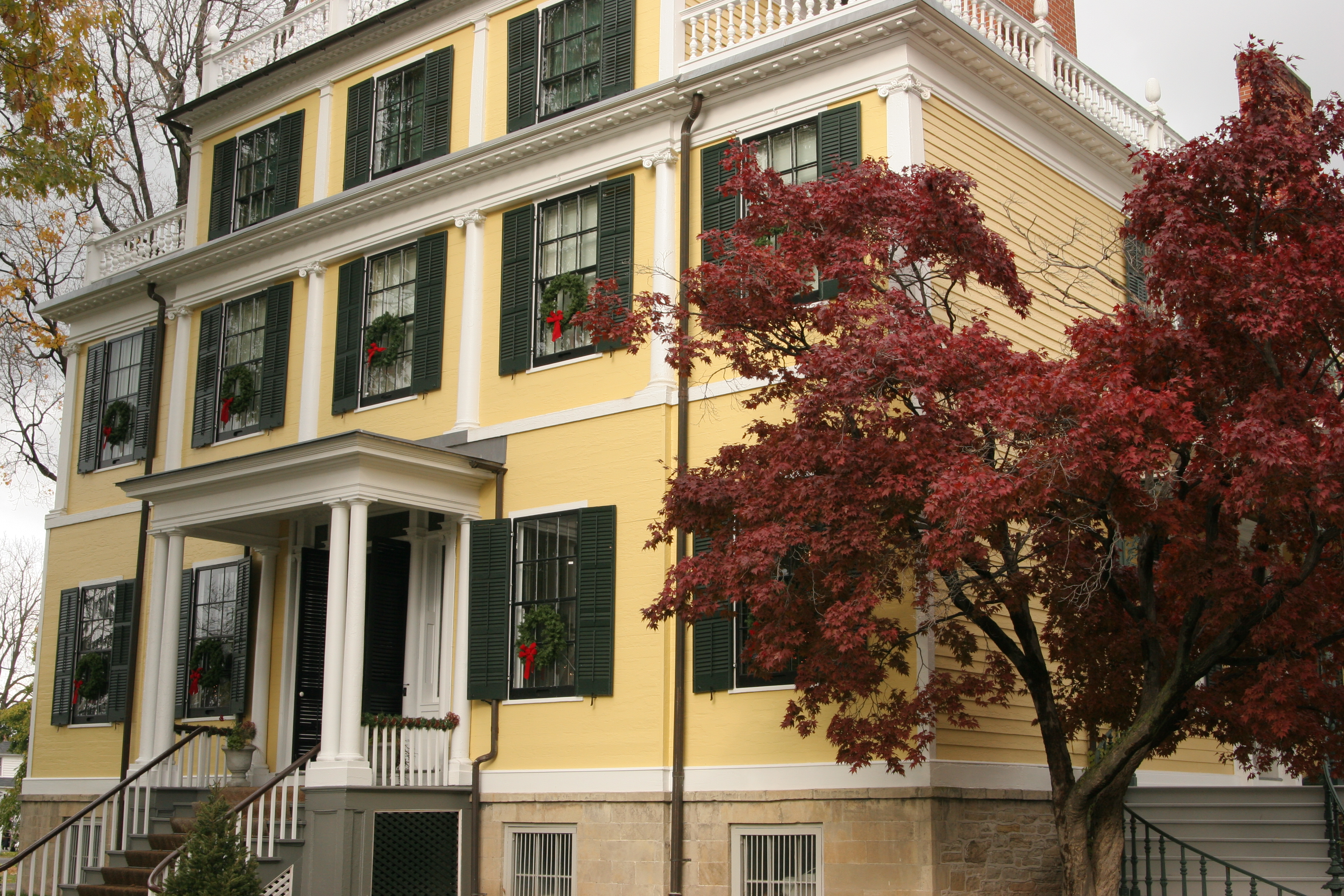
Granger Homestead

The Granger Homestead and Carriage Museum is a museum in the 1816 Federal-style mansion in Canandaigua, New York built by Gideon Granger. The property remained in the Granger family for four generations. A carriage house contains a carriage museum.

Two barns on the 10-acre (4.0 ha) hold close to 100 antique carriages and sleighs. One barn has a large collection of original Granger family farming equipment.

The mansion faced demolition in 1945, but was saved due to the donation and interest of Joseph Cribb, who provided many of the carriages displayed in the museum, which was founded in the 1960s.
