= Jesse Woodhull =

American politician

Jesse Woodhull (February 10, 1735 – February 3, 1795) was an American politician from New York.

== Life ==
Coat of Arms of Jesse Woodhull

He was born on February 10, 1734/5, in Setauket, Suffolk County, Province of New York, the son of Nathaniel Woodhull (1691–1760) and Sarah (Smith) Woodhull (born 1701). In 1753, he married Hester Du Bois (1734–1808), of New Paltz, and they had seven children. They settled in "Blagg's Cove", then located in the Goshen Precinct in Orange County. The area became part of the Town of Cornwall in 1764, and of the Town of Blooming Grove in 1799. He fought in the American Revolutionary War and became colonel of the 1st Regiment of the Orange County State Militia.

Woodhull was a member of the New York State Senate (Middle D.) from 1777 to 1781, sitting in the 1st, 2nd, 3rd and 4th New York State Legislatures. He was a member of the Council of Appointment in 1777–78. He was a delegate to the New York State Convention to Ratify the U.S. Constitution in 1788, and voted for the adoption of the constitution. He was a presidential elector in 1792, voting for George Washington and George Clinton.

He died on February 3, 1795, at his home in New-Blooming Grove; and was buried at a private burial ground there. Later he was re-interred at the Cemetery of the Highlands, in Highland Mills.

Gen. Nathaniel Woodhull (1722–1776) was his brother and State Senator William Smith (1720–1799) was his brother-in-law.
