= Joseph Benedict =

American patriot in the American Revolutionary War

Joseph Benedict (1730–1785) was an American patriot who served during the American Revolutionary War.

He served as the Captain for the 2nd division of the 4th New York Regiment from July 27, 1775 until March 8, 1776. On March 8, 1776, Benedict was promoted to Major of the 1st New York Regiment and served in this capacity until April 27, 1776. After leaving the Continental Army, Benedict served as a lieutenant colonel in the New York militia. While in the militia, Benedict worked to stabilize the infamous Neutral Ground of New York's Westchester County.

From October 13, 1778 to March 17, 1779, Benedict served an Assemblyman in the 2nd New York State Legislature for Westchester County. Benedict died in 1785.
