= James Jay =

Colonial American physician

Sir James Jay
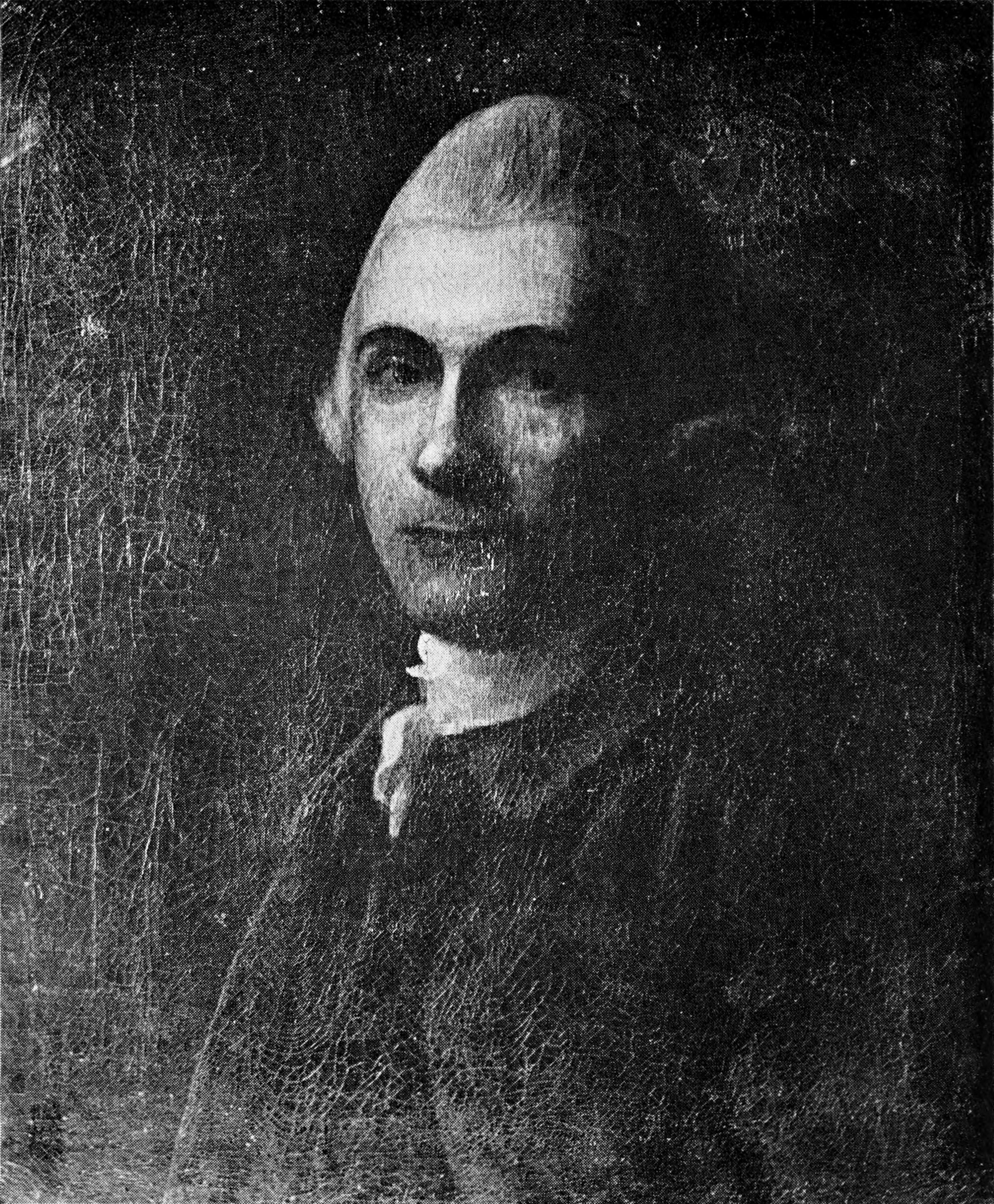

Member of the New York State Senate
- In office October 7, 1778 – July 22, 1782
- Preceded by: Philip Livingston
- Succeeded by: James Duane

Personal details
- Born: October 16, 1732 New York City, Province of New York, British America
- Died: 1815 (aged 82–83)
- Spouse: Anne Erwin (m. 1785)
- Relations: John Jay (brother); Peter A. Jay (nephew); William Jay (nephew); Jacobus Van Cortlandt (grandfather)
- Children: 2
- Parent(s): Peter Jay; Mary Van Cortlandt Jay
- Education: University of Edinburgh

Sir James Jay (October 16, 1732 – 1815) was an American physician and politician. He was brother of John Jay, one of the Founding Fathers of the United States. While initially a supporter of American independence, he later changed his views becoming a Loyalist and went into exile in London after the Treaty of Paris recognised independence.

== Early life ==
The Jays were a prominent merchant family in New York City, descended from Huguenots who had come to New York to escape religious persecution in France. In 1685 the Edict of Nantes had been revoked, thereby abolishing the rights of Protestants and confiscating their property. Among those affected was Jay's paternal grandfather, Augustus Jay. He moved from France to New York, where he built a successful merchant empire. Jay's father, Peter Jay, born in New York City in 1704, became a wealthy trader in furs, wheat, timber, and other commodities.

James Jay was born in New York City; later the family moved to Rye, New York, when Peter Jay retired from business following a smallpox epidemic that had blinded two of his children.

James' mother was Mary Van Cortlandt, who had married Peter Jay in 1728, in the Dutch Church. They had ten children together, seven of whom survived into adulthood. Mary's father, Jacobus Van Cortlandt, had been born in New Amsterdam in 1658. Cortlandt served on the New York General Assembly, was twice mayor of New York City, and also held a variety of judicial and military offices. Two of his children (the other one being his son Frederick) married into the Jay family.

== Career ==
James Jay studied medicine in Edinburgh, and became a practicing physician. Along with William Smith, he was instrumental in obtaining the endowments for Benjamin Franklin's projected college in Philadelphia (now known as the University of Pennsylvania) in 1755, and King's College in New York (now Columbia University). For the purpose of soliciting contributions for the latter college, he visited England in 1762, where he was knighted by King George III in 1763.

His writings include two pamphlets relating to the collections made for the colleges in America (1771 and 1774) and Reflections and Observations on the Gout (1772).

=== Politics ===
On October 7, 1778, Sir James was appointed by the New York State Assembly as one of the representatives from the Southern District in the New York State Senate, to fill the vacancy caused by the death of Philip Livingston. He sat in the 2nd, 3rd, 4th and 5th New York State Legislatures. At first he was a supporter of independence. He actively promoted the Bill of Attainder and Confiscation which the legislature passed on 22 October 1779 directed at 59 loyalists. This bill was an anathema to Jay's brother John who saw it as persecuting people for their opinions.

In 1782, Sir James connived to get himself arrested by the British so he could present a plan of reconciliation with Great Britain, as he was very suspicious of the French. He was treated as a spy and imprisoned, and his senate seat was declared vacant. Guy Carleton released him and allowed him to go to England. This led to suspicions about his loyalties among the revolutionaries. In a letter to Peter Van Schaak of 17 September 1782, John Jay stated that "If after making so much bustle in and for America, he has, as it is surmised, improperly made his peace with Britain, I shall endeavor to forget that my father has such a son." After the Revolution, the brothers had little contact with one another.

=== Invention of invisible ink ===
Invisible ink was used occasionally after Sir James invented two special fluids, and sent a supply to his brother John Jay in New York. Sir James would use the ink at the bottom of brief, friendly letters to his brother and even send the letters unsealed, so that British authorities might inspect the contents. Using this method, James told John of the British ministry's decision to force the colonies into submission; he also wrote from London to Benjamin Franklin and Silas Deane in Paris and warned them of Gen. John Burgoyne's intended invasion from Canada. Deane had been given a supply of ink by John Jay shortly before sailing for France in March 1776 as a spy, and later James Jay sent him additional supplies. Letters from Deane were specially handled by John Jay who treated them with the particular chemical to make the writing visible; even Robert Morris, American Revolutionary War financier, submitted his Deane letters to Jay for treatment and kept the invisible ink technique confidential. Later secret reports of George Washington together with those of his spies in New York, Abraham Woodhull of Long Island (codename: Samuel Culper) and Robert Townsend of New York City (codename: Culper Jr), were written in what Washington termed "white ink"; the second liquid was used to make the secret writing visible.

=== Later life ===
By the end of 1784, Sir James had returned to America where he resumed the practice of medicine and attended William Livingston (the first Governor of New Jersey and father of Sarah Livingston Jay, his brother John's wife) in his final illness. In 1800, he ran for New Jersey Assembly, but lost. He petitioned Congress for repayment of a loan he made during the Revolutionary War, but failed in that as well.

In 1813, Sir James presented a "Narrative" to Congress which insisted that in Europe he worked to implement plans to attack British commerce and ports.

== Personal life ==
In 1785, after Jay returned to New York, he was married to Anne Erwin (1750–1840) and they lived in Springfield, New Jersey (although some sources claim they never married). Together, they were the parents of two children, including Mary (née Jay) Okill (1785–1859), a "vivacious woman" who became a "headmistress of one of the most highly regarded female academies in New York City." She married merchant and broker John Okill, and was mother of Mary Helena Okill (1815–1893) (who married Dennis Hart Mahan, a military theorist, civil engineer and professor at the United States Military Academy at West Point; they were the parents of naval historian and theorist Rear Admiral Alfred Thayer Mahan).

Sir Jay died in 1815. He was buried in Jay Cemetery in Rye.
