= Dirck Brinckerhoff =

American soldier

Member of the New York State Assembly for Dutchess County
- In office 1777–1780
- Preceded by: Inaugural holder
- Succeeded by: Guisbert Schenck

Member of the New York General Assembly for Dutchess County
- In office 1768–1777
- Succeeded by: Disbanded

Personal details
- Born: 1724 Dutchess County, Province of New York, British America
- Died: 1789 (aged 64–65) Fishkill, New York, U.S.
- Spouse: Geertie Wyckoff (m. 1747; died 1767)
- Parent(s): Femmetje Remsen Brinckerhoff; Abraham Brinckerhoff

Dirck Brinckerhoff or Derick Brinkerhoff (1724 – 1789) was an American soldier who fought in the Revolutionary War and politician who served in both the New York General Assembly and the New York State Assembly.

== Early life ==
Brinckerhoff was born in 1724. He was the eldest child of Femmetje (née Remsen) Brinckerhoff (1703–1771) and Abraham Brinckerhoff (1701–1738). Among his younger siblings was Altie Brinckerhoff, who married New York State Senator Abraham Adriance.

His paternal grandfather, and namesake, Dirck Brinckerhoff came to the Hudson Valley in 1718 from Long Island and acquired a 2,000-acre tract of land that stretched from Fishkill to Sprout Creek. His father built a house on the property in 1717, which he later inherited and expanded.

== Career ==
Coat of Arms of Dirck Brinckerhoff

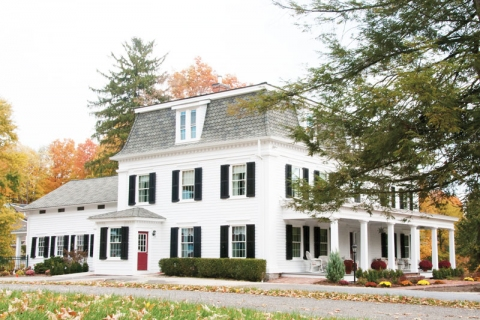
The Brinckerhoff mansion

Brinckerhoff built a store and grist mill on his property, which he inherited from his family. His house was about two miles from the gateway of the mountains directly south of Fishkill.

For nine consecutive years from 1768 to 1777, he represented Dutchess County in the New York General Assembly.

During the American Revolutionary War, he was a Colonel of the Second Regiment of Dutchess County Militia in 1777 known as Brinckerhoff's Regiment of Militia. During the war, his house, which was two miles from the hospitals, workshops, and barracks of the Continental Army, hosted many officers and prominent people, including John Adams, George Washington, Gilbert du Motier, Marquis de Lafayette (who spent six weeks recovering in the second-floor bedroom), Alexander Hamilton, General Alexander McDougall, who used the home as his headquarters, Governor George Clinton, and Generals Putnam, Knox, Arnold, Greene, and Gates.

After the Revolution, he served in the New York State Assembly as a member of the 1st, 2nd and 3rd New York State Legislatures. He was also Chairman of the Vigilance Committee of Poughkeepsie.

== Personal life ==
On August 27, 1747 Brinckerhoff was married to Geertie Wyckoff (1730–1767) in Flatlands, New York. She was a daughter of Hendrick Cornelius Wyckoff and the former Annatie Bennet. Together, they were the parents of:

- Abraham Brinckerhoff (b. 1748), who married Sarah Brett, a daughter of Robert Brett, in 1770.
- Jacob Brinckerhoff (1754–1818), who married Dientie Van Wyck in 1774.
- Femmetje "Phebe" Brinckerhoff (1764–1855), who married Col. Aaron Stockholm (1756–1825).

Brinckerhoff died in Fishkill in 1789 and was buried in the family vault on his property. Much of his personal and family history were lost, including his family Bible, which was burned.
