= Henry Oothoudt =

American politician (1739–1801)

Henry Oothoudt (January 6, 1739 O.S. – July 14, 1801) was an American politician from New York.

== Life ==
He was born on January 6, 1739 (old style), the son of Volkert Oothoudt. He married Eleanor "Neeltje" Van Bergen (1725/6–1793), and they had one daughter, Catherina (born 1763). They lived in Catskill, then in Albany County, now in Greene County.

Oothoudt was a member of the 2nd New York Provincial Congress in 1775–76; of the New York State Assembly (Albany Co.) in 1779–80; and of the New York State Senate (Western D.) from 1781 to 1785, sitting in the 5th, 6th, 7th and 8th New York State Legislatures. He was a member of the Council of Appointment in 1781–82.

He was an Anti-Federalist delegate to the New York State Convention to adopt the United States Constitution in 1788. He was appointed as Chairman of the Committee of the Whole, and eventually voted against adoption.

In 1790, he ran again for the State Senate, but was defeated by Federalist Leonard Gansevoort.

He died on July 14, 1801, and was buried at the Jefferson Rural Cemetery in Catskill.
