= Jacob Ford (politician) =

American Revolutionary War officer, New York politician, and judge

- Born: April 22, 1744; Hebron, Connecticut, Thirteen Colonies
- Died: July 24, 1837 (aged 93)
- Burial place: Austerlitz, New York, U.S.
- Spouse: Abigail Curtice
- Children: 10
- Military career
- Rank: Lieutenant Colonel
- Unit: 9th Regiment of Militia of Foot
- Conflicts: American Revolutionary War
- Other work: Politician and judge

Jacob Ford (April 22, 1744 – July 24, 1837) was an American Revolutionary War officer, New York politician, and judge.

== Early life ==
Jacob Ford was born April 22, 1744, in Hebron, Connecticut. He was married on March 5, 1765, with Abigail Curtice and they had 10 children: Abigail, Jacob, Levina, Sylvester, Ansyl, Elijah, Olive, Isaac, Aaron, and Sally.

== Career ==
Jacob Ford was commissioned captain of the 4th Company in the 9th Regiment of Militia of Foot in the County of Albany. On October 20, 1775, he was major of the same regiment.

Following the April 1777 insurrection by the Tories in Ballston, New York a court martial for treason was convened for James Hueston of Albany County. Hueston was implicated in the raising of volunteers who took an oath of secrecy and allegiance to the King of Great Britain. Colonel Richard Varick served as Judge Advocate, and members of the panel included Colonel William Bradford Whiting, Colonel Asa Waterman, and Major Jacob Ford. On June 14, 1777, Hueston was found guilty and sentenced to be hanged. This sentence was confirmed by the Provincial Council of Safety, on June 18, 1777. Brig. General Abraham Ten Broeck was ordered to carry out the execution.

Major Ford took part in the Northern Campaign against the British troops commanded by General John Burgoyne, and was serving in that Campaign under General Philip Schuyler and General Horatio Gates during the Battles of Saratoga and was present when General Burgoyne surrendered on October 17, 1777. He was promoted to lieutenant colonel on May 28, 1778.

July 18, 1778 Lieutenant Colonel Jacob Ford wrote a letter to General Abraham Ten Broeck informing him that today the New York Settlement called Springfield had been burnt and destroyed by Tories & Indians. Most of the inhabitants were moved and are safe but he doesn't have enough manpower to defend them. He is awaiting reinforcements of a small Company of Rangers. This letter is included in Governor George Clinton's Papers and was forwarded to General George Washington on July 21, 1778 It was later reported that it was Joseph Brant the Mohawk Chieftain who burnt the entire settlement except for a single house where Brant left the remaining women and children unharmed.

Lieutenant Colonel Jacob Ford resigned from the Albany County Militia on November 4, 1778. Ford was elected to the New York State Assembly from 1781 to 1785 as a representative of Albany County. In 1792 Jacob was elected to the New York State Assembly to represent the newly formed Columbia County, New York.

Jacob was appointed justice of the peace in 1786 and in 1801; was associate judge of the New York Court of Common Pleas in 1795, and was made first judge the following year.

== Death ==
Jacob Ford died July 24, 1837, at the age of 93.
