= Jonathan Dennis =

New Zealand film archivist, broadcaster and writer

- Born: 27 September 1953
- Died: 25 January 2002 (aged 48)
- Occupations: Archivist, writer, radio presenter

Jonathan Dennis (27 September 1953 – 25 January 2002) was a New Zealand film archivist, broadcaster and writer. He was a founder of the New Zealand Film Archive and its director from 1981 to 1990.

He both made and was the subject of various documentaries along with presenting Radio New Zealand's "Film Show" for many years.

== Awards ==
Dennis was honored in 1990 with the Queen's Service Medal for his work in establishing the NZ Film Archive (now known as Ngā Taonga Sound & Vision). In 1993 Le Giornate Cinema del Muto (the Pordenone Silent Film Festival held annually in Pordenone, Italy) honored his services to silent film with the Jean Mitry Award.
