= Ephraim Paine =

American politician

Ephraim Paine (August 19, 1730 in Canterbury, Windham County, Connecticut – August 10, 1785 in Amenia, Dutchess County, New York) was an American physician and politician from New York (state). He was a delegate to the Continental Congress in 1784.

== Biography ==
He moved with his parents to the area of the Great Nine Partners Patent. He studied medicine, and practiced in Amenia.

Paine was a delegate to the New York Provincial Congress in 1775. From 1778 to 1781, he was First Judge of the Dutchess County Court.

He was a member of the New York State Senate (Middle D.) from 1779 to 1781, and was elected to the Council of Appointment in September 1780. On March 15, 1781, he was expelled from the State Senate for "neglect of duty," and was the only member of the Council of Appointment who did not finish his one-year term. He was again a member of the State Senate from 1782 to 1785.

He was Supervisor of Amenia in 1782 and 1783, and a delegate from New York to the Congress of the Confederation in 1784.

He was buried at the Red Meeting House Cemetery, near Amenia.

== See also ==
- List of New York Legislature members expelled or censured
