= William B. Whiting =

New York politician (1731–1796)

Hon. William B. Whiting

Justice of the Peace of the Columbia County, New York Court of Common Pleas
- In office 1786–1795

Member of the New York State Council of Appointment
- In office 1784–1785
- In office 1782–1783

Member of the New York State Senate from the Western District
- In office 1781–1785 Serving with Jacob G. Klock, Henry Oothoudt, Philip Schuyler, Abraham Ten Broeck, and Abraham Yates Jr.

Member of the New York State Assembly from Albany County
- In office 1777–1780

Supervisor of the Town of Canaan, New York
- In office 1773–1773

Personal details
- Born: April 15, 1731 Hartford, Connecticut
- Died: October 13, 1796 (aged 65)
- Resting place: Canaan, New York
- Spouse(s): Abigail Carew (m. 1754; died 1756) Amy Lathrop (m. 1757)
- Children: 13

Military service
- Allegiance: New York
- Branch/service: New York Militia
- Years of service: 1777–1781
- Rank: Colonel
- Commands: 17th Albany County militia Regiment
- Conflict: American Revolutionary War; Battles of Saratoga

William Bradford Whiting (April 15, 1731 – October 13, 1796) was an American politician. Born in Hartford, Connecticut, Whiting moved to Canaan, New York, in 1765. During the American Revolutionary War, he served as a colonel commanding the 17th Regiment of the Albany County militia. He participated in the Battles of Saratoga under General Horatio Gates and was present for the surrender of General John Burgoyne. Whiting was a member of the New York State Assembly from 1777–1781 and the New York State Senate from 1781–1785, and a justice of the peace in Columbia County, New York, from 1786–1795.

== Early life in Connecticut (1731–1765) ==
Whiting was born in Hartford, Connecticut on April 15, 1731, to a prominent family of colonists who were early settlers of Hartford. William's great-great-grandfather William Whiting was a politician and one of the founders of the Connecticut Colony; his great-grandfather led Hartford's Congregationalist church; and his grandfather William Whiting, who married a descendant of the colonist William Pynchon, served in the Connecticut General Court. Whiting's father, Charles, married Elizabeth Bradford, a descendant of the Plymouth Colony governor William Bradford.

Whiting married Abigail Carew in 1754; they were married until her death on May 20, 1756. On July 24, 1757, he married Amy Lathrop, a descendant of the minister John Lathrop. In 1760, Whiting purchased land in Norwich, Connecticut, where he lived and likely worked as a shoemaker.

== Life in New York (1765–1796) ==
In 1765, Whiting moved with his family to what is now Canaan, New York, settling near Whiting Pond, which later came to be known as Queechy Lake. Whiting purchased the property from his brother, Gamaliel, who had decided that "he was unfit to be a pioneer" and moved back to Connecticut after just two years working the land. In 1772, William was elected to serve as the first town supervisor of King's District, which comprised the present-day towns of Canaan, New Lebanon, Chatham, and Austerlitz, for the year 1773. He built the town's first grist mill in 1775; it was burned down during the American Revolutionary War and later rebuilt.

On May 2, 1775, Whiting was appointed clerk of the King's District committee of safety, and in 1776 he voted along with the Committee to support New York declaring independence from Britain. From 1777–1781, Whiting served as a colonel commanding the 17th Regiment of the Albany County militia. He served under General Horatio Gates at the Battles of Saratoga and was present for the surrender of General John Burgoyne.

Whiting served as a member of the New York State Assembly representing Albany County from its first session in 1777 through its third session in 1780. He then served from 1781 to 1785 in the New York State Senate representing the Western District. He was elected to the Council of Appointment in 1782 and 1784. From 1786 to 1795, he served as a justice of the peace of the Columbia County, New York Court of Common Pleas, where he is known to have worked on a prominent counterfeiting case.

Whiting died on October 13, 1796, aged 65. He was survived by his wife Amy and many of his 13 children.

== Sources ==
- "Col. Charles Seaforth Stewart". Biographical Review. Boston: Biographical Review Publishing Co. 1893. pp. 156–158 – via HathiTrust.
- Colton, Walter Raymond (July 1899). "Notes on the Whiting Ancestry of Walter R. Colton". The "Old Northwest" Genealogical Quarterly. 2: 106–109 – via Internet Archive.
- "Factors in Columbia County History". Columbia County at the End of the Century. Vol. 2. Published and edited under the auspices of the Hudson Gazette. Hudson, N.Y.: The Record Printing and Publishing Co. 1900 – via HathiTrust.
- History of Columbia County, New York (PDF). Philadelphia: Everts & Ensign. 1878. Archived (PDF) from the original on July 12, 2025.
- Hough, Franklin B. (1858). The New-York Civil List (PDF). Albany, N.Y.: Weed, Parsons & Co. – via Internet Archive.
- Hubner, Brian E. (1993). "The Americans: Saratoga from First Freeman's Farm to Burgoyne's Surrender". In Blanco, Richard L. (ed.). The American Revolution, 1775-1783: An Encyclopedia. Vol. 2. New York: Garland Publishing. pp. 1492–1497. ISBN 978-0-8240-5623-0.
- Perkins, Mary E. (1895). Old Houses of the Antient Town of Norwich, 1660–1800. Norwich, Conn.: The Bulletin Co. – via Internet Archive.
- Scott, Kenneth (1953). Counterfeiting in Colonial New York. Numismatic Notes and Monographs no. 127. New York: American Numismatic Society. JSTOR 43607427.
