= Henry Wisner =

American politician

Goshen's memorial to Henry Wisner

Henry Wisner (c. 1720 – March 4, 1790) was a miller from Goshen, New York. He was a Patriot leader during the American Revolution who, as a member of the Second Continental Congress, voted for Independence on July 4, 1776, at the creation of the Declaration of Independence. As a member of the First Continental Congress, Wisner signed the 1774 Continental Association.

== Early life ==
Wisner was born around 1720 in Florida, New York, and was a resident of Orange County. He built and operated a gristmill in Goshen and became one of the town's leading citizens. His family originally came to America in the 1710 migration to New York of Johannes Weesner and other Swiss veterans of the English Army who had fought under the Duke of Marlborough in the War of the Spanish Succession.

== Political career ==
Orange County first elected Wisner as a representative to Province of New York Assembly in 1759 and returned him for eleven consecutive years. In 1768 he became a judge in the county's court of common pleas.

=== During the American Revolution ===
When New York created a revolutionary government in 1775, Wisner was sent to the New York Provincial Congress. That body, in turn, named him as a delegate to both the First and Second Continental Congresses, where he served through 1776. Wisner was a signatory to the Olive Branch Petition, which was adopted by Congress on July 5, 1775, as a last-ditch effort to avert war with Great Britain and reconcile the colonies with the mother country. Wisner was later present on July 4, 1776, and voted for Independence as noted in multiple written accounts, the closest in being a reprint on July 2, 1800, in the Lancaster Intelligencer. Additionally, in an obituary notice of Thomas McKean of Delaware in the Boston Centinal in 1817, it was noted that McKean was present on July 4, 1776, and voted for Independence, as did Wisner. After the New York delegation was finally authorized to support the Declaration, a signing ceremony took place in August 1776, but Wisner was not present in Congress to sign.

While in Congress, Wisner learned that one of the Continental Army's difficulties was obtaining powder and shot. When he returned home he built three gunpowder mills in Orange and Ulster Counties. At their height he was shipping 1,000 pounds of gunpowder each week to George Washington's army. He later financed the erection of cannon and defensive works overlooking the Hudson River, that blocked the British ability to use the river in the Highlands Region.

In late 1776 Wisner, along with Gilbert Livingston of Poughkeepsie, sounded the Hudson River and, as part of a Secret Committee, recommended the placement of what became known as the Great Chain which stretched from the current location of West Point to Constitution Island. This chain was part of a series of Hudson River Chains designed to thwart British naval movements on the Hudson

In 1777, serving again in the Provincial Congress, Wisner was a member of the committee that drafted the first constitution for the state of New York. Under that constitution, Wisner was a member of the state senate from 1777 until 1782.

=== Later years ===
After the war, Wisner remained active in civic affairs. In 1784, he founded an academy in Goshen and was one of the regents of the University of the State of New York from 1784 to 1787. In 1788, Wisner was a delegate to the state convention called to ratify the U.S. Constitution. He was one of those who opposed ratification, fearing that the strong central government would eventually infringe on state and individual rights.

== Personal life ==
Wisner married Sarah Norton in 1739. His son Gabriel, born 1754, died in 1779 in the Battle of Minisink. He married Elizabeth Waters and had three children. His daughter, Sarah Wisner (1745–1810), married Major Moses Phillips (a descendant of the Rev, George Phillips, the Winthrop family through Elizabeth Fones, and Thomas Cornell (settler)), with whom he made gunpowder for Washington.

Moses Wisner, a collateral descendant, was the 12th Governor of Michigan. Charles F. Brush, commercializer of the arc lamp and founder of a predecessor firm of General Electric, is a great great-grandson.

Wisner died at home in Goshen in 1790. He was buried in the Old Wallkill Cemetery in Wallkill, New York.
