= Robert Harpur =

American politician

Robert Harpur (January 25, 1731 – April 15, 1825) was an Irish-American teacher, politician, pioneer, and landowner. He participated in surveying lands within the Central Military Tract in New York State and is credited with giving classical (Latin and Greek) place names to numerous locations in central New York. He settled in the Binghamton, New York area, where Harpur College (later the Harpur College of Arts and Sciences of Binghamton University) was named for him.

== Life ==
Harpur was born in Ballybay, County Monaghan, Ireland. He was a graduate of the University of Glasgow and taught in Ireland for 7 years before coming to the Colony of New York in 1760. Three days after his arrival in 1761 he was installed as professor of mathematics at King's College, renamed Columbia College after U.S. independence (today the undergraduate college of Columbia University). One of his pupils was Alexander Hamilton while he studied there in 1774. During his tenure, he was hired by the university to catalog the collections of the Columbia library, making him the first librarian of the university.

Harpur served in various capacities in the New York government during the American Revolution. He was a member of the New York State Assembly from 1777 to 1784. He was Deputy Secretary of State under John Morin Scott and Lewis Allaire Scott from 1778 to 1795. In the spring of 1795 Robert Harpur, with his 2nd wife Myra and family, moved west along the upper Susquehanna River. He settled near Belden Brook on his Warren Patent, which is near present-day Harpursville, NY.

== Legacy ==
Harpursville, New York in eastern Broome County, New York was named after him. Additionally, Harpur College, the arts and sciences component, and the oldest part, of present-day Binghamton University, was also named for him.

== Classical names used in New York ==
While Harpur worked as a clerk in the office of the New York State Surveyor General, and Secretary of the Land Board, he assigned numerous classical tradition names to locations in the Central New York Military Tract, today in Cayuga County, Cortland County, Oneida County, Onondaga County, and Seneca County.

Many central New York cities are named after places and figures of the Greco-Roman world, including Rome, Syracuse, Ithaca, Troy, Homer, Cicero, and Ovid. This is largely due to the influence of Harpur, who assigned many of the best known names.

An earlier theory was that Surveyor General Simeon De Witt assigned these classical names.

== Archival material ==
The New York State Library, in Albany, New York, holds the following materials of Harpur, according to its online catalog: "This collection contains material created by Harpur and material collected about him. Among Harpur's papers are his personal account books, 1768-1814, which include house expenses and tuition accounts for students he tutored; and a photostat of a land grant to Harpur for lands in Kingsbury and Queensbury townships. Among the items collected about Harpur are several biographies, postcards of the Senate House in Kingston, N.Y. and Clinton's mansion, and a photostat of a 1790 print of Columbia College, where Harpur taught."

== See also ==
- Colesville, New York
