= Tryon County, New York =

County in the colonial Province of New York

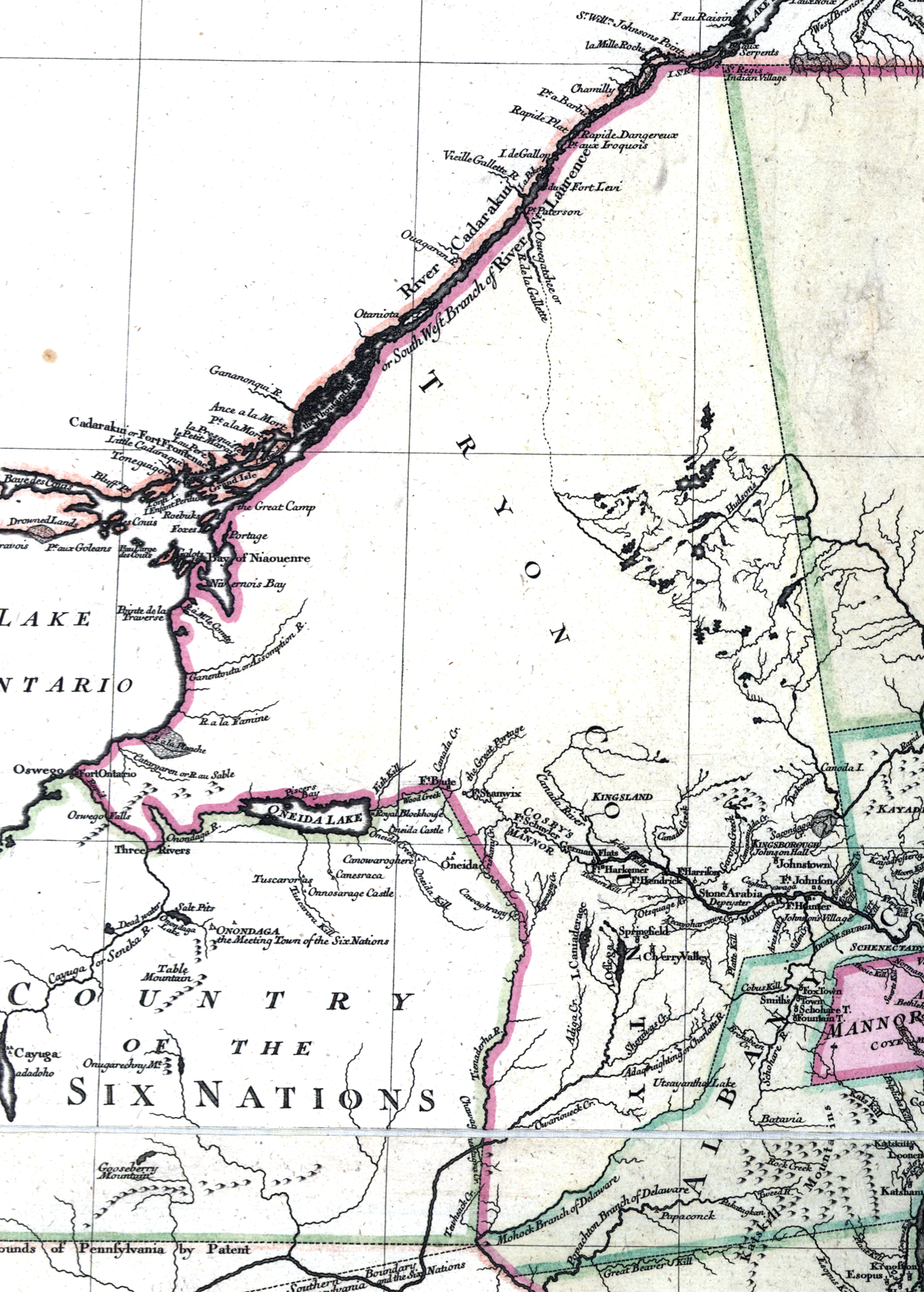
Tryon County in 1777

Tryon County was a county in the colonial Province of New York in the British American colonies. It was created from Albany County on March 24, 1772, and was named for William Tryon, the last provincial governor of New York. The county's boundaries extended much further than any current county. Its eastern boundary with the also-new Charlotte County ran "from the Mohawk River to the Canada line, at a point near the old village of St. Regis and passing south to the Mohawk between Schenectady and Albany." It extended north to the St. Lawrence River; its western boundary was the Treaty of Fort Stanwix's Line of Property, following the Unadilla River, Oneida Lake, Onondaga River and Oswego River to Lake Ontario, as the Iroquois Confederacy still controlled locations further west in the Indian Reserve. Tryon County's seat was Johnstown, which is today the county seat of Fulton County. The Tryon County Courthouse, built in 1772–1773, was listed on the National Register of Historic Places in 1972. The Tryon County Jail, also built in 1772–1773, was listed on the National Register of Historic Places in 1981.

The county was divided into five districts: Mohawk, Palatine, Canajoharie, German Flatts, and Kingsland. The county court house and jail were erected in Johnstown in 1772 establishing Johnstown as the county seat. Three of the seven original judges were relatives of Sir William Johnson: Sir John Johnson (son), Guy Johnson (nephew), and Daniel Claus (son-in-law) with a fourth judge being close business associate and neighbour, Colonel John Butler. The remainder of the original seven judges were Peter Conyne, Jelles Fonda and John Wells. Guy Johnson, John Johnson, Daniel Claus and John Butler sided with Britain during the American Revolution while Fonda, Wells and Conyne supported the American cause.

Its members in the Province of New York assembly were Sir John Johnson and Hendrick Frey.

== American Revolution ==
In August 1774, shortly before the outbreak of the American Revolution, some members of the county formed the Tryon County Committee of Safety to harass their Loyalist neighbors, eventually causing many to flee to the safety of Canada. Guy Johnson and a large party of supporters left in May 1775. Sir John Johnson and a large party of his supporters left in May 1776. By 1776, most of the Loyalists in Tryon County had fled.

In December 1780, the results of a census stated that the number of uncultivated farms was 1200 and that 354 families had abandoned and had fled the county. In some places such as Cherry Valley, Springfield, and Harpersfield there was no one to conduct a census. This was out of a pre-war population of around 10,000. Schenectady came near to being the limit of civilization.

== After the war ==
On April 2, 1784, the new state's legislature voted to change the name to Montgomery County, in honor of General Richard Montgomery, a Continental Army General slain during the Battle of Quebec. The Legislature stated, “From and after the passing of this act, the county of Tryon shall be called and known by the name of Montgomery, and the county of Charlotte by the name of Washington.”

== See also ==
- For the history of Tryon County prior to 1772 see Albany County, New York
- For the history of Tryon County after 1784 see Montgomery County, New York
- List of New York counties
- List of former United States counties

== Bibliography ==
- Anderson, George Baker (1897). Landmarks of Rensselaer County New York. Syracuse, New York: D. Mason and Company. OCLC 1728151.
- Sylvester, Nathaniel Bartlett (1880). History of Rensselaer Co., New York with Illustrations and Biographical Sketches of its Prominent Men and Pioneers. Philadelphia: Everts & Peck. OCLC 3496287.
