= Evert Bancker (speaker) =

American politician (1721–1803)

Evert Bancker (May 29, 1721 – January 13, 1803) was an American merchant and politician who was Speaker of the New York State Assembly from 1779 to 1783.

== Life ==
Coat of Arms of Evert Bancker

He was the son of Christoffel Bancker (b. October 27, 1695, son of Evert Bancker (mayor)) and Elizabeth Hooglant. In 1748, he married Elizabeth Boelen.

Along with his cousin Gerard Bancker, he ran a mercantile business in New York City and from 1769 until the opening of the American Revolution furnished a large part of the supplies for the British troops. Much of the time they held the position of Barrack Masters for the city of New York. At the beginning of the Revolution, Evert was chosen to be one of the Committee of One Hundred.

He was elected a deputy to the second, third and fourth New York Provincial Congresses, was one of a Special Committee of Twelve appointed by the Committee of Safety in 1776, was a member of the New York State Assembly from 1777 to 1783 and was its Speaker from August 1779 through March 1783.

After the revolution he retired and lived with his son, Abraham Boelen Bancker (bptd. September 25, 1754 - February 7, 1806; Clerk of the New York State Senate 1784 to 1801), in Kingston, New York. He is buried near the south-west corner of the Reformed Dutch Church Ground in Kingston.

== Sources ==
- Cemetery Register
- Bancker Ancestry
- Short Bio
- Political Graveyard
- Ancestry of Harold Arvid Cox Dahl

Political offices
Preceded by Walter Livingston	Speaker of the New York State Assembly; 1779–1783	Succeeded by John Hathorn
