= Charlotte County, Province of New York =

Former county in Province of New York

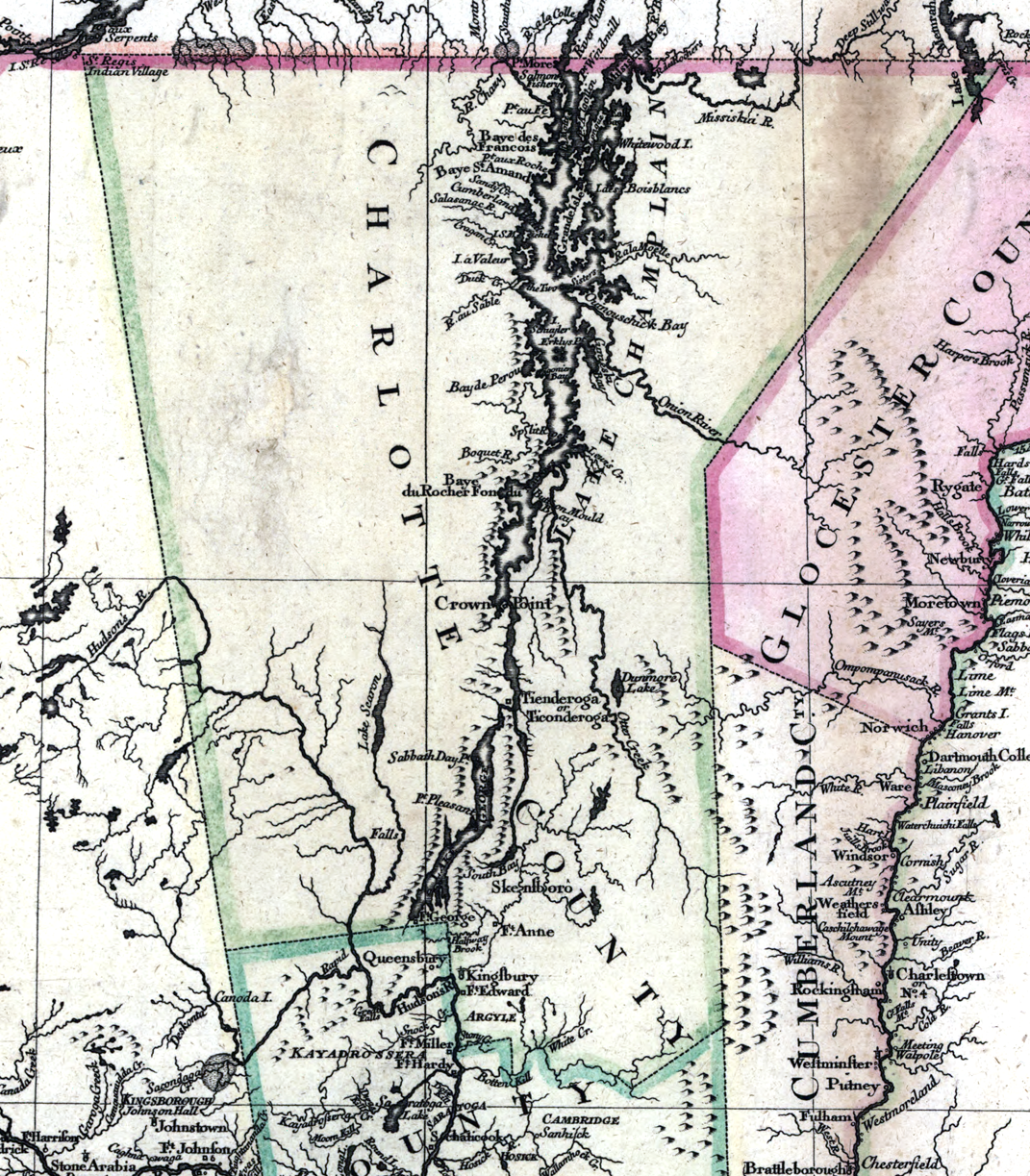
Charlotte County in 1777

Charlotte County was a county in the colonial Province of New York in the British American colonies. It was created from Albany County on March 24, 1772. The county was named for Charlotte of Mecklenburg-Strelitz, wife of George III of the United Kingdom. Its boundaries extended far further than any current county. Its western boundary ran from the northern boundary of Albany County to the Canada line, at a point near the old village of St. Regis. Its southern boundary was what is now the northern boundary of Saratoga County. Much of western Vermont, then claimed by New York, was also part of the county. Its northern border was also the Canada–US border. Its county seat was Fort Edward.

In 1777, the Vermont Republic claimed the eastern section of Charlotte County, in what is currently Vermont. This claim was largely ignored by New York's new state legislature, which voted on April 2, 1784, to change the name of all of Charlotte County to Washington County, NY, in honor of George Washington, stating, “From and after the passing of this act, the county of Tryon shall be called and known by the name of Montgomery, and the county of Charlotte by the name of Washington.” In 1791, Vermont became a state, taking that section of Charlotte County. In 1799 Clinton County was created from part of Washington County. Clinton County itself was partitioned to form other upstate counties. The Town of Cambridge was transferred in 1791 from Albany County to Washington County.

== See also ==
- List of former United States counties
- List of New York counties

== Bibliography ==
- Anderson, George Baker (1897). Landmarks of Rensselaer County New York. Syracuse, New York: D. Mason and Company. OCLC 1728151.
- Sylvester, Nathaniel Bartlett (1880). History of Rensselaer Co., New York with Illustrations and Biographical Sketches of its Prominent Men and Pioneers. Philadelphia: Everts & Peck. OCLC 3496287.
