= 9th New York State Legislature =

New York state legislative session

←	8th	10th	→
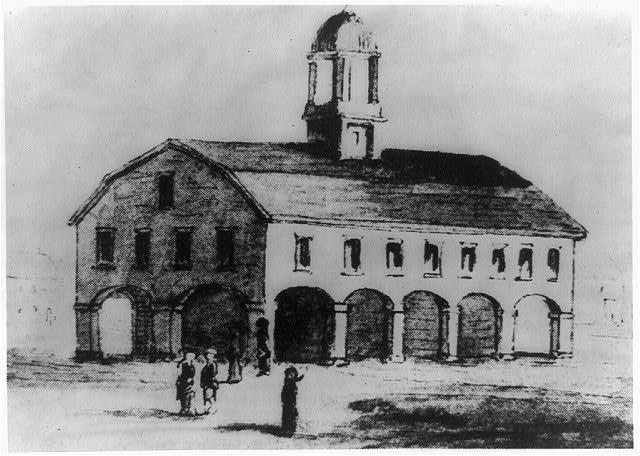
- The Old Royal Exchange, in New York City, where the Legislature met from 1785 to 1787. (undated)

Overview
- Legislative body: New York State Legislature
- Jurisdiction: New York, United States
- Term: July 1, 1785 – June 30, 1786

Senate
- Members: 24
- President: Lt. Gov. Pierre Van Cortlandt

Assembly
- Members: 70 (de facto 65)
- Speaker: John Lansing Jr.

Sessions
- 1st: January 12, 1786 – May 5, 1786

The 9th New York State Legislature, consisting of the New York State Senate and the New York State Assembly, met from January 12 to May 5, 1786, during the ninth year of George Clinton's governorship, at the Old Royal Exchange in New York City.

== Background ==
Under the provisions of the New York Constitution of 1777, the State Senators were elected on general tickets in the senatorial districts, and were then divided into four classes. Six senators each drew lots for a term of 1, 2, 3 or 4 years and, beginning at the election in April 1778, every year six Senate seats came up for election to a four-year term. Assemblymen were elected countywide on general tickets to a one-year term, the whole assembly being renewed annually.

The 8th New York State Legislature adjourned on April 27, 1785. At this time, the Senate voted that the next Legislature meet at Kingston, New York on a day set by the governor. The Assembly voted to meet at a time and place to be determined by the governor, to which the Senate then agreed. On November 16, 1785, Governor Clinton called the Legislature to meet on January 6, 1786, at the Exchange in New York City.

== Elections ==
The State election was held from April 26 to 28, 1785. Senator John Haring (Middle D.) was re-elected; and Thomas Tredwell (Southern D.), Volkert P. Douw, Philip Schuyler (both Western D.), and Assemblymen David Hopkins (Eastern D.) and Cornelius Humfrey (Middle D.), were elected to the Senate.

== Sessions ==
The State Legislature met at the Old Royal Exchange in New York City, the Assembly on January 12, the Senate on January 16, 1786; and both Houses adjourned on May 5.

When the Legislature eventually had assembled a quorum, Governor Clinton told them that, following the principle of Separation of Powers, the Governor could call the Legislature only for special sessions, but the Legislature should henceforth decide for themselves where and when to meet for the next ordinary session, and suggested to pass a law for this purpose. On March 13, 1786, the Legislature enacted that future Legislatures meet on the first Tuesday of January of each year unless called earlier by the governor. However, no general meeting place was determined, leaving it for the time being to each Legislature to name the place where to reconvene, and if no place could be agreed upon, the Legislature should meet again where it adjourned.

== State Senate ==
=== Districts ===
- The Southern District (9 seats) consisted of Kings, New York, Queens, Richmond, Suffolk and Westchester counties.
- The Middle District (6 seats) consisted of Dutchess, Orange and Ulster counties.
- The Eastern District (3 seats) consisted of Washington, Cumberland and Gloucester counties.
- The Western District (6 seats) consisted of Albany and Montgomery counties.

Note: There are now 62 counties in the State of New York. The counties which are not mentioned in this list had not yet been established, or sufficiently organized, the area being included in one or more of the abovementioned counties.

=== Members ===
The asterisk (*) denotes members of the previous Legislature who continued in office as members of this Legislature. Cornelius Humfrey and David Hopkins changed from the Assembly to the Senate.

District	Senators	Term left	Notes
Southern	Lewis Morris*	1 year	elected to the Council of Appointment
Southern	Isaac Roosevelt*	1 year	
Southern	Isaac Stoutenburgh*	2 years	
Southern	Samuel Townsend*	2 years	
Southern	Stephen Ward*	2 years	
Southern	William Floyd*	3 years	
Southern	Ezra L'Hommedieu*	3 years	
Southern	Alexander McDougall*	3 years	died on June 9, 1786
Southern	Thomas Tredwell	4 years	
Middle	William Allison*	1 year	
Middle	Joseph Gasherie*	2 years	
Middle	Jacobus Swartwout*	2 years	elected to the Council of Appointment
Middle	Arthur Parks*	3 years	
Middle	John Haring*	4 years	
Middle	(Cornelius Humfrey)*	4 years	did not attend
Eastern	John Williams*	1 year	
Eastern	Ebenezer Russell*	3 years	
Eastern	David Hopkins*	4 years	elected to the Council of Appointment
Western	(Jacob G. Klock)*	1 year	did not attend
Western	Abraham Yates Jr.*	1 year	
Western	Andrew Finck*	2 years	
Western	Peter Van Ness*	3 years	
Western	Volkert P. Douw	4 years	
Western	Philip Schuyler	4 years	elected to the Council of Appointment

=== Employees ===
- Clerk: Abraham B. Bancker

== State Assembly ==
=== Districts ===
- The City and County of Albany (10 seats)
- Cumberland County (3 seats)
- Dutchess County (7 seats)
- Gloucester County (2 seats)
- Kings County (2 seats)
- Montgomery County) (6 seats)
- The City and County of New York (9 seats)
- Orange County (4 seats)
- Queens County (4 seats)
- Richmond County (2 seats)
- Suffolk County (5 seats)
- Ulster County (6 seats)
- Washington County (4 seats)
- Westchester County (6 seats)

Note: There are now 62 counties in the State of New York. The counties which are not mentioned in this list had not yet been established, or sufficiently organized, the area being included in one or more of the abovementioned counties.

=== Assemblymen ===
The asterisk (*) denotes members of the previous Legislature who continued as members of this Legislature.

County	Assemblymen	Notes
Albany	Leonard Bronck	
Albany	Henry Glen	
Albany	James Gordon	
Albany	Lawrence Hogeboom	
Albany	John Lansing Jr.	elected Speaker
Albany	John Livingston	
Albany	Jacobus Van Schoonhoven	
Albany	John Tayler	
Albany	Abraham J. Van Alstyne	
Albany	Peter Vrooman	
Cumberland	none	No election returns from these counties
Gloucester	none	No election returns from these counties
Dutchess	Dirck Brinckerhoff*	
Dutchess	John DeWitt	
Dutchess	Lewis DuBois	
Dutchess	Jacob Griffin	
Dutchess	Henry Ludington	
Dutchess	Brinton Paine*	
Dutchess	Matthew Patterson*	
Kings	Charles Doughty*	
Kings	John Vanderbilt*	
Montgomery	Abraham Arndt	
Montgomery	John Frey	
Montgomery	William Harper*	
Montgomery	James Livingston*	
Montgomery	Abraham Van Horne	
Montgomery	Volkert Veeder*	
New York	Evert Bancker	
New York	Robert Boyd	
New York	William Denning*	
New York	William Duer	
New York	William Goforth*	
New York	William Malcom	
New York	Isaac Sears	
New York	John Stagg	
New York	Robert Troup	
Orange	John Bradner	
Orange	Gilbert Cooper*	
Orange	Nathaniel Satterly	
Orange	Henry Wisner III	
Queens	Daniel Duryee	
Queens	Samuel Jones	
Queens	Daniel Whitehead Kissam	
Queens	James Townsend*	
Richmond	John C. Dongan	
Richmond	Joshua Mersereau*	
Suffolk	Nathaniel Gardiner	
Suffolk	John Nicoll Havens	
Suffolk	David Hedges	
Suffolk	Jeffrey Smith*	
Suffolk	Thomas Youngs*	
Ulster	David Galatian	
Ulster	Joseph Hasbrouck	
Ulster	Thomas Jansen	
Ulster	Cornelius C. Schoonmaker*	
Ulster	Nathan Smith*	
Ulster	Johannis Snyder	
Washington	Albert Baker*	
Washington	Joseph McCracken	
Washington	Ichabod Parker	
Washington	Peter B. Tierce	
Westchester	Samuel Drake	
Westchester	Abijah Gilbert*	
Westchester	Ebenezer Lockwood*	
Westchester	Philip Pell Jr.*	
Westchester	Thomas Thomas*	
Westchester	Jonathan G. Tompkins	

=== Employees ===
- Clerk: John McKesson

== Sources ==
- The New York Civil List compiled by Franklin Benjamin Hough (Weed, Parsons and Co., 1858) [see pg. 108 for Senate districts; pg. 113 for senators; pg. 148f for Assembly districts; pg. 162f for assemblymen]
