= 10th New York State Legislature =

New York state legislative session

←	9th	11th	→
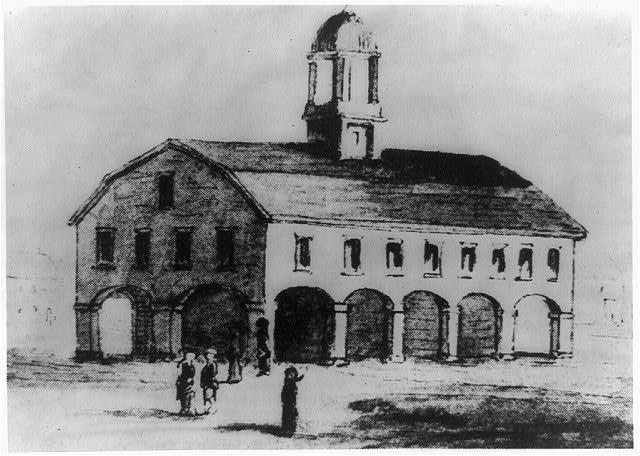
- The Old Royal Exchange, in New York City, where the Legislature met from 1785 to 1787. (undated)

Overview
- Legislative body: New York State Legislature
- Jurisdiction: New York, United States
- Term: July 1, 1786 – June 30, 1787

Senate
- Members: 24
- President: Lt. Gov. Pierre Van Cortlandt

Assembly
- Members: 70 (de facto 65)
- Speaker: Richard Varick

Sessions
- 1st: January 12, 1787 – April 21, 1787

The 10th New York State Legislature, consisting of the New York State Senate and the New York State Assembly, met from January 12 to April 21, 1787, during the tenth year of George Clinton's governorship, at the Old Royal Exchange in New York City.

== Background ==
Under the provisions of the New York Constitution of 1777, the State Senators were elected on general tickets in the senatorial districts, and were then divided into four classes. Six senators each drew lots for a term of 1, 2, 3 or 4 years and, beginning at the election in April 1778, every year six Senate seats came up for election to a four-year term. Assemblymen were elected countywide on general tickets to a one-year term, the whole assembly being renewed annually.

In March 1786, the Legislature enacted that future Legislatures meet on the first Tuesday of January of each year unless called earlier by the governor. No general meeting place was determined, leaving it to each Legislature to name the place where to reconvene, and if no place could be agreed upon, the Legislature should meet again where it adjourned.

== Elections ==
The State election was held from April 25 to 27, 1786. Gov. George Clinton and Lt. Gov. Pierre Van Cortlandt were re-elected to a fourth term. Senators Lewis Morris (Southern D.), John Williams (Eastern D.) and Abraham Yates Jr. (Western D.) were re-elected; and John Hathorn (Middle D.), Peter Schuyler (Western D.) and Assemblyman John Vanderbilt (Southern D.), were elected to the Senate.

== Sessions ==
The State Legislature was to meet on January 2, 1787, at the Old Royal Exchange in New York City, but the Assembly first assembled a quorum on January 12, the Senate on January 13; both Houses adjourned on April 21, 1787.

== State Senate ==
=== Districts ===
- The Southern District (9 seats) consisted of Kings, New York, Queens, Richmond, Suffolk and Westchester counties.
- The Middle District (6 seats) consisted of Dutchess, Orange and Ulster counties.
- The Eastern District (3 seats) consisted of Washington, Cumberland and Gloucester counties.
- The Western District (6 seats) consisted of Albany and Montgomery counties.

Note: There are now 62 counties in the State of New York. The counties which are not mentioned in this list had not yet been established, or sufficiently organized, the area being included in one or more of the abovementioned counties.

=== Members ===
The asterisk (*) denotes members of the previous Legislature who continued in office as members of this Legislature. John Vanderbilt changed from the Assembly to the Senate.

District	Senators	Term left	Notes
Southern	Isaac Stoutenburgh*	1 year	
Southern	Samuel Townsend*	1 year	
Southern	Stephen Ward*	1 year	
Southern	William Floyd*	2 years	elected to the Council of Appointment
Southern	Ezra L'Hommedieu*	2 years	
Southern	vacant	2 years	Alexander McDougall died on June 9, 1786.
Southern	Thomas Tredwell*	3 years	
Southern	Lewis Morris*	4 years	
Southern	John Vanderbilt*	4 years	
Middle	Joseph Gasherie*	1 year	
Middle	Jacobus Swartwout*	1 year	
Middle	Arthur Parks*	2 years	
Middle	John Haring*	3 years	
Middle	Cornelius Humfrey*	3 years	
Middle	John Hathorn	4 years	elected to the Council of Appointment
Eastern	Ebenezer Russell*	2 years	elected to the Council of Appointment
Eastern	David Hopkins*	3 years	
Eastern	John Williams*	4 years	
Western	Andrew Finck*	1 year	
Western	Peter Van Ness*	2 years	
Western	Volkert P. Douw*	3 years	
Western	Philip Schuyler*	3 years	
Western	Peter Schuyler	4 years	elected to the Council of Appointment
Western	Abraham Yates Jr.*	4 years	

=== Employees ===
- Clerk: Abraham B. Bancker

== State Assembly ==
=== Districts ===
- The City and County of Albany (10 seats)
- Cumberland County (3 seats)
- Dutchess County (7 seats)
- Gloucester County (2 seats)
- Kings County (2 seats)
- Montgomery County) (6 seats)
- The City and County of New York (9 seats)
- Orange County (4 seats)
- Queens County (4 seats)
- Richmond County (2 seats)
- Suffolk County (5 seats)
- Ulster County (6 seats)
- Washington County (4 seats)
- Westchester County (6 seats)

Note: There are now 62 counties in the State of New York. The counties which are not mentioned in this list had not yet been established, or sufficiently organized, the area being included in one or more of the abovementioned counties.

=== Assemblymen ===
The asterisk (*) denotes members of the previous Legislature who continued as members of this Legislature.

County	Assemblymen	Notes
Albany	Leonard Bronck*	
Albany	Henry Glen*	
Albany	James Gordon*	
Albany	John Lansing Jr.*	also Mayor of Albany
Albany	John Livingston*	
Albany	William Powers	
Albany	Thomas Sickles	
Albany	John Tayler*	
Albany	Matthew Visscher	
Albany	Peter Vrooman*	
Cumberland	none	No election returns from these counties
Gloucester	none	No election returns from these counties
Dutchess	Dirck Brinckerhoff*	
Dutchess	John DeWitt Jr.	
Dutchess	Lewis DuBois*	
Dutchess	Jacob Griffin*	
Dutchess	Henry Ludington*	
Dutchess	Brinton Paine*	
Dutchess	Matthew Patterson*	
Kings	Charles Doughty*	
Kings	Cornelius Wyckoff	
Montgomery	Zephaniah Batchelor	
Montgomery	James Cannon	
Montgomery	Josiah Crane	
Montgomery	John Frey*	
Montgomery	William Harper*	
Montgomery	James Livingston*	
New York	Evert Bancker*	
New York	Nicholas Bayard	
New York	David Brooks	
New York	William Denning*	
New York	Alexander Hamilton	
New York	Robert C. Livingston	
New York	William Malcom*	
New York	John Ray	
New York	Richard Varick	elected Speaker; also Recorder of New York City
Orange	Robert Armstrong	
Orange	Jeremiah Clark	
Orange	Gilbert Cooper*	
Orange	Peter Taulman	
Queens	Samuel Jones*	
Queens	John Schenck	
Queens	Richard Thorne	
Queens	James Townsend*	
Richmond	John C. Dongan*	
Richmond	Thomas Frost	
Suffolk	Jonathan N. Havens	
Suffolk	David Hedges*	
Suffolk	Daniel Osborn	
Suffolk	Caleb Smith	
Suffolk	John Smith	
Ulster	John Cantine	
Ulster	Ebenezer Clark	
Ulster	David Galatian*	
Ulster	Cornelius C. Schoonmaker*	
Ulster	Nathan Smith*	
Ulster	Johannis Snyder*	
Washington	Adam Martin	
Washington	Ichabod Parker*	
Washington	Edward Savage	
Washington	Peter B. Tierce*	
Westchester	Ebenezer Lockwood*	
Westchester	Ebenezer Purdy	
Westchester	Nathan Rockwell	
Westchester	Joseph Strang	
Westchester	Thomas Thomas*	
Westchester	Jonathan G. Tompkins*	

=== Employees ===
- Clerk: John McKesson

== Sources ==
- The New York Civil List compiled by Franklin Benjamin Hough (Weed, Parsons and Co., 1858) [see pg. 108 for Senate districts; pg. 113 for senators; pg. 148f for Assembly districts; pg. 163 for assemblymen]
