= 12th New York State Legislature =

New York state legislative session

←	11th	13th	→
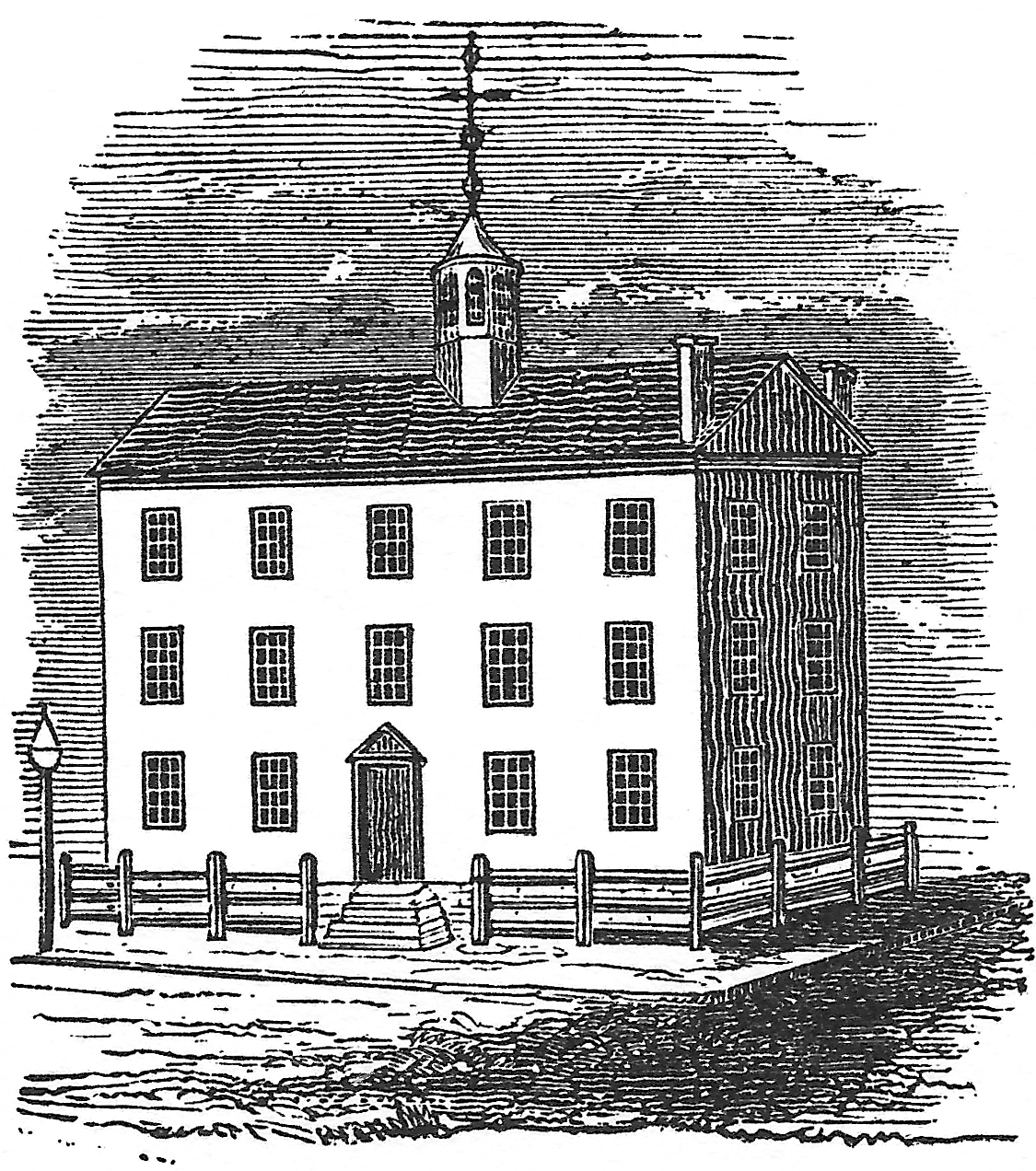
- The Old Albany City Hall, where the Legislature met from 1788 to 1789 (undated)

Overview
- Legislative body: New York State Legislature
- Jurisdiction: New York, United States
- Term: July 1, 1788 – June 30, 1789

Senate
- Members: 24
- President: Lt. Gov. Pierre Van Cortlandt

Assembly
- Members: 70 (de facto 65)
- Speaker: John Lansing Jr.

Sessions
- 1st: December 11, 1788 – March 3, 1789

The 12th New York State Legislature, consisting of the New York State Senate and the New York State Assembly, met from December 11, 1788, to March 3, 1789, during the twelfth year of George Clinton's governorship, in Albany.

== Background ==
Under the provisions of the New York Constitution of 1777, the State Senators were elected on general tickets in the senatorial districts, and were then divided into four classes. Six senators each drew lots for a term of 1, 2, 3 or 4 years and, beginning at the election in April 1778, every year six Senate seats came up for election to a four-year term. Assemblymen were elected countywide on general tickets to a one-year term, the whole assembly being renewed annually.

In March 1786, the Legislature enacted that future Legislatures meet on the first Tuesday of January of each year unless called earlier by the governor. No general meeting place was determined, leaving it to each Legislature to name the place where to reconvene, and if no place could be agreed upon, the Legislature should meet again where it adjourned.

== Elections ==
The State election was held from April 29 to May 1, 1788. Senators Ezra L'Hommedieu (Southern D.) and Peter Van Ness (Western D.) were re-elected; and Paul Micheau, Isaac Roosevelt (both Southern D.), and Assemblyman James Clinton (Middle D.) were also elected to the Senate. Assemblyman Edward Savage (Eastern D.) may have been elected at the same time to the State Senate (Eastern D.) and to the Assembly (Washington Co.) but was seated in the Assembly; the Senate seat vacated by the expiration of Ebenezer Russell's term remained vacant.

At the same time, delegates to a Convention to deliberate upon the adoption of the U.S. Constitution were elected. This was the first time that the politicians were divided into two opposing political parties: those who advocated the creation of a stronger federal government and the adoption of the US Constitution, as drafted, were henceforth known as Federalists, those who advocated stronger State governments and demanded many changes to the proposed Constitution as Anti-Federalists, or Democratic-Republicans.

== Sessions ==
The Convention met from June 17 to July 26, 1788, at Poughkeepsie, and ratified the U.S. Constitution by a vote of 30 to 27.

The State Legislature met on December 11, 1788, at the Old City Hall in Albany; and adjourned on March 3, 1789.

On January 27, 1789, the Legislature divided the State of New York into six congressional districts, and the first congressional elections in New York were held on March 3 and 4, 1789.

In February and March 1789, the Legislature debated at length "An act for prescribing the times, places and manner of holding elections for Senators of the United States of America, to be chosen in this State" but the Anti-Federalist Assembly majority and the Federalist Senate majority could not agree, and they adjourned without having elected U.S. Senators. Both parties hoped to win the next State election, to be held in April 1789, and agreed to adjourn earlier than usual, leaving it to the new members to find a way out of the deadlock.

== State Senate ==
=== Districts ===
- The Southern District (9 seats) consisted of Kings, New York, Queens, Richmond, Suffolk and Westchester counties.
- The Middle District (6 seats) consisted of Dutchess, Orange and Ulster counties.
- The Eastern District (3 seats) consisted of Washington, Cumberland and Gloucester counties.
- The Western District (6 seats) consisted of Albany, Columbia and Montgomery counties.

Note: There are now 62 counties in the State of New York. The counties which are not mentioned in this list had not yet been established, or sufficiently organized, the area being included in one or more of the abovementioned counties.

=== Members ===
The asterisk (*) denotes members of the previous Legislature who continued in office as members of this Legislature. James Clinton changed from the Assembly to the Senate. The vote of the members of this Legislature who had been delegates to the US Constitution ratifying convention is marked either "For ratification" or "Against ratification".

District	Senators	Term left	Party	Notes
Southern	Thomas Tredwell*	1 year	Anti-Fed.	Against ratification
Southern	Lewis Morris*	2 years	Federalist	For ratification
Southern	John Vanderbilt*	2 years	Federalist	
Southern	James Duane*	3 years	Federalist	For ratification
Southern	John Laurance*	3 years	Federalist	elected on March 3–4, 1789, to the 1st United States Congress
Southern	Samuel Townsend*	3 years	Anti-Fed.	elected to the Council of Appointment
Southern	Ezra L'Hommedieu*	4 years	Fed./Anti-Fed.	L'Hommedieu ran on both tickets for re-election, but was at this time "clearly a Federalist"
Southern	Paul Micheau	4 years	Federalist	
Southern	Isaac Roosevelt	4 years	Federalist	For ratification
Middle	John Haring*	1 year	Anti-Fed.	Against ratification
Middle	Cornelius Humfrey*	1 year		
Middle	John Hathorn*	2 years	Anti-Fed.	elected to the Council of Appointment; elected on March 3–4, 1789, to the 1st United States Congress
Middle	Anthony Hoffman*	3 years	Federalist	
Middle	Jacobus Swartwout*	3 years	Anti-Fed.	Against ratification
Middle	James Clinton*	4 years	Anti-Fed.	Against ratification
Eastern	David Hopkins*	1 year	Anti-Fed.	Against ratification
Eastern	John Williams*	2 years	Anti-Fed.	Against ratification; elected to the Council of Appointment
Eastern	vacant	4 years		Edward Savage is listed in the Civil List of 1858, but he was seated in the Assembly during this session.
Western	Volkert P. Douw*	1 year		
Western	Philip Schuyler*	1 year	Federalist	
Western	Peter Schuyler*	2 years	Federalist	
Western	Abraham Yates Jr.*	2 years	Anti-Fed.	
Western	Jellis Fonda*	3 years		
Western	Peter Van Ness*	4 years	Anti-Fed.	Against ratification; elected to the Council of Appointment

=== Employees ===
- Clerk: Abraham B. Bancker

== State Assembly ==
=== Districts ===
- The City and County of Albany (7 seats)
- Columbia County (3 seats)
- Cumberland County (3 seats)
- Dutchess County (7 seats)
- Gloucester County (2 seats)
- Kings County (2 seats)
- Montgomery County) (6 seats)
- The City and County of New York (9 seats)
- Orange County (4 seats)
- Queens County (4 seats)
- Richmond County (2 seats)
- Suffolk County (5 seats)
- Ulster County (6 seats)
- Washington County (4 seats)
- Westchester County (6 seats)

Note: There are now 62 counties in the State of New York. The counties which are not mentioned in this list had not yet been established, or sufficiently organized, the area being included in one or more of the abovementioned counties.

=== Assemblymen ===
The asterisk (*) denotes members of the previous Legislature who continued as members of this Legislature. The vote of the members of this Legislature who had been delegates to the US Constitution ratifying convention is marked either "For ratification" or "Against ratification".

County	Assemblymen	Party	Notes
Albany	John Duncan	Anti-Fed.	
Albany	John Lansing Jr.	Anti-Fed.	elected Speaker; also Mayor of Albany; Against ratification
Albany	John Thompson	Anti-Fed.	
Albany	Cornelius Van Dyck	Anti-Fed.	
Albany	Henry K. Van Rensselaer	Anti-Fed.	
Albany	Jeremiah Van Rensselaer	Anti-Fed.	
Albany	John Younglove*	Fed./Anti-Fed.	Younglove ran on both tickets
Columbia	Matthew Adgate	Anti-Fed.	Against ratification
Columbia	John Bay	Anti-Fed.	Against ratification; previously a member from Albany Co.
Columbia	John Kortz	Anti-Fed.	
Cumberland	none		No election returns from these counties
Gloucester	none		No election returns from these counties
Dutchess County	Jonathan Akins	Anti-Fed.	Against ratification
Dutchess County	Samuel A. Barker	Fed./Anti-Fed.	Barker ran on both tickets
Dutchess County	Isaac Bloom*	Fed./Anti-Fed.	Bloom ran on both tickets
Dutchess County	John DeWitt Jr.*	Anti-Fed.	For ratification
Dutchess County	Jacob Griffin	Anti-Fed.	
Dutchess County	Gilbert Livingston	Federalist	For ratification
Dutchess County	Matthew Patterson*		
Kings	Aquila Giles		
Kings	Peter Vandervoort	Federalist	For ratification
Montgomery	John Frey*	Anti-Fed.	Against ratification
Montgomery	William Harper	Anti-Fed.	Against ratification
Montgomery	Henry Staring	Anti-Fed.	Against ratification
Montgomery	Volkert Veeder*	Anti-Fed.	Against ratification
Montgomery	John Winn*	Anti-Fed.	Against ratification
Montgomery	Christopher P. Yates	Anti-Fed.	
New York	William W. Gilbert		
New York	Richard Harison*	Federalist	
New York	Nicholas Hoffman	Federalist	
New York	Henry Brockholst Livingston		
New York	Nicholas Low*	Federalist	
New York	Alexander Macomb		
New York	Comfort Sands*	Federalist	
New York	Gulian Verplanck*	Federalist	
New York	John Watts Jr.	Federalist	
Orange	John Carpenter	Anti-Fed.	
Orange	Jeremiah Clark*	Anti-Fed.	
Orange	Henry Wisner Jr.*	Anti-Fed.	
Orange	vacant		The election was tied in fourth place: the incumbent Peter Taulman (A.-F.) and James Post (Fed.) received 128 votes each, thus there was "no choice."
Queens	Stephen Carman*	Anti-Fed.	For ratification
Queens	Whitehead Cornwell*	Anti-Fed.	For ratification
Queens	Samuel Jones*	Anti-Fed.	For ratification
Queens	John Schenck	Anti-Fed.	For ratification
Richmond	Abraham Bancker	Federalist	For ratification
Richmond	John C. Dongan*	Anti-Fed.	
Suffolk	Nathaniel Gardiner	Federalist	
Suffolk	Jonathan N. Havens*	Anti-Fed.	For ratification
Suffolk	David Hedges*	Anti-Fed.	
Suffolk	Henry Scudder	Anti-Fed.	For ratification
Suffolk	John Smith*	Anti-Fed.	For ratification
Ulster	John Cantine*	Anti-Fed.	Against ratification
Ulster	Ebenezer Clark	Anti-Fed.	Against ratification
Ulster	Johannes G. Hardenbergh	Anti-Fed.	
Ulster	Cornelius C. Schoonmaker*	Anti-Fed.	Against ratification
Ulster	Nathan Smith*	Anti-Fed.	
Ulster	Christopher Tappen	Anti-Fed.	
Washington	Joseph McCracken	Anti-Fed.	
Washington	Edward Savage*	Anti-Fed.	
Washington	Peter B. Tearse*	Anti-Fed.	
Washington	Alexander Webster*	Anti-Fed.	
Westchester	Thaddeus Crane	Federalist	For ratification
Westchester	Jonathan Horton	Federalist	
Westchester	Philip Livingston	Federalist	For ratification
Westchester	Nathan Rockwell	Federalist	
Westchester	Walter Seaman	Federalist	
Westchester	Philip Van Cortlandt	Federalist	For ratification

=== Employees ===
- Clerk: John McKesson

== Sources ==
- The New York Civil List compiled by Franklin Benjamin Hough (Weed, Parsons and Co., 1858) [see pg. 108 for Senate districts; pg. 113f for senators; pg. 148f for Assembly districts; pg. 164f for assemblymen; pg. 54f for U.S. Constitution ratifying convention]
- Election result Assembly, Albany Co. at project "A New Nation Votes", compiled by Phil Lampi, hosted by Tufts University Digital Library
- Election result Assembly, Columbia Co. at project "A New Nation Votes"
- Election result Assembly, Orange Co. at project "A New Nation Votes"
- Election result Assembly, Queens Co. at project "A New Nation Votes"
