= 8th New York State Legislature =

New York state legislative session

←	7th	9th	→
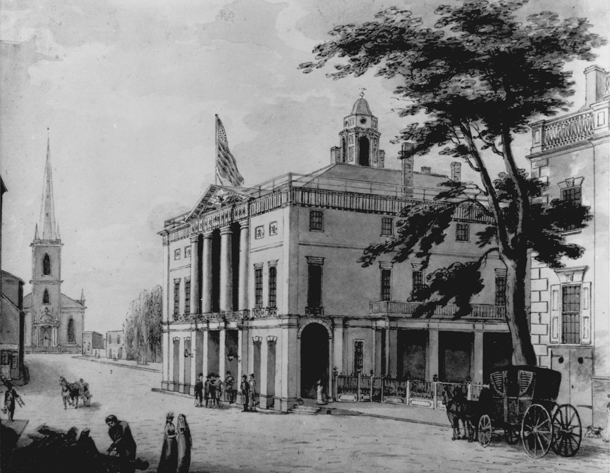
- The Old New York City Hall, where the Legislature met in 1784. From January 1785 on, the Congress of the Confederation met here, and later it was the venue of the first two sessions of the 1st United States Congress. The building was then renamed Federal Hall and demolished in 1812. (1798)

Overview
- Legislative body: New York State Legislature
- Jurisdiction: New York, United States
- Term: July 1, 1784 – June 30, 1785

Senate
- Members: 24
- President: Lt. Gov. Pierre Van Cortlandt

Assembly
- Members: 70 (de facto 65)
- Speaker: David Gelston

Sessions
- 1st: October 12, 1784 – November 29, 1784
- 2nd: January 24, 1785 – April 27, 1785

The 8th New York State Legislature, consisting of the New York State Senate and the New York State Assembly, met from October 12, 1784, to April 27, 1785, during the eighth year of George Clinton's governorship, at New York City.

== Background ==
Under the provisions of the New York Constitution of 1777, the State Senators were elected on general tickets in the senatorial districts, and were then divided into four classes. Six senators each drew lots for a term of 1, 2, 3 or 4 years and, beginning at the election in April 1778, every year six Senate seats came up for election to a four-year term. Assemblymen were elected countywide on general tickets to a one-year term, the whole assembly being renewed annually.

== Elections ==
The State election was held from April 27 to 29, 1784. Senators William Floyd, Ezra L'Hommedieu, Alexander McDougall (all Southern D.), and Arthur Parks (Middle D.) were re-elected; and Assemblyman Peter Van Ness (Western D.) was elected to the Senate.

== Sessions ==
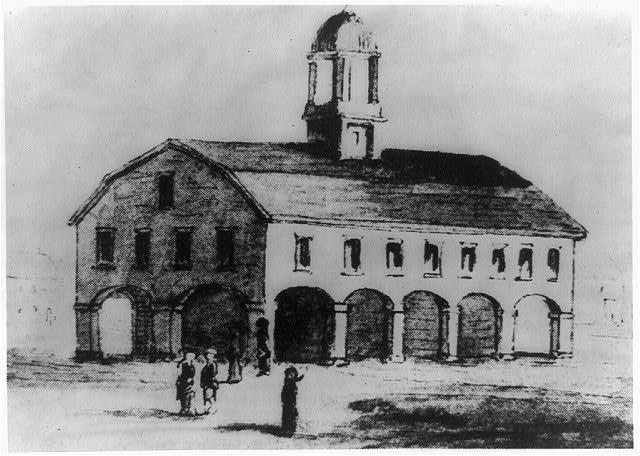
The Old Royal Exchange, in New York City, where the Legislature met in 1785.

The State Legislature first met at the Old City Hall in New York City, the Assembly on October 12, the Senate on October 18, 1784; and both Houses adjourned on November 29. In January 1785, the Congress of the Confederation met at the Old City Hall, New York City thus becoming the federal capital of the United States. When the Legislature met again, it moved to the Exchange on the corner of Broad and Water streets in New York City; the Senate met on January 24, the Assembly on January 27, 1785; and both Houses adjourned on April 27.

== State Senate ==
=== Districts ===
- The Southern District (9 seats) consisted of Kings, New York, Queens, Richmond, Suffolk and Westchester counties.
- The Middle District (6 seats) consisted of Dutchess, Orange and Ulster counties.
- The Eastern District (3 seats) consisted of Washington, Cumberland and Gloucester counties.
- The Western District (6 seats) consisted of Albany and Montgomery counties.

Note: There are now 62 counties in the State of New York. The counties which are not mentioned in this list had not yet been established, or sufficiently organized, the area being included in one or more of the abovementioned counties.

=== Senators ===
The asterisk (*) denotes members of the previous Legislature who continued in office as members of this Legislature. Ebenezer Russell and Peter Van Ness changed from the Assembly to the Senate.

District	Senators	Term left	Notes
Southern	James Duane*	1 year	also Mayor of New York City
Southern	Lewis Morris*	2 years	
Southern	Isaac Roosevelt*	2 years	elected to the Council of Appointment
Southern	Isaac Stoutenburgh*	3 years	
Southern	Samuel Townsend*	3 years	
Southern	Stephen Ward*	3 years	
Southern	William Floyd*	4 years	
Southern	Ezra L'Hommedieu*	4 years	
Southern	Alexander McDougall*	4 years	
Middle	John Haring*	1 year	
Middle	Ephraim Paine*	1 year	
Middle	William Allison*	2 years	
Middle	Joseph Gasherie*	3 years	elected to the Council of Appointment
Middle	Jacobus Swartwout*	3 years	
Middle	Arthur Parks*	4 years	
Eastern	Alexander Webster*	1 year	
Eastern	John Williams*	2 years	
Eastern	Ebenezer Russell*	4 years	elected to the Council of Appointment
Western	Henry Oothoudt*	1 year	
Western	William B. Whiting*	1 years	elected to the Council of Appointment
Western	Jacob G. Klock*	2 years	
Western	Abraham Yates Jr.*	2 years	
Western	Andrew Finck*	3 years	
Western	Peter Van Ness*	4 years	

=== Employees ===
- Clerk: Abraham B. Bancker

== State Assembly ==
=== Districts ===
- The City and County of Albany (10 seats)
- Cumberland County (3 seats)
- Dutchess County (7 seats)
- Gloucester County (2 seats)
- Kings County (2 seats)
- Montgomery County) (6 seats)
- The City and County of New York (9 seats)
- Orange County (4 seats)
- Queens County (4 seats)
- Richmond County (2 seats)
- Suffolk County (5 seats)
- Ulster County (6 seats)
- Washington County (4 seats)
- Westchester County (6 seats)

Note: There are now 62 counties in the State of New York. The counties which are not mentioned in this list had not yet been established, or sufficiently organized, the area being included in one or more of the abovementioned counties.

=== Assemblymen ===
The asterisk (*) denotes members of the previous Legislature who continued as members of this Legislature.

County	Assemblymen	Notes
Albany	Matthew Adgate*	
Albany	Abraham Becker*	
Albany	Jacob Ford*	
Albany	Walter Livingston	
Albany	Dirck Swart*	
Albany	Israel Thompson	
Albany	Matthew Visscher	
Albany	Christopher Yates*	
Albany	Peter W. Yates	
Albany	John Younglove	
Cumberland	none	No election returns from these counties
Gloucester	none	No election returns from these counties
Dutchess	Abraham Brinckerhoff	
Dutchess	Dirck Brinckerhoff*	
Dutchess	Ebenezer Cary	
Dutchess	Cornelius Humfrey*	
Dutchess	Brinton Paine	
Dutchess	Matthew Patterson*	
Dutchess	James Tallmadge	
Kings	Charles Doughty	
Kings	John Vanderbilt	
Montgomery	Frederick C. Fox	
Montgomery	William Harper*	
Montgomery	James Livingston*	
Montgomery	Isaac Paris*	
Montgomery	Volkert Veeder*	
Montgomery	Christopher P. Yates*	
New York	Aaron Burr	
New York	William Denning	
New York	Daniel Dunscomb	
New York	William Goforth	
New York	John Laurance	previously a member from Westchester Co.
New York	Peter Van Brugh Livingston	
New York	Thomas Randall	
New York	Henry Remsen	
New York	Comfort Sands	
Orange	Jeremiah Clark*	
Orange	Gilbert Cooper*	
Orange	John Hathorn*	
Orange	William Sickles*	
Queens	Joseph Lawrence	
Queens	John Sands	
Queens	Abraham Skinner	
Queens	James Townsend*	
Richmond	Cornelius Corsen	
Richmond	Joshua Mersereau	
Suffolk	David Gelston*	elected Speaker
Suffolk	Ebenezer Platt*	
Suffolk	Jeffrey Smith*	
Suffolk	John Smith	
Suffolk	Thomas Youngs*	
Ulster	John Cantine*	
Ulster	Charles DeWitt*	
Ulster	Johannes G. Hardenbergh	
Ulster	John Nicholson*	
Ulster	Cornelius C. Schoonmaker*	
Ulster	Nathan Smith*	
Washington	Albert Baker	
Washington	David Hopkins*	
Washington	Edward Savage*	
Washington	Abiel Sherwood	
Westchester	Ebenezer S. Burling	
Westchester	Abijah Gilbert*	
Westchester	Ebenezer Lockwood	
Westchester	Philip Pell Jr.*	
Westchester	Ebenezer Purdy*	
Westchester	Thomas Thomas*	

=== Employees ===
- Clerk: John McKesson

== Notes ==
Some confusion still exists as to Speaker; New York Packet of 10/25/1784 printed a letter to Clinton from the Assembly in response to his address, and Hathorn is shown as the author and title is Speaker.

== Sources ==
- The New York Civil List compiled by Franklin Benjamin Hough (Weed, Parsons and Co., 1858) [see pg. 108 for Senate districts; pg. 112f for senators; pg. 148f for Assembly districts; pg. 162 for assemblymen]
