= 11th New York State Legislature =

New York state legislative session

←	10th	12th	→
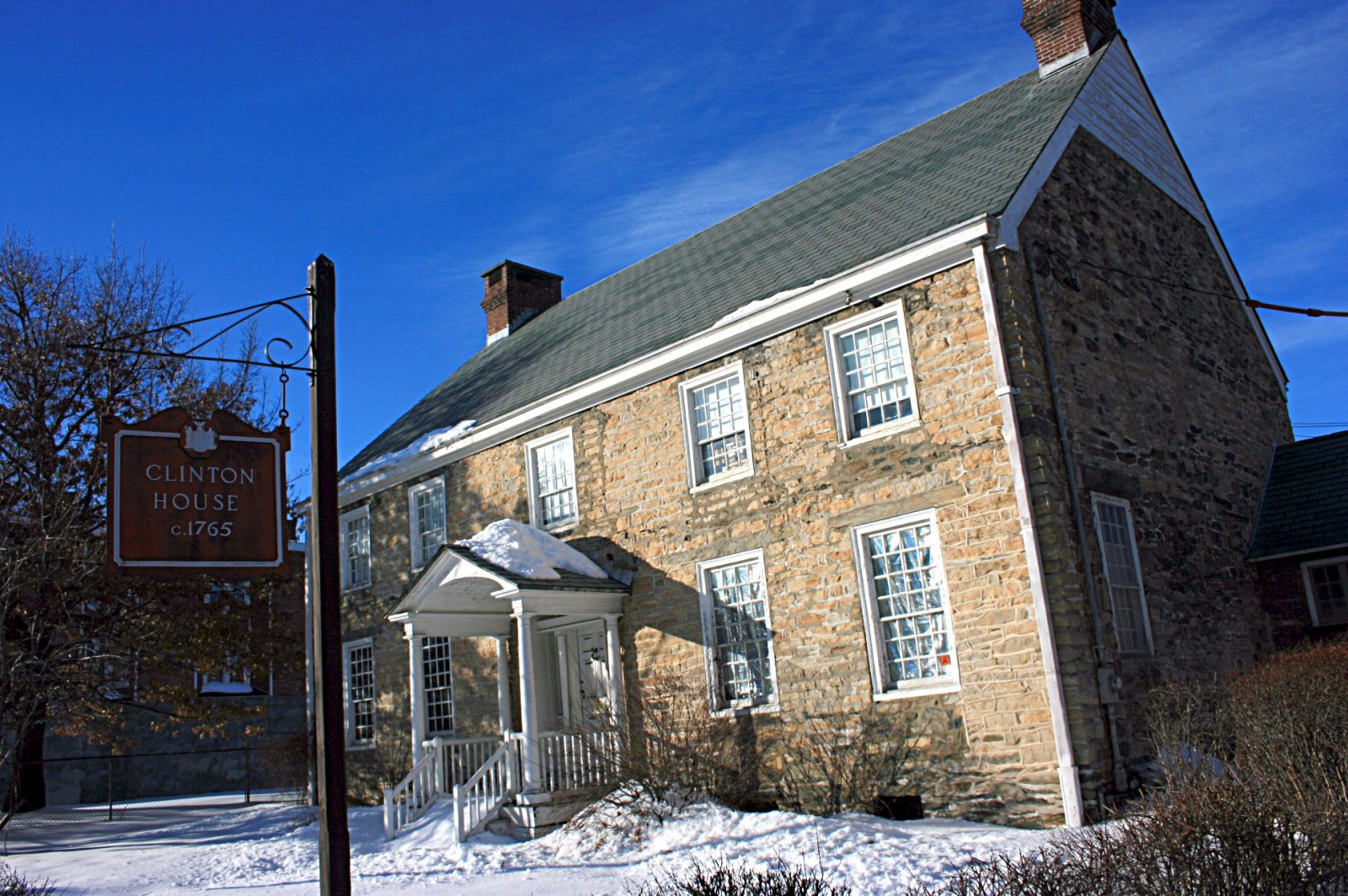
- Clinton House, one of the buildings used by the State government during sessions at Poughkeepsie (2007)

Overview
- Legislative body: New York State Legislature
- Jurisdiction: New York, United States
- Term: July 1, 1787 – June 30, 1788

Senate
- Members: 24
- President: Lt. Gov. Pierre Van Cortlandt

Assembly
- Members: 70 (de facto 65)
- Speaker: Richard Varick

Sessions
- 1st: January 9, 1788 – March 22, 1788

The 11th New York State Legislature, consisting of the New York State Senate and the New York State Assembly, met from January 9 to March 22, 1788, during the eleventh year of George Clinton's governorship, in Poughkeepsie.

== Background ==
Under the provisions of the New York Constitution of 1777, the State Senators were elected on general tickets in the senatorial districts, and were then divided into four classes. Six senators each drew lots for a term of 1, 2, 3 or 4 years and, beginning at the election in April 1778, every year six Senate seats came up for election to a four-year term. Assemblymen were elected countywide on general tickets to a one-year term, the whole assembly being renewed annually.

In March 1786, the Legislature enacted that future Legislatures meet on the first Tuesday of January of each year unless called earlier by the governor. No general meeting place was determined, leaving it to each Legislature to name the place where to reconvene, and if no place could be agreed upon, the Legislature should meet again where it adjourned.

In 1786, Columbia County was partitioned from Albany County, and 3 of Albany's Assembly seats were apportioned to Columbia.

== Elections ==
The State election was held from April 24 to 26, 1787. Senators Samuel Townsend (Southern D.) and Jacobus Swartwout (Middle D.) were re-elected; and James Duane, John Laurance (both Southern D.), Anthony Hoffman (Middle D.) and Jellis Fonda (Western D.) were also elected to the Senate.

== Sessions ==
The State Legislature was to meet on January 1, 1788, at Poughkeepsie, but the Assembly first had a quorum on January 9, the Senate on January 11; both Houses adjourned on March 22, 1788.

On February 1, 1788, the Legislature passed a resolution for the election of delegates to a Convention to deliberate upon the adoption of the U.S. Constitution. The Convention met from June 17 to July 26, 1788, at Poughkeepsie and ratified the Constitution by a vote of 30 to 27. From this time, the politicians were divided in two political parties: those who voted for the Constitution were henceforth known as Federalists, those who voted against it as Anti-Federalists, or Democratic-Republicans.

== State Senate ==
=== Districts ===
- The Southern District (9 seats) consisted of Kings, New York, Queens, Richmond, Suffolk and Westchester counties.
- The Middle District (6 seats) consisted of Dutchess, Orange and Ulster counties.
- The Eastern District (3 seats) consisted of Washington, Columbia, Cumberland and Gloucester counties.
- The Western District (6 seats) consisted of Albany and Montgomery counties.

Note: There are now 62 counties in the State of New York. The counties which are not mentioned in this list had not yet been established, or sufficiently organized, the area being included in one or more of the abovementioned counties.

=== Members ===
The asterisk (*) denotes members of the previous Legislature who continued in office as members of this Legislature.

District	Senators	Term left	Notes
Southern	William Floyd*	1 year	
Southern	Ezra L'Hommedieu*	1 year	
Southern	vacant	1 year	Alexander McDougall died on June 9, 1786. It is unclear if a special election was held, but nobody claimed the seat.
Southern	Thomas Tredwell*	2 years	
Southern	Lewis Morris*	3 years	
Southern	John Vanderbilt*	3 years	elected to the Council of Appointment
Southern	James Duane	4 years	
Southern	John Laurance	4 years	
Southern	Samuel Townsend*	4 years	
Middle	Arthur Parks*	1 year	
Middle	John Haring*	2 years	
Middle	Cornelius Humfrey*	2 years	
Middle	John Hathorn*	3 years	
Middle	Anthony Hoffman	4 years	elected to the Council of Appointment
Middle	Jacobus Swartwout*	4 years	
Eastern	Ebenezer Russell*	1 year	
Eastern	David Hopkins*	2 years	elected to the Council of Appointment
Eastern	John Williams*	3 years	
Western	Peter Van Ness*	1 year	
Western	Volkert P. Douw*	2 years	
Western	Philip Schuyler*	2 years	elected to the Council of Appointment
Western	Peter Schuyler*	3 years	
Western	Abraham Yates Jr.*	3 years	
Western	(Jellis Fonda)	4 years	did not attend

=== Employees ===
- Clerk: Abraham B. Bancker

== State Assembly ==
=== Districts ===
- The City and County of Albany (7 seats)
- Columbia County (3 seats)
- Cumberland County (3 seats)
- Dutchess County (7 seats)
- Gloucester County (2 seats)
- Kings County (2 seats)
- Montgomery County) (6 seats)
- The City and County of New York (9 seats)
- Orange County (4 seats)
- Queens County (4 seats)
- Richmond County (2 seats)
- Suffolk County (5 seats)
- Ulster County (6 seats)
- Washington County (4 seats)
- Westchester County (6 seats)

Note: There are now 62 counties in the State of New York. The counties which are not mentioned in this list had not yet been established, or sufficiently organized, the area being included in one or more of the abovementioned counties.

=== Assemblymen ===
The asterisk (*) denotes members of the previous Legislature who continued as members of this Legislature.

County	Assemblymen	Notes
Albany	Leonard Gansevoort	
Albany	James Gordon*	
Albany	Thomas Sickles*	
Albany	John De Peyster Ten Eyck	
Albany	Dirck Van Ingen	
Albany	Hezekiah Van Orden	
Albany	John Younglove	
Columbia	John Livingston*	previously a member from Albany Co.
Columbia	William Powers*	previously a member from Albany Co.
Columbia	Peter Silvester	
Cumberland	none	No election returns from these counties
Gloucester	none	No election returns from these counties
Dutchess	Egbert Benson	also New York Attorney General
Dutchess	Isaac Bloom	
Dutchess	Peter Cantine Jr.	
Dutchess	John DeWitt Jr.*	
Dutchess	Morris Graham	
Dutchess	Matthew Patterson*	
Dutchess	Thomas Tillotson	
Kings	Charles Doughty*	
Kings	Cornelius Wyckoff*	
Montgomery	Abraham Arndt	
Montgomery	John Frey*	
Montgomery	James Livingston*	
Montgomery	Isaac Paris	
Montgomery	Volkert Veeder	
Montgomery	John Winn	
New York	Evert Bancker*	
New York	Nicholas Bayard*	
New York	David Brooks*	
New York	Richard Harison	
New York	Nicholas Low	
New York	Daniel Nivin	
New York	Comfort Sands	
New York	Richard Varick	re-elected Speaker; also Recorder of New York City
New York	Gulian Verplanck	
Orange	Jeremiah Clark*	
Orange	Peter Taulman*	
Orange	William Thompson	
Orange	Henry Wisner Jr.	
Queens	Stephen Carman	
Queens	Whitehead Cornwell	
Queens	Samuel Jones*	
Queens	Francis Lewis Jr.	
Richmond	John C. Dongan*	
Richmond	Peter Winant	
Suffolk	Jonathan N. Havens*	
Suffolk	David Hedges*	
Suffolk	Daniel Osborn*	
Suffolk	John Smith*	
Suffolk	vacant	
Ulster	James Bruyn	
Ulster	John Cantine*	
Ulster	James Clinton	
Ulster	(Charles DeWitt)	died on August 27, 1787
Ulster	Cornelius C. Schoonmaker*	
Ulster	Nathan Smith*	
Washington	Albert Baker	
Washington	Edward Savage*	
Washington	Peter B. Tearse*	
Washington	Alexander Webster	
Westchester	Samuel Drake	
Westchester	Abijah Gilbert	
Westchester	Ebenezer Lockwood*	
Westchester	Joseph Strang*	
Westchester	Thomas Thomas*	
Westchester	Jonathan G. Tompkins*	

=== Employees ===
- Clerk: John McKesson

== Sources ==
- The New York Civil List compiled by Franklin Benjamin Hough (Weed, Parsons and Co., 1858) [see pg. 108 for Senate districts; pg. 113 for senators; pg. 148f for Assembly districts; pg. 164 for assemblymen; pg. 54f for U.S. Constitution ratifying convention]
