= 7th New York State Legislature =

New York state legislative session

←	6th	8th	→
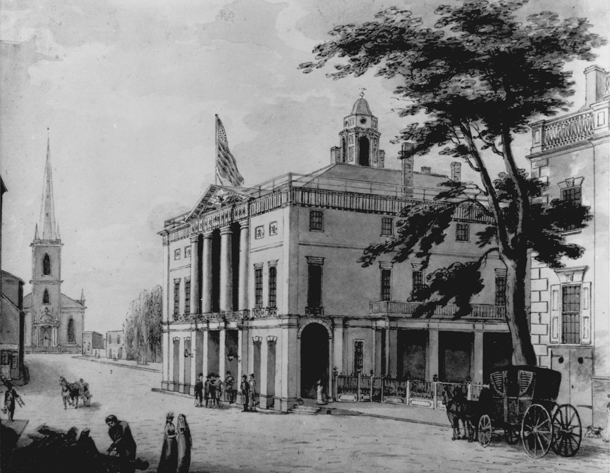
- The Old New York City Hall, where the Legislature met in 1784. It was later the venue for the 1st United States Congress and renamed Federal Hall (1798)

Overview
- Legislative body: New York State Legislature
- Jurisdiction: New York, United States
- Term: July 1, 1783 – June 30, 1784

Senate
- Members: 24
- President: Lt. Gov. Pierre Van Cortlandt

Assembly
- Members: 70 (de facto 68)
- Speaker: John Hathorn

Sessions
- 1st: January 21, 1784 – May 12, 1784

The 7th New York State Legislature, consisting of the New York State Senate and the New York State Assembly, met from January 21 to May 12, 1784, during the seventh year of George Clinton's governorship, at New York City.

== Background ==
Under the provisions of the New York Constitution of 1777, the State Senators were elected on general tickets in the senatorial districts, and were then divided into four classes. Six senators each drew lots for a term of 1, 2, 3 or 4 years and, beginning at the election in April 1778, every year six Senate seats came up for election to a four-year term. Assemblymen were elected countywide on general tickets to a one-year term, the whole assembly being renewed annually.

On May 8, 1777, the Constitutional Convention had appointed the senators from the Southern District, and the assemblymen from Kings, New York, Queens, Richmond and Suffolk counties—the area which was under British control—and determined that these appointees serve in the Legislature until elections could be held in those areas, presumably after the end of the American Revolutionary War. The war ended when the Treaty of Paris was signed on September 3, 1783. The British forces left New York City on November 25, 1783, and subsequently a special election was held to fill the seats which had been occupied by appointment.

== Elections ==
The State election was held from April 29 to May 1, 1783. Gov. George Clinton and Lt. Gov. Pierre Van Cortlandt were re-elected again. Joseph Gasherie, Jacobus Swartwout (both Middle D.) and Assemblyman Andrew Finck (Western D.) were elected to the Senate.

== Sessions ==
The State Legislature met in New York City from January 21 to May 12, 1784. On January 27, the newly elected State senators from the Southern District drew lots to define their term lengths. On April 2, the Legislature changed the name of Charlotte County to Washington County, and Tryon County to Montgomery County.

== State Senate ==
=== Districts ===
- The Southern District (9 seats) consisted of Kings, New York, Queens, Richmond, Suffolk and Westchester counties.
- The Middle District (6 seats) consisted of Dutchess, Orange and Ulster counties.
- The Eastern District (3 seats) consisted of Charlotte (renamed Washington), Cumberland and Gloucester counties.
- The Western District (6 seats) consisted of Albany and Tryon (renamed Montgomery counties.

Note: There are now 62 counties in the State of New York. The counties which are not mentioned in this list had not yet been established, or sufficiently organized, the area being included in one or more of the abovementioned counties.

=== Members ===
The asterisk (*) denotes members of the previous Legislature who continued in office as members of this Legislature. Ezra L'Hommedieu, Jacobus Swartwout and Andrew Finck changed from the Assembly to the Senate.

District	Senators	Term left	Notes
Southern	William Floyd*	1 year	
Southern	Ezra L'Hommedieu*	1 year	elected to the Council of Appointment
Southern	Alexander McDougall	1 year	
Southern	James Duane*	2 years	from February 1784 also Mayor of New York City
Southern	Lewis Morris*	3 years	
Southern	Isaac Roosevelt*	3 years	
Southern	Isaac Stoutenburgh*	4 years	
Southern	Samuel Townsend	4 years	
Southern	Stephen Ward*	4 years	
Middle	Arthur Parks*	1 year	
Middle	John Haring*	2 years	
Middle	Ephraim Paine*	2 years	
Middle	William Allison*	3 years	
Middle	Joseph Gasherie	4 years	
Middle	Jacobus Swartwout*	4 years	elected to the Council of Appointment
Eastern	(Elkanah Day)*	1 year	did not attend
Eastern	Alexander Webster*	2 years	elected to the Council of Appointment
Eastern	John Williams*	3 years	
Western	Philip Schuyler*	1 year	also New York State Surveyor General
Western	Henry Oothoudt*	2 years	
Western	William B. Whiting*	2 years	
Western	Jacob G. Klock*	3 years	
Western	Abraham Yates Jr.*	3 years	elected to the Council of Appointment
Western	Andrew Finck*	4 years	

=== Employees ===
- Clerk: Robert Benson until February 18, 1784
  - Abraham B. Bancker

== State Assembly ==
=== Districts ===
- The City and County of Albany (10 seats)
- Charlotte County (renamed Washington County (4 seats)
- Cumberland County (3 seats)
- Dutchess County (7 seats)
- Gloucester County (2 seats)
- Kings County (2 seats)
- The City and County of New York (9 seats)
- Orange County (4 seats)
- Queens County (4 seats)
- Richmond County (2 seats)
- Suffolk County (5 seats)
- Tryon County (renamed Montgomery County) (6 seats)
- Ulster County (6 seats)
- Westchester County (6 seats)

Note: There are now 62 counties in the State of New York. The counties which are not mentioned in this list had not yet been established, or sufficiently organized, the area being included in one or more of the abovementioned counties.

=== Assemblymen ===
The asterisk (*) denotes members of the previous Legislature who continued as members of this Legislature.

County	Assemblymen	Notes
Albany	Matthew Adgate*	
Albany	Abraham Becker	
Albany	Abraham Cuyler	
Albany	Jacob Ford*	
Albany	James Gordon	
Albany	John Lansing Jr.*	
Albany	Peter Schuyler	
Albany	Dirck Swart*	
Albany	Peter Van Ness*	
Albany	Christopher Yates*	
Charlotte (renamed Washington)	David Hopkins*	
Charlotte (renamed Washington)	Hamilton McCollister*	
Charlotte (renamed Washington)	Ebenezer Russell	
Charlotte (renamed Washington)	Edward Savage	
Cumberland	Joel Bigelow	
Cumberland	Elijah Prouty	
Cumberland	William Shattuck	
Dutchess	Dirck Brinckerhoff	
Dutchess	Thomas Dennis	
Dutchess	Anthony Hoffman	
Dutchess	Cornelius Humfrey*	
Dutchess	Ebenezer Husted*	
Dutchess	Matthew Patterson*	
Dutchess	Thomas Storm*	
Gloucester	none	No election returns from this county
Kings	Johannes E. Lott	
Kings	Rutger Van Brunt	
New York	Robert Harpur*	
New York	Henry Hughes	
New York	John Lamb	vacated his seat on March 22, 1784, upon appointment as Collector of the Port of New York
New York	William Malcom*	previously member from Ulster County
New York	Henry Rutgers	
New York	Isaac Sears	
New York	John Stagg*	previously member from Orange Co.
New York	Peter P. Van Zandt*	
New York	Marinus Willett	seat declared vacant on February 10, 1784, upon appointment as Sheriff of New York County
Orange	Jeremiah Clark*	
Orange	Gilbert Cooper*	
Orange	John Hathorn*	elected Speaker
Orange	William Sickles	
Queens	Benjamin Coe*	
Queens	Hendrick Onderdonck	
Queens	Samuel Riker	
Queens	James Townsend	
Richmond	Adrian Bancker	
Richmond	Johannes Van Wagenen	
Suffolk	John Brush	
Suffolk	David Gelston*	
Suffolk	Ebenezer Platt	
Suffolk	Jeffrey Smith	
Suffolk	Thomas Youngs	
Tryon (renamed Montgomery)	Abraham Copeman	
Tryon (renamed Montgomery)	William Harper	
Tryon (renamed Montgomery)	James Livingston	
Tryon (renamed Montgomery)	Isaac Paris	
Tryon (renamed Montgomery)	Volkert Veeder	
Tryon (renamed Montgomery)	Christopher P. Yates	
Ulster	John Cantine	
Ulster	Charles DeWitt*	
Ulster	James Hunter*	
Ulster	John Nicholson*	
Ulster	Cornelius C. Schoonmaker*	
Ulster	Nathan Smith	
Westchester	Abijah Gilbert*	
Westchester	Samuel Haight*	
Westchester	Zebediah Mills*	
Westchester	Philip Pell	
Westchester	Ebenezer Purdy*	
Westchester	Thomas Thomas*	

=== Employees ===
- Clerk: John McKesson

== Sources ==
- The New York Civil List compiled by Franklin Benjamin Hough (Weed, Parsons and Co., 1858) [see pg. 108 for Senate districts; pg. 112 for senators; pg. 148f for Assembly districts; pg. 161f for assemblymen]
