= Pell =

Pell is both a given name and a surname shared by several notable people, listed below :

== Given name ==
- Pell Cooper (born 1959), American lawyer and judge

== Surname ==
- Albert Pell (1820–1907), British politician
- Axel Rudi Pell (born 1960), German heavy metal guitarist, Steeler and Pell
- Barney Pell (born 1968), American computer scientist
- Benjamin Pell, British computer security expert
- Charles Pell (1874–1936), American football coach
- Charley Pell (1941–2001), American football player and coach
- Claiborne Pell (1918–2009), American politician from Rhode Island
- Clay Pell (born 1981), American lawyer
- Dave Pell (1925–2017), American jazz saxophonist and bandleader
- Ella Ferris Pell (1846–1922), American painter, sculptor, and illustrator
- Eva J. Pell (born 1948), American biologist, plant pathologist, and science administrator
- George Pell (1941–2023), Australian Catholic cardinal
- Harry Pell (born 1991), English footballer
- Herbert Pell (1884–1961), American diplomat
- Isabel Pell (1900–1951), American socialite and member of the French Resistance
- John Pell (mathematician) (1611–1685), English mathematician, Pell's equation
- Sir John Pell (landowner), his son, British-born American landowner
- John H. Pell, American politician from Minnesota
- Morris Birkbeck Pell (1827–1879), American-Australian mathematician, lawyer and actuary
- Olive Pell (1903–2002), Australian poet and librarian
- Paula Pell (born 1963), American writer, actress, comedian and producer
- Philip Pell (1753–1811), American politician and lawyer from New York
- Robert Pell (footballer) (born 1979), English footballer
- Robert Livingston Pell (1818–1880), American landowner
- Thomas Pell (1608–1669), English-born physician who emigrated to United States
- William Pell (tenor) (1947–2003), American opera singer
- William Pell (footballer) (1883-1915), English footballer
- William Pell (minister) (1634–1698), English minister

== See also ==
- Pelle (surname)
