= Pelle =

Pelle may refer to:

- Pelle (album), a 2000 studio album of the Italian band Punkreas
- Pelle (given name)
- Pelle (surname)
- Pelle Pelle, a fashion brand
  - "Pelle Coat", a 2023 song by Lil Durk named after the brand
- An enzyme, also known as IRAK1
- A familiar form of the male given name Per
- Another name of Pella (Thessaly), an ancient town
- Dead (musician) (1969-1991), nicknamed Pelle, Swedish musician

== See also ==
- Pell (disambiguation)
