= William Pell =

William Pell may refer to:

- William Pell (tenor), American opera singer
- William Pell (minister), English nonconformist minister
- William Pell (footballer), English footballer
- William Ferris Pell, American horticulturist
