= Cumberland County, Vermont =

Former county in the US state of Vermont

Coordinates: 43°50′N 72°20′W

Cumberland County
- County of Vermont Republic
- 1778–1781
- History
  - Establishment: 17 March 1778
  - Partition into smaller counties: 1781
- Contained within
  - Country: Vermont Republic
Preceded by
| Cumberland County |
| Gloucester County |
Succeeded by
| Orange County |
| Windham County |
| Windsor County |
- Today part of: United States

The Cumberland County, until 21 March 1778 known as the Unity County, was a county in the Vermont Republic. It was established on 17 March 1778, being formed from the counties of Cumberland and Gloucester from the state of New York, United States, that were acquired by Vermont. It existed until 1781, when it got partitioned into three other counties: Orange, Windham, and Windsor.

== See also ==
- List of counties in Vermont
- List of counties in New York
- List of former United States counties
