= Pell (disambiguation) =

Pell is a surname.

Pell may also refer to:

- Pell (musician) (born 1992), American rapper
- Pell (One Piece), a minor character in the Japanese anime One Piece
- Pell Airfield, Northern Territory, Australia
- Pell Grant, an American federal education grant program
- Pell Inlet, a waterway in Nunavut, Canada
- Pell Office, a historic department of the British government
- Pell's equation, a mathematical equation
- Pell's World and Pell Station, a fictional planet and orbital station in C. J. Cherryh's Alliance–Union universe
- Pellville, Kentucky, an unincorporated community in Hancock County

== See also ==
- Pelle (disambiguation)
