= James Townsend (New York politician) =

American politician

Member-elect of the U.S. House of Representatives from New York's 1st district
- Died before taking office
- Preceded by: William Floyd
- Succeeded by: Thomas Tredwell

Personal details
- Born: December 17, 1729
- Died: May 24, 1790 (aged 60)
- Party: Federalist

James Townsend (December 17, 1729 – May 24, 1790 in Jericho, then in Queens, now in Nassau County, New York) was an American politician from New York.

== Life ==
Townsend was the son of Jacob Townsend (1692–1742) and Phebe (Seaman) Townsend (1699–1774). On April 2, 1757, he married Mary Hicks (1730–1796); they had seven children.

Townsend was a deputy to the 3rd and 4th New York Provincial Congresses in 1776. He was a member of the New York State Assembly in 1784, 1784-85, 1786, and 1787. He was elected as a Federalist to the 2nd United States Congress in April 1790, but died a month later, before his term began.

== See also ==
- List of United States representatives-elect who never took their seats

== Sources ==
- The New York Civil List compiled by Franklin Benjamin Hough (pages 53, 92, 161ff and 310; Weed, Parsons and Co., 1858)
- Congressional election result and death notice in Queens County in Olden Times by Henry Onderdonk Jr. (1865; page 74)
- Transcript from James Townsend's family bible at

U.S. House of Representatives
Preceded by William Floyd	Member-elect of the U.S. House of Representatives from New York's 1st congressional district 1790	Succeeded by Thomas Tredwell
