= Thomas Treadwell Davis =

American politician (1810–1872)

Thomas T. Davis
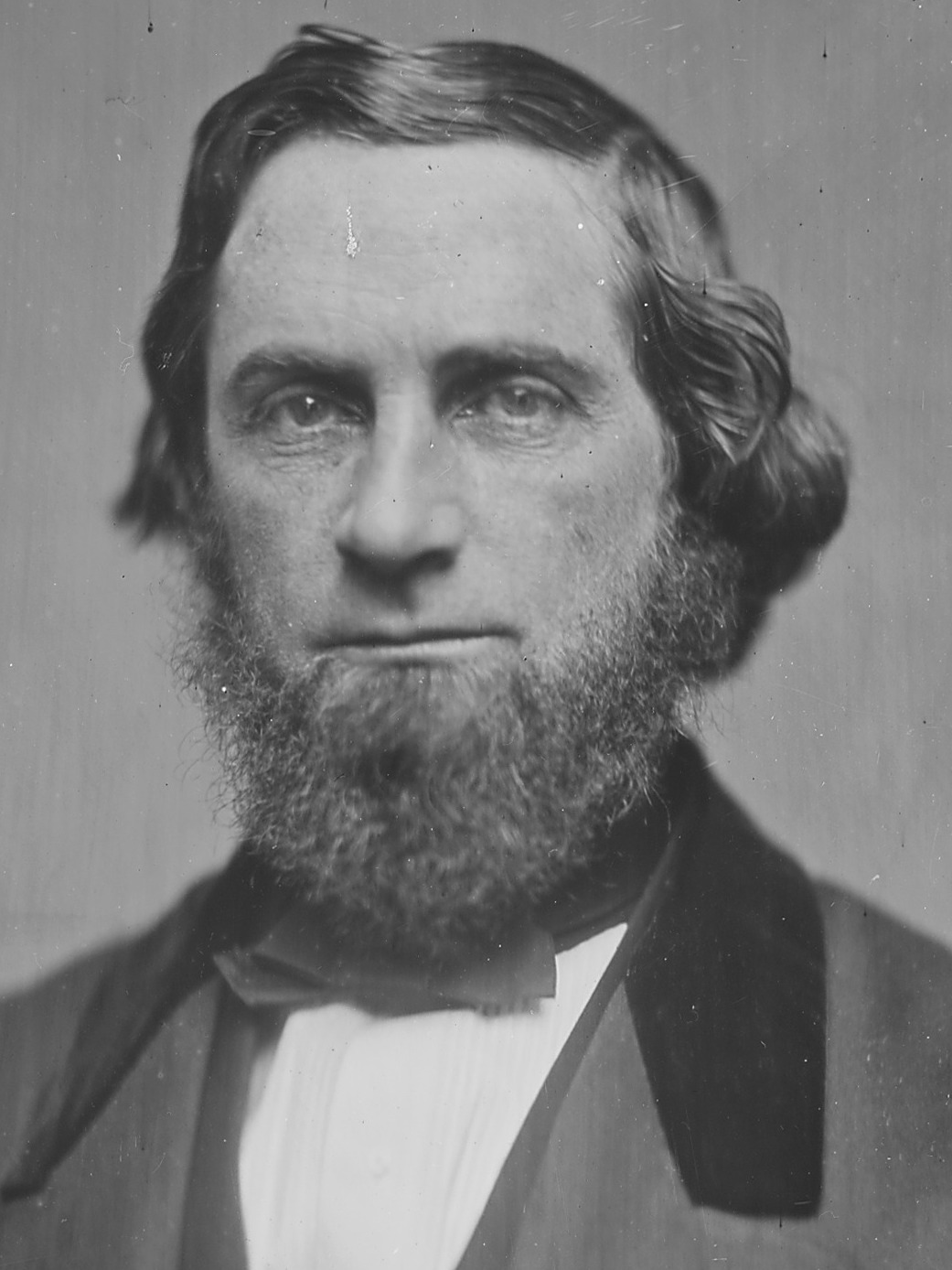

Member of the U.S. House of Representatives from New York's 23rd district
- In office March 4, 1863 – March 3, 1867
- Preceded by: Ambrose W. Clark
- Succeeded by: Dennis McCarthy

Personal details
- Born: Thomas Treadwell Davis; August 22, 1810 Middlebury, Vermont, US
- Died: May 2, 1872 (aged 61) Washington, D.C., US
- Resting place: Oakwood Cemetery; Syracuse, New York
- Party: Unionist
- Other political affiliations: Republican
- Relations: Thomas Tredwell
- Education: Hamilton College
- Occupation: Lawyer, Politician

Thomas Treadwell Davis (August 22, 1810 – May 2, 1872) was a lawyer and politician in the U.S. state of New York. He served as a United States representative from New York during the latter half of the American Civil War and the subsequent beginning of Reconstruction.

== Early life and education ==
Davis was born in Middlebury, Vermont, and moved to New York in 1817 with his parents who eventually settled in Clinton. He attended Clinton Academy and graduated from Hamilton College in 1831. Davis then moved to Syracuse, studied law, and was admitted to the bar. He began the practice of law in Syracuse.

== Political career ==
He held many political positions in New York and was elected as a Unionist candidate to the 38th Congress. Davis was re-elected as a Republican to the 39th Congress, serving from March 4, 1863, to March 3, 1867. He was not a candidate for renomination in 1866 and after leaving Congress he resumed the practice of law in Syracuse.

Davis died in Washington, D.C., on May 2, 1872. His remains were cremated and the ashes deposited in Oakwood Cemetery in Syracuse.

== Family life ==
His grandfather Thomas Tredwell represented New York in the United States House of Representatives from 1791 to 1795.

U.S. House of Representatives
Preceded by Ambrose W. Clark	Member of the U.S. House of Representatives from New York's 23rd congressional district 1863–1867	Succeeded by Dennis McCarthy
