= James Livingston (American Revolution) =

Commander of the 1st Canadian Regiment of the Continental Army

Member of the New York State Assembly from Montgomery Co.
- In office July 1, 1789 – June 30, 1791
- In office July 1, 1783 – June 30, 1788

Personal details
- Born: March 25, 1747 Albany, Province of New York, British America
- Died: March 9, 1832 (aged 84) Saratoga, New York, U.S.
- Party: Federalist
- Spouse: Elizabeth Simpson (m. 1772; died 1800)
- Relations: Livingston family
- Parent(s): John Livingston; Catherine Ten Broeck

Military service
- Allegiance: United States of America
- Branch/service: Continental Army
- Years of service: 1775–1781
- Rank: Colonel
- Unit: 1st Canadian Regiment
- Commands: 1st Canadian Regiment
- Battles/wars: American Revolutionary War; Siege of Fort St. Jean; Battle of Quebec; Battle of Trois-Rivières; Battles of Saratoga; Battle of Rhode Island

James Livingston (March 27, 1747 – March 9, 1832), born in New York, was an American Patriot. Livingston was living in the Province of Quebec (as it was known following the French and Indian War) when the American Revolutionary War broke out. He was responsible for raising and leading the 1st Canadian Regiment of the Patriots' Continental Army during the invasion of northeastern Canada, and continued to serve in the war until 1781. He retired to Saratoga, New York, where he served as a state legislator and raised a family of five children.

== Early life ==
James Livingston was born March 27, 1747, in Albany, New York, to Johanes "John" Livingston (1709–1791) and Catherine Ten Broeck (1715–1801). His siblings included Margerita Livingston (1742–1820), Dirck Livingston (1744–1784), Janet Livingston (1751–1823), Abraham Livingston (1753–1802), Catherine (née Livingston) Willard (1755–1827), and Maria Livingston (1761–1839).

His paternal grandfather was Robert Livingston the Younger (1663–1725), a nephew of Robert Livingston the Elder. His paternal grandmother, Margareta Schuyler (b. 1682), was the daughter of Pieter Schuyler (1657–1724), the first Mayor of Albany. They were all members of the prominent Livingston family. His maternal grandparents were Dirck Ten Broeck (1686–1751) and Margarita Cuyler (1682–1783). His mother, the great-granddaughter of Dirck Wesselse Ten Broeck (1638–1717), was the sister of General Abraham Ten Broeck (1734–1810), who married Elizabeth Van Rensselaer, and Christina Ten Broeck (1718–1801), who married Philip Livingston (1716–1778), and Sara Ten Broeck, who married Johannes Ten Eyck. Among his many cousins was Dirck Ten Broeck (1765–1832), the Speaker of the New York State Assembly from 1798 to 1800.

By 1765, the family had moved to Montreal.

== American Revolutionary War ==
Livingston was living in Chambly, working as a grain merchant, when the invasion of northeastern Quebec began in September 1775. As early as August, he had been in contact with General Philip Schuyler, mostly through the efforts of John Brown, an American spy. On August 18, he sent a messenger to Schuyler at Fort Ticonderoga, presumably with information on British military readiness at Fort Chambly and Fort Saint-Jean; however, this messenger destroyed the message, fearing he might be captured with it. General Richard Montgomery (who was married to one of Livingston's relatives), who was in command of Ticonderoga at the time, sent John Brown back to Livingston. On the 28th, they sent word back to Montgomery with news that spurred him to begin the invasion: the British had almost completed ships capable of threatening the American naval superiority on Lake Champlain.

Up to, and then also following, the arrival of the American forces at Île aux Noix in early September, Livingston was active in the Chambly area, raising local support for the Americans. On September 15, he reported to Schuyler that militia under his control had cut off Fort Chambly from communication with Montreal, and that Brown and Ethan Allen were raising additional troops and guarding the southern shore of the Saint Lawrence River.

Forces under his command, numbering about 200, participated in the capture of Fort Chambly on October 18, along with militia under Brown's command. On November 20, Montgomery made him a colonel in the Continental Army, and gave him command of the 1st Canadian Regiment, consisting mainly of the troops he had recruited. This regiment then served at the battle of Quebec in December 1775, and the ensuing retreat. They later saw action in the Saratoga campaign, including the relief of the siege of Fort Stanwix in August 1777, both Battles of Saratoga, and the Battle of Rhode Island.

Livingston was in command of Verplanck's Point on the Hudson River in September 1780, when he played a crucial role in the unmasking of Benedict Arnold's treachery. While on guard duty, his troops fired on the British sloop of war Vulture, forcing that vessel to retreat southwards. This ship had brought British Major John André to meet with General Arnold. After being driven off in his approach by water, he attempted to re-approach on land by portaging in civilian clothing. He was captured with incriminating papers in his possession. André was hanged as a spy, and Arnold, knowing that his plot had been discovered, managed to escape to the British lines.

Livingston retired from the Continental Army on January 1, 1781. In recognition of his service, he was granted 3,500 acres (14 km^{2}) of land near where Tyre, New York is today. In 1801, Congress awarded him another 1,280 acres (5.2 km^{2}) of land near the modern location of Columbus, Ohio.

=== Post-war ===
After the war, Livingston settled in Saratoga. From July 1, 1783 until June 30, 1788, he served in the New York State Assembly beginning with the 7th Legislature and continuing through the 8th, 9th, 10th, and finally, the 11th New York State Legislature as a Federalist. He served again from July 1, 1789 until June 30, 1791 during the 13th and 14th Legislatures.

Livingston served as a member of the first Board of Regents of the University of New York from April 13, 1787 until his resignation in 1797. He was replaced by Abraham Van Vechten.

== Death ==
Livingston died in Saratoga, New York, in 1832, at age 85.

== Personal life ==
In 1772, Livingston had married Elizabeth Simpson (1750–1800), an immigrant from Cork, Ireland living in Montreal. Together, they had at least two sons and three daughters, including:

- Elizabeth Livingston (1773–1818), who married Peter Gerrit Smith (1768–1837), a business partner of John Jacob Astor. Gerrit Smith was their son.
- James Livingston (1775–1851), who married Patty Martha Griffith
- Richard Montgomery Livingston (1787–1838), who was named after the general in his memory and who married Sarah Livingston (1792–1873).
- Edward Chinn Livingston (1783–1843), early settler of Columbus, Ohio, who married Martha Nelson (1785–1855)
- Margaret Livingston (1785–1871), who married Daniel Cady (1773–1859).
- Catharine Ten Broeck Livingston (1789–1874), who married Henry Brevoort Henry (1786–1818).

=== Descendants ===
He was the grandfather, through his eldest daughter Elizabeth, of famed abolitionist Gerrit Smith (1797–1874), who married Ann Carroll Fitzhugh. Smith was a candidate for President of the United States in 1848, 1856, and 1860.

He was also the grandfather, through his daughter Margaret of:

- Tryphenia Cady (1804–1891), who married Edward Bayard (1806–1889), a Union College classmate of Eleazar and son of James Bayard, a U.S. Senator.
- Eleazer Livingston Cady (1806–1826), who died at age 20 just before his graduation from Union College.
- Harriet Elizabeth Cady (1810–1894), who married Daniel Cady Eaton (1804–1855), son of Amos Eaton and brother of General Amos Beebe Eaton, and her first cousin.
- Elizabeth Smith Cady (1815–1902), the prominent suffragist who married Henry Brewster Stanton, brother of Robert L. Stanton, in 1840.
- Margaret Chinn Cady (1817–1901), who married Duncan McMartin (1817–1894), son of Duncan McMartin Jr., a New York State Senator.
- Catherine Henry Cady (1820–1899), who married Samuel Wilkeson (1817–1889), son of Samuel Wilkeson, a Mayor of Buffalo.
