= William Goforth (doctor) =

American politician and physician

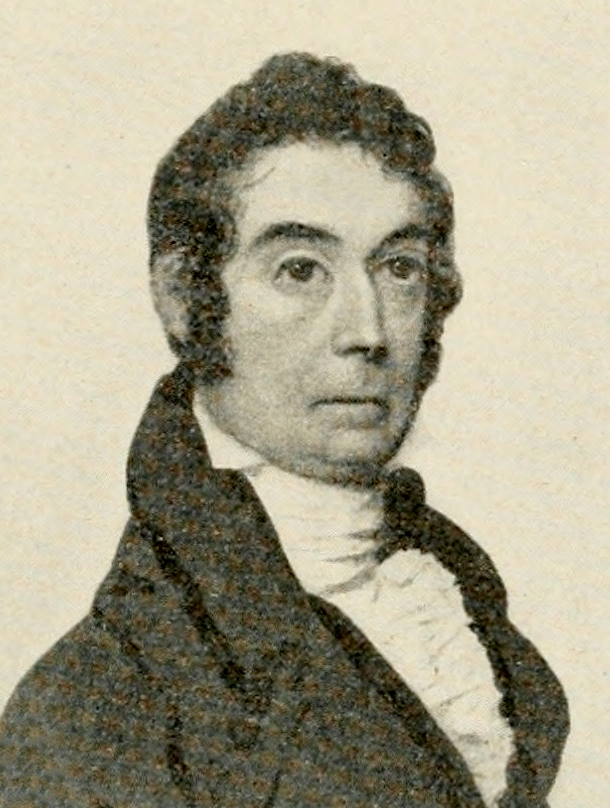

Ohio Presidential elector for Thomas Jefferson
- In office 1804–1804 Serving with Nathaniel Massie; James Pritchard
- Preceded by: none (new state)
- Succeeded by: Nathaniel Massie; Thomas McCune; Stephen Wood

Personal details
- Born: December 26, 1766 New York City
- Died: May 12, 1817 (aged 50) Cincinnati, Ohio
- Resting place: Spring Grove Cemetery
- Party: Democratic-Republican

Military service
- Rank: surgeon
- Battles/wars: War of 1812

William Goforth (December 26, 1766 - May 12, 1817) was an American politician and physician in Ohio and Louisiana. He administered the first smallpox vaccines and conferred the first medical degree in the frontier west, and was a delegate to write the first constitution of Louisiana. He also excavated a large number of megafauna bones at Big Bone Lick in Kentucky.

== Youth ==
William Goforth was born in New York City on December 26, 1766. His father was William Goforth, later an American Revolutionary War soldier, member of the New York State Legislature and one of the earliest immigrants to Cincinnati, where he was active in politics. The younger Goforth had a preparatory education, and studied medicine in the city under Joseph Young and Charles McKnight. A mob opposed to studies of anatomy attacked the class during the winter of 1787 - 1788.

== Frontier life ==
Goforth decided to leave the city, moved west with his brother-in-law, John S. Gano, and arrived at Limestone, now Maysville, Kentucky, on June 10, 1788. He moved on to Washington, Kentucky, near the Ohio River, and had a large medical practice there for eleven years. Here he married the daughter of Rev. William Wood, a Baptist pastor.

In 1799, Goforth moved to Columbia, Northwest Territory, where his father was one of the earliest settlers of the territory. The next year he settled in Cincinnati. He was the first doctor in the frontier west to acquire and administer the smallpox vaccine in 1801.

Goforth had "the most remarkable and diversified mass" of fossil bones of megafauna dug up, at great expense, in 1803 from the Big Bone Lick in Kentucky; he entrusted these to an Englishman named Thomas Ashe, who sold them in Europe, and absconded with the money. He also was active in the trade of locally harvested Ginseng that was shipped to China. In 1804, either he or his father was a Presidential elector, voting for Thomas Jefferson and George Clinton.

In late 1800, Goforth took on Daniel Drake as a medical student, having previously trained his brother John Drake in Kentucky. Goforth presented Daniel Drake a diploma in August 1805, which he signed as "Surgeon-General of the First Division of the Ohio Militia". This was the first diploma issued to a student of medicine west of the Alleghanies. In 1807, Goforth asked Drake to take over his medical practice, as he wished to move on to Louisiana. "In the medical history of the west one gigantic figure towers above all others. For nearly half a century, Daniel Drake was the dominant factor in educational development of every kind, medical, scientific, and literary."

== Life in Louisiana ==
In 1807, Goforth rode a flatboat down the Ohio River and Mississippi River to Louisiana. There he became a Parish judge. In 1812, he was elected a delegate from Iberville Parish to the convention to write the constitution for the state. He removed to New Orleans, where he was a surgeon for a regiment of volunteers during invasion of the city by the British during the War of 1812. He decided to return to Cincinnati in 1816, and reached the city on December 28, 1816. He died May 12, 1817, in Cincinnati from hepatitis he had contracted on his river voyage the previous year. He was buried in Columbia, and reinterred in 1854 at Spring Grove Cemetery.

He had the most winning manners of any physician that I ever knew

— Daniel Drake

== See also ==
- Washington Historic District, which includes the William Goforth House
