= Isaac Stoutenburgh =

American politician

Isaac Stoutenburgh (March 12, 1739 – October 12, 1799) was an American politician from New York.

== Early life ==
He was born on March 12, 1738/9, the son of Isaac Stoutenburgh (1705–1770) and Anneke (née Dally) Stoutenburgh (1710–1795). His sister, Neeltje Stoutenburgh, married William Heyer and was the mother of Cornelius Heyer.

== Career ==
He fought in the American Revolutionary War, and became a colonel of the State Militia.

Stoutenburgh was a member of the 2nd, 3rd and 4th New York Provincial Congresses from 1775 to 1777. He was a member of the New York State Senate (Southern D.) from 1778 to 1787, sitting in the 2nd, 3rd, 4th, 5th, 6th, 7th, 8th, 9th and 10th New York State Legislatures. He was a member of the Council of Appointment in 1781–82. In February 1780, he was appointed as a Commissioner of Forfeitures for the Southern District, in charge of the confiscation and sale of Loyalists' properties.

On March 26, 1796, he was appointed as one of the Commissioners to build the first state prison in New York, the Newgate Prison in New York City, which was inaugurated in 1797. The commission was succeeded on February 15, 1799, by a Prison Inspector.

== Personal life ==
Stoutenburgh died on October 12, 1799.
