= William Goforth =

American politician

New York County member of the New York State Assembly
- In office 1784–1786

Personal details
- Born: April 1, 1731 Philadelphia, Pennsylvania
- Died: November 2, 1807 (aged 76) Columbia, Ohio
- Resting place: Spring Grove Cemetery
- Party: Democratic-Republican
- Spouse: Catharine Meeks
- Children: William Goforth

Military service
- Years of service: June 28, 1775 - July 6, 1776
- Rank: Major
- Unit: New York Line
- Battles/wars: Invasion of Canada; Battle of Three Rivers

William Goforth (1731–1807), also called Judge William Goforth and Major William Goforth, was a member of the Committee of One Hundred and Committee of Safety in New York City, an officer of the New York Line during the American Revolutionary War, and was a member of the New York State Assembly after the war. He was one of the earliest migrants to the Cincinnati area, where he was named a judge and was elected to the territorial legislature.

== Life in East ==
William Goforth was born in Philadelphia, Pennsylvania, on April 1, 1731. He married Catharine Meeks in New York City on May 18, 1760. He was a member of the Committee of Safety and Committee of One Hundred early in the American Revolutionary War. He joined the 1st Regiment New York Line as a Captain on June 28, 1775, under Colonel Alexander McDougall, was a Major, 5th Regiment New York Line, June 26, 1776, and resigned July 6, 1776. He served in the Invasion of Canada and the Battle of Three Rivers.

Goforth was elected to the New York State Assembly for the 8th and 9th New York State Legislature, serving from 1784 to 1786.

== Life in West ==
Goforth was among the earliest settlers in Southwest Ohio, when he settled at Columbia, now a neighborhood of Cincinnati, in the Northwest Territory in early 1789. On January 4, 1790, Governor Arthur St. Clair established Hamilton County and named Goforth one of three Judges of the Court of Common Pleas and Justices of the Court of General Quarter Sessions of the Peace.

Like other Democratic-Republicans in Ohio, statehood became important to William Goforth. To that end, he along with Thomas Goudy, David Zeigler, Robert McClure, Aaron Caldwell, William McMillan and Robert Benham formed a Committee of Correspondence in 1797 to share this desire with other counties in the Northwest Territory.

He was elected one of the Hamilton County representatives in the Northwest Territory House of Representatives for the First Territorial Legislature, which met from September 16 to December 19, 1799, at Cincinnati, and from November 3 to December 9, 1800, at Chillicothe.

On March 3, 1801, the Congress passed 2 Stat. 112, titled "An Act giving a right of pre-emption to certain persons who have contracted with John Cleves Symmes, or his associates, for lands lying between the Miami rivers, in the territory of the United States northwest of the Ohio" Section 4 of this act called for the President to appoint two commissioners to "ascertain the rights of persons claiming the benefits of this act. Goforth and John Reily were named by the President to be these commissioners.

In 1802, Goforth ran as a Democratic-Republican to be a delegate to the convention that would draft a constitution for the proposed state of Ohio. He was elected to the convention, which met from November 1 to November 29, 1802. He voted against ever allowing slavery in the state, and was in the minority in voting for suffrage and other civil rights for black people.

After Ohio became a state, an election was held for Ohio's at-large congressional district in 1803. Goforth finished in fifth place. Either Goforth, or his son, also William was a Presidential elector in 1804, voting for Thomas Jefferson.

Goforth died November 2, 1807 at Columbia.
