= Pelle (surname) =

Pelle or Pellè is a surname. Notable people with the surname include:

- Anikó Pelle (born 1978), Hungarian water polo player
- Anthony Pelle (born 1972), American basketball player
- Antonio Pelle (1932–2009), Italian mafioso
- Giuseppe Pelle (born 1960), Italian mafioso, son of Antonio
- Graziano Pellè (born 1985), Italian football player
- István Pelle (1907–1986), Hungarian gymnast
- Jon Pelle (born 1986), American ice hockey player
- Maurice Pellé (1863–1924), French general
- Nathan Pelle, American actor
- Salvatore Pelle (born 1957), Italian mafioso, son of Antonio
- Sebastiano Pelle (born 1954), Italian mafioso, nephew of Antonio

== See also ==
- Pele (name), given name and surname
- Pell, surname
