= Ebenezer Russell =

American politician

Member of the New York State Assembly for Washington Co.
- In office July 1, 1812 – June 30, 1813
- In office July 1, 1783 – June 30, 1784

Member of the New York State Senate for the Eastern District
- In office July 1, 1795 – June 30, 1803
- Preceded by: William Powers
- In office July 1, 1784 – June 30, 1788
- Preceded by: Elkanah Day
- Succeeded by: vacant
- In office July 1, 1778 – June 30, 1782
- Preceded by: William Duer
- Succeeded by: John Williams

Member of the New York State Assembly for Charlotte Co.
- In office September 9, 1777 – June 30, 1778

Personal details
- Born: December 26, 1747 Branford, Connecticut
- Died: December 5, 1836 (aged 88) Salem, New York, U.S.
- Party: Federalist
- Spouse: Elizabeth Stork (m. 1769; died 1832)
- Children: William Russell; John Russell

Ebenezer Russell (December 26, 1747 – December 5, 1836) was an American politician from New York.

== Early life ==
He was born on December 26, 1747, in Branford, New Haven County, Connecticut. He was the son of Mary (née Barker) Russell (b. 1710) and John Russell (1710–1751).

== Career ==
He fought as a private in the American Revolutionary War. He was County Treasurer, first of Charlotte County, then of Washington County, for about forty years.

Russell was a member of the New York State Assembly (Charlotte Co.) in 1777–78; and a member of the New York State Senate (Eastern D.) from 1778 to 1782, sitting in the 2nd, 3rd, 4th and 5th New York State Legislatures. He was a member of the Council of Appointment in 1778–79 and 1780–81.

He was again a member of the State Assembly in 1784. During this term, the Legislature changed the name of Charlotte County to Washington County. He was again a member of the State Senate from 1784 to 1788, sitting in the 8th, 9th, 10th and 11th New York State Legislatures. He was again a member of the Council of Appointment in 1784–85 and 1787. On November 12, 1784, he was appointed, and on April 13, 1787, re-appointed as a Regent of the University of the State of New York.

He was First Judge of the Washington County Court from 1788 to 1800. In December 1794, he ran on the Federalist ticket for Congress in the Saratoga–Washington district, but was defeated by Democratic-Republican John Williams.

When the first political parties were formed, Russell joined the Federalist Party. He was again a member of the State Senate from 1796 to 1803, sitting in the 19th, 20th, 21st, 22nd, 23rd, 24th, 25th and 26th New York State Legislatures; and was again a member of the Council of Appointment in 1796.

He was again a member of the State Assembly in 1812–13. In 1813, he resigned from the Board of Regents of USNY.

== Personal life ==
On September 13, 1769, he married Elizabeth Stork (1747–1832), the daughter of Capt. Moses Stork. Together, they had several children, including:

- William Russell (1771–1853), who married Submit Foskitt Willson (1767–1849).
- John Russell (1772–1842), who studied medicine before becoming a member of the U.S. House of Representatives. He was married to Elizabeth Williams (1769–1838), daughter of Rensselaer Williams.

He died on December 5, 1836, in Salem, New York; and was buried at the Revolutionary Cemetery there.

=== Descendants ===
Through his son John, he was the grandfather of Catharine Ann Russell (1805–1875) who married Samuel Nelson (1792–1873), an Associate Justice of the Supreme Court of the United States. They were the parents of four children, including Judge Rensselaer Russell Nelson (1826–1904).
