= Nathan Pelle =

American actor

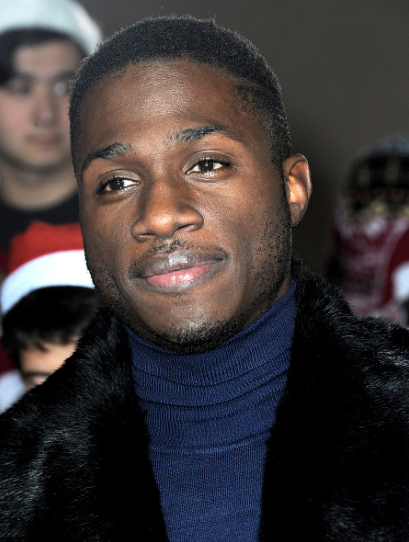
- Nathan Pelle in December 2015
- Born: Nathan Pelle; Bronx, New York, U.S.
- Occupation: Actor • producer • entrepreneur • author • venture capitalist
- Years active: 2010–present
- Website: www.nathanpelle.com

Nathan Pelle is an American actor, producer, author and entrepreneur. He is known for his roles as Reginald Williams on the TV Series Worldstar Headquarters, Martin in the 2012 film Two Jacks, Thomas Knight in the 2015 series CSI: Cyber and Homeless Skip in the 2022 series Send Help .

== Career ==
Pelle is known for his roles as Reginald Williams on the TV Series Worldstar Headquarters, Martin in the 2012 film Two Jacks, Thomas Knight in the 2015 series CSI: Cyber and Funny Man, Skip in the 2022 series Send Help.

Beyond entertainment, Pelle is also a serial investor who has successfully invested in several high technology startups and real-estate projects. In 2018 Pelle released his 1st book “On a Positive Note” A help book on living a positive lifestyle.

== Filmography ==
=== Television ===
Year	Title	Role	Notes
2015	CSI: Cyber	Thomas Knight	Episode: “Hack E.R."
2015–2016	Worldstar Headquarters	Reginald	10 episodes
2022	Send Help	Skip	Episode:

=== Film ===
Year	Title	Role	Director	Notes
2010	Our Family Wedding	Raymond Boyd	Rick Famuyiwa	
2012	Two Jacks	Martin	Bernard Rose	
