= William Pell (footballer) =

English footballer

Personal information
- Full name: William Henry Pell
- Date of birth: 1883
- Place of birth: Pattishall, England
- Date of death: 9 May 1915 (aged 32)
- Place of death: Pas-de-Calais, France
- Position: Right half

Senior career*
Years	Team	Apps	(Gls)
- Kettering
- Northampton Town
1902–1903	Glossop	62	(0)
- * Club domestic league appearances and goals

William Henry Pell (1883 – 9 May 1915) was an English professional footballer who played as a right half in the Football League for Glossop.

== Personal life ==
Pell served as a private in the Northamptonshire Regiment during the First World War and was killed on the Western Front on 9 May 1915. He is commemorated on the Le Touret Memorial.
