= Royal Exchange (New York City) =

Building in New York City

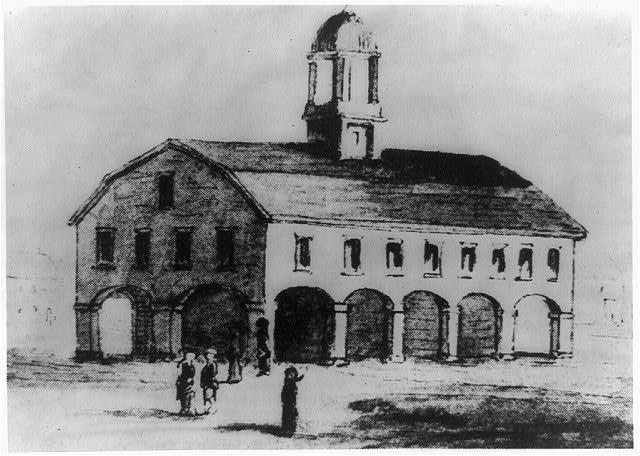
- Alternative names: Old Royal Exchange, Merchants Exchange

General information
- Location: New York City, New York, U.S.
- Estimated completion: 1675
- Renovated: 1752
- Demolished: 1799

The Royal Exchange building in New York City, later known as the Old Royal Exchange and the Merchants Exchange, (Note: Note: Not to be confused with the later 19th century building at 55 Wall Street) was a covered marketplace located near the foot of Broad Street, near its intersection with Water Street. Originally a one-story building in 1675, it was rebuilt with a meeting hall on the upper story in 1752, typical of the type of market halls found in England and Europe at the time.

The Chamber of Commerce in the City of New York (Chamber of Commerce of the State of New York after 1784) met in the building's second-floor meeting area from 1770 until the Revolutionary War. In 1785, when New York City became the nation's capital, the New York State Legislature began meeting in the building; the Congress of the Confederation had started meeting in the legislature's previous location – which became known as Federal Hall.

On November 3, 1789, the federal court for the District of New York (later the Southern District of New York) sat in the building, the first federal court to sit under the new Constitution. The first District Court Judge was James Duane. The court's earliest business in the building included admitting local lawyers to the bar, including Aaron Burr. The court moved to Federal Hall in 1791.

The U.S. Supreme Court held its inaugural session in the building February 2–10, 1790. Before the court convened, city officials moved the market's butchers and placed chains across the street so as to spare the court "interruption from the noise of carts." A second session was held in August 1790. The court met in New York for a total of twelve days. In 1791, it moved, with the rest of the federal government, to Philadelphia in the old City Hall building.

The Royal Exchange building was demolished in 1799.
