= Jacob Griffin =

American politician

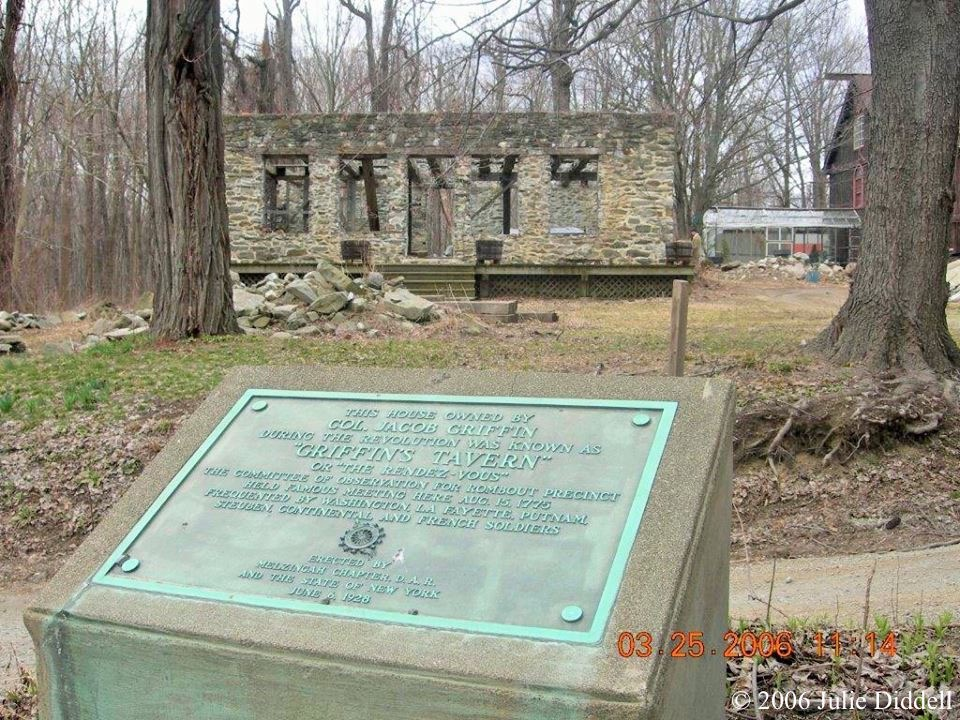
Griffin's Tavern, Revolutionary War landmark. Owner Col Jacob Griffin.

Jacob Griffin (April 1730 – 20 March 1800) was a Revolutionary War colonel serving in the New York, Dutchess County, Rombout Precinct Militia.

He rose through the ranks, first commissioned as a captain in 1775, then promoted to major and finally, in 1778 to lieutenant colonel. Griffin served first as commander of his company and then lieutenant colonel in Colonel Abraham Brinckerhoff's 2nd Regiment and finally in Colonel Morris Graham's and Roswell Hopkins' 6th Regiment. As captain, from 13 July until 27 September 1775, and as the Chairman of the Rombout Committee of Correspondence, Griffin hosted meetings of the Committee of Observation of the Rombout Precinct as it supervised the signing of the Articles of Association by the men of the precinct, including his own company, aligning themselves with the Continental Congress against the British Parliament. He served in the New York State Legislature as an assemblyman from Dutchess County from 1785 to 1787 and 1788 to 1790.
