= Jonathan Nicoll Havens =

American politician (1757–1799)

Member of the U.S. House of Representatives from New York's 1st district
- In office March 4, 1795 – October 25, 1799
- Preceded by: Thomas Tredwell
- Succeeded by: John Smith

Personal details
- Born: June 18, 1757 Shelter Island, Province of New York, British America
- Died: October 25, 1799 (aged 42) Shelter Island, New York, U.S.
- Party: Democratic-Republican
- Parent(s): Nicoll Floyd Haven; Sarah Fosdick Havens
- Education: Yale College

Jonathan Nicoll Havens (June 18, 1757 – October 25, 1799) was a politician from New York.

== Early life ==
Havens was born on Shelter Island, New York on June 18, 1757. He was the only son born to Nicoll Floyd Havens (1733–1783) and Sarah (née Fosdick) Havens (1730–1767). After the death of his mother in 1767, his father remarried to Desire Brown. Among his siblings were Esther Sarah Havens (wife of New York Assemblyman Sylvester Dering) and Mary Catherine Havens (wife of Ezra L'Hommedieu). Among his younger half siblings were Catherine Mary Havens (who married New York State Senator Henry Huntington) and New York banker Rensselaer Havens.

His paternal grandparents were Jonathan Havens and Catherine (née Nicoll) Havens (a sister of Speaker of the New York General Assembly William Nicoll Jr. Through his grandmother, he was a direct descendant of English-born politician William Nicoll, who is best remembered for his vehement opposition to the Leisler Rebellion, and his wife, Anna (née Van Rensselaer) Nicoll (widow of the patroon Kiliaen van Rensselaer, and daughter of Jeremias van Rensselaer).

He graduated from Yale College in 1777.

== Career ==
He was Shelter Island town clerk from 1783 to 1787, and was on the New York delegation that in 1788 approved the new Federal Constitution following United States' independence in the American Revolutionary War. He served in the state assembly from 1786 until 1795. He was elected to the New York State Convention which ratified the Federal Constitution, in 1788 and Justice of the Peace of Suffolk County, in 1795.

Havens was elected as a Democratic-Republican to the 4th, 5th and 6th United States Congresses, serving from March 4, 1795, until his death.

== Personal life ==
Havens died on Shelter Island on October 25, 1799. He was buried at the Presbyterian Church on Shelter Island, where a memorial stone was placed in his memory.

== See also ==
- List of members of the United States Congress who died in office (1790–1899)

U.S. House of Representatives
Preceded by Thomas Tredwell	Member of the U.S. House of Representatives from New York's 1st congressional district 1795–1799	Succeeded by John Smith
