= Thomas Tredwell =

American politician (1743–1831)

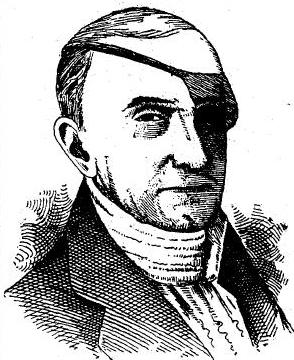

Member of the U.S. House of Representatives from New York's 1st district
- In office May 1791 - March 3, 1795
- Preceded by: William Floyd
- Succeeded by: Jonathan Nicoll Havens

Personal details
- Born: February 6, 1743 Smithtown, Province of New York, British America
- Died: December 30, 1831 (aged 88) Plattsburgh, New York, U.S.
- Party: Anti-Administration
- Relations: Thomas Treadwell Davis

Thomas Tredwell (February 6, 1743 – December 30, 1831) was an American lawyer and politician from Plattsburgh, New York. He served in the New York State Senate and represented New York in the United States House of Representatives from 1791 to 1795.

== Biography ==
Tredwell was born in Smithtown in the Province of New York on February 6, 1743. He graduated from Princeton College in 1764 where he studied law. He was admitted to the bar and began practice in Plattsburgh. He owned slaves. He lost his eye when it was pierced by a twig while he was riding a horse

He was a delegate to the Provincial Congress of New York in 1774 and 1775 and a delegate to the State constitutional convention in 1776 and 1777. He was a member of the New York State Assembly from 1777 to 1783; judge of the court of probate from 1778 to 1787; served in the New York State Senate from 1786 to 1789; surrogate of Suffolk County, New York from 1787 to 1791; and delegate to the State ratification convention in 1788.

Tredwell was elected to the 2nd United States Congress as an Anti-Administration man to fill the vacancy caused by the death of James Townsend, after previously being a candidate for the same seat in 1790, and was re-elected to the 3rd United States Congress, serving from May 1791 to March 3, 1795. He was one of seven representatives to vote against the Fugitive Slave Act of 1793.

He was a delegate to the New York State Constitutional Convention of 1801. He was again a member of the New York State Senate (Eastern D.) from 1804 to 1807 and surrogate of Clinton County, New York from 1807 to 1831.

He died in Plattsburgh, New York on December 30, 1831, and is interred in a private burial ground in Beekmantown, New York.

== Family life ==
Tredwell's grandson Thomas Treadwell Davis also represented New York in the United States House of Representatives.

U.S. House of Representatives
Preceded by William Floyd	Member of the U.S. House of Representatives from New York's 1st congressional district 1791–1795	Succeeded by Jonathan Nicoll Havens
