= Philip Pell =

American politician

Philip Pell (July 7, 1753 – May 1, 1811) was an American politician and lawyer from Westchester County, New York. He served in the New York State Assembly and as a delegate for New York to the Confederation Congress.

Pell Street in New York Chinatown is named after him.

== Early life and education ==
Philip was born to the aristocratic Pell family, at the manor house in what is now Pelham. The family had established itself in the area in 1654 when Thomas Pell bought nearly 10,000 acres (40 km^{2}) from the Indians. Thomas' nephew John, named the entire tract Pelham Manor, and was viewed as the second lord of the manor. Philip was the third to have that name, and is sometimes known as Philip Pell Jr. or Philip Pell, III.

Pell graduated from King's College (now Columbia University) in New York City in 1770. He read law, was admitted to the bar, and practiced in Westchester County and New York City.

== Military career ==
As the Revolutionary War began, he was a Lieutenant in the Westchester militia. His unit became part of the Continental Army in 1776. He served through 1779, when elected to the New York State Assembly.

After one term in the Assembly, Pell rejoined the Continental Army, this time as a colonel. He served as Judge Advocate General from 1781 until 1783, and was a member of General George Washington's staff at the evacuation of the city of New York in 1783 when the British advanced on the city.

== Political career ==
After leaving the army again, Pell resumed his political career, serving once more in the State Assembly and then as a New York delegate to the final session of the Confederation Congress (1788–1789).

When the Confederation Congress met for the last time on March 2, 1789, two days before the federal government began operations under the new Constitution, Pell and the Congress' secretary, Charles Thomson, were the only ones present. Their only action that day was to adjourn Congress sine die.

== Later life and death ==
An active and vocal Anti-Federalist who opposed the new frame of government, Pell subsequently withdrew from national and state politics. He did keep his local office as the surrogate for Westchester County until 1800.

Philip died at Pelhamdale in Pelham Manor in 1811 and is buried the St. Paul's Churchyard, in what is now part of the City of Mount Vernon, a suburb of New York City.
