= Cumberland County, New York =

Former county of New York colony

Coordinates: 43°20′N 72°30′W

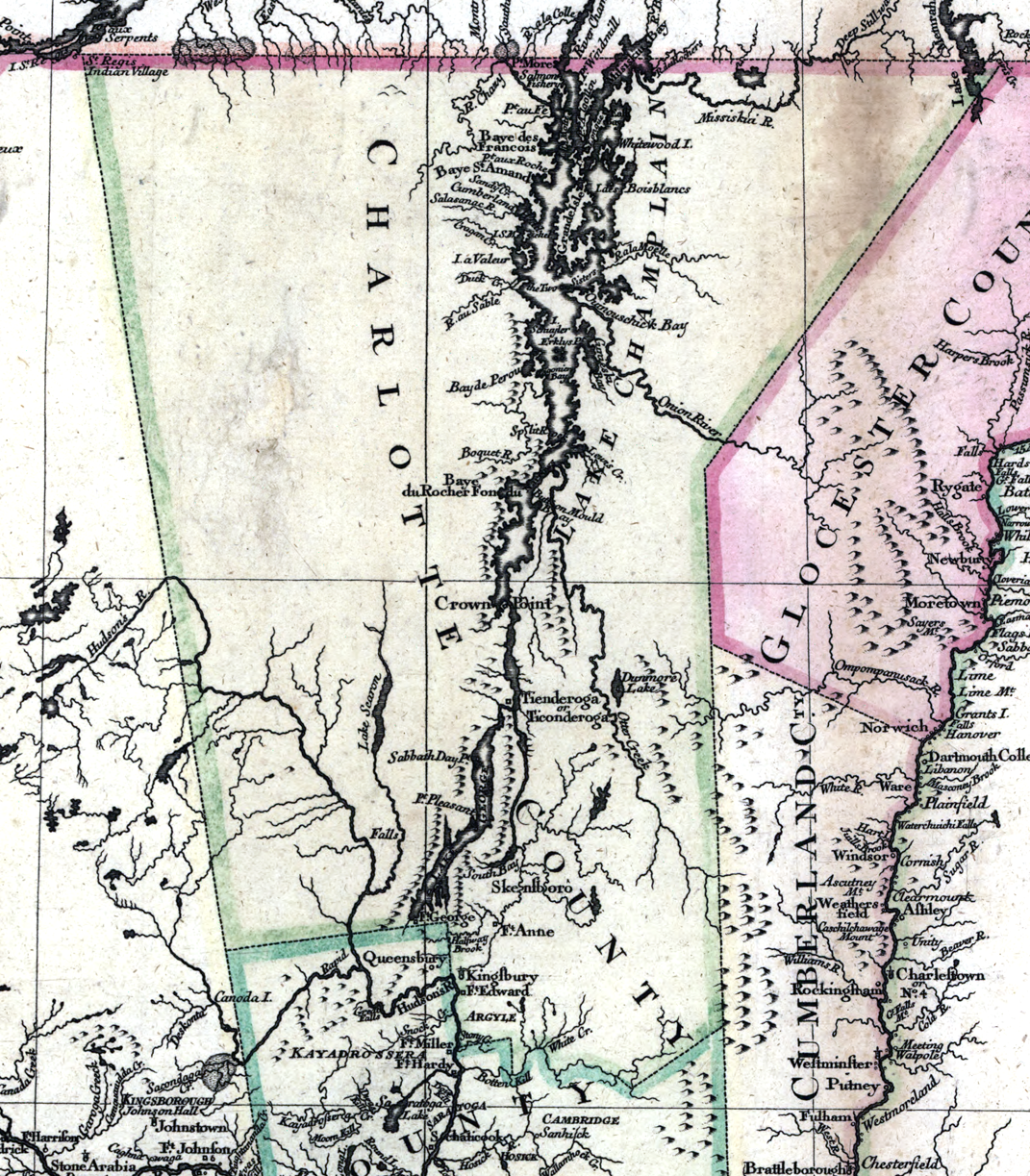
Cumberland County in 1777

Cumberland County, New York, was a county in the Province of New York that became part of the Vermont Republic. It was divided out of Albany County in 1766, and abandoned by the new State of New York in 1777 (defacto ceded to the Vermont Republic).

It became part of Cumberland County, Vermont Republic, on 17 March 1778, established by combining lands from Cumberland County, Province of New York, and Gloucester County, Province of New York, previously ceded to the Republic.

== History ==
Cumberland County, New York, was Located south of Gloucester County and east of Charlotte County, Province of New York. Incorporated from Albany County (as was Charlotte County), it was created in 1766, reverted in 1767, and re-created in 1768.

On June 6, 1775, a Committee of Correspondence of the County met in Westminster, Province of New York, to complain about the tax acts passed by Parliament without colonial representation. Major William Williams, later a Colonel in Ethan Allen's 1st Regiment, represented the County as Delegate to the New York Provincial Congress from 1775 to 1776 (the Second Provincial Congress). It was abandoned de facto by the authorities in 1777, but was de jure part of New York until 1791, when the Vermont Republic was admitted to the Union as the State of Vermont. In between it was absorbed by the Vermont Republic, combined by it with Gloucester County in 1778, then was extinguished there in 1781 when partitioned into three other counties: Orange, Windham, and Windsor.

== See also ==
- List of former United States counties
- List of counties in Vermont
- New Hampshire Grants
