= John Haring =

American politician

- Born: September 28, 1739; Tappan, New York, British America
- Died: April 1, 1809 (aged 69); Blauvelt, New York, U.S.
- Resting place: Reformed Church of Tappan, Tappan, New York, U.S.
- Occupation: Lawyer
- Known for: Delegate to Continental Congress, Congress of the Confederation
- Spouse: Maria (m. 1773)
- Children: 10

John Haring (September 28, 1739 – April 1, 1809) was an American lawyer from New York. During his long political career, he was a delegate to the First Continental Congress and Congress of the Confederation, served as president pro tempore of the New York Provincial Congress, served in both the New York State Legislature and New Jersey Legislature, and was a presidential elector. (Note: Haring was not a signer of the Declaration of Independence, Articles of Confederation, or Constitution—being a signer of at least one of those documents is one definition used for "Founding Fathers".)

== Biography ==
Haring was born to a large Dutch family at Tappan, New York, which was then part of Orange County. He was the fourth of eight children. His parents were Colonel Abraham and Martyntje (Bogart) Haring, and he was christened "Jan" at the Dutch Reformed Church of Tappan. He remained a member of that church throughout his life. Haring attended school and read law in New York City and was admitted to the bar. He practiced both in the city and in Orange County. He married a cousin, Maria Haring, on October 3, 1773. The couple went on to have ten children.

Haring took his place in a family that was locally prominent. He served as a county judge. As the American Revolution neared, he became a member, and then head, of Orange County's committee of correspondence. On July 4, 1774, the community of Orangetown adopted the Orangetown Resolutions, which objected to the British "act for shutting up the port of Boston" and proposed "stopping of all exportation and importation to and from Great Britain and the West Indies"—Haring was one of five men named "to correspond with the [City of New York, and to conclude and agree upon such measures as they shall judge necessary in order to obtain a repeal of said acts." When Haring was sent to the First Continental Congress in Philadelphia, it adopted the Continental Association on October 20, 1774, which contained similar language calling for a trade boycott against British merchants; (Note: On May 13, 1774, the Boston Town Meeting had also passed a resolution calling for an economic boycott of British goods.) however, Haring was one of three members of the Continental Congress who did not sign the Continental Association.

Haring was elected to the New York Provincial Congress (or revolutionary government) five times, from 1775 to 1777. In two of those sessions, he was the president pro tempore of that body. In 1780, Haring and one of his daughters attended the hanging of John André, a British Army major who was executed as a spy. Haring served in the New York State Senate from 1781 to 1789.

Haring was returned to the Continental Congress from 1785 to 1787 (now referred to as the Congress of the Confederation to distinguish it from the Congresses of 1774–1781).

In 1784, the New York State Legislature was busy revising vestiges of the various laws and institutions from their colonial form to one befitting a free state. A new charter was adopted for King’s College in New York City (which had been formed in 1754 by a charter from the crown), incorporating it as Columbia College. The new charter established a board of regents, of which Haring was one of the original 24 members. He remained in that post until 1787. (Note: In 1787, the New York State Legislature repealed the act of 1784 and named new trustees for Columbia College.)

In 1788, Haring was a delegate to the New York state convention that ratified the United States Constitution. His vote, however, was against ratification, since he believed a stronger recognition of state and individual rights was required. In 1794, Haring removed to Bergen County, New Jersey, and was a member of the New Jersey Legislature in 1795–96. About 1804, he returned to Tappan, New York, and was a presidential elector in 1804, voting for Thomas Jefferson and George Clinton.

He returned to the state legislature as a member of the New York State Assembly in 1806.

Haring died at Blauvelt, New York, on April 1, 1809, and is buried in the cemetery of the Reformed Church of Tappan. He left his wife, Maria, $800 ($16,468 in 2025) along with a "Negro woman slave". Maria lived another 16 years.

== See also ==
- Committee of Sixty
- Council of Appointment
