= William Floyd =

American Founding Father and politician (1734–1821)

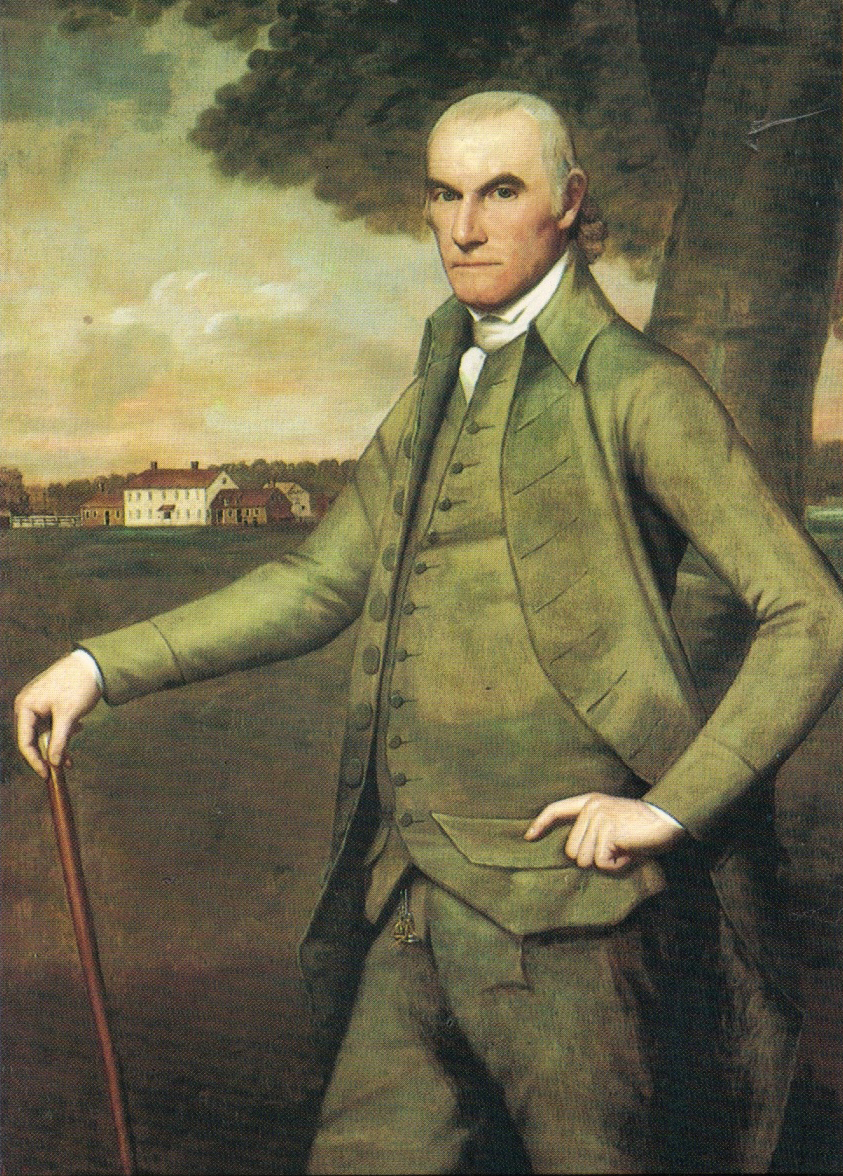
- Floyd in a 1792 oil painting by Ralph Earl

Member of the U.S. House of Representatives from New York's 1st district
- In office March 4, 1789 – March 3, 1791
- Preceded by: New district
- Succeeded by: Thomas Tredwell

Personal details
- Born: December 17, 1734 Brookhaven, Province of New York, British America
- Died: August 4, 1821 (aged 86) Westernville, New York, U.S.
- Party: Democratic-Republican
- Spouses: Hannah Jones (m. 1760; died 1781) Joanna Strong (before 1821)
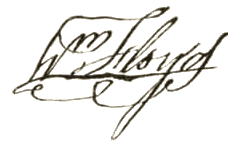
- Signature

William Floyd (December 17, 1734 – August 4, 1821) was an American Founding Father, wealthy farmer, and political leader from New York. Floyd served as a delegate to the Continental Congress and was a signer of the Continental Association and Declaration of Independence. In August 1776, a few weeks after the Declaration was signed, British forces defeated an American army at the battle of Long Island and confiscated Floyd's house and estate, using the property as a base for their cavalry units over the next seven years. Floyd remained active in politics throughout the Revolutionary Era, served as a major general in the New York State militia, and was elected to the first U.S. Congress in 1789.

== Early life ==
Floyd was born on December 17, 1734, in Brookhaven, Province of New York, on Long Island into a family of English and Welsh origins. He was the son of Tabitha (née Smith) Floyd and Nicoll Floyd (1705–1755). Among his siblings was sister Ruth Floyd, who married Brigadier General Nathaniel Woodhull; (Note: Brig. Gen. Nathaniel Woodhull was the uncle of Abraham Cooper Woodhull, also known in the spy ring as "spy 722 or Samuel Culper Sr".) sister Charity Floyd, who married Continental Congressmen Ezra L'Hommedieu; and brother Charles Floyd, who married Margaret Thomas in 1761.

William's great-grandfather was Richard Floyd, who was born in Brecknockshire, Wales, in about 1620 and was the last of his brothers to leave England, first visiting Jamestown, Virginia, before settling in the Province of New York around 1640 where he practiced law. Around 1688, his grandfather purchased 4,400 acres from Tangier Smith's family in the Mastic Neck of the Town of Brookhaven. William's father Nicoll built a house there in 1723 where William was born. (Note: Richard Floyd, who is buried at the Presbyterian Church in Setauket, New York, was the grandfather of Charity Floyd Johnson, the mother of William Samuel Johnson, a signer of the U.S. Constitution.)

== Career ==
After his father's death in 1755, William took over the family farm. He became a member of the Suffolk County Militia in the early stages of the American Revolutionary War, becoming Major General. He was a delegate from New York to the Continental Congress from 1774 to 1776. He was a member of the New York State Senate (Southern District) from 1777 to 1788.

On July 4, 1787, he was elected an honorary member of the New York Society of the Cincinnati. In March 1789, he was elected to the 1st United States Congress under the new Constitution as an Anti-Administration candidate and served until March 3, 1791. Floyd was a presidential elector in 1792, voting for George Washington and George Clinton. Floyd, for whom the town of Floyd, New York, is named, became a resident of Oneida County in 1794.

In 1795, Floyd ran for Lieutenant Governor of New York with Robert Yates on the Democratic-Republican ticket, but they were defeated by Federalists John Jay and Stephen Van Rensselaer. Floyd was again a presidential elector in 1800, voting for Thomas Jefferson and Aaron Burr; and in 1804, voting for Jefferson and George Clinton. Floyd was a member of the state senate (Western District) in 1808.

In 1820, Floyd was chosen a presidential elector but did not attend the meeting of the electoral college, and Martin Van Buren was appointed to fill the vacancy. In the 1820 Census, when Floyd was 86, he had 6 slaves and 2 free black residents lived in his household at the General William Floyd House in Westernville, New York.

== Personal life ==
=== Family ===
In 1760, Floyd was married to Hannah Jones (1740–1781), who was born in Southampton, New York, and was the daughter of William Jones. Together, they were the parents of:

- Nicoll Floyd (1762–1852), who married Phoebe Gelston (1770–1836), daughter of David Gelston (collector of the Port of New York), in 1789.
- Mary Floyd (1764–1805), who married Colonel Benjamin Tallmadge, who was in charge of President George Washington's spy ring.
- Catherine Floyd (1767–1832), who married Reverend William Clarkson (1763–1812).

After the death of his first wife in 1781, Floyd remarried to Joanna Strong (1747–1826), who was born in Setauket, New York, and was the daughter of Benajah Strong and Martha (née Mills) Strong. Together, they were the parents of:

- Ann Floyd (1785–1857), who married George Washington Clinton (1771–1809), son of George Clinton, the first Governor of New York and the fourth Vice President of the United States.
- Elizabeth Floyd (1789–1820), who married James Platt (1788–1870), youngest son of Continental Congressmen Zephaniah Platt.
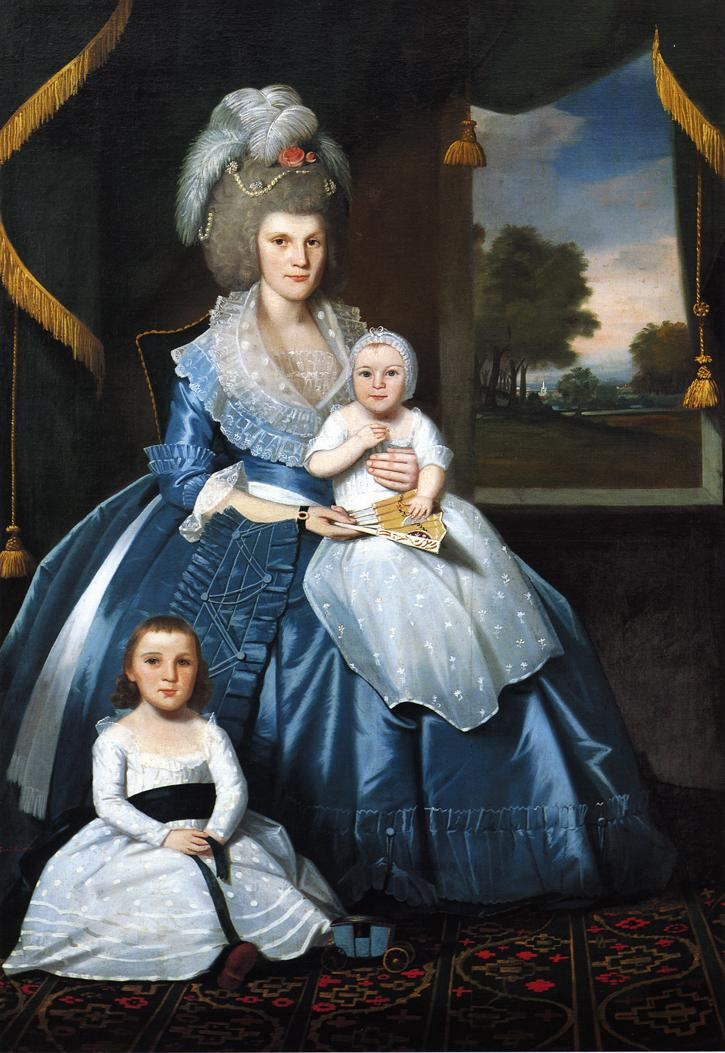
Portrait of Mrs. Benjamin Tallmadge with son Henry Floyd and daughter Maria Jones 1790

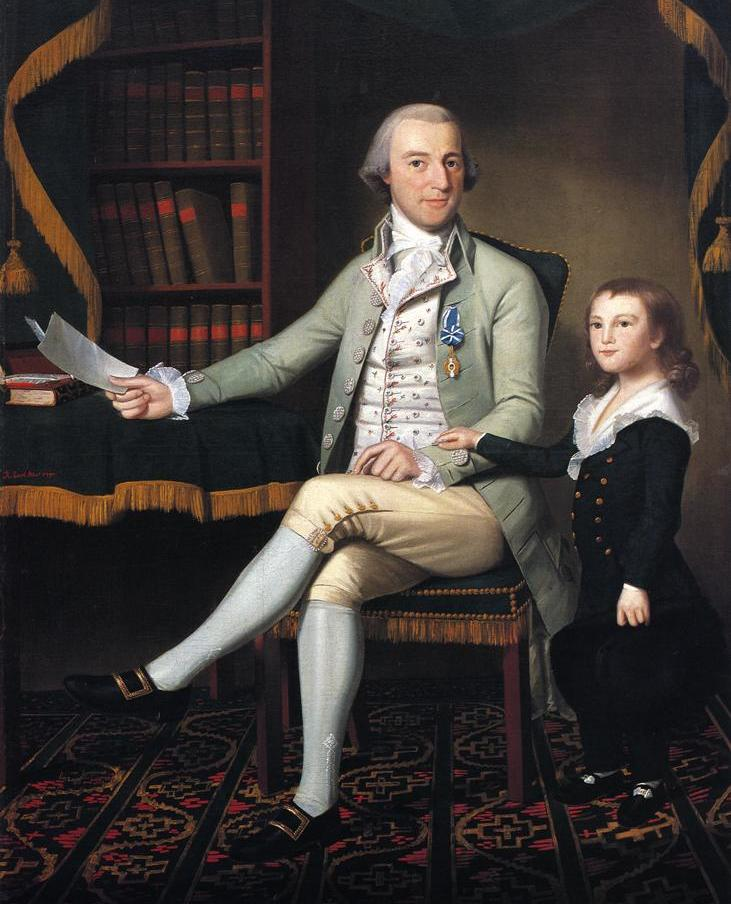
Portrait of Benjamin Tallmadge with son William 1790

=== Residence and estate ===
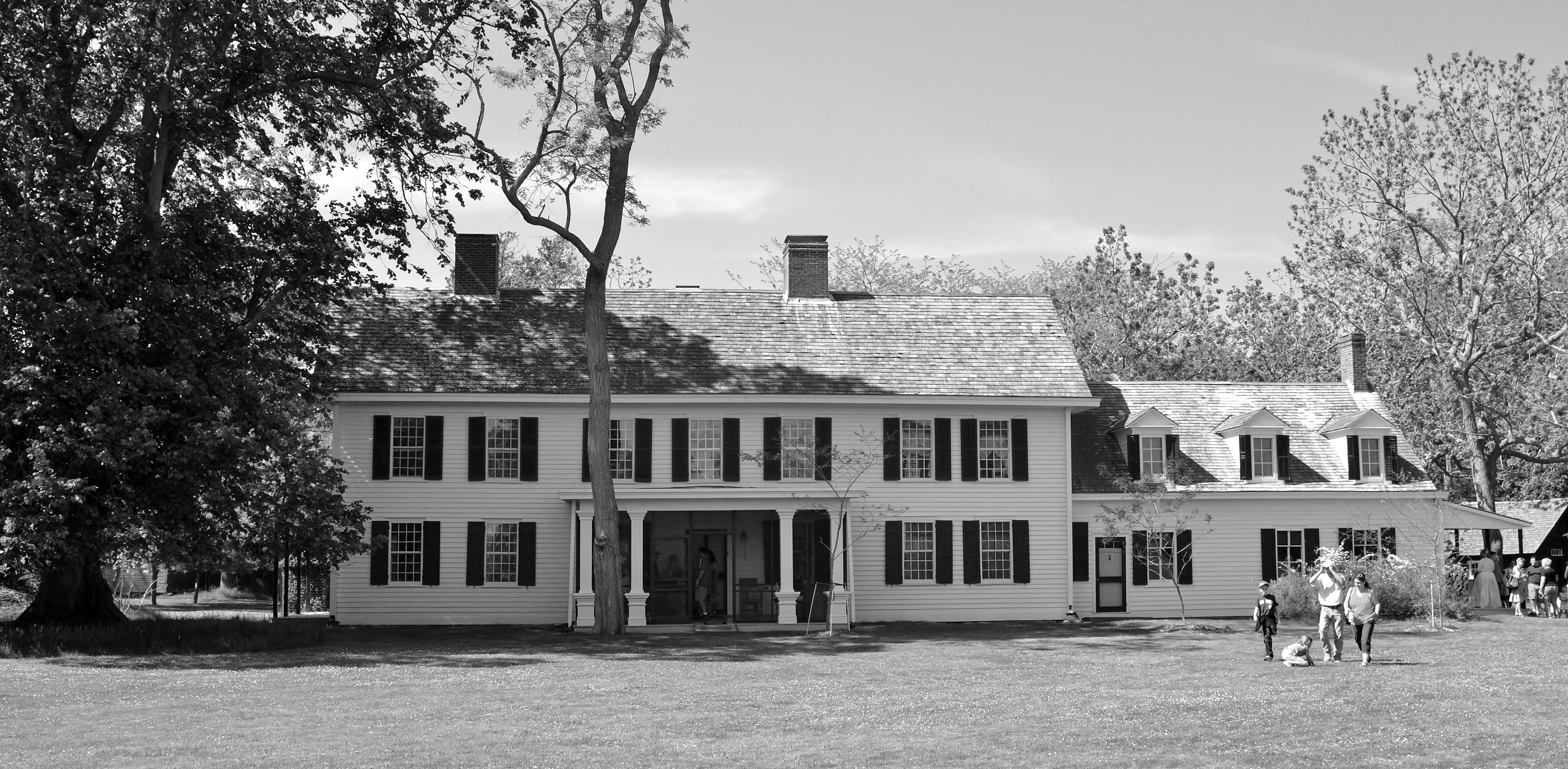
The William Floyd Estate.

The William Floyd House, the family home, is located in Mastic Beach, is part of Fire Island National Seashore and is open to visitors. It consists of the home, grounds and a cemetery of the Floyd family. Over the course of 200 years, eight generations of Floyds have managed the 25-room mansion and 613-acre property. Prior to the 20th century, the estate was much larger. (Note: The husband of William's great-granddaughter Katherine "Kitty" Floyd, William Buck Dana, carved out a settlement between the five children of Floyd's grandson, John Gelston Floyd (i.e. Katherine, Sarah, August, John Jr. and Nichol). Sarah and Kitty were each given about 200 acres initially. John Jr. got the 600+-acre piece that is what remains today of the William Floyd Estate and is now in control of the National Park Service. August got a large piece just north of that and also the Woodhull estate that became the original section one of Mastic Beach. Nichol's land was just north of Gus'. Kitty was also given a separate deed in 1880 for 20 prime acres that fronted on both the south shore of the Poospatuck Creek and 1,500 feet on the western bank of Forge River.)

=== Descendants ===
Through his son Nicoll, he was a grandfather of U.S. Representative John Gelston Floyd, and Mary Floyd, who married John Lawrence Ireland (grandson of New York State Senator Jonathan Lawrence). Through his daughter Catherine, he was the grandfather of Harriet Ashton (née Clarkson) Crosby (1786–1859), and great-grandfather of New York State Senator Clarkson Floyd Crosby, who married Angelica Schuyler, daughter of John Schuyler.

== Death and legacy ==
Floyd died on August 4, 1821, and is buried at the Westernville Cemetery in Oneida County. His widow died in 1826.

There are several places named after William Floyd, including:

- William Floyd School District in present-day Brookhaven Town, which includes William Floyd Elementary, William Floyd middle school, and William Floyd High School.
- William Floyd Parkway in the Town of Brookhaven.
- Town of Floyd in Oneida County.
- General William Floyd Elementary School in the Holland Patent School District in Oneida County

== See also ==
- Memorial to the 56 Signers of the Declaration of Independence

== Notes ==
U.S. House of Representatives
Preceded by (none)	Member of the U.S. House of Representatives from New York's 1st congressional district 1789–1791	Succeeded by Thomas Tredwell
