= Ezra L'Hommedieu =

American politician (1734–1811)

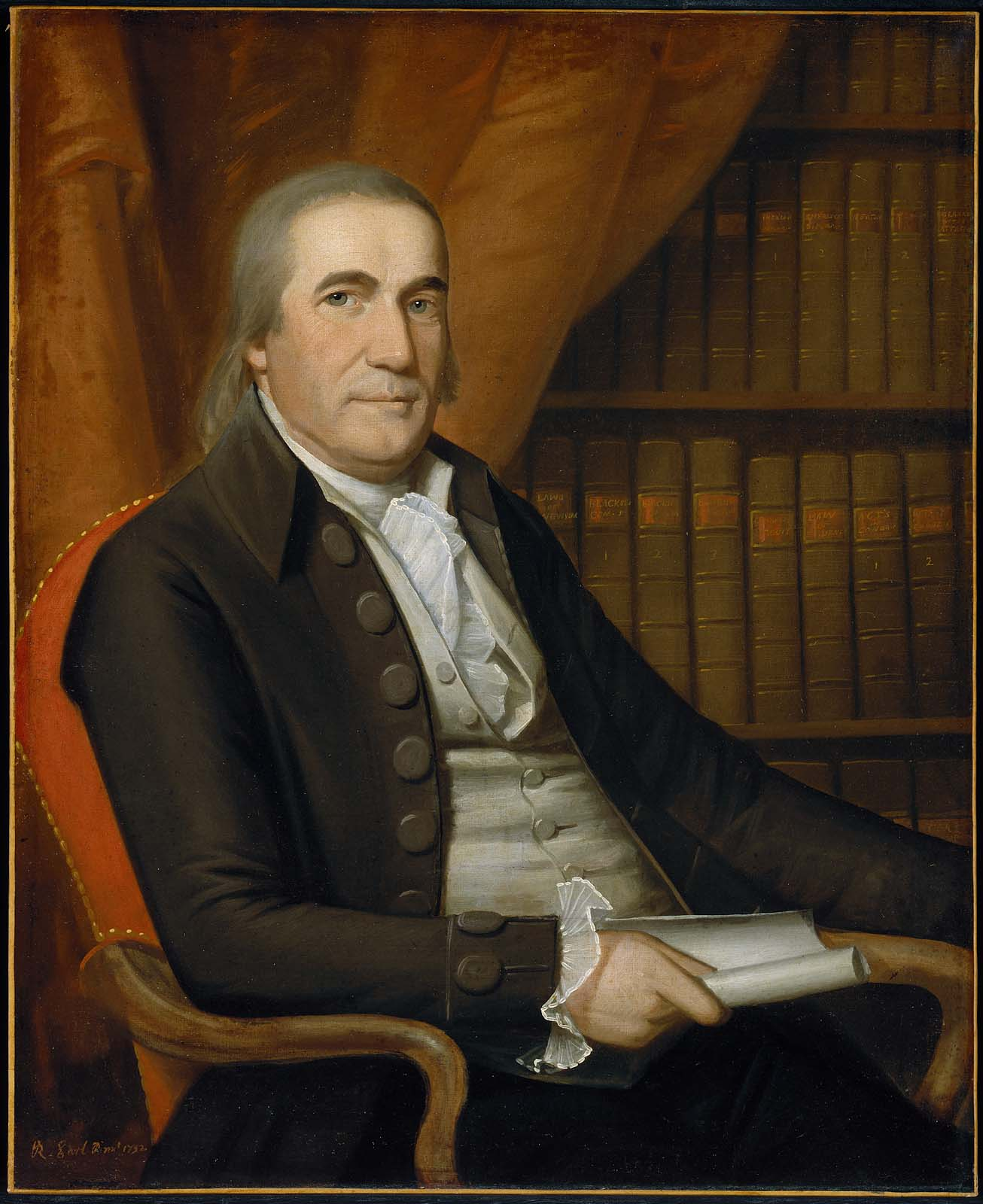
- Portrait of L'Hommedieu by Ralph Earl, 1792

Member of the New York State Senate for the Southern District
- In office 1794–1809
- In office 1784–1792

Member of the New York State Assembly for Suffolk County
- In office 1777–1783
- Preceded by: Inaugural holder

Member of the Continental Congress
- In office 1779–1783, 1788

Personal details
- Born: August 30, 1734 Southold, Province of New York, British America
- Died: September 27, 1811 (aged 77) Southold, New York, U.S.
- Spouses: Charity Floyd (m. 1756; died 1785) Mary Catharine Havens (m. 1803)
- Parent(s): Benjamin L'Hommedieu; Martha Bourn
- Education: Yale College

Ezra L'Hommedieu (August 30, 1734 – September 27, 1811) was an American lawyer and statesman from Southold, New York, in Suffolk County, Long Island. He was a delegate for New York to the Continental Congress (1779 to 1783) and again in 1788. His national offices overlapped with those he served in the state: in the State Assembly (1777–1783) and in the state senate (1784-1792, 1794–1809); he was a member of the state constitutional convention in 1801. He also served in local offices, as clerk of Suffolk County from January 1784 to March 1810 and from March 1811 until his death that year. He was a regent of the University of the State of New York.

Representing the New York City Chamber of Commerce to gain federal support, L'Hommedieu chose the site for the Montauk Point Lighthouse and designed it in 1796; it was the first to be built in the state. It was designated a National Historic Landmark in 2012.

== Early life ==
Ezra L'Hommedieu was born in Southold, Long Island to Benjamin and Martha (née Bourn) L'Hommedieu; they were of Dutch, English and French Huguenot ancestry. He was a great-grandson of, among others, English immigrants Nathaniel and Grizzell (née Brinley) Sylvester, who had owned all of Shelter Island (8,000 acres) in the 17th century.

He was privately educated before going to Yale College, where he graduated in 1754. He read law and established a law practice in Southold and New York City.

== Career ==
As a lawyer, L'Hommedieu came to consider British tax legislation oppressive and even "illegal." He became caught up in revolutionary fervor, moving from Long Island to Connecticut after occupation of the former in 1776 by the British, and aiding other refugees to get to the northern shore. Although George Washington had promised Continental aid to the refugees, L'Hommedieu spent his own money to help support them.

He became active in provincial and state politics, serving in the State Assembly from 1777 to 1783 and in the State Senate from 1784 to 1792 and again from 1794 to 1809. He also served in local offices, as clerk of Suffolk County from January 1784 to March 1810, and from March 1811 until his death that year.

He was appointed by the State Assembly as the state representative to the Continental Congress, serving 1779-1783 and in 1788. He continued to be politically active and in 1801 was a delegate to the state constitutional convention.

L'Hommedieu was a candidate in 1789 to become one of New York's first two United States senators, to be elected by the state legislature. In the midst of a procedural stalemate in July of that year, the New York Council of Revision held that the state assembly and senate, respectively, should name candidates until both houses concurred on two nominees. The senate confirmed the assembly's choice of Philip Schuyler for one Senate seat but rejected its second nominee, James Duane, proposing L'Hommedieu in Duane's stead. The assembly rejected L'Hommedieu by a 34-24 vote. Rufus King was thereafter approved by both houses for the second Senate seat. He was later an unsuccessful candidate for the 1st congressional district in 1790, as well as in a separate special election for the seat earlier that year.

Widely respected for his integrity and intelligence, L'Hommedieu represented the New York City Chamber of Commerce in discussions related to a lighthouse at Montauk Point, a federal project on which he advised President George Washington. He made the case that New York City "was first among American ports in the volume of its foreign commerce. By 1797, the harbor was handling a third of the nation’s trade with other countries." Because of the prevailing winds in winter, New York needed the lighthouse to aid ships approaching its harbor. L'Hommedieu chose the site for the lighthouse and designed it. Constructed in 1796, it was the first lighthouse built in New York state and the first public works project of the new United States. It was designated as a National Historic Landmark in 2012.

L'Hommedieu also developed methods of scientific farming, including the use of seashells to fertilize soils. He corresponded on farming with Thomas Jefferson, particularly about crop pests. L'Hommedieu was active in the community and served in other public positions. He served as Regent of the University of the State of New York, the founding of which he had supported.

== Personal life ==
On December 24, 1756, L'Hommedieu was married to Charity Floyd (1739–1785), a daughter of Tabitha (née Smith) Floyd and Nicholl Floyd and sister to Gen. William Floyd, a signer of the Declaration of Independence. They did not have any children.

After Charity's death, Ezra married Mary Catharine Havens (1765–1843), a daughter of Nicoll Floyd Havens and Sarah (née Fosdick) Havens and sister to U.S. Representative Jonathan Nicoll Havens, in 1803. He had children with his second wife, including:

- Mary Catherine L'Hommedieu (1807–1838), who married New York State Assemblyman Samuel Smith Gardiner (1789–1859), a son of Capt. Abraham Gardiner and Phebe (née Dayton) Gardiner, in 1823.

L'Hommedieu died at age 77. He was buried near the grave of his first wife, the former Charity Floyd, at the Old Southold Burying Ground.

=== Descendants ===
Through his children with his second wife, some of their descendants continued to live on Long Island in the 20th century. L’Hommedieu’s papers are now in the collection of the Montauk Historical Society.
