= Gloucester County, New York =

Former county in New York that became part of the state of Vermont

- Political history
1,540 square miles (4,000 km^{2}) partitioned from Albany County, New York	1770-03-16
Gained land from Cumberland County, and exchanged land with Charlotte County, raising the total county land to 3,390 square miles (8,800 km^{2})	1772-03-24
Remainder of Gloucester County ceded to the independent State of Vermont as a result of the New Hampshire Grants claim made to Congress. Gloucester was divided up into Windsor, Orange, Addison, Chittenden, Washington, Caledonia, Lamoille, Orleans, and Essex Counties in Vermont.	1777-01-15

Regional statistics
Largest cities	Bennington, Vermont; Rutland, Vermont
U.S. states	New York; Vermont
Area: Total	3,390 mi^{2} (8,780.06 km^{2})

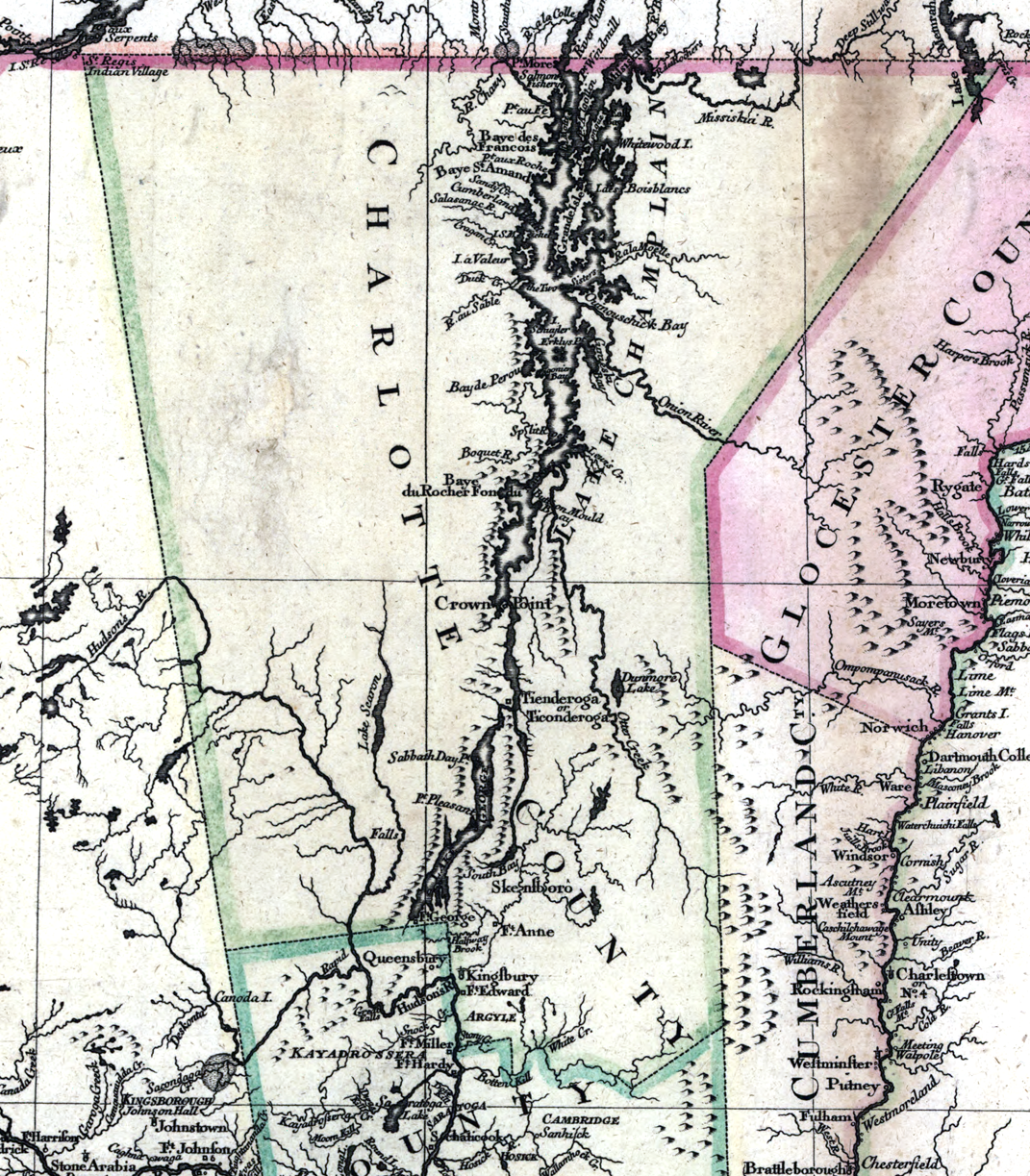
"Glocester County" in 1777

Gloucester County, New York, is a former county in New York that became part of the state of Vermont. It was a part of Albany County in the Province of New York until 1770, and was abandoned to Vermont in 1777. At that time, Vermont was holding itself out as the Vermont Republic and did not become a state until 1791.

== Name ==
The County of Gloucester name was used occasionally in contemporary documents, but the 28 February 1770 Order for Erection and many subsequent documents refer to the region as the County of Glocester. Contemporary maps also refer to the area as the County of Glocester.

== See also ==
- List of counties in Vermont
- List of former United States counties
- New Hampshire Grants
