= Gardiner Greene Howland =

American businessman (1787–1851)

- Born: September 4, 1787; New York City, New York, U.S.
- Died: November 9, 1851 (aged 64); New York City, New York, U.S.
- Resting place: Green-Wood Cemetery
- Organization(s): Howland & Aspinwall; Pacific Mail Steamship Company
- Spouses: Louisa Edgar (m. 1812; died 1826) Louisa Sophia Meredith (m. 1829)
- Relatives: Samuel Shaw Howland (brother); Joseph Howland (nephew); William Henry Aspinwall (nephew)

Gardiner Greene Howland (September 4, 1787 – November 9, 1851) was an American businessman who was a founding partner in the merchant firm of Howland & Aspinwall and a co-founder of the Pacific Mail Steamship Company.

== Early life ==
Howland was born on September 4, 1787, in New York City. He was a son of Joseph Howland (1750–1836) and Lydia (née Bill) Howland (1753–1838), who married in Norwich, Connecticut, in 1772. Among his siblings was Lydia Howland, wife of Levi Coit; Jane Abigail Howland, wife of George Muirson Woolsey (uncle to Theodore Dwight Woolsey), Harriet Howland, the third wife of New York State Assemblyman James Roosevelt; Susan Howland, who married dry goods merchant John Aspinwall (a descendant of settler William Aspinwall); and Samuel Shaw Howland.

His paternal grandparents were Abigail (née Burt) Howland and Nathaniel Howland, a descendant of John Howland, one of the Pilgrim Fathers and a signer of the 1620 Mayflower Compact, the governing document of what became Plymouth Colony. His niece Mary Rebecca Aspinwall was married to James Roosevelt's son, Isaac Roosevelt, the grandfather of U.S. President Franklin D. Roosevelt. His nephew was Union Army officer and New York State Treasurer Joseph Howland.

== Career ==
Howland and his brother Samuel found the merchant firm of G.G. & S.S. Howland, which imported high-status goods such as porcelain, silk, and tea from China, and sold them to Americans of means. In 1832, his son William Edgar Howland and nephew William Henry Aspinwall became partners in Howland & Aspinwall. Aspinwall assumed the presidency in 1835 and expanded trade to South America, China, Europe, the Mediterranean, and the East and West Indies. Howland & Aspinwall owned some of the most famous clipper ships ever built.

In 1845, while the firm owned the Ann McKim which was regarded as the fastest ship afloat, it built the Rainbow, which was even faster. The Rainbow was the high-tech racehorse of its day, and is considered to be the first of the extreme clippers. Instead of the bluff bow that was customary on ships up until that time, the Rainbow had a sharp bow, prompting on-lookers to joke that maybe she would sail better backwards. The next year, Howland & Aspinwall had the Sea Witch built, which set a speed record from China to New York which still stands. The firm and its profits made the Howlands and Aspinwalls very wealthy,

In 1840s, Aspinwall's younger brother John Lloyd Aspinwall succeeded William Henry Aspinwall as president of Howland & Aspinwall. In 1848, Howland, along with William Henry Aspinwall and Henry Chauncey, founded the Pacific Mail Steamship Company, to provide service to California. This turned out to be a rather good year in which to start a steamship line to California, since the Gold Rush started the next year. Howland & Aspinwall were also the recipients of a federal government subsidy to operate their trans-oceanic steamship line, against which they were forced to compete with the unsubsidized line owned by Cornelius Vanderbilt. The company's first vessel to make the trip was packed with passengers. Pacific Mail eventually became American President Lines, which is now part of Neptune Orient Lines.

== Personal life ==
Howland was twice married. His first marriage was to Louisa Edgar (1789–1826) on December 14, 1812. Louisa was the daughter of William Edgar. Together, they were the parents of five children, including:

- William Edgar Howland (1813–1885), who married Ann Walter Cogswell. After her death, he married Hortense La Periene.
- Annabella Edgar Howland (1816–1899), who married Rufus Leavitt (1794–1867).
- Abby Woolsey Howland (1817–1851), who married Frederick Henry Wolcott Sr. in 1838.
- Robert Shaw Howland (1820–1887), who founded Church of the Heavenly Rest in 1865 on New York's Upper East Side and was married to Mary Elizabeth Watts Woolsey, a sister of Eliza Newton Woolsey (the wife of his cousin Joseph Howland).
- Marie Louisa Howland (b. 1823), who married James Brown (1823–1847).

After the death of his first wife in 1826, he remarried to Louisa Sophia Meredith (1810–1888) on July 7, 1829. She was the daughter of Jonathan Meredith. They were the parents of:

- Rebecca Brien Howland (1831–1876), who married her second cousin James Roosevelt Sr. in 1853. After Rebecca's death, James married Sara Ann Delano and became the father of Franklin D. Roosevelt.
- Meredith Howland (1833–1912), who married Adelaide Torrance, the daughter of Daniel Torrance and Sophia Johnson (née Vanderbilt) Torrance.
- Gardiner Greene Howland Jr. (1834–1903), who married Mary Grafton Dulany in 1856 and was the general manager of the New York Herald.
- Joanna Hone Howland (b. 1842), who married Irving Grinnel (b. 1840).
- Emma Meredith Howland (1847–1849), who died in infancy.
- Samuel Shaw Howland (1849–1925), who married Fredericka Belmont, daughter of August Belmont.

Howland died on November 9, 1851, and was buried at Green-Wood Cemetery in Brooklyn, New York.

=== Descendants ===
Through his daughter Rebecca, he was a grandfather of James Roosevelt Roosevelt (1854–1927), who married Helen Schermerhorn Astor, the second daughter of businessman William Backhouse Astor Jr. and socialite Caroline Webster Schermerhorn Astor. Through his son Gardiner Jr., he was a grandfather of Maud Howland (1866–1952), who married banker, financier, and philanthropist Percy Rivington Pyne II; and Dulany Howland (1859–1915), who married Marguerite McClure. After Dulany's death, Marguerite married Ambassador Ogden H. Hammond, the father of Millicent Fenwick.

== See also ==
- Howland & Aspinwall
