= Meredith Howland =

American soldier and clubman

- Born: March 31, 1833; Flushing, New York, U.S.
- Died: April 4, 1912 (aged 79); Cannes, France
- Spouse: Adelaide Torrance (m. 1870; died 1912)
- Parent(s): Gardiner Greene Howland; Louisa Sophia Meredith
- Relatives: James R. Roosevelt (nephew); Joseph Howland (cousin)

Meredith Howland (March 31, 1833 – April 4, 1912) was an American soldier and clubman who was prominent in New York society during the Gilded Age.

== Early life ==
Howland was born in Flushing, Queens on March 31, 1833. He was the son of Louisa Sophia (née Meredith) Howland (1810–1888) and Gardiner Greene Howland (1787–1851), a prominent merchant with the firm G.G. & S.S. Howland (which employed Moses Taylor as a clerk). Among his siblings were Rebecca Brien Howland (first wife of James Roosevelt I (Note: In 1853, Rebecca Brien Howland (1831–1876) married her second cousin, James Roosevelt I (1828–1900), the son of Isaac Roosevelt. Their only child, James Roosevelt Roosevelt (1854–1927), was married to Helen Schermerhorn Astor (the daughter of William Backhouse Astor Jr. and Caroline Schermerhorn Astor). After Rebecca's death in 1876, he remarried to Sara Ann Delano, with whom he had Franklin D. Roosevelt, the future President of the United States.)) and Gardiner Greene Howland Jr. (Note: Gardiner Greene Howland, Jr. (1834–1903), the longtime general manager of the New York Herald, was the father of Maud Howland (1866–1952) who married banker, financier, and philanthropist Percy Rivington Pyne II, and Dulany Howland, who married Marguerite McClure (after Dulany's death, she married Ambassador Ogden Haggerty Hammond, the father of Millicent Fenwick).) From his father's first marriage to Louisa Edgar, he was the younger half-brother of William Edgar Howland, (Note: William Edgar Howland (1813–1885) became a partner in G.G. & S.S. Howland in 1832, the same year as cousin William Henry Aspinwall (son of John Aspinwall and Susan (née Howland) Aspinwall) joined and the family firm was renamed Howland & Aspinwall.) Abby Woolsey Howland, (Note: Abby Woolsey Howland (1817–1851) was married to Frederick Henry Wolcott (1808–1883) in 1838.) and the Rev. Robert Shaw Howland. (Note: The Rev. Robert Shaw Howland (1820–1887), who founded Church of the Heavenly Rest in 1865 on New York's Upper East Side, was married to Mary Elizabeth Watts Woolsey (1832–1864), a sister of Eliza Newton Woolsey (the wife of his cousin Joseph Howland).)

His paternal grandparents were Joseph Howland and Lydia (née Bill) Howland. His maternal grandfather was Jonathan Meredith. His first cousin was Union Army officer and New York State Treasurer Joseph Howland, the son of his uncle Samuel Shaw Howland, a co-founder of G.G. & S.S. Howland. (Note: Joseph Howland (1834–1886) was married to abolitionist author Eliza Newton Woolsey Howland (1826–1917).) The first American Howland ancestor was John Howland, one of the Pilgrim Fathers and a signer of the 1620 Mayflower Compact, the governing document of what became Plymouth Colony.

== Career ==
During the U.S. Civil War, Howland served as a paymaster under Colonel Marshall Lefferts in the Union Army's 7th New York Militia infantry regiment. The 7th Regiment was known as a "Silk Stocking" regiment due to the disproportionate number of its members who were part of New York City's social elite,

=== Society life ===
In 1892, Howland was included in Ward McAllister's "Four Hundred", purported to be an index of New York's best families, published in The New York Times. Conveniently, 400 was the number of people that could fit into Mrs. Astor's ballroom.

== Personal life ==
In 1870, Howland was married to Adelaide Torrance (1846–1932), the daughter of Daniel Torrance and Sophia Johnson (née Vanderbilt) Torrance. Adelaide's maternal grandfather was Commodore Cornelius Vanderbilt and her paternal grandfather was merchant John Torrance. Among her siblings were Marie Torrance (who married John A. Hadden Jr.), and Alfred Torrance (who married Louise Post and then divorced so Louise could marry Frederick W. Vanderbilt). The Howlands lived mostly in Paris and Cannes (at the Villa Dubosc), where his wife became known as a prominent hostess (befriending Marcel Proust) and "indefatigable bridgeplayer."

Howland, who did not have any surviving children, died in Cannes, France on April 4, 1912, and was buried at Woodlawn Cemetery in the Bronx. After his death, his wife remained in France, where she died in 1932.
