= Lloyd Aspinwall =

American lawyer and soldier

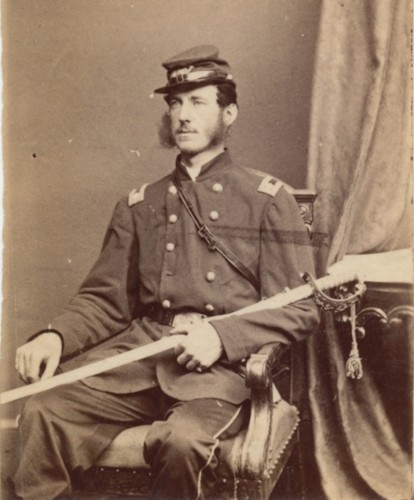
- Aspinwall during the Civil War, c. 1862
- Born: John Lloyd Aspinwall; December 12, 1834; Manhattan, New York, U.S.
- Died: September 4, 1886 (aged 51); Bristol, Rhode Island, U.S.
- Resting place: Green-Wood Cemetery
- Political party: Republican
- Spouse: Harriette Prescott D'Wolf (m. 1856)
- Children: 3
- Parent(s): William Henry Aspinwall; Anna Lloyd Breck
- Relatives: James Renwick Jr. (brother-in-law); James Roosevelt I (cousin)

John Lloyd Aspinwall (December 12, 1834 – September 4, 1886) was an American lawyer and soldier who served in the U.S. Civil War, achieving the rank of brigadier general in the U.S. National Guard.

== Early life ==
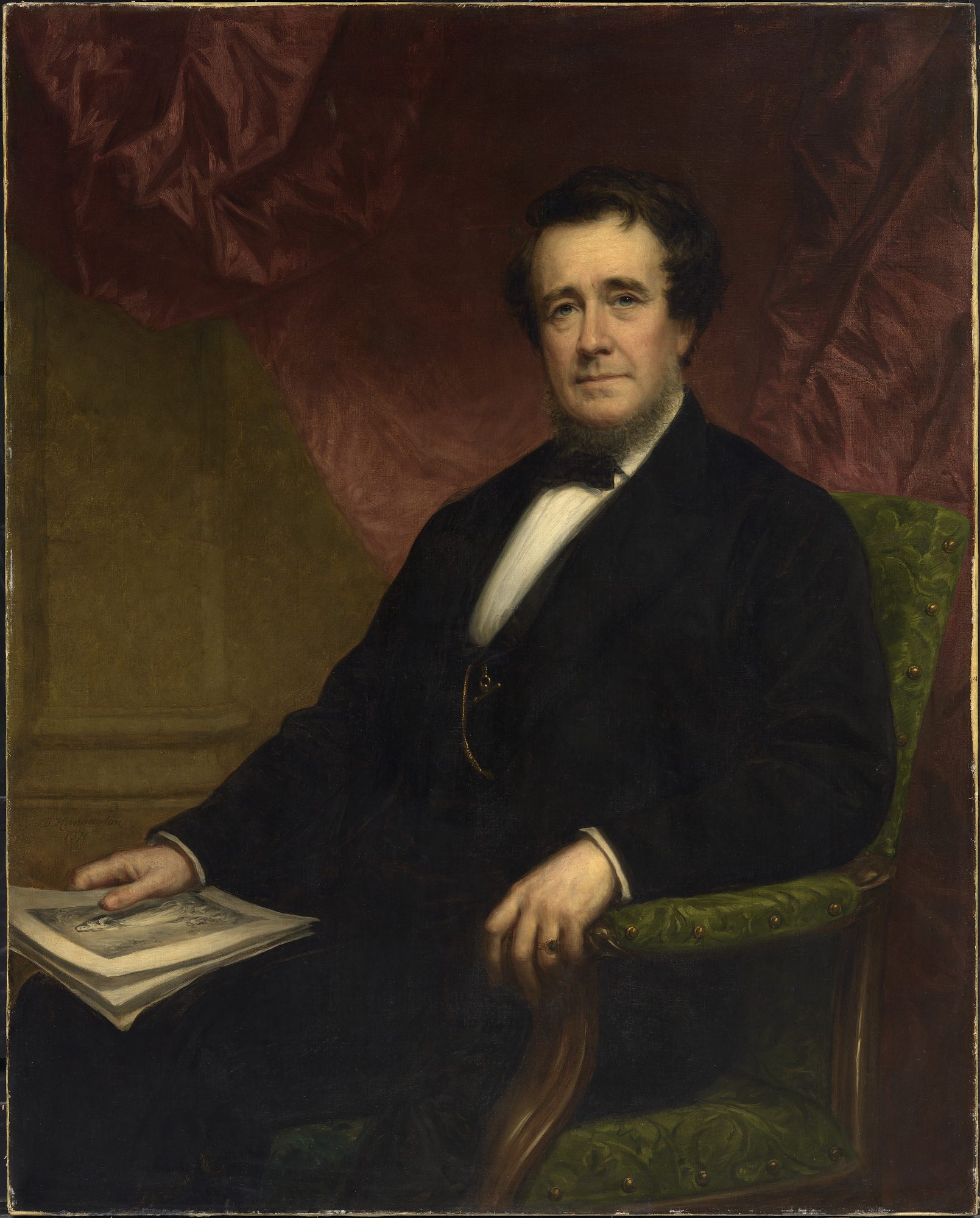
1871 portrait of Aspinwall's father, William Henry Aspinwall, by Daniel Huntington

Lloyd, as he was commonly known, was born on December 12, 1834, in Manhattan. He was the second child and oldest son of five children born to William Henry Aspinwall (1807–1875) and Anna Lloyd (née Breck) Aspinwall (1812–1885). His siblings included Anna Lloyd Aspinwall (1831–1880), who married architect James Renwick Jr. (1818–1895), Rev. John Abel Aspinwall (1840–1913), who married Julia Titus and Bessie Mary Reed, Louisa Aspinwall (1843–1913), who married John Wendell Minturn, son of merchant Robert Bowne Minturn, and Katharine Aspinwall (1847–1924), who married Ambrose Cornelius Kingsland, the son of New York Mayor Ambrose Kingsland. His father was a prominent merchant with the Howland & Aspinwall and was also a co-founder of both the Pacific Mail Steamship Company and Panama Canal Railway, companies which revolutionized the migration of goods and people to the Western Coast of the United States.

His maternal grandparents were Catherine Douce (née Israel) Breck (1789–1864) and George Breck (1784–1869), the brother of U.S. Representatives Samuel Breck and Daniel Breck. His uncle was Rev. James Lloyd Breck, an Episcopal missionary, and his aunt was Jane Breck, who married paternal uncle John Lloyd Aspinwall.

His paternal grandparents were John Aspinwall (1774–1847), a dry goods merchant firm of Gilbert & Aspinwall, and Susan Howland (1779–1852). The Howland family was descended from John Howland, a signor of the Mayflower Compact and the Aspinwall family was descended from William Aspinwall, who was among the first settlers of New England. His aunt, Mary Rebecca Aspinwall (1809–1886) was married to Isaac Roosevelt, the grandfather of U.S. President Franklin D. Roosevelt. His great-aunt, Harriet Howland, was the third wife of Isaac's father, New York State Assemblyman James Roosevelt. His paternal great-grandfather, Captain John Aspinwall, was one of the most prominent shipmasters of the New York merchant marine before the American Revolutionary War.

== Career ==
Aspinwall, a New York attorney, succeeded his father in the firm of Howland & Aspinwall, and was said to have "entered into the business full of enthusiasm and business energy. He had only fairly started upon a business career when the war began."

He also served as a trustee of the New York and Brooklyn Bridge, which built the Brooklyn Bridge from 1869 to 1883.

He was a staunch Republican, although he never held elected office. He was encouraged to seek the Mayorship of New York in 1880, considered it, but declined to seek the nomination and William Russell Grace, an anti-Tammany Democrat won election following the term of Edward Cooper.

=== U.S. Civil War ===
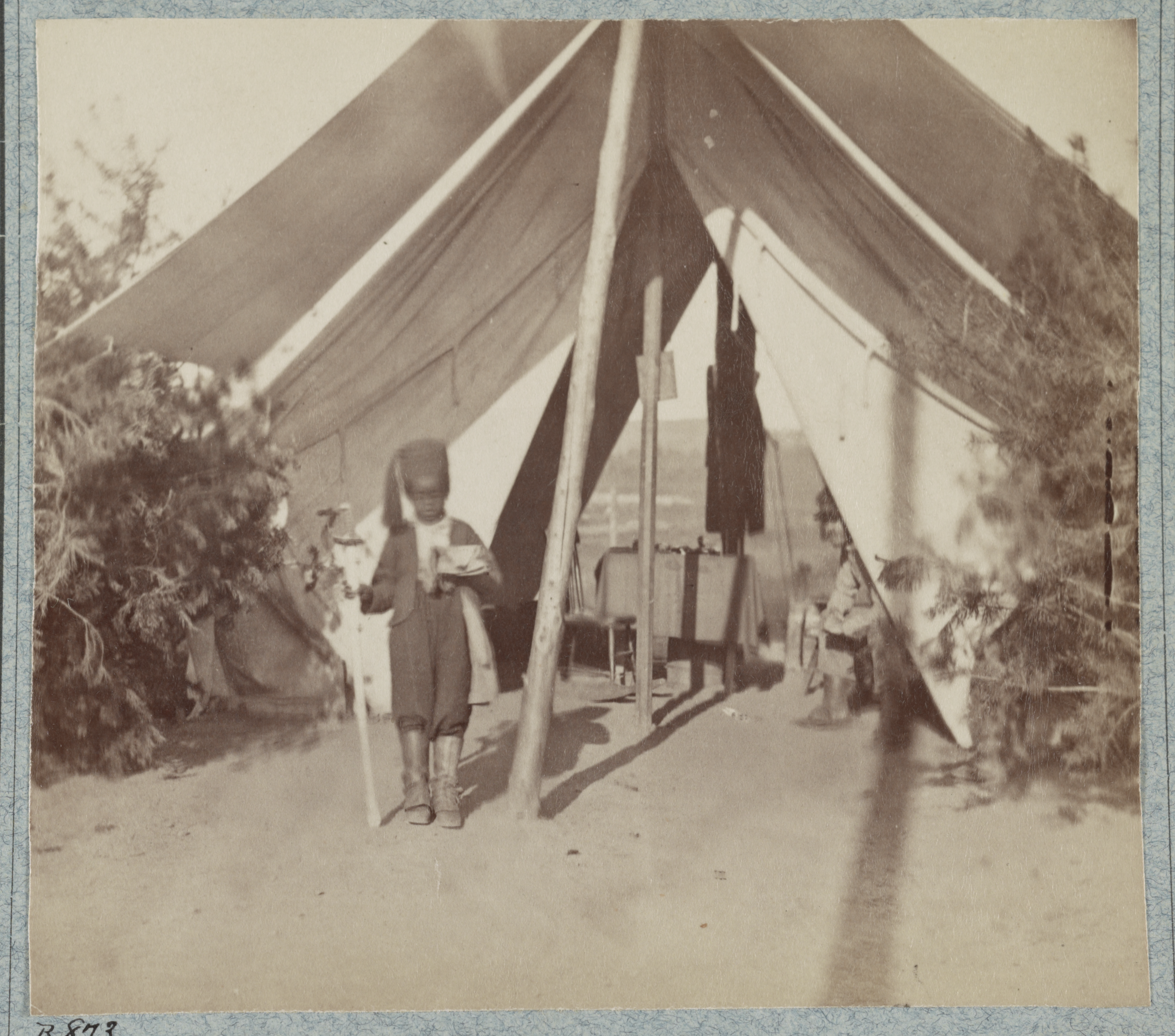
Photograph of Aspinwall's servant at Harper's Ferry, 1862. Aspinwall is visible at right, peeking out from inside the tent.

During the U.S. Civil War, he served as a Union Army officer in the 22nd New York State Militia, which he helped organize as the "Minor Grays" and included John E. Parsons, George deForest Lord and Benjamin F. Butler. Beginning in 1854, Aspinwall had trained for eight years with the New York state troops, rising from the ranks to the staff of the Fourth Artillery. On May 28, 1862, he enlisted in New York City as a lieutenant colonel and was commissioned into Field & Staff New York 22nd Infantry. After mustering out on September 5, 1862, he was again commissioned, on June 18, 1863, into the Field & Staff New York 22nd Infantry, only to muster out on July 24, 1863. He also served as an aide to General Ambrose Burnside before the Battle of Fredericksburg, and was sent to give President Abraham Lincoln the first report of the battle.

After the war ended in 1865, Aspinwall returned to business, but stayed close to the military. He served in, and was later promoted to brigadier general of the 4th Brigade, in the U.S. National Guard. At the same time, he was president of the State Military Association and was active in establishing the rifle range which was then incorporated into the military system. He was also a founder of the Army and Navy Club and became its president in 1877. He was a veteran companion of the New York Commandery of the Military Order of the Loyal Legion of the United States. In 1880, New York Governor Alonzo B. Cornell appointed him Engineer-in-Chief on his military staff, which he held until Cornell's term as governor ended on December 31, 1882.

=== Society life ===
He was a founding member of the Jekyll Island Club in Jekyll Island, Georgia. He was supposed to serve as the club's first president, however, he died unexpectedly on September 4, 1886, more than a year before the club would officially open.

He was a member of the Union Club of New York. His father, who was a co-founder of the Metropolitan Museum of Art, owned works by Bartolomé Esteban Murillo, Antonio da Correggio, Diego Velázquez, Bartholomeus van der Helst, Teniers, Peter Paul Rubens, Philips Wouwerman, Cuyp, Ary Scheffer, Gerard, Dow, Nicolaes Pieterszoon Berchem, Titian, Adriaen Brouwer, Gerard ter Borch, Paul Veronese, Mieris, and Leonardo da Vinci, Romney, Jean-Baptiste Greuze, and Jean-Baptiste Madou. He inherited several of the paintings.

== Personal life ==
On April 16, 1856, Aspinwall was married to Harriette Prescott D'Wolf (1835–1888) in Bristol, Rhode Island. She was the daughter of William Bradford D'Wolf (1810–1852) and Mary (née Russell) D'Wolf (1805–1881), and a granddaughter of U.S. Senator and Representative from Rhode Island James DeWolf. Together, Lloyd and Harriette were the parents of:

- William H. Aspinwall (1857–1910), married to Anna Lloyd Breck.
- Lloyd Aspinwall, Jr. (1862–1899), who married Cornelia Georgiana Sutton (1862–1897), daughter of merchant Cornelius Kingsland Sutton.
- Russell D'Wolf Aspinwall (1871–1874), who died young.

Aspinwall died unexpectedly of apoplexy on September 4, 1886, in Bristol, Rhode Island. He was buried at Green-Wood Cemetery in Brooklyn, New York.

=== Descendants ===
Through his son Lloyd, who died of Bright's disease at the age of 37, he was the grandfather of Lloyd Aspinwall (1883–1952), a member of the Amateur Comedy Club in Santa Barbara, California, and Beatrice Aspinwall (1889–1897), who died a few days after her mother's death in 1897.
