= Samuel Shaw Howland =

American businessman

- Born: August 15, 1790; Manhattan, New York, U.S.
- Died: February 9, 1853 (aged 62); Rome, Kingdom of Italy
- Resting place: Green-Wood Cemetery
- Organization(s): Howland & Aspinwall; Pacific Mail Steamship Company
- Spouse: Joanna Esther Hone (m. 1818; died 1848)
- Children: 7, including Joseph
- Relatives: Gardiner Greene Howland (brother); William Henry Aspinwall (nephew); Richard Howland Hunt (grandson)

Samuel Shaw Howland (August 15, 1790 – February 9, 1853) was an American businessman who was a founding partner in the merchant firm of Howland & Aspinwall and an incorporator of the Pacific Mail Steamship Company.

== Early life ==
Howland was born on August 15, 1790. He was a son of Joseph Howland Sr. (1749–1836) and Lydia (née Bill) Howland (1753–1838), who married in Norwich, Connecticut in 1772. Among his siblings were Lydia Howland (wife of Levi Coit), Jane Abigail Howland (wife of George Muirson Woolsey and uncle to Theodore Dwight Woolsey), Susan Howland (wife of John Aspinwall, a descendant of settler William Aspinwall), Harriet Howland (third wife of Assemblyman James Roosevelt), Gardiner Greene Howland, and Mary Ann Howland (wife of Ezra Conklin Woodhull).

His paternal grandparents were Abigail (née Burt) Howland and Nathaniel Howland, a descendant of John Howland, one of the Pilgrim Fathers and a signer of the 1620 Mayflower Compact, the governing document of what became Plymouth Colony. His niece Mary Rebecca Aspinwall was married to James Roosevelt's son, Isaac Roosevelt, the grandfather of U.S. President Franklin D. Roosevelt.

== Career ==
Howland and his brother Gardiner Greene Howland founded the merchant firm of G.G. & S.S. Howland, which imported high-status goods such as porcelain, silk, and tea from China, and sold them to Americans of means. In 1832, upon the admission of two of his nephews, William Edgar Howland and William Henry Aspinwall, the firm became known as Howland & Aspinwall. Aspinwall assumed the presidency in 1835 and expanded trade to South America, China, Europe, the Mediterranean, and the East and West Indies. Howland & Aspinwall owned some of the most famous clipper ships ever built.

In 1845, while the firm owned the Ann McKim which was regarded as the fastest ship afloat, it built the Rainbow, which was even faster. The Rainbow was the high-tech racehorse of its day, and is considered to be the first of the extreme clippers. Instead of the bluff bow that was customary on ships up until that time, the Rainbow had a sharp bow, prompting on-lookers to joke that maybe she would sail better backwards. The next year, Howland & Aspinwall had the Sea Witch built, which set a speed record from China to New York which still stands. The firm and its profits made the Howlands and Aspinwalls very wealthy,

In 1840s, another nephew, John Lloyd Aspinwall, succeeded William Henry Aspinwall (John was William's younger brother) as president of the firm. In 1848, the Howlands, along with William Henry Aspinwall and Samuel's son-in-law Henry Chauncey, founded the Pacific Mail Steamship Company, to provide service to California. This turned out to be a rather good year in which to start a steamship line to California, since the Gold Rush started the next year. Howland & Aspinwall were also the recipients of a federal government subsidy to operate their trans-oceanic steamship line, against which they were forced to compete with the unsubsidized line owned by Cornelius Vanderbilt. The company's first vessel to make the trip was packed with passengers. Pacific Mail eventually became American President Lines, which is now part of Neptune Orient Lines.

== Personal life ==
In 1818, Howland was married to Joanna Esther Hone (1799–1848), the daughter of John Hone. Joanna was a niece of Philip Hone, the noted diarist and mayor of New York City. Together, Joanna and Samuel were the parents of:

- Joanna Hone Howland (1820–1842), who married George Buckman Dorr (1806–1875), son of Boston Selectmen Samuel Dorr, in 1837.
- Caroline Howland (1821–1863), who married merchant and banker Charles Handy Russell, cousin of U.S. Representative Jonathan Russell and U.S. Minister at Stockholm, in 1850.
- Louisa Howland (1826–1897), who married Hamilton Hoppin (1821–1885), uncle of architects Howard and Francis L. V. Hoppin, in 1849.
- Mary Ann Howland (1830–1855), who married Alexander Van Rensselaer, a younger son of Stephen Van Rensselaer, in 1851. After her death, Alexander married Louisa Barnewell.
- Emily Aspinwall Howland (1832–1897), who married Henry Chauncey Jr. (1825–1897) in 1853.
- Joseph Howland (1834–1886), a Union Army officer who became New York State Treasurer; he married Eliza Newton Woolsey in 1855.
- Catherine Clinton Howland (1841–1880), who married architect Richard Morris Hunt in 1861.

Howland died in Rome on February 9, 1853. At his death, he left an estate valued in excess of $11,000,000 that included stock in the New York Steam Sugar Refining Company, a gas company in New Orleans and an Alabama bank. To each of his six children (that survived him), five daughters and one son, Howland left a quarter of a million dollars.
