= Isaac Roosevelt =

Isaac Roosevelt may refer to:

- Isaac Roosevelt (politician) (1726–1794), New York City revolutionary and politician
- Isaac Roosevelt (businessman) (1790–1863), merchant, grandson of the politician
