= William Henry Aspinwall =

American businessman

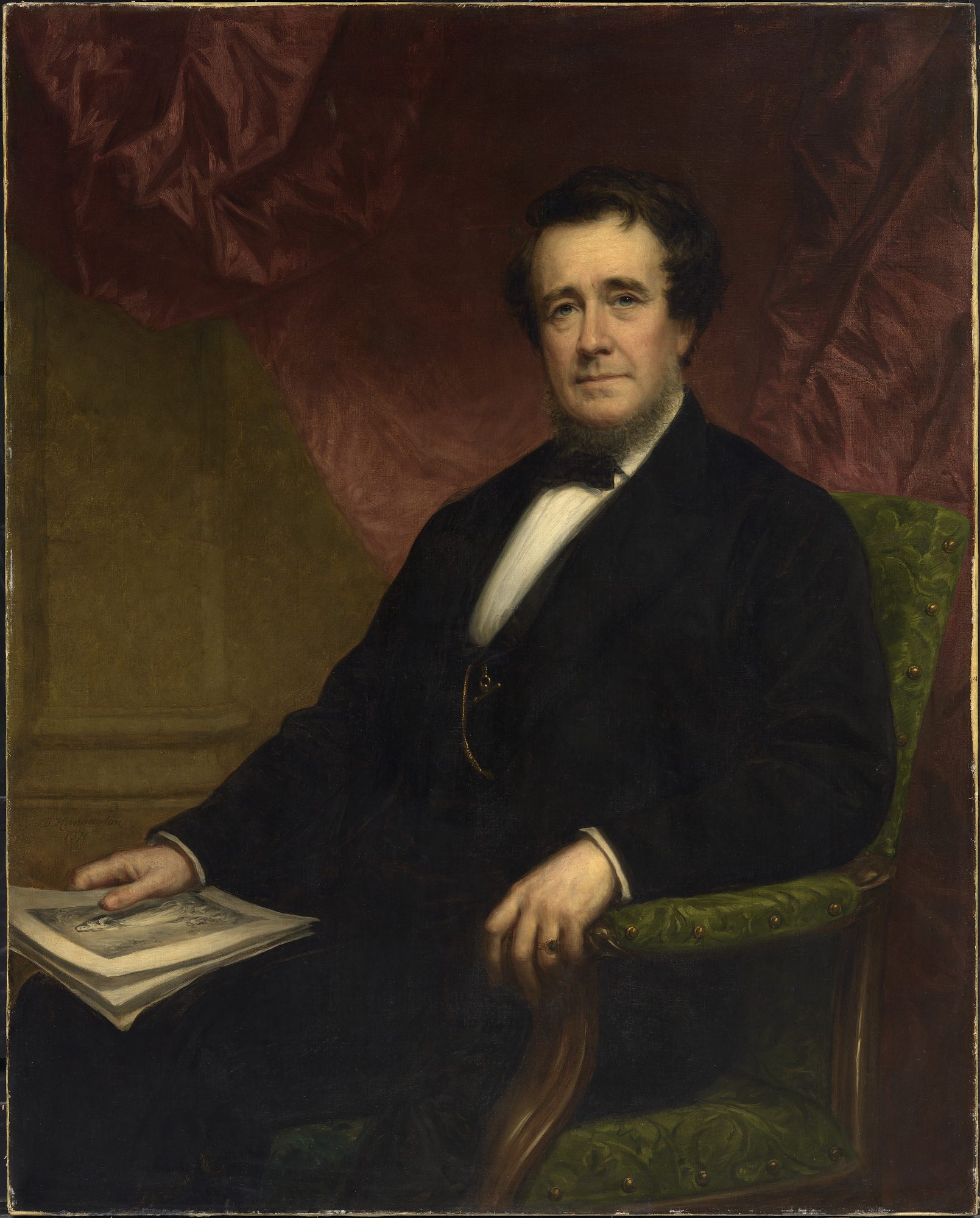
- Portrait of William Henry Aspinwall, by Daniel Huntington, 1871
- Born: December 16, 1807; Manhattan, New York, U.S.
- Died: January 18, 1875 (aged 67); Manhattan, New York, U.S.
- Resting place: Green-Wood Cemetery
- Occupation: Shipping magnate
- Organization(s): Howland & Aspinwall; Pacific Mail Steamship Company; Panama Canal Railway
- Spouse: Anna Lloyd Breck (m. 1830)
- Children: Lloyd Aspinwall
- Parent(s): John Aspinwall; Susan Howland
- Relatives: Henry Titus Aspinwall (great-grandson)

William Henry Aspinwall (December 16, 1807 – January 18, 1875) was a prominent American businessman who was a partner in the merchant firm of Howland & Aspinwall and was a co-founder of both the Pacific Mail Steamship Company and Panama Canal Railway companies which revolutionized the migration of goods and people to the Western coast of the United States.

Aspinwall was descended from, and related to, many prominent American families including the Roosevelts, Howlands, and Aspinwalls, that were heavily involved in the merchant trade business and politics, wielding vast power and ensuring wealth for generations.

== Early life ==
William Henry Aspinwall was born on December 16, 1807, in Manhattan, New York. He was the third of seven children born to John Aspinwall (1774–1847) and Susan Howland (1779–1852). His father, who traveled extensively, was associated with the dry goods merchant firm of Gilbert & Aspinwall. His younger sister, Mary Rebecca Aspinwall (1809–1886) was married to Isaac Roosevelt, the grandfather of U.S. President Franklin D. Roosevelt. His maternal aunt, Harriet Howland, was the third wife of Isaac's father, New York State Assemblyman James Roosevelt.

His maternal grandparents were Joseph and Lydia Howland. The Howland family was descended from John Howland, a signer of the Mayflower Compact. His cousin, Emily Aspinwall Howland, daughter of Samuel Shaw Howland, was married to Henry Chauncey, the son of Henry Chauncey, Esq., of Alsop & Chauncey in Valparaíso, and Lucy Wetmore Alsop, the grandniece of Continental Congressman John Alsop.

His paternal grandfather, Captain John Aspinwall, was one of the most prominent shipmasters of the New York merchant marine before the American Revolutionary War. He was a member of the Aspinwall family who were well known in New York society and were descended from William Aspinwall, who was among the first settlers of New England. Another relation, Sir Algernon Aspinall, served as vice president and secretary of the West India Committee for forty years.

== Career ==
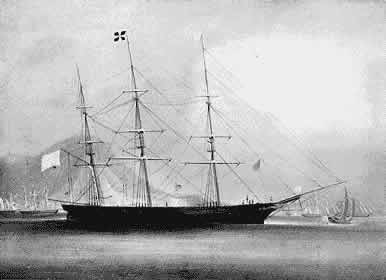
The Sea Witch

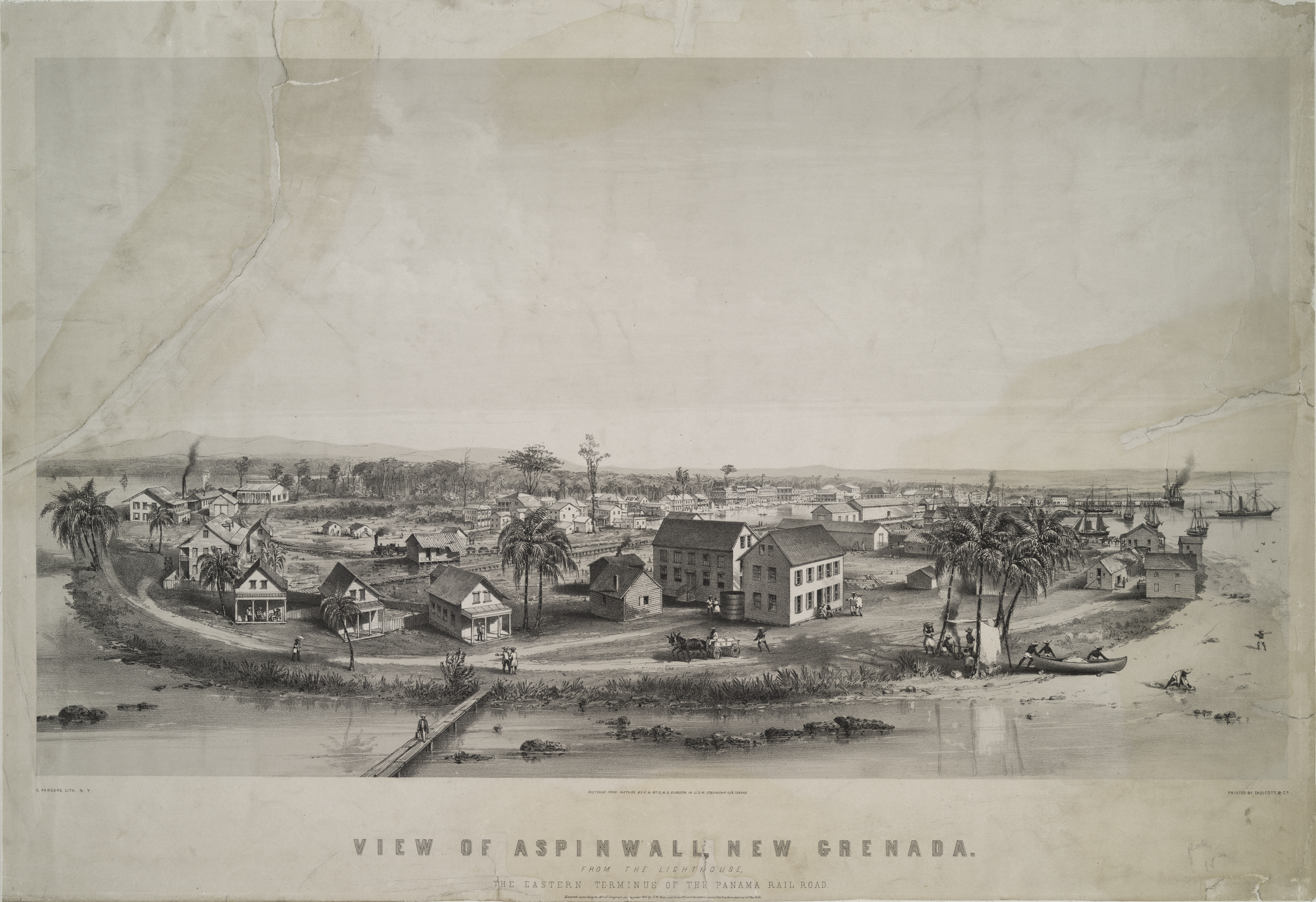
View of Aspinwall, Panama, 1855

After obtaining a "substantial education" at local private schools, Aspinwall began working as a clerk for G.G. & S.S. Howland, a merchant firm founded brothers Gardiner Greene Howland and Samuel Shaw Howland, who were younger siblings of Aspinwall's mother Susan, a position he held until 1832. The firm imported high-status goods such as porcelain, silk, tea, and opium from China, and sold them to Americans of means.

=== Howland & Aspinwall ===
In 1832, he became a partner in Howland & Aspinwall, along with his cousin William Edgar Howland, the son of founder Gardiner Howland. After assuming the presidency in 1835, he expanded trade to South America, China, Europe, the Mediterranean, and the East and West Indies. Howland & Aspinwall owned some of the most famous clipper ships ever built. In 1845, while the firm owned the Ann McKim which was regarded as the fastest ship afloat, it built the Rainbow, which was even faster. The Rainbow was the high-tech racehorse of its day, and is considered to be the first of the extreme clippers. Instead of the bluff bow that was customary on ships up until that time, the Rainbow had a sharp bow, prompting on-lookers to joke that maybe she would sail better backwards. The next year, Howland & Aspinwall had the Sea Witch built, which set a speed record from China to New York which stood until 2013.

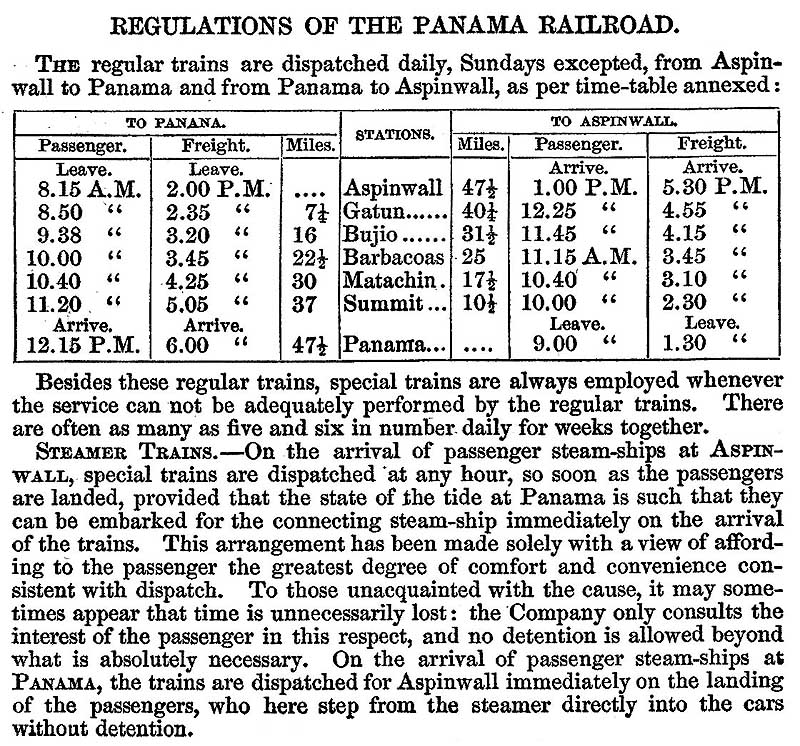
Panama Railroad schedule

Clipper ships sacrificed cargo capacity for speed, but in some markets, the fast service allowed their owners to charge premium rates (Tea from China tasted better if it was fresh, so the cargo on the first ship of the season to arrive in New York was worth more). Also faster speed meant that the vessel could complete more voyages in a given time period, which also helped make up for the diminished cargo capacity. The firm and its profits made Aspinwall very wealthy, reportedly one of the richest men on the East Coast in the nineteenth century.

=== Pacific Mail Steamship Company ===
In 1840s, William's younger brother John Lloyd Aspinwall succeeded him as president of Howland & Aspinwall so he could devote his time to transportation around the Isthmus of Panama. In 1848, Aspinwall, along with Gardiner G. Howland and Henry Chauncey, founded the Pacific Mail Steamship Company, to provide service to California. This turned out to be a rather good year in which to start a steamship line to California, since the Gold Rush started the next year. Howland & Aspinwall were also the recipients of a federal government subsidy to operate their trans-oceanic steamship line, against which they were forced to compete with the unsubsidized line owned by Cornelius Vanderbilt. The company's first vessel to make the trip was packed with passengers. Pacific Mail eventually became American President Lines, which is now part of Neptune Orient Lines.

=== Panama Canal Railway ===
Following the Steamship Company, Aspinwall then promoted a railway in Panama. The project, which began in May 1850 and was later known as the Panama Canal Railway, was the first transcontinental railroad in the Americas and was built to provide a shorter and more secure path between the United States' East and West Coasts. When completed in 1855, the line was designated as an "inter-oceanic" railroad crossing as it connected ports on the Atlantic and Pacific Oceans. The tropical rain forest terrain and outbreak of malaria and cholera, rendered its five-year construction, at a cost of $8,000,000, a considerable engineering challenge, and required more than seven thousand workers drawn from "every quarter of the globe."

=== Later life and Civil War involvement ===
Aspinwall retired in 1856, but remained active as a philanthropist and spent considerable time improving his country estate near Tarrytown, New York, which was later sold by his son to William Rockefeller, brother of John D. Rockefeller, for $150,000 in 1886 and became part of Pocantico Hills, New York. He was elected as a fellow of the American Society of Civil Engineers on July 9, 1870.

Although he never held office, Aspinwall, an admirer of George B. McClellan, was a participant at the "ill-fated" Peace Conference of 1861 in Washington. Later, after the outbreak of the American Civil War, Aspinwall and John Murray Forbes were sent by the Secretary of the Navy, Gideon Welles, on a secret mission to England to obtain their "interference in the building and outfitting of iron-clads then in course of construction by Messrs. Laird" intended for the Confederate States Navy. They were sent with millions of dollars in U.S. Bonds from the U.S. Treasury. While Forbes and Aspinwall did not persuade the British to buy the ships, their interference forced the British to detain the ships and conduct a lengthy investigation, essentially cutting off the supply of ships to the Confederate Navy.

In 1866, he was a founder of the American Society for the Prevention of Cruelty to Animals, and of the Metropolitan Museum of Art, in 1869. He owned works by Bartolomé Esteban Murillo, Antonio da Correggio, Diego Velázquez, Bartholomeus van der Helst, Teniers, Peter Paul Rubens, Philips Wouwerman, Cuyp, Ary Scheffer, Gerard, Dow, Nicolaes Pieterszoon Berchem, Titian, Adriaen Brouwer, Gerard ter Borch, Paul Veronese, Mieris, and Leonardo da Vinci, Romney, Jean-Baptiste Greuze, and Jean-Baptiste Madou.

== Personal life ==
In 1830, Aspinwall was married to Anna Lloyd Breck (1812–1885). She was the daughter of Catherine Douce (née Israel) Breck (1789–1864) and George Breck (1784–1869), the brother of U.S. Representatives Samuel Breck and Daniel Breck. Anna was the sister of Rev. James Lloyd Breck, an Episcopal missionary, and Jane Breck, who married Aspinwall's brother John. Together, William and Anna were the parents of:

- Anna Lloyd Aspinwall (1831–1880), who in 1850 married architect James Renwick Jr. (1818–1895), the son of Margaret Brevoort and James Renwick, an engineer, architect, and professor at Columbia College.
- Lloyd Aspinwall (1834–1886), who married Harriette Prescott D'Wolf (d. 1888), granddaughter of James DeWolf.
- Rev. John Abel Aspinwall (1840–1913), who married Julia Titus (1841–1876). After her death, he married Bessie Mary Reed (1843–1915)
- Louisa Aspinwall (1843–1913), who married John Wendell Minturn (1839–1881), the son of merchant Robert Bowne Minturn
- Katharine Aspinwall (1847–1924), who married Ambrose Cornelius Kingsland (1835–1890), the son of New York Mayor Ambrose Kingsland.

William Henry Aspinwall died of a myocardial infarction on January 18, 1875, in Manhattan. He was buried at Green-Wood Cemetery in Brooklyn, New York.

Furthermore, William Henry Aspinwall's great-grandson was New York-based architect Henry Titus Aspinwall (1895–1979).

=== Legacy ===
The town of Aspinwall, Panama (now Colón), founded in 1850 and named after Aspinwall, on the 650 acres (2.6 km^{2}) on the western end of a treacherously marshy islet covered with mangrove trees, known as Manzanillo Island.

== See also ==
- Howland & Aspinwall
