= Isaac Roosevelt House =

Historic house in New York, United States

- U.S. National Register of Historic Places
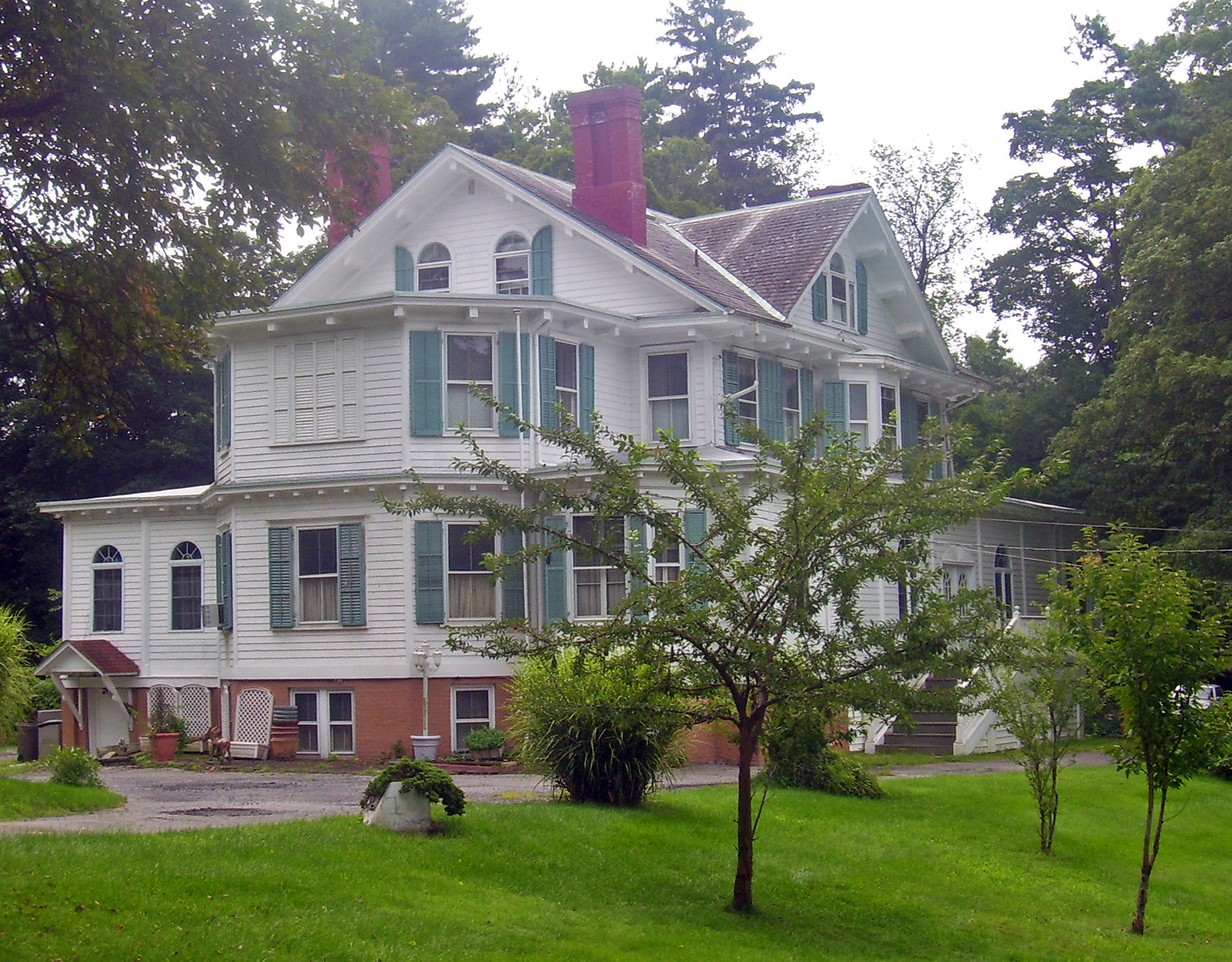
- West (front) elevation and north profile, 2008

- Location within New York Location within the United States
- Interactive map showing the location of Isaac Roosevelt House
- Location: Hyde Park, New York
- Nearest city: Poughkeepsie
- Coordinates: 41°44′16″N 73°55′55″W
- Area: 1.9 acres (7,700 m^{2})
- Built: 1832
- Architectural style: Federal, Italianate
- NRHP reference No.: 93000857
- Added to NRHP: 1993

The Isaac Roosevelt House is located on Riverview Circle in Hyde Park, New York, United States. It was the main house of Isaac Roosevelt's Rosedale estate on the Hudson River. His grandson, future United States president Franklin Roosevelt, spent a lot of time there as a child when it was the home of his uncle John.

It was built in a late application of the Federal style, with some later Italianate touches added. In 1993 it was added to the National Register of Historic Places.

== Building ==
The house sits on a 1.9-acre (7,700 m^{2}) lot on the east side of Riverview Circle, near the top of a small rise less than a mile inland from the river, visible from the house over the trees in the neighborhood. It is a two-story, five-bay clapboard-sided frame house on an exposed brick foundation. The rectangular main block has a two-story north wing, a one-story south wing, and a one-story projecting bay on the west (front) facade.

Its cross-gabled roof, pierced by four chimneys, has large overhanging eaves with exposed rafters and a plain cornice supported by wooden brackets. The same treatment is found on the wing roofs as well. At the ends of the gables are round-arched windows with louvered shutters. The recessed main entrance contains a glazed wooden double French door with a molded surround and elliptical transom. All the windows on the first floor have a small cornice and shutters. A one-story flat-roofed porch wraps around the front and both sides, supported by chamfered posts.

Above the entrance on the second story is a projecting bay window. It has a flat roof with the same roof treatment as the main roof. The flanking windows are similar to their first-story counterparts. The front facade is topped with a Palladian window and shutters at the attic level.

The south wing has a one-story octagonal enclosed porch. The eastern (rear) facade also has a porch similar to the one on the front. The north wing has a flat-roofed projecting bay of its own at the northwest corner, and a porticoed entrance to the basement at the northeast corner.

The interior retains the Federal-style center-hall plan. The adjoining rooms on either side have many of their original features such as woodwork, hardware, and mantels.

== History ==
Isaac Roosevelt (1790–1863) purchased the land for his estate, in 1832, five years after his marriage. It was near his father James's estate, Mount Hope, most of which is now the grounds of the former Hudson River State Hospital. Isaac chose the name Rosedale for his own property.

After his death in 1863, his son John Aspinwall Roosevelt inherited the property. He made several renovations and additions to the house, including the front porch, and is most responsible for its present appearance. His nephew Franklin, the future president, spent much time at Rosedale as a child.

The property remained in the Roosevelt family until 1954, when Rosedale was subdivided to create the present suburban neighborhood around it. The house, a cottage and boathouse on the river are the only estate buildings that remain. There have been no major alterations to either.
