= Roosevelt Point Cottage and Boathouse =

Historic house in New York, United States

- U.S. National Register of Historic Places
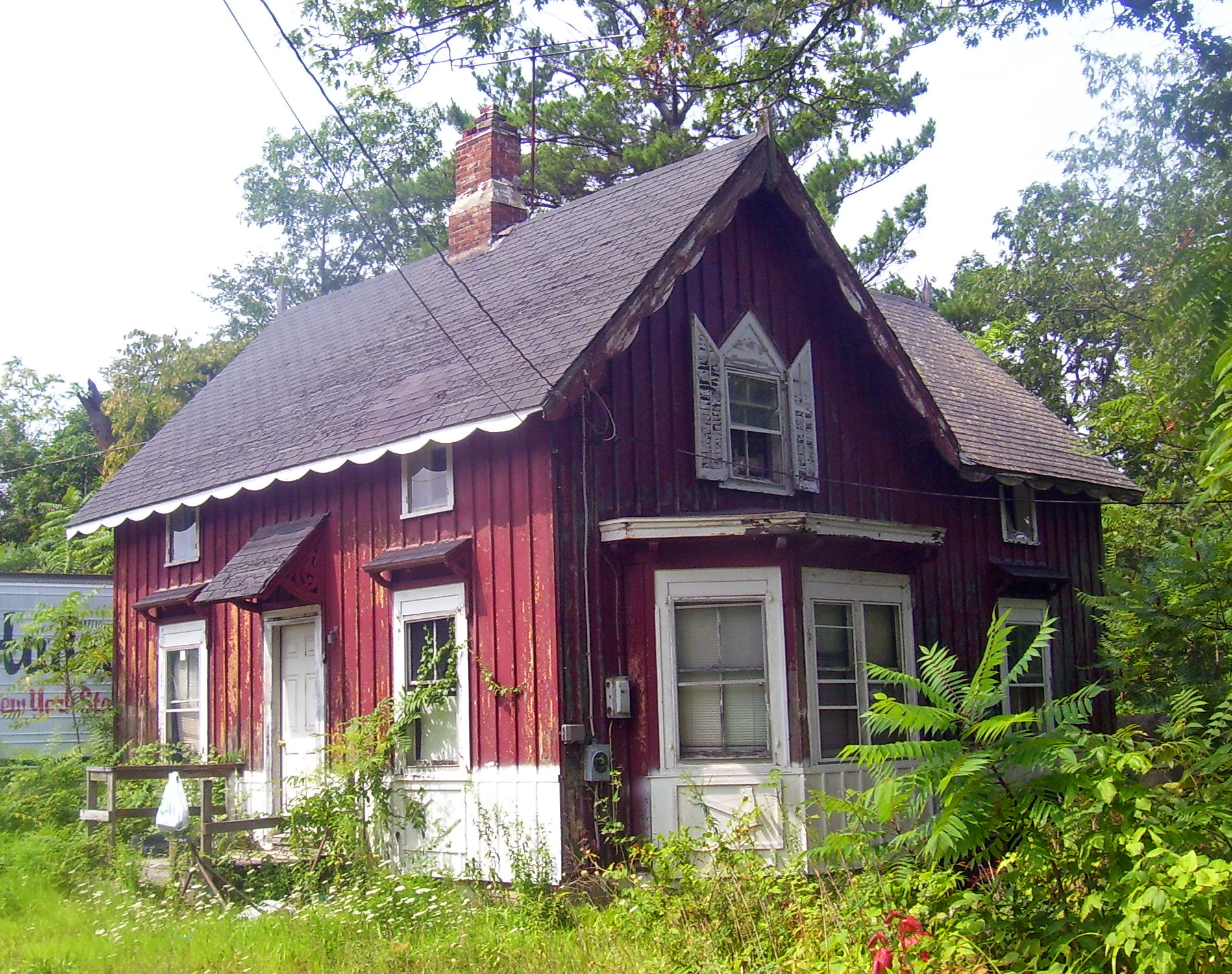
- West elevation and north profile of cottage, 2008

- Location within New York Location within the United States
- Location: Hyde Park, NY
- Coordinates: 41°44′23″N 73°56′11″W
- Area: 5 acres (2.0 ha)
- Built: ca. 1860
- Architectural style: Carpenter Gothic
- NRHP reference No.: 93000851
- Added to NRHP: September 2, 1993

The Roosevelt Point Cottage and Boathouse are located on the Hudson River near the end of River Point Road in Hyde Park, New York, United States. They were both built around 1860 as part of Rosedale, the estate of Isaac Roosevelt, grandfather of Franklin D. Roosevelt.

Roosevelt's son John, who inherited the estate, was a champion ice yachter. He stored his craft in the boathouse, and his crews would warm up in the cottage. In 1993 both properties were added to the National Register of Historic Places as a single listing.

== Property ==
The boathouse and cottage are located in a five-acre (2 ha) parcel between the tracks built as the Hudson River Railroad (now used by CSX and Amtrak's Empire Service) and the river itself. The Hyde Park Marina is located to the south. Most of the land is unpaved and open; truck trailers from a business to the north are stored around the property.

The cottage is visible from where River Point Road crosses the tracks. It is a one-and-a-half-story frame house on a stone and brick foundation with board-and-batten siding, three bays wide at the front. Its steeply pitched gabled roof is shingled in asphalt, pierced by a central brick chimney and finials and cross-gabled in the west (rear) elevation.

Scalloped vergeboards decorate the gable ends, and the cornice is similarly trimmed. The centrally located front entrance, on the eastern facade, has a bracketed pent roof, and a wooden hood covers both windows, each flanked by louvered shutters. Inside much of the original finishing remains, such as the flooring, doors and woodwork.

The boathouse is a long frame building located to the north. It is sided in board-and-batten as well with a stone course at ground level on its northern elevation. It has a double-pitched slate roof with an open area in between to allow for ventilation. A metal vent pipe rises from the roof ridge at the south, with additional pipes coming out of the western wall.

Inside, the boathouse has been slightly renovated for use as an office, which required some new braces for the rafters. Besides that and the removal of the loft, the building remains intact.

== History ==
The cottage was built by 1860 to house tenants on the Rosedale estate. Records show that it was home to Rosedale's gardener later on, when Isaac's son John Aspinwall Roosevelt owned the property. He was an avid sportsman, and in the 1880s was a champion ice yachter at a time when the Hudson just north of Poughkeepsie and the river's salt front, where it freezes over in cold winters, was the center of the sport in the United States.

The boathouse was specially built to accommodate his yacht, the 68-foot (21 m) Icicle, now on display at the Franklin D. Roosevelt Presidential Library and Museum, also in Hyde Park. The boathouse's double-pitched roof recalls the gambrel roofs found on many Dutch Colonial homes in the area. Sails were stored in the loft, no longer extant.

John Roosevelt's crews would warm up between and after races in the cottage's front room. His nephew Franklin spent much time at Rosedale as a boy, and as a young man competed in ice races himself, storing his own yacht in the boathouse.

The estate remained in the Roosevelt family's hands until the mid-1950s, when it was subdivided to create the suburban-style residential neighborhood to the south of River Point Road. The main house, boathouse and cottage are the only remaining buildings from Rosedale.
