= Howland Cultural Center =

- Howland Library
- U.S. National Register of Historic Places
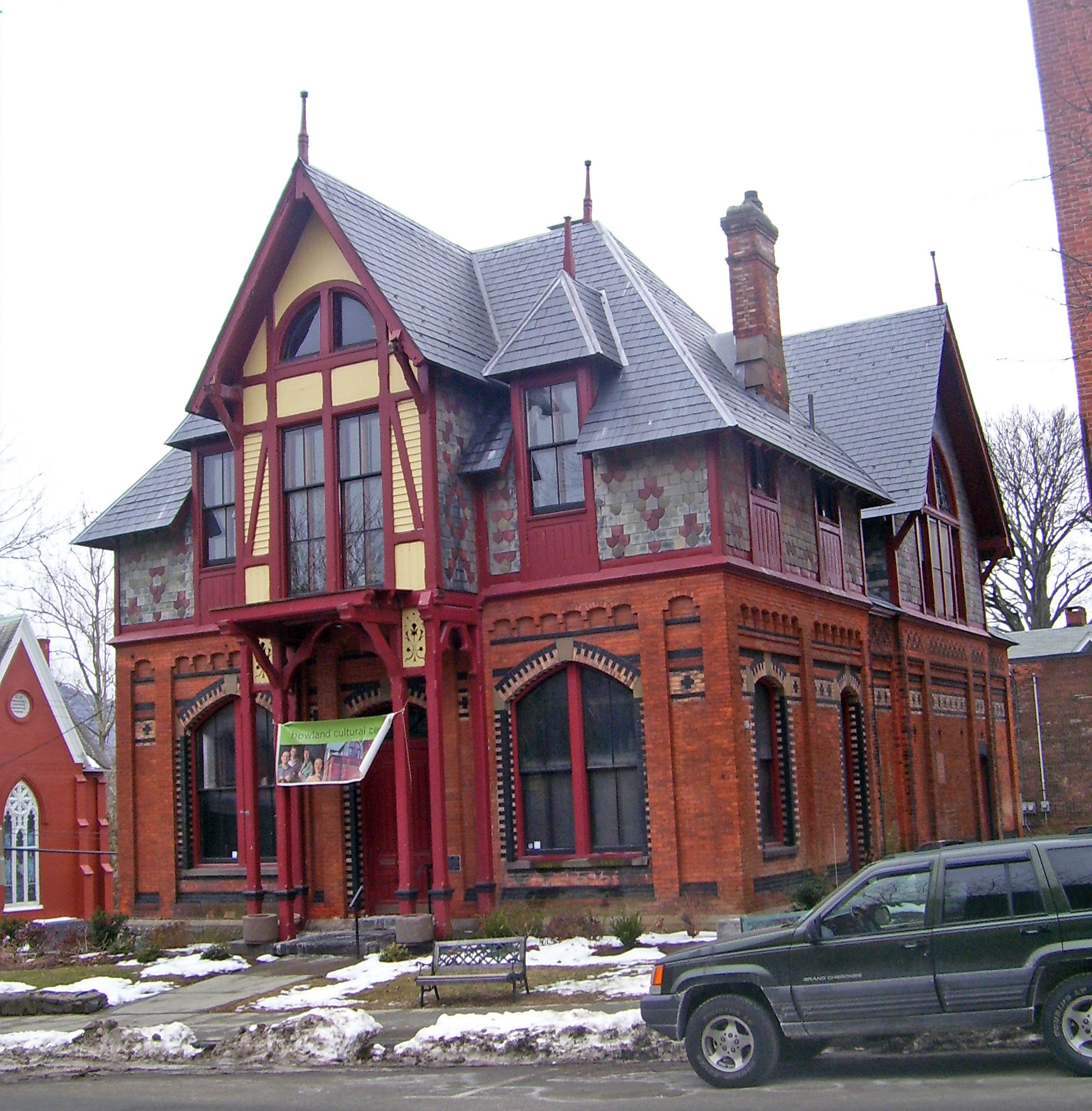
- North (front) elevation and west profile, 2009

- Location within New York Location within the United States
- Interactive map showing the location of Howland Library
- Location: Beacon, NY
- Coordinates: 41°30′6″N 73°57′53″W
- Built: 1871-72
- Architect: Richard Morris Hunt
- Architectural style: Stick Style, High Victorian Gothic
- NRHP reference No.: 73001180
- Added to NRHP: 1973

The Howland Cultural Center, formerly known as Howland Library, is located on Main Street (New York State Route 52 Business) in Beacon, New York, United States. It is an ornate brick building designed by Richard Morris Hunt in the 1870s. In 1973 it was listed on the National Register of Historic Places.

Hunt was commissioned by his brother-in-law, Joseph Howland, to design a home for a subscription library he donated to the city. The completed building has much in common with the Stick style summer homes in Newport, Rhode Island, that Hunt designed at this early stage of his career. Some of its design elements have been compared to Norwegian vernacular architecture. The interior was not complete in its current form until almost the end of the century. Except for some upgrades to its utilities, it has remained largely intact since then.

Throughout the 1920s it was one of only two remaining public subscription libraries in the state. In response to a donor's bequest, the library became free at the end of that decade. Almost 50 years later, the library moved out when it outgrew the building. Since then it has been used as a cultural center, hosting various visual and performing arts events.

== Building ==
The building is located at the east end of downtown Beacon, at the corner of Main Street and Tioronda Avenue, just west of where Churchill Street forks off to cross Fishkill Creek. The blocks to the west and north are urban and densely developed with larger mixed-use buildings, on the south side of the street. A large church is just across Tioronda from the Howland.

To the south, across Van Nydeck Avenue, is a mostly wooded area with a few houses. The Madam Brett Homestead, a 1709 stone house also listed on the Register, is near the west end of the block. Another listed building, Beacon's post office, is a block and a half west along Main Street.

=== Exterior ===
The building itself is a two-story three-by-five-bay brick structure on a foundation of bluestone and granite quarried at nearby Breakneck Ridge. Its first story is faced in brick; the second in polychrome fishscale shingles. Atop is a six-gabled roof covered in Delaware slate pierced by a brick chimney on the west side.

On the first story the foundation is capped with a granite water table. The east (front) face has arched double two-over-two double-hung sash windows and central main entrance are set in slightly recessed arched panels trimmed with patterns of black and buff brick. The tops of the panels are corbelled. Narrow side panels between the window panels and corners have a simple cross design in black and buff brick corresponding to the top of the window arches.

Six wooden pillars flanking the main entrance support a projecting bay on the second story, with a small hood sheltering the entrance steps. The second story as a whole is set off from the lower level by another water table. Its windows are narrow, tall two-over-two double-hung sash above fluted panels. They extend above the roofline, where they are topped with hipped roofs giving them the appearance of dormers. Wood painted red trims the shingles.

The central window has tall, narrow, two-over-four double-hung sash. Its face has a half-timbered appearance, although the section on either side of the windows is faced in clapboard rather than stucco. Above it is a two-paned semicircular lunette window. The bay is topped with a steeply pitched gabled roof and finial.

On the side elevations, there are two two-over-two double-hung sash windows in the east bays with a similar treatment as the front windows. Two gables pierce the south face. The smaller one on the north has two-over-two double-hung sash with another half-timbered face in the gable. Its larger counterpart on the south has a large paired window of one-over-one double-hung sash with smaller flanking windows. Above it is a tympanum set with intricate tracery. A similar window is located opposite; it has no smaller window closer to the east.

=== Interior ===
The interior of the building is a large open space. Floors are of English cane felt overlaid with hemlock, to dampen sound, and topped with strips of Georgia pine. A second-story gallery with a wrought iron railing is supported by carved wooden pillars and wrought iron brackets. Bookshelves are built into the walls and the dado is paneled. Handwrought Georgia pine pillars and hammerbeams support a 33-foot-9-inch (10.29 m) ceiling. Doors are carved to look like books with pages rising from the middle when closed.

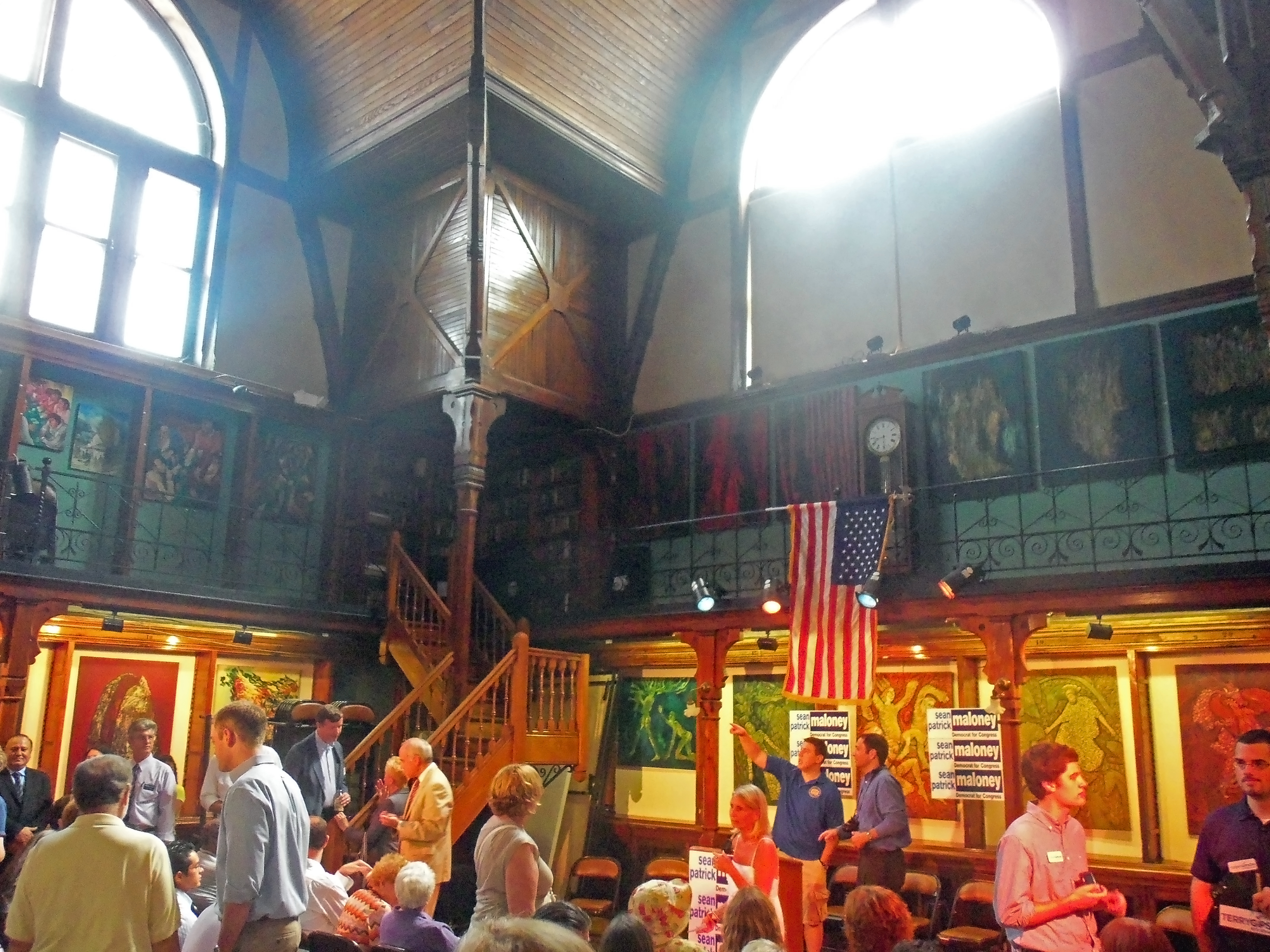
Interior prior to a 2012 campaign rally for Sean Patrick Maloney

Other rooms include a small entryway on the first floor and two small offices. On the second floor are three small rooms. They were originally the librarian's apartment, but are now also used as offices.

== History ==
Joseph Howland, a Civil War general and former New York State Treasurer whose Tioronda estate was a mile (1.6 km) south of the building's location in what was then the village of Matteawan, commissioned the building from his brother-in-law, Richard Morris Hunt, late in 1871. At the beginning of the next year, a general meeting was held for all those interested in establishing a subscription library. By August the building was complete, and the library opened with a formal ceremony at which Howland transferred the building to the library's board of trustees.

Hunt's building followed contemporary architectural styles similar to those of the cottages he was building for wealthy vacationers in Newport, Rhode Island. It most clearly reflects the polychrome and Picturesque modes. The woodwork around the main entrance also shows hints of the emerging Stick style; there was one more at the gables, but it has been lost. In 1940, a Federal Writers' Project guidebook would describe it as "in the Norwegian chalet style".

It was one of the last libraries to use natural light for its reading room. The original 2,200-volume collection grew quickly, as did the membership. In 1887 electric lighting replaced the original gas lamps. Seven years later, more space was needed, and the upper gallery was added, the last significant change to the building. Some alterations have also been made to the heating system over the years.

Even after the village of Matteawan, where it was located, merged with nearby Fishkill Landing at the beginning of the 20th century to become today's city of Beacon, the library remained subscribers-only. In the late 1920s, when it was one of only two such libraries remaining in the state, a wealthy local resident made a bequest to the library on the condition that it become a free public library. That began in 1929, essentially making it the city's library.

In 1942, Nancy Lamont, the second librarian, left the position. She and her predecessor had served a combined 70 years. The library continued to serve the city and its residents from the building until the 1970s, when the growth of the former outpaced the capacity of the latter. In 1976 the library moved to a vacant department store building two blocks west along Main, where it has remained, still called the Howland Library.

After the library moved out, the Howland Cultural Center was established to keep the building in use and preserve it. It hosts a variety of visual and performing arts events, as well as public and community meetings. It rents out the building for some events, mostly similar to those it stages itself but also including small weddings.

In 2007, the center installed geothermal heating to cut its energy costs and reduce the use of fossil fuels. A system using water in vertical pipes to be dug 250 feet (76 m) into the earth beneath the center will both heat and cool the building. It heats the building with up 70% more efficiency and cools up to 40% more efficiently. In addition it is quieter, enhancing the building's acoustics.

== See also ==
- National Register of Historic Places listings in Dutchess County, New York
