= Hoffman family =

Family

Hoffman
- Arms of the Hoffman family
- Current region: United States East Coast
- Origin: Reval, then in Swedish Estonia

The Hoffman family of New York is a prominent Baltic German family whose ancestor Martin Hoffman was born in Reval (now Tallinn), then the capital of Swedish Estonia. He emigrated to the Dutch colony of New Netherland in 1657. Among his descendants were Governor of New York John T. Hoffman, Congressman Ogden Hoffman, New York Attorney General Josiah Ogden Hoffman, State Senator Anthony Hoffman, and several clergymen of the Dutch Reformed Church. More contemporary descendants of this lineage include actor Philip Seymour Hoffman and President Franklin D. Roosevelt.

== Family tree ==
Martinus Hoffman (1625 – 1712)	Emmerentje de Witte (1625 – ?)
Zecharias Hoffman (c.1675–1744)	Hester Bruyn (born 1683)	Nicolaes Hoffman (1680–1750)	Jannetje Crispell (1686–1752)
Zechariah Hoffman married Maria Terwilliger (born 1720)	Jacobus Hoffman (born 1720) married Margaret Lefeber	Martin Hoffman (born 1706/7) married (1) Tryntje Benson (1712–1765), (2) Alida (Livingston) Hansen	Anthony Hoffman (1711–1784) married Catherine Van Gaasbeck (1718–1785)	Zecharias Hoffman (born 1713) married (1) Helena Van Wyck, (2) Letitia (Brinckerhoff) Van Wyck	Peter Hoffman (born 1727) married Cathariena Van Alstyne
Zara Hoffman (1745–1823) married Cornelius C. Schoonmaker (1745–1790), Congressman 1791–93, NY Assemblyman 1777–90 and 1795	Cornelia Hoffman (1734–1780) married Isaac Roosevelt (1726–1794), State Senator 1777–86 and 1789–92	Nicholas Hoffman (1736–1800) married Sarah Ogden	Anthony Hoffman (1739–1790); NY Assemblyman 1777–79 and 1784, State Senator 1788–90	Maria Hoffman (1743–1825) married Archibald Laidlie D.D. (1727–1779)	Peter Livingston Hoffman (1767–1807), married Helena Kissam
Mary Colden (1770–1797), sister of Cadwallader D. Colden, (1769–1834), Mayor of New York 1818–21, Congressman 1821–23, State Senator 1825–27	Josiah Ogden Hoffman (1766–1837), NY Attorney General 1795–1802	Maria Fenno (1781–1823), daughter of John Fenno (1751–1798), newspaper publisher	Adrian Kissam Hoffman (1797–1871), physician, married Jane Ann Thompson (1801–1876)
Ogden Hoffman (1794–1856), Congressman 1837–41, NY Attorney General 1854–55	Mary Colden Hoffman (1796–1818), married Philip Rhinelander (1788–1830)	Charles Fenno Hoffman (1806–1884), poet	John T. Hoffman (1828–1888), Mayor of New York 1866–68, Governor of New York 1869–72
Ogden Hoffman, Jr. (1822–1891); U.S. District Court Justice in California 1851–91	Mary Colden Rhinelander (1818–1894), married John A. King (1817–1900), State Senator 1874–75
Alice King (1860–1920), married Gherardi Davis (1858–1941), Assemblyman 1899–1902
