= Tadd Roosevelt =

Nephew of Franklin Delano Roosevelt and John Jacob Astor IV

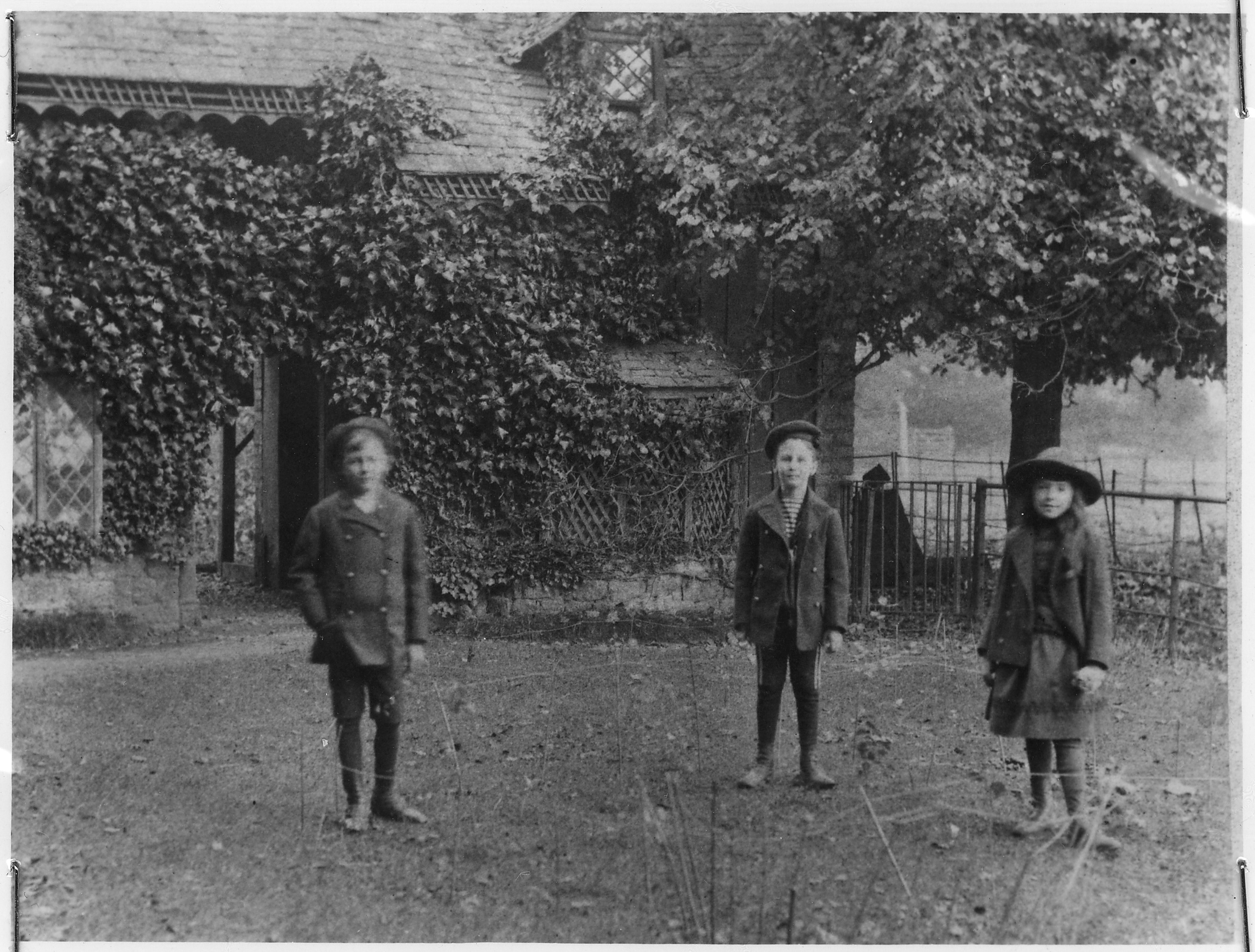
- Tadd (middle) in Bicester, England with sister Helen (right) and uncle Franklin (left) in January 1889
- Born: James Roosevelt Roosevelt Jr. August 20, 1879; New York City, New York, U.S.
- Died: June 7, 1958 (aged 78); New York City, New York, U.S.
- Education: Groton School
- Alma mater: Harvard University
- Parent(s): James Roosevelt Roosevelt; Helen Schermerhorn Astor
- Relatives: See Astor family and Roosevelt family

James Roosevelt "Tadd" Roosevelt Jr. (August 20, 1879 – June 7, 1958) was an American heir and member of the Roosevelt and Astor families.

== Early life ==
James Roosevelt Roosevelt Jr. was born on August 20, 1879. He was the son of diplomat James Roosevelt "Rosey" Roosevelt (1854–1927) of the Roosevelt family and Helen Schermerhorn (née Astor) Roosevelt (1855–1893) of the Astor family. He had one sister, Helen Rebecca Roosevelt (1881–1962).

Among his large and prominent family were uncles Franklin Delano Roosevelt (who was three years younger than Tadd), who later became President of the United States, and Colonel John Jacob "Jack" Astor IV, who died during the sinking of the RMS Titanic. Tadd's paternal grandparents were businessman James Roosevelt I and Rebecca Brien (née Howland) Roosevelt, while his maternal grandparents were businessman William Backhouse Astor Jr. and socialite Caroline (née Schermerhorn) Astor, who was known as the "Mrs. Astor".

He and Franklin both attended Groton School and Harvard University, with Tadd being ahead of Franklin. Their kinship led to Franklin often being mockingly referred to as "Uncle Frank" while the two attended Groton together.

== Career ==
Upon his mother's death in 1893, Tadd inherited $1,500,000 (equivalent to approximately $53,750,000 in 2025 dollars).

== Personal life ==
On June 14, 1900, while still a student at Harvard, Roosevelt married 19-year-old Sadie Messinger (c. 1880–1940) without the consent of his father Rosey. (In his biography on Franklin Roosevelt, Geoffrey C. Ward states that Messinger was "at least 25 years-old.") Upon learning of the wedding, Rosey traveled from Hyde Park and brought Tadd home. A frequent sight at the Haymarket Dance Hall, Sadie was known as "Dutch Sadie" and "Sadie of the Tenderloin." (Sadie is described in some accounts as a prostitute; Winston Groom described her as a "hooker and sometime dancehall girl.") Rosey unsuccessfully attempted to have the marriage annulled, and both the Roosevelt and Astor families viewed the union as disgraceful. Rosey ultimately disowned Tadd; after the public scandal, which was reported in newspapers at the time, the father had a heart attack, which FDR blamed on Tadd's marriage. In October 1900, FDR wrote to Sara Roosevelt, "One can never again consider him a true Roosevelt. It will be well for him not only to go to parts unknown, but to stay there and begin life anew."

In 1907, Tadd was arrested for speeding on Ocean Parkway in Brooklyn. He lived in Florida for a time. In February 1917, Tadd was again arrested in Florida, and a local court in Volusia County reportedly ordered him to stay in Florida "pending a settlement of a divorce suit." In 1911, he reportedly lived in Daytona under the name "M. S. King"; the New York Times reported in 1917 that the Roosevelt family had prevailed in achieving a separation, in which Sadie was to receive a $10,000 (equivalent to $251,299 in 2025 dollars) annual income. A court soon granted $625 (equivalent to $15,706 in 2025 dollars) per month alimony to Sadie, pending settlement of the divorce. At the time, Tadd was reported to be the Floridian paying the highest income taxes, having a $12,000,000 fortune (equivalent to $301,558,442 in 2025 dollars).

== Later years and death ==
By October 1921, Tadd and Sadie were reportedly no longer living together. However, they remained married until her death in 1940. Biographer Jean Edward Smith writes that Tadd and Sadie remained together until her death. They had no children.

After returning to New York, Tadd Roosevelt supported himself as an auto repairman. He reportedly did not use his large inheritance and was estranged from his family, communicating only to tell the Astor family that his money should be given to the Salvation Army upon his death.

Roosevelt died in Manhattan on June 7, 1958. A recluse in his later years, his fortune was donated to the Salvation Army, which received some $5 million.
