= Anthony Hoffman =

American politician

Anthony Hoffman (December 5, 1764 – ?) was an American politician from New York.

== Early life ==
He was born on April 14, 1766, the son of Col. Martinus Hoffman and Tryntje (Benson) Hoffman. He graduated from Kings College (now Columbia College).

His sister Cornelia Hoffman (1734–1780) was married to State Senator Isaac Roosevelt; his brother Nicholas Hoffman (1736–1800) was the father of New York Attorney General Josiah Ogden Hoffman (1766–1837); his sister Maria Hoffman (1743–1825) was married to Archibald Laidlie D.D. (1727–1779); and his half-brother Philip Livingston Hoffman (1767–1807) was the grandfather of Governor John T. Hoffman (1828–1888).

== Career ==
He owned large areas of real estate in Dutchess County, and lived in Red Hook. He became active in politics, first as a Patriot, and later as a Federalist.

He was a delegate to the 1st, 3rd and 4th New York Provincial Congresses, a delegate to the New York State Constitutional Convention of 1777; a member of the New York State Assembly (Dutchess Co.) in 1777–78 and 1778–79; Supervisor of the Town of Rhinebeck from 1781 to 1785; again a member of the State Assembly in 1784; a Regent of the University of the State of New York from 1784 to 1787; and a member of the New York State Senate (Middle D.) from 1788 until his death in 1790, sitting in the 11th, 12th and 13th New York State Legislatures.

== Personal life ==
He married Mary Rutgers (died 1815), and they had one daughter: Eliza (Hoffman) Rutgers.

He died between February 24 (the date of his will) and May 18 (the date the will was proved), 1790.

== Sources ==
- Genealogy of the Hoffman Family by Eugene Augustus Hoffman (Dodd, Mead & Co., NYC; pg. 151ff)
- The New York Civil List compiled by Franklin Benjamin Hough (pages 51, 113f, 142, 157f, 161, 281 and 335; Weed, Parsons and Co., 1858)
