= Joseph Howland =

Union United States Army general

- Born: December 3, 1834; New York City, New York
- Died: March 31, 1886 (aged 51); Menton, France
- Burial place: Menton, France
- Military career
- Allegiance: USA United States of America; Union
- Branch: Union Army
- Rank: Colonel; Brevet Brigadier General
- Commands: 16th New York Infantry Regiment
- Conflicts: American Civil War

Joseph Howland (December 3, 1834, in New York City – March 31, 1886, in Menton, Alpes-Maritimes, France) was a Union Army officer during the American Civil War, politician and philanthropist.

== Early life ==
Howland was born into a prominent merchant family that had grown rich in the Old China Trade. His first American ancestor, John Howland, was one of the Pilgrim Fathers and a signer of the 1620 Mayflower Compact, the governing document of what became Plymouth Colony. Howland's father was Samuel Shaw Howland, a partner in the shipping firm of Howland & Aspinwall; his mother was Joanna Esther Hone, the niece of Philip Hone, the noted diarist and mayor of New York City. The family lived at 12 Washington Square. The Howlands were a deeply religious family; at one time Howland considered entering the ministry, but gave up those plans due to ill health. This same ill health also prevented Howland from attending school and university; he was educated at home, with several years of European travel to round out his education. His mother died when Joseph was fourteen; his father when he was nineteen.

At the age of twenty-one, Howland married Eliza Newton Woolsey of New York, one of seven sisters well known as prominent reformers and anti-slavery activists. The couple honeymooned in Europe and the Holy Land. While touring Italy, the Howlands commissioned two marble busts of themselves from the Italian neo-classical sculptor, Giovanni Maria Benzoni; these busts stand today in the Howland Public Library in Beacon, New York. The couple returned to the United States of America in 1859. That same year Howland bought the Freeland farm along Fishkill Creek in the village of Matteawan, naming his new estate Tioronda. He commissioned architect Frederick Clarke Withers to design the main house on the estate, which later became the Craig House Sanitarium. Howland's great-uncle, Philip Hone, was a partner with Peter A. Schenck in establishing the first factory, a cotton mill, in Matteawan in 1814.

== Civil War ==
Howland's life as a country gentleman ended with the beginning of the American Civil War in 1861. Upon the outbreak of the war, Howland immediately joined the 16th New York Infantry Regiment, where he served as the regiment's adjutant. When the commander of the 16th New York received a promotion, Howland was the unanimous choice to replace him as colonel. Howland saw service in the First Battle of Bull Run in July 1861.

Howland's time as commander of the 16th New York was short-lived. On June 29, 1862, during the Battle of Gaines's Mill, one of the Seven Days Battles of the Peninsula Campaign, Howland was directing his men into their place in the line when a Confederate bullet struck him in the thigh. He refused to go back to the hospital, staying with his men until the end of the battle. The regiment's official report credits Howland with "…the most undaunted bravery and marked coolness…" as he stayed on his horse and rode up and down the line, giving orders and shouting encouragement to his men, "…unmindful of…the leaden hail…" through which he had to ride.

The official report also stated that Howland's wound "…will disable him for several weeks." In fact, the wound ended Howland's military career; the wound and the resulting fever dangerously undermined his health and made further active service impossible. He resigned as commander of the 16th New York and never served again in the field. Howland returned to duty during the New York City draft riots in 1863, placing himself at the disposal of the civil and military authorities as they tried to quell the largest municipal riots in American history. Howland quickly organized a regiment of civilian volunteers to help suppress the chaos, but after the emergency passed he returned to civilian life.

On January 13, 1866 President Andrew Johnson nominated Howland for appointment to the grade of brevet brigadier general of volunteers, to rank from March 13, 1865, for his courage at Gaines's Mill and the United States Senate confirmed the appointment on March 12, 1866.

== Post-war ==
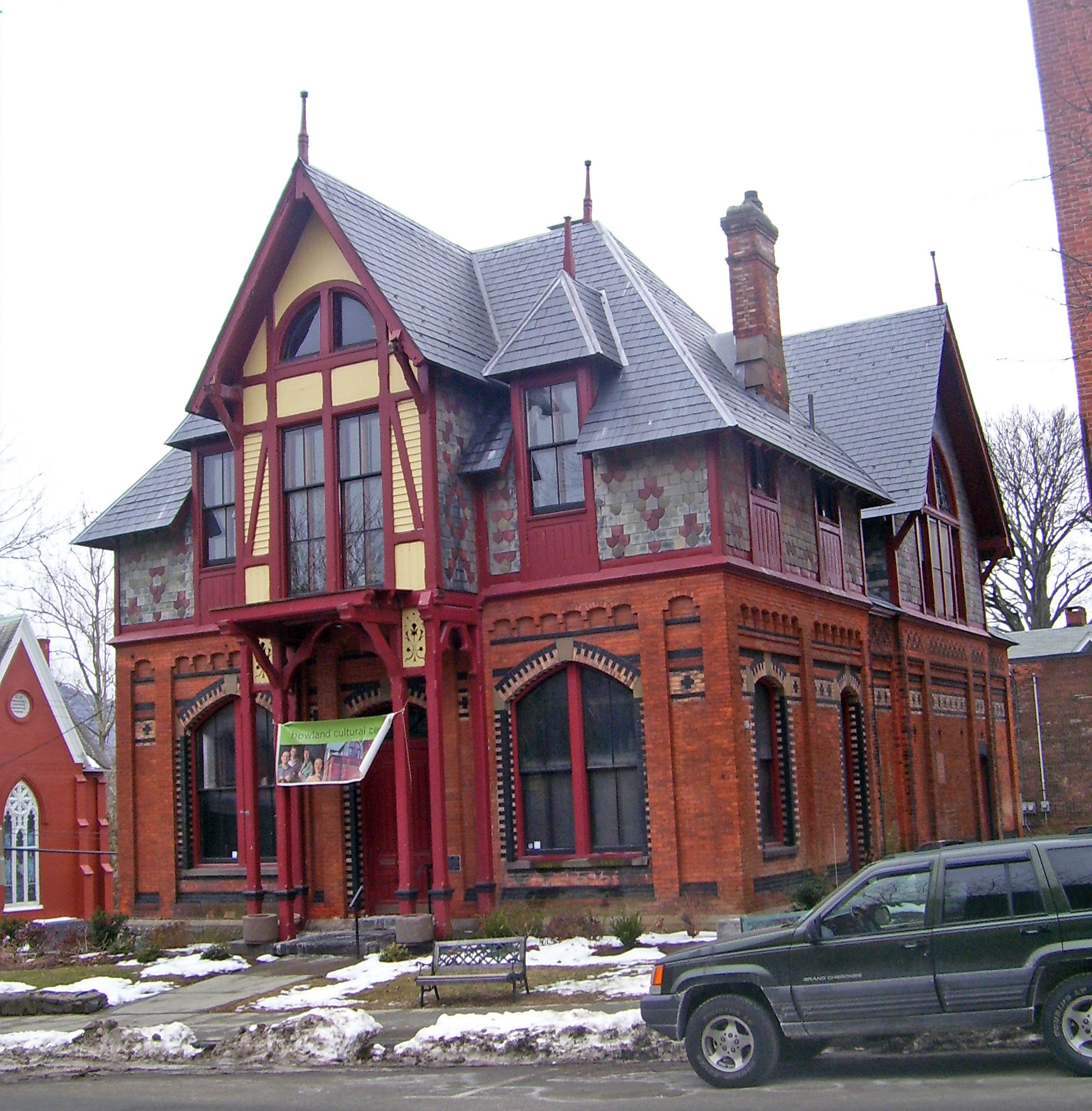
Howland Cultural Center, Beacon, NY

After the war, Howland was New York State Treasurer from 1866 to 1867, elected on the Republican ticket. He also had an active role in drafting the trust deeds for Cornell University and in organizing the Hudson River State Hospital for the Insane, the humane treatment of the mentally ill being one of his and his wife's great concerns. In Mattewan, Howland was instrumental in building the Presbyterian Church, and the public library that still bears his name. Howland commissioned his brother-in-law, the architect Richard Morris Hunt, to design the library building. The building is now the Howland Cultural Center and is now listed on the National Register of Historic Places. The library moved to another Main Street location in 1976. He also took an active part in the establishment of the National Bank at Fishkill-on-Hudson. Howland served as president of the Mechanics' Savings Bank of Fishkill-on-Hudson from March 24, 1866, to September 30, 1868.

Highland Hospital was established on May 1, 1871. Howland purchased the property, fitted it for a hospital and presented it to the town.

== Death ==
Howland died in Menton, France, on March 31, 1886, and was buried there. He and his wife had no children, and after his death, Eliza Howland never returned to Tioronda, saying that the memories of her husband made staying there too difficult. She died in Newport, Rhode Island, in 1917, at the age of eighty-two. After her death, Tioronda became Craig House, a hospital for the mentally ill.

The author Louis Stanton Auchincloss is his great-grandnephew.

== See also ==
- List of American Civil War brevet generals (Union)
- New York state election, 1865

== Notes ==
Political offices
Preceded by George W. Schuyler	New York State Treasurer; 1866–1867	Succeeded by Wheeler H. Bristol
