= James Roosevelt I =

American businessman (1828–1900)

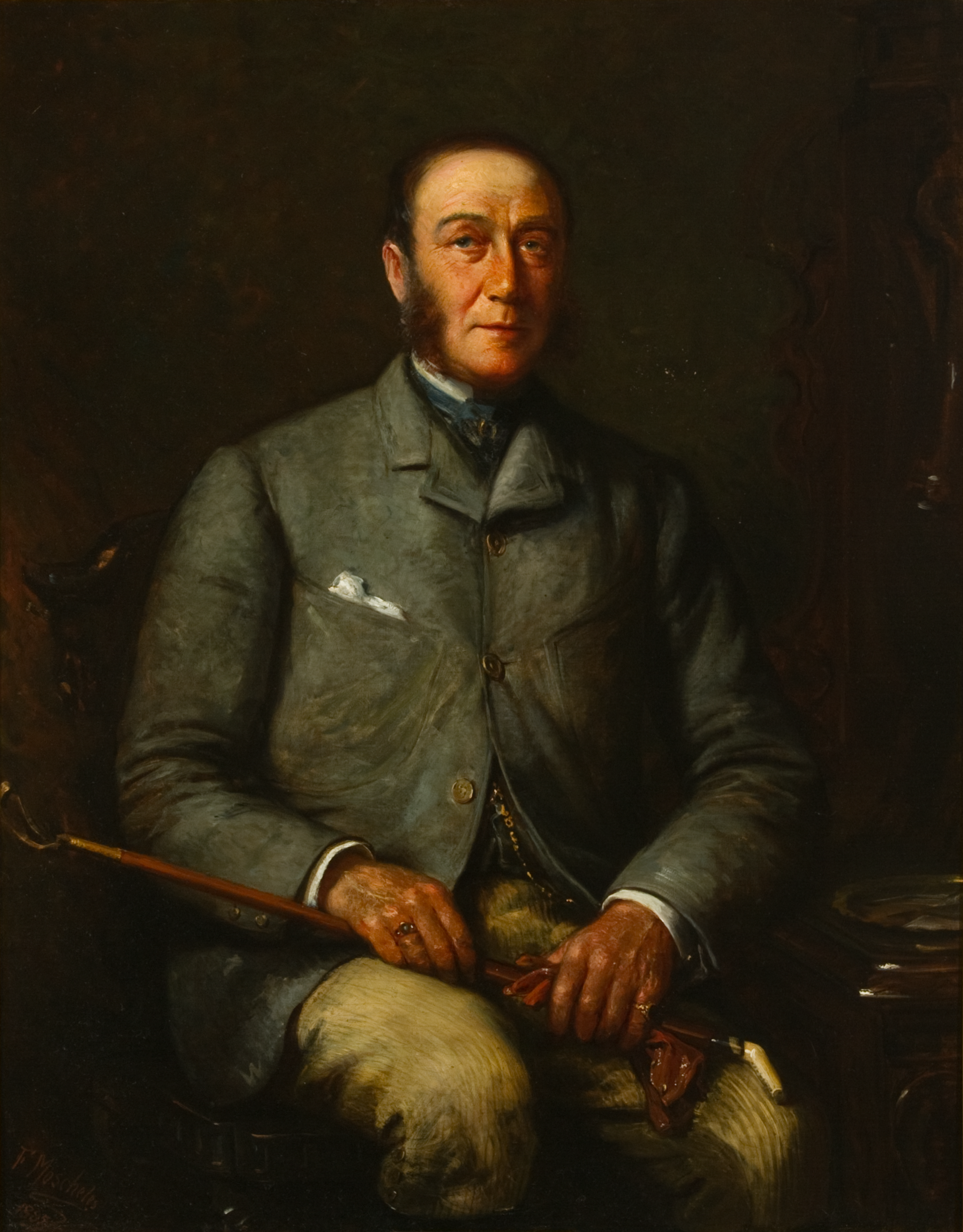
- 1885 portrait at Springwood in Hyde Park, New York
- Born: July 16, 1828; Hyde Park, New York, U.S.
- Died: December 8, 1900 (aged 72); New York City, New York, U.S.
- Education: Union College, Harvard University
- Occupation: Businessman
- Political party: Democratic
- Spouses: Rebecca Brien Howland (m. 1853; died 1876) Sara Ann Delano (m. 1880)
- Children: James; Franklin
- Parents: Isaac Daniel Roosevelt; Mary Rebecca Aspinwall
- Relatives: Roosevelt family

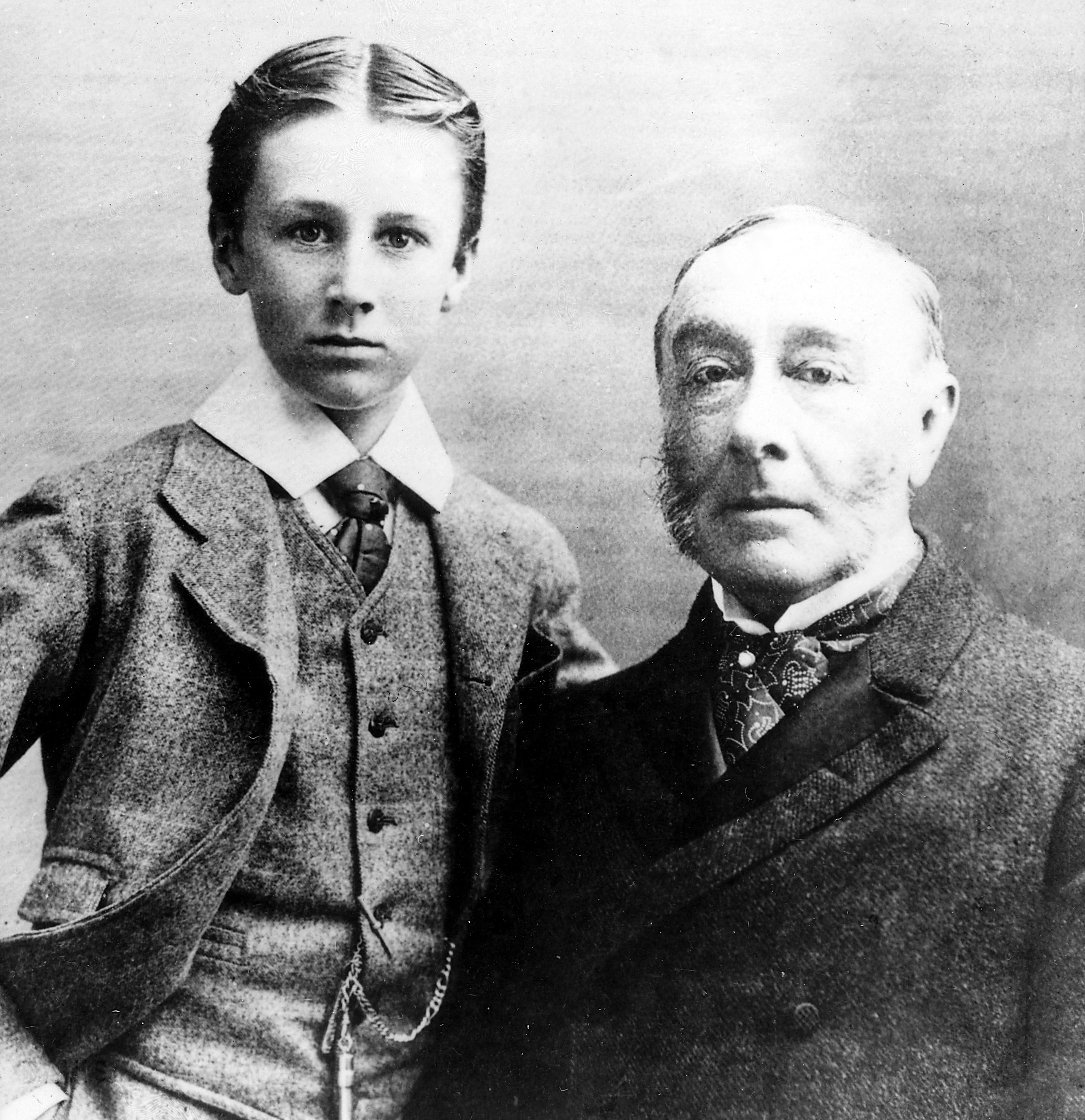
James with his son Franklin in 1895

James Roosevelt I (July 16, 1828 – December 8, 1900), known as "Squire James", was an American businessman, politician, horse breeder, and the father of Franklin D. Roosevelt, the 32nd President of the United States.

== Early life ==
Roosevelt was born on July 16, 1828, in Hyde Park, New York, to businessman Isaac Daniel Roosevelt and Mary Rebecca Aspinwall, sister of William Henry Aspinwall, both half-first cousins of First Lady Elizabeth Monroe. Isaac's parents were businessman and politician Jacobus Roosevelt III and Catherine Welles. James' maternal grandparents were John Aspinwall and Susan Howland.

In 1847, James Roosevelt graduated from Union College in Schenectady, New York.

== Career ==
After obtaining a law degree from Harvard University, Roosevelt joined the law firm of Benjamin D. Silliman, the latter arranging Roosevelt serve on the founding board of directors to the company's client, the Consolidated Coal Company of Maryland. Doug Wead wrote that Roosevelt applied the skills he learned from watching the growth of this company to his own enterprise.

Roosevelt's business interests were primarily in coal and transportation. He was vice president of the Delaware and Hudson Railway and president of the Southern Railway Security Company.

During an 1853 trip to London shortly after his marriage, Roosevelt called upon United States Minister to the United Kingdom James Buchanan and accepted an invitation by Buchanan to serve as the minister's secretary at the embassy. Conrad Black wrote that this began the tradition of members of the Hyde Park Roosevelt family being affiliated with Democratic presidents.

Following the 1863 death of his father, Roosevelt inherited both his wealth and status as patriarch of the family. Roosevelt purchased an estate on which he bestowed the name "Springwood". In 1871, Roosevelt was elected town supervisor of Hyde Park and was pursued as a potential candidate for the New York state assembly or senate or Congress, requests that he turned down despite having an interest in politics.

In the 1880s, Roosevelt donated to the New York gubernatorial campaign of Grover Cleveland and Cleveland's presidential campaign two years later. After the 1884 United States presidential election, in which Cleveland was elected president, the Roosevelt family regularly met with the Clevelands in visits to the White House. Roosevelt was seen by the press as a possible appointee for a diplomatic post within the Cleveland administration, though he turned down these rumors. Roosevelt did contribute to his eldest son James being appointed to the post of First Secretary of the United States Legation in Vienna.

== Personal life ==
Following graduation from Union College in 1847, Roosevelt traveled through Western Europe and the Holy Land before matriculating at Harvard Law School in 1849. In 1853, he married his second cousin, Rebecca Brien Howland, the sister of Meredith Howland. They had one son the next year, James Roosevelt "Rosey" Roosevelt, who married Helen Schermerhorn Astor. In 1875, Rebecca had symptoms of heart disease and was advised by doctors to stop climbing stairs, leading James to install elevators for her to use in both Springwood and their New York home. In August 1876, the couple traveled on James' yacht for a cruise to Long Island Sound, during which Rebecca experienced a massive heart attack and died a short time afterward.

Four years after Rebecca's death, he met a sixth cousin named Sara Ann Delano, daughter of opium merchant Warren Delano Jr., at a party celebrating the graduation of his distant cousin Theodore Roosevelt Jr. from Harvard University. James and Sara were married on October 7, 1880, and became the parents of Franklin Delano Roosevelt in 1882. James reportedly was a caring father to Franklin, but his recurring heart problems eventually made him an invalid. Franklin reacted by becoming fiercely protective of his father.

By the autumn of 1900, Roosevelt's health declined further after his yacht exploded and sank. The disgraceful behavior of his grandson Tadd, who had dropped out of Harvard and married a woman he met in a disreputable dance hall, greatly upset James and probably contributed to his fatal heart attack.

James left the bulk of his estate to Sara, and a modest inheritance to Franklin. He is buried at the churchyard at St. James Episcopal Church in Hyde Park; his grave is flanked by those of his wives.

== In popular culture ==
Roosevelt is voiced by John Lithgow in The Roosevelts, a 2014 documentary series by Ken Burns.

== Legacy ==
In 1927, Franklin and Sara Roosevelt donated money to the town of Hyde Park for the construction of a new library, named after James, and still in use today.
