= Isaac Roosevelt (politician) =

American politician

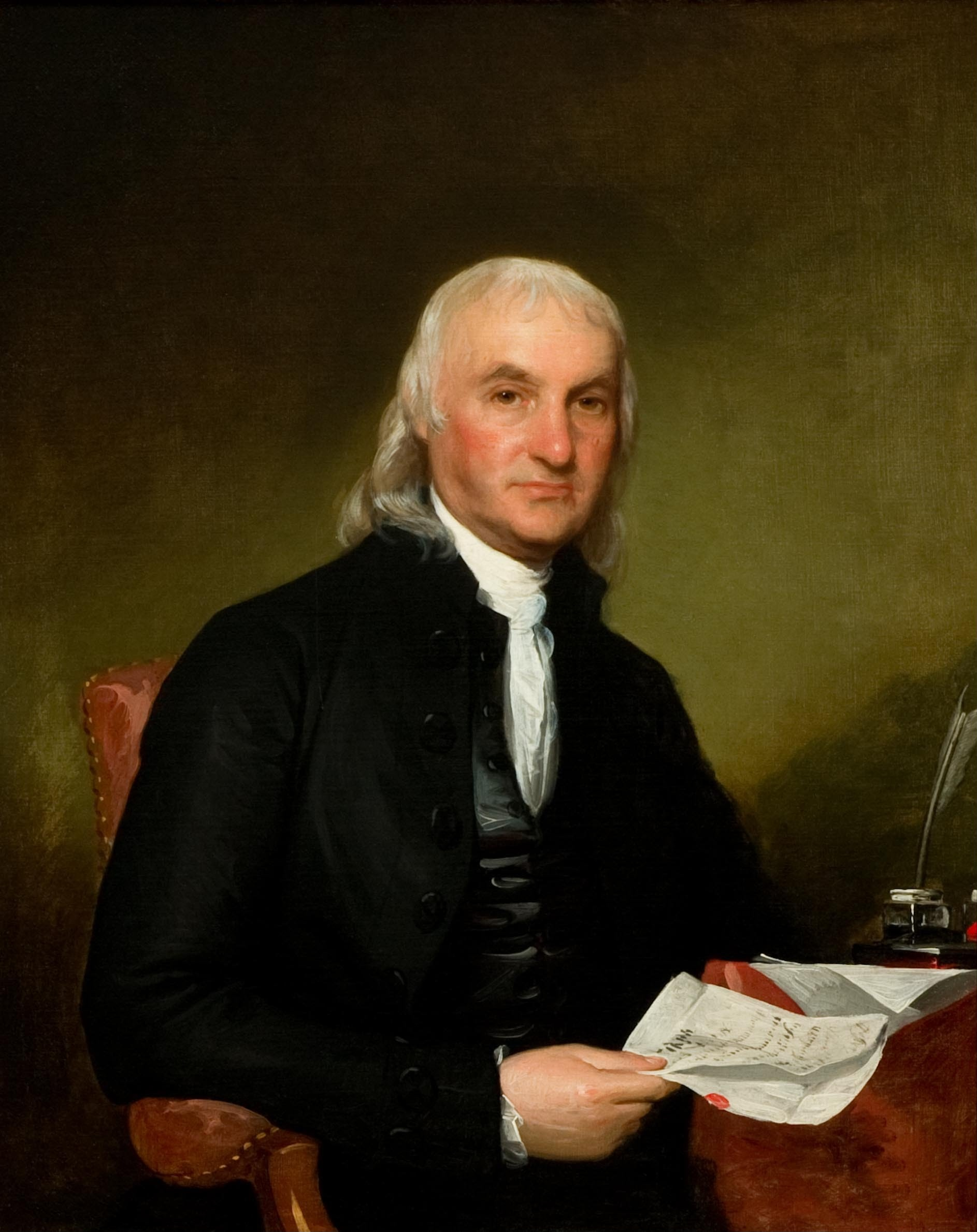

Member of the New York State Senate
- In office July 1, 1788 – June 30, 1792
- In office September 9, 1777 – June 30, 1786

3rd President of the Bank of New York
- In office 1786–1791
- Preceded by: Jeremiah Wadsworth
- Succeeded by: Gulian Verplanck

Personal details
- Born: December 19, 1726 New York City, New York
- Died: October 1794 (aged 67)
- Party: Federalist
- Spouse: Cornelia Hoffman (m. 1752; died 1780)
- Children: 10, including James Roosevelt
- Parent(s): Jacobus Roosevelt; Catharina Hardenbroek
- Relatives: See Roosevelt family
- Occupation: Merchant and Politician

Isaac Roosevelt (December 19, 1726 – October 1794) was an American merchant and Federalist politician. He served in the New York State Assembly and the state Constitutional Convention and achieved the most political success of any Roosevelt before Theodore Roosevelt. Isaac was the patrilineal great-great-grandfather of President Franklin Delano Roosevelt. He was the second generation of what would later come to be known as the Hyde Park, New York branch of the extended Roosevelt family. Isaac's fortune from the refining of sugar, and his political accomplishments became an essential root of the substantial wealth, prominence and influence that the Hyde Park Roosevelts came to amass.

== Early life ==
Roosevelt was born in New York City and baptized in the Reformed Dutch Church of New York. He was the sixth son of Jacobus Roosevelt (1692–1776) and Catharina Hardenbroek, who wed in 1713. His siblings were Johannes (b. 1714), Johannes (b. 1715), Nicholas (b. 1717), Helena (1719–1772), Jacobus (b. 1721), Christoffel (b. 1724), Abraham (b. 1729), Sara (b. 1730), and Adolphus Roosevelt (b. 1735).

His paternal grandfather was Nicholas Roosevelt (1658–1742) and his great-grandfather was the Dutch immigrant Claes Maartenszen Van Rosenvelt (d. 1659), who established the Roosevelt family in America. His maternal grandparents were Johannes Hardenbroek and Sarah (née Van Laer) Hardenbroek.

== Career ==
The Walton Mansion housed the Bank of New York from 1784 to 1787.

Isaac Roosevelt was one of the first large-scale sugar refiners in New York City. During the 1700s, sugar was Europe's most valuable traded agricultural commodity, and it was cultivated almost entirely by slave labor in the Caribbean. Sugar cultivation also entailed an especially high death rate among slaves, due to difficult conditions and disease. During that time, slavery remained legal in New York, and New York City became a center of sugar refining and of the global sugar trade:

"By the 1720s, one of every two ships in the city’s port was either arriving from or heading to the Caribbean, importing sugar and enslaved people and exporting flour, meat and shipbuilding supplies. The trade was so lucrative that Wall Street’s most impressive buildings were Trinity Church at one end, facing the Hudson River, and the five-story sugar warehouses on the other, close to the East River and near the busy slave market."

Roosevelt built one of the first sugar refineries in the city, and originally had his store on Wall Street, later removing to St. George's Square.

Isaac Roosevelt is removed from his house in Wall Street to the house of his late brother, Jacobus Roosevelt, Jr., deceased, near the Sugar house, and opposite to Mr. William Waltons, being on the northwest side of Queen Street, where his customers may be supplied as usual with double, middling and single refined loaf sugars, clarified, muscovado and other molasses, & etc."

— April 25, 1772

Active in the community, he was one of the first members of the New York City Chamber of Commerce, organized in 1768, and he was one of the original incorporators of the first public hospital in New York in 1770. In 1784, together with Alexander Hamilton, he was a cofounder of the Bank of New York, one of the oldest still-existing banks in America. In 1786, he succeeded Jeremiah Wadsworth to become the bank's third president, a post he held until 1791. Roosevelt was succeeded by Gulian Verplanck, Speaker of the New York State Assembly.

=== Political office ===
A noted patriot, he was elected to the New York Provincial Congress on April 22, 1775. He was one of the Committee of One Hundred that took control of the state government in May 1775. Though he felt no allegiance to England, he was initially a moderate, hoping to prevent conflict. However, he withdrew from New York when the British occupied the city, and spent the period of occupation at his wife's home in Dutchess County, serving with the Sixth Regiment of the Dutchess County Militia.

After the war, as one of ten representatives from New York City (among John Jay, Alexander Hamilton, and Robert R. Livingston), he took part in the New York State Convention at Poughkeepsie on June 18, 1788, that deliberated on the adoption of the United States Constitution. He was a member of the New York State Senate (Southern District) from 1777 to 1786, and from 1788 to 1792.

== Personal life ==
On September 22, 1752, he married Cornelia Hoffman (1734–1780), great-granddaughter of one of the first Estonians in the United States and daughter of Tryntje (née Benson) (1712–1765) and Martinus Hoffman (1706–1772), a prominent Dutchess County landowner and member of the Hoffman family. She was the sister of Anthony Hoffman (1739–1790) and the aunt of Josiah Ogden Hoffman (1766–1837). After her mother's death, Cornelia's father Martinus, married Alida Livingston Hansen, a member of the Livingston family who was the widow of Henry Hansen and younger sister of Philip Livingston, a signer of the Declaration of Independence. Together, Isaac and Cornelia had ten children:

- Abraham Roosevelt (b. 1753), who died young
- Martinus Roosevelt (b. 1754), who died young
- Catharine Roosevelt (b. 1756), who died unmarried
- Sarah Roosevelt (b. 1758), who died unmarried
- Jacobus "James" Roosevelt III (1760–1847), who married Maria Eliza Walton (1769–1810), then Catharine Elizabeth Barclay (c. 1783–1816), then Harriet Howland (1784–1856).
- Cornelia Roosevelt (b. 1761), who died young
- Maria Roosevelt (b. 1763), who married Richard Varick (1753–1831), a Mayor of New York City.
- Martin Roosevelt (1765–1781), who died at College.
- Cornelia Roosevelt (1767–1818), who married Dr. Benjamin Kissam (1759–1803) on January 10, 1786.
- Helen Roosevelt (b. 1768), who died unmarried.

Roosevelt died in October 1794.

=== Descendants ===
Through his son, James, he was a grandfather to Isaac Roosevelt (1790–1863) who married Mary Rebecca Aspinwall (1809–1886), Grace Roosevelt (1792–1828), who married Guy Carlton Bayley (1786–1859), James Roosevelt (1794–1823), Walton Roosevelt (1796–1836), Edward Roosevelt (1799–1832), Richard Varick Roosevelt (1801–1835) who married Anna Maria Lyle, Hamilton Roosevelt (1805–1827), Henry Walton Roosevelt (1809–1827), Susan Barclay Roosevelt (1813–1867), and James Barclay Roosevelt (b. 1815).

Through his daughter Cornelia, he was a grandfather to: Cornelia Catharine Kissam who married Dr. Caspar Wistar Eddy, Benjamin Roosevelt Kissam (b. 1793) who married Mary A. Berdan, Maria Ann Kissam (1788–1871), Helen Kissam (1790–1870) who married John L. Lefferts, Richard Varick Kissam (1795–1869) who married Maria Latourette, Emma Charlotte Kissam who married Francis Armstrong Livingston (1795–1851) a nephew of Peter R. and Maturin Livingston, and Ameila Charlotte Kissam (b. 1799).
