= Archibald Laidlie =

Dutch reformed clergy

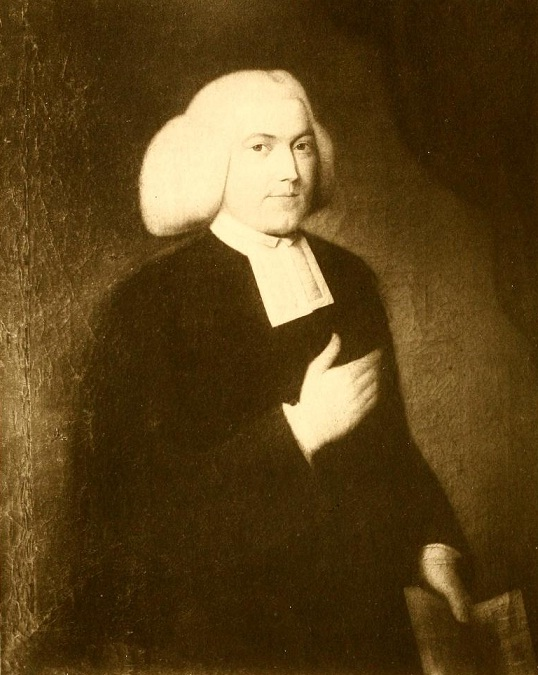
- Born: 4 December 1727; Kelso, Scotland
- Died: 1779 (aged 51–52); United States
- Occupation: pastor
- Known for: first English-speaking pastor of the Dutch Reformed Church in America

Archibald Laidlie (4 December 1727 – 1779) was a clergyman of the Dutch Reformed Church in the United States.

He married Maria Hoffman (1743–1825), sister of State Senator Anthony Hoffman (1739–1790), and they had five children.
