= Eliza Howland =

American author

Eliza Newton Woolsey Howland (1835 – 1917) was an American author and the wife of Union Army officer Joseph Howland.

== Life ==
Howland was born on 22 July 1835 to a prominent New York City family active in philanthropy and social reform, especially abolitionism and the decent care of the mentally ill. Her parents were Charles William Woolsey, a descendant of an early English settler in what was then the Dutch colony of New Amsterdam, and Jane Eliza Newton of Alexandria, Virginia.

At the age of nineteen, she married Joseph Howland, the son of Samuel Shaw Howland, a New York City shipping magnate. The couple honeymooned in Europe and the Holy Land. During the Italian leg of their trip, the couple commissioned marble busts of themselves from the neoclassical sculptor, Giovanni Maria Benzoni. After their honeymoon, Joseph and Eliza Howland moved to Tioronda, an estate Joseph bought along the banks of the Fishkill Creek in Matteawan, New York, present-day Beacon, New York.

During the American Civil War, Joseph joined the Sixteenth New York Volunteers and served until he was seriously wounded during the Seven Days Battles of the Peninsular Campaign. According to family letters, she began her contribution to the war effort by making pillowcases and hospital gowns for the army.

== Works ==
During her husband's absence, Howland and her sister Georgeanna Woolsey wrote constantly to each other, their correspondence being eventually published in 1899 as Letters of a family during the Civil War, 1861-1865. This book was republished in 2001 as My Heart Towards Home: letters of a family during the Civil War. Howland also wrote and privately printed Family records: being some account of the ancestry of my mother and father Charles William Woolsey and Jane Eliza Newton in 1900.

In 1885, Joseph Howland died while on a trip to Menton, France. Eliza Howland left their estate at Tioronda and never returned to it, claiming that the memories of her husband made staying in the house too difficult.

She died in Newport, Rhode Island, on 3 July 1917 at the age of 82. After her death the family's estate at Tioronda became Craig House, a hospital for the mentally ill.
