= James Roosevelt Roosevelt =

American diplomat (1854–1927)

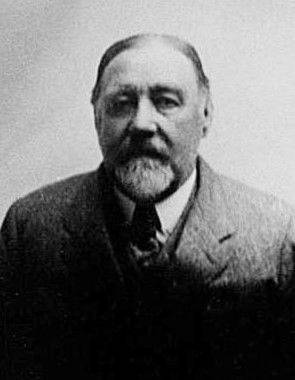
- Roosevelt in 1922
- Born: April 27, 1854
- Died: May 7, 1927 (aged 73); Hyde Park, New York, U.S.
- Other name: Rosy
- Education: Columbia University (1877)
- Occupation: Diplomat
- Spouses: Helen Schermerhorn Astor (m. 1878; died 1893) Elizabeth Riley (m. 1914)
- Children: 2, including Tadd
- Father: James Roosevelt I
- Relatives: Roosevelt family

James Roosevelt "Rosy" Roosevelt (April 27, 1854 – May 7, 1927) was an American diplomat, heir, and the older half-brother of Franklin Delano Roosevelt, the 32nd president of the United States.

== Early life ==
James Roosevelt "Rosy" Roosevelt was born on April 27, 1854. He was the son of James Roosevelt I (1828–1900) and his first wife, Rebecca Brien Howland (1831–1876), who were second cousins. When his father died in 1900, the family's estate was split between Rosy and his half-brother, Franklin. Throughout his life he was considered "an aimless if charming member of New York society's sporting set."

== Career ==
Roosevelt graduated with honors from Columbia College in 1877. President Grover Cleveland, who counted Rosy's father as a friend and supporter, appointed him first secretary of the United States legation in Vienna, Austria, and as first secretary of the embassy in London, England.

Roosevelt was a trustee of the Cathedral of St. John the Divine and a close friend of Cardinal Patrick Joseph Hayes. He donated more than $250,000 to St. Francis Hospital in New York and also gave substantial funds to the parish of St. James Episcopal Church in Hyde Park, New York.

During World War I, he sold Liberty bonds and war savings stamps from an office he maintained in New York's Post Office Building.

== Personal life ==
On November 18, 1878, Roosevelt married Helen Schermerhorn Astor (1855–1893), the second daughter of businessman William Backhouse Astor Jr. (1829–1892) and socialite Caroline Webster Schermerhorn (1830–1908). Together, Roosevelt and Helen had two children:

- James Roosevelt "Tadd" Roosevelt Jr. (1879–1958), who married Sadie Messinger (c. 1880–1940)
- Helen Rebecca Roosevelt (1881–1962), who in 1904 married Theodore Douglas Robinson (1883–1934), the eldest nephew of President Theodore Roosevelt (1858–1919)

After his first wife's death in 1893, Roosevelt married Elizabeth Riley on August 7, 1914. On May 7, 1927, Roosevelt died at his Hyde Park home as a result of complications related to bronchitis and asthma, according to news reports at the time. His second wife died in 1948.
