= Howland & Aspinwall =

Howland & Aspinwall was a merchant firm based in New York City in the 1830s and 1840s. It specialized in the Pacific Ocean trade, especially the importing of goods from China. It is best known for taking a pioneering role in the financing of clipper ships, especially the American-built Rainbow and Sea Witch.

== History ==
House flag used by Howland & Aspinwall

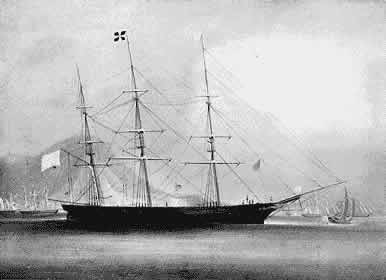
The Sea Witch

The firm, originally known as G.G. & S.S. Howland, was founded by brothers Gardiner Greene Howland and Samuel Shaw Howland. In 1832, upon the admission of their clerk, William Henry Aspinwall, the firm became known as Howland & Aspinwall.

Howland & Aspinwall imported luxury goods such as porcelain, silk, and tea from China, and sold them to Americans of means. Import duties paid by firms such as Howland & Aspinwall played a significant role in the financing of the American federal budget during the 1840s. Howland & Aspinwall exported opium to China.

=== Pacific Mail Steamship Company ===
In 1848, as a result of the United States's acquisition of California, partners G.S. Howland, S.S. Howland, and William Henry Aspinwall turned their attention from the China trade to California traffic. Improvements in the marine steam engine had begun to make clipper ships and other fast sailing ships obsolete. With other New York businessmen, the Howland and Aspinwall interests formed the Pacific Mail Steamship Company. Pacific Mail eventually became American President Lines, which is now part of Neptune Orient Lines.

=== Legacy ===
Part of the Aspinwall family fortune was eventually bequeathed, through paternal grandmother Mary Aspinwall Roosevelt, to Franklin D. Roosevelt, 32nd President of the United States.
