= Isaac Roosevelt (businessman) =

American doctor, farmer, and grandfather of U.S. President Franklin D. Roosevelt

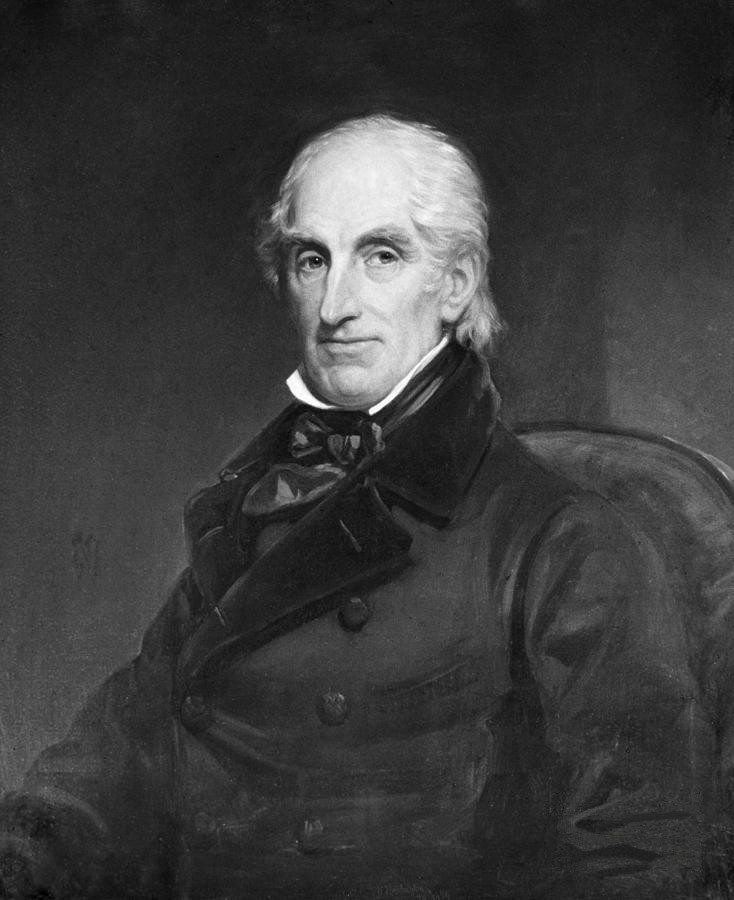
- Born: Isaac Daniel Roosevelt; September 29, 1790; New York City, New York, U.S.
- Died: December 24, 1863 (aged 73); Hyde Park, New York, U.S.
- Occupations: Medical Doctor, farmer
- Spouse: Mary Rebecca Aspinwall (m. 1825)
- Children: James Roosevelt I John Aspinwall Roosevelt
- Parent(s): James Roosevelt; Maria Eliza Walton
- Relatives: See Roosevelt family

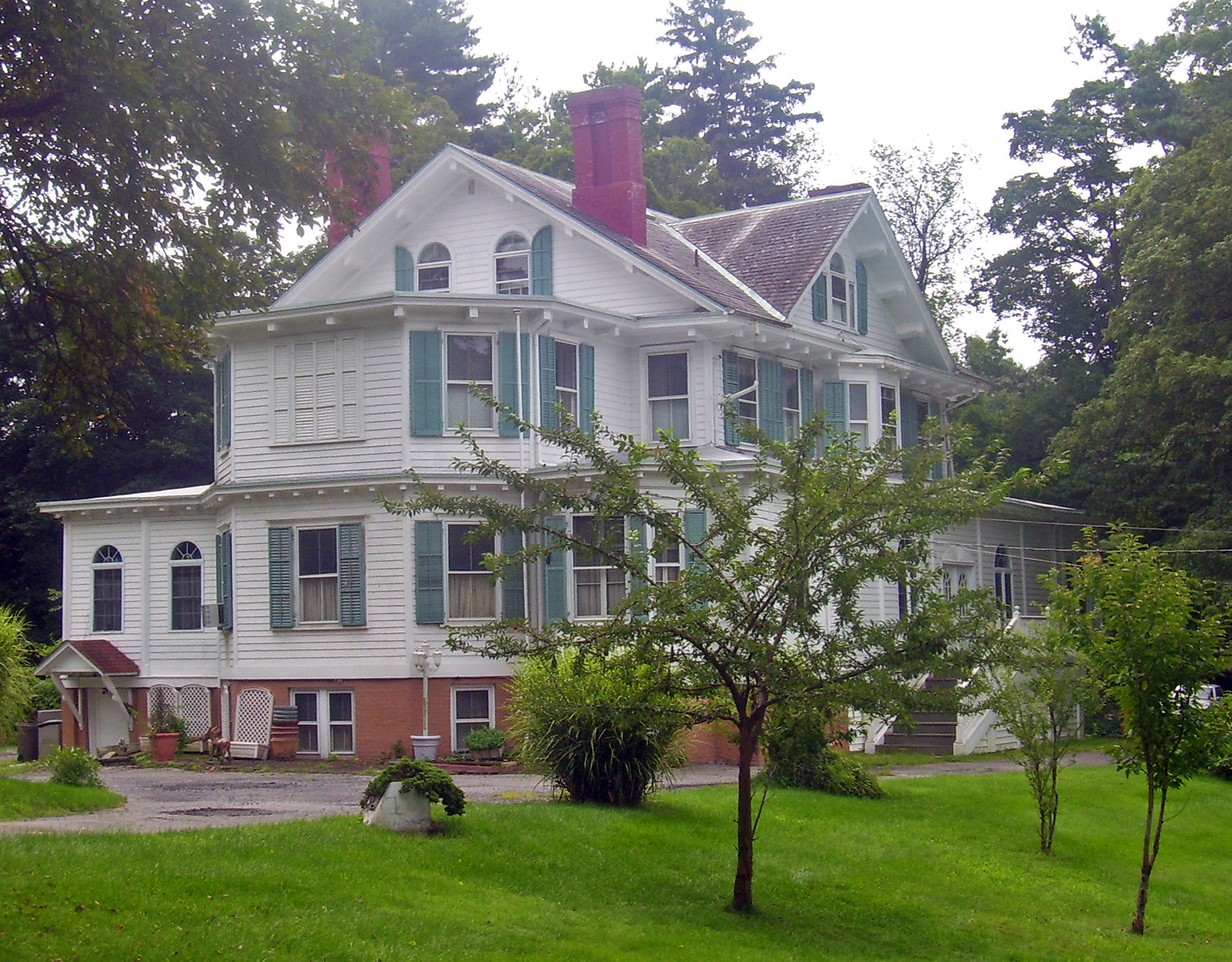
Isaac Roosevelt House in Hyde Park

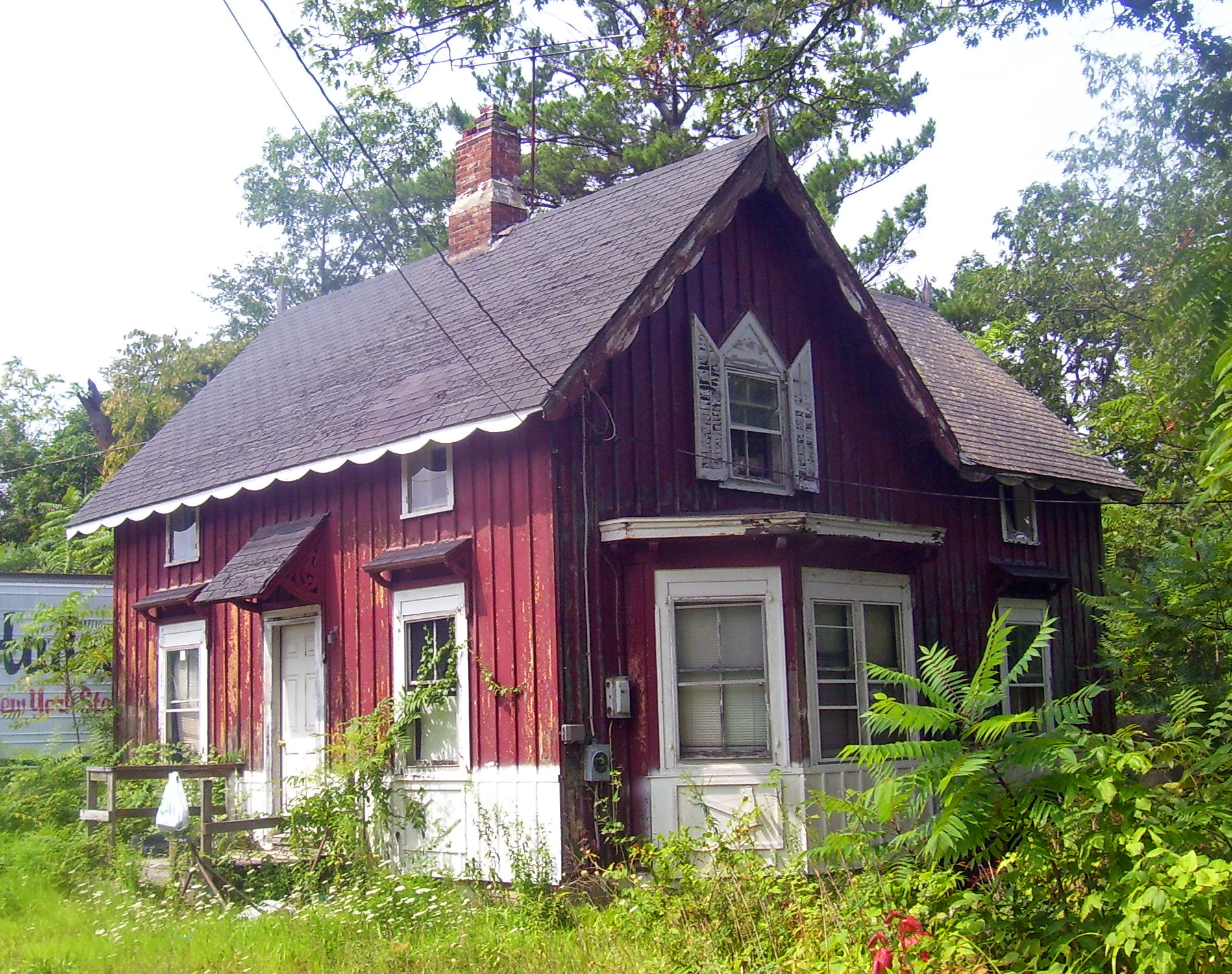
Roosevelt Cottage

Isaac Daniel Roosevelt (September 29, 1790 – December 24, 1863) was an American medical doctor and farmer. He was the paternal grandfather of U.S. President Franklin D. Roosevelt.

== Early life ==
Roosevelt was born on September 29, 1790, in New York City, he was the oldest surviving son of businessman and politician James Roosevelt (1760–1847) and Maria Eliza Walton (1769–1810), the daughter of Admiral Gerard Walton (d. 1821) and a descendant of Wilhelmus Beekman, who was the treasurer of the Dutch West India Company, Mayor of New York City, Governor of Delaware from 1653 to 1664, and Governor of Pennsylvania from 1658 to 1663.

His paternal grandparents were merchant and politician Isaac Roosevelt (1726–1794), a New York State Assemblyman and member of the New York State Constitutional Convention, and Cornelia Hoffman. He was the 3x-great-grandson of the first Roosevelt in America, Claes Maartenszen Van Rosenvelt (d. 1659).

== Career ==
Roosevelt attended Princeton University before graduating in 1808. He then attended the College of Physicians and Surgeons in New York, receiving the degree of M.D. in 1812. He continued his medical studies until 1820 with Dr. David Hosack. Despite his extensive training, Roosevelt never practiced medicine, reportedly due to his inability to "bear the sight of human suffering."

Instead, Roosevelt's passions were with farming and when his father purchased Mount Hope, a large tract of land in Hyde Park, New York, along the Hudson River, Roosevelt left New York City to live there permanently. In 1832, near his father's home, Roosevelt built a house at the center of his estate called Rosedale. Today it is known as the Isaac Roosevelt House and still stands on Riverview Circle in Hyde Park. The home was listed on the National Register of Historic Places in 1993, along with a cottage and boathouse on the Hudson River nearby.

== Personal life ==
In 1825, he married Mary Rebecca Aspinwall (1809–1886), daughter of merchant John Aspinwall (1779–1847) and Susan (née Howland) Aspinwall (1779–1852) of New York. Together, they had two sons:

- James Roosevelt I (1828–1900), who first married Rebecca Brien Howland (1831–1876). After her death, he married Sara Ann Delano (1854–1941)
- John Aspinwall Roosevelt (1840–1909), who married Ellen M. Crosby (1837–1928), daughter of William Henry Crosby, on June 6, 1866.

He died on December 24, 1863, at the age of 73 in Hyde Park, New York. His elder son, James, inherited Mount Hope (which burnt down in 1866 and the land was sold to the state of New York after which he purchased Springwood in Hyde Park), and his younger son, John, inherited Rosedale.

=== Descendants ===
His eldest son, James Roosevelt I, was the father of diplomat James Roosevelt Roosevelt (1854–1927), with Howland, and President Franklin Delano Roosevelt (1882– 1945), with Delano. Younger son, John Aspinwall, was the father of tennis players Grace Walton Roosevelt (1867–1945) and Ellen Crosby Roosevelt (1868–1954).
