= James Roosevelt (1760–1847) =

American businessman

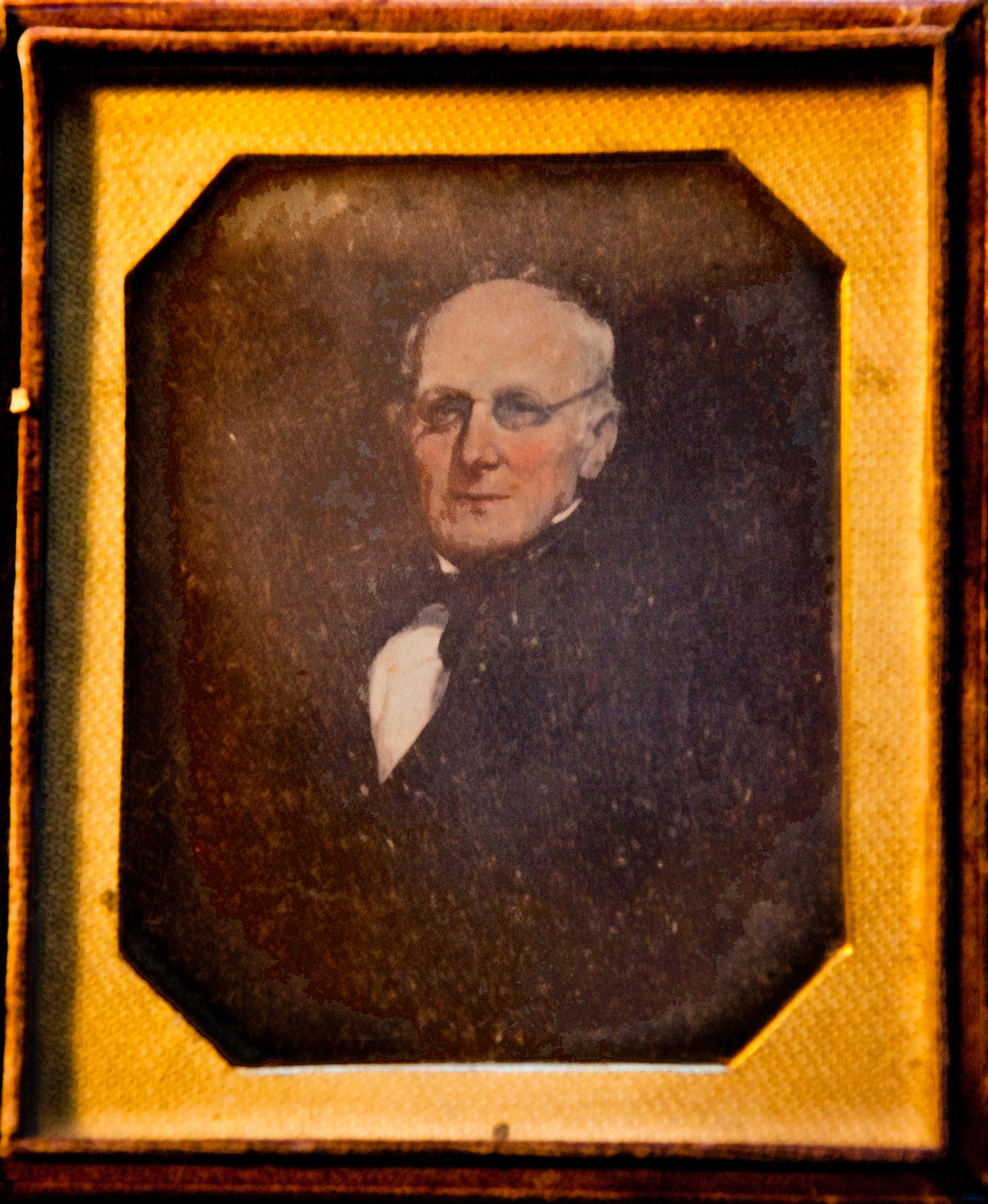

Alderman in New York City Council for the Fourth Ward
- In office January 1, 1809 – December 31, 1809

Member of the New York State Assembly for New York City
- In office July 1, 1796 – June 30, 1797

Personal details
- Born: Jacobus Roosevelt III; January 10, 1760 New York City
- Died: February 6, 1847 (aged 87) Hyde Park, New York, U.S.
- Party: Federalist Party
- Spouses: Maria Eliza Walton (m. 1786; died 1810) Catharine Elizabeth Barclay (m. 1812; died 1816) Harriet Howland (m. 1821)
- Relations: See Roosevelt family
- Children: 13, including Isaac
- Parent(s): Isaac Roosevelt; Cornelia Hoffman
- Education: Princeton College (1780)
- Occupation: Businessman and Politician

Jacobus "James" Roosevelt III (January 10, 1760 – February 6, 1847) was an American businessman and politician from New York City. A member of the Roosevelt family, he was the son of Isaac Roosevelt and great-grandfather of President Franklin D. Roosevelt.

== Early life ==
Jacobus Roosevelt III was born on January 10, 1760, in New York City to Isaac Roosevelt (1726–1794) and Cornelia Hoffman. Isaac was the great-grandson of Claes Maartenszen Van Rosenvelt, the first Roosevelt in America. He was baptized on January 23, 1760, and graduated from Princeton University in 1780.

== Career ==
Roosevelt, like his father, was a sugar-refiner. A banker in post-revolutionary New York, he amassed a large fortune in addition to his inheritance. He worked out of 333 Pearl Street under the firm of C. J. & H. Roosevelt. He was an active Federalist; he served in the New York State Assembly in 1796 and 1797 and was an alderman in the New York City Council for the Fourth Ward in 1809.

His interest in politics was less than previous Roosevelts, including his father; he was the last of his branch of the family to engage in politics until his great-grandson, Franklin Delano Roosevelt. He engaged in some philanthropy with the large fortune he acquired through business. He was also involved in the Bank of New York like his father, but was never its president.

At one point, he owned stony farmland at Harlem, now occupied by 120 city blocks between 110th and 125th streets and Fifth Avenue and the East River. He sold it for $25,000, partly to John Jacob Astor. In 1819, Roosevelt removed to Poughkeepsie and bought a large tract of land on the Hudson River called Mount Hope.

== Personal life ==
Roosevelt married three times and, in total, had 13 children, several of whom died young. His first marriage took place on November 15, 1786 in New York City to Maria Eliza Walton (1769–1810), the daughter of Admiral Gerard Walton (died 1821) and a descendant of Wilhelmus Beekman, who was the treasurer of the Dutch West India Company, mayor of New York City, governor of Delaware from 1653 to 1664, and governor of Pennsylvania from 1658 to 1663. Their children who survived infancy were:

- Isaac Roosevelt (1790–1863), who married Mary Rebecca Aspinwall (1809–1886).
- Grace Roosevelt (1792–1828), who married Guy Carlton Bayley (1786–1859), the son of Richard Bayley.
- James Roosevelt (1794–1823)
- Walton Roosevelt (1796–1836)
- Edward Roosevelt (1799–1832)
- Richard Varick Roosevelt (1801–1835), who married Anna Maria Lyle on April 23, 1823.
- Hamilton Roosevelt (1805–1827), who died at sea on a trip from Mexico
- Henry Walton Roosevelt (1809–1827)

After Walton's death in 1810, he married on September 2, 1812, for the second time to Catharine Elizabeth Barclay (c. 1783–1816) in New York City. Before her death in 1816, they had:

- Susan Barclay Roosevelt (1813–1867), died without issue
- James Barclay Roosevelt (b. 1815), died without issue

After Barclay's death in 1816, he married for the third and final time on January 29, 1821, to Harriet Howland (1784–1856), a descendant of John Howland, a signor of the Mayflower Compact.

Roosevelt died on February 6, 1847.

Descendants

Through his son, Isaac Roosevelt, James was the grandfather of James Roosevelt, Sr. (1828–1900), and the great-grandfather of U.S. President Franklin D. Roosevelt (1882–1945). Through his daughter, Grace Roosevelt Bayley, he was the grandfather of James Roosevelt Bayley (1814–1877), the first Bishop of Newark (1853–72) and the eighth Archbishop of Baltimore (1872–77).
