= William Aspinwall =

English-American pioneer and theologian

Coat of Arms of William Aspinwall

William Aspinwall (c. 1605 – c. 1662) was an Englishman who emigrated to Boston with the Winthrop Fleet in 1630. He played an integral part in the early religious controversies of the Massachusetts Bay Colony.

== Life ==
Aspinwall as most of the Aspinwalls probably came from the County of Lancaster, England.

He arrived at Massachusetts Bay onboard Arbella, part of the Winthrop Fleet, on 17 June 1630. He was accompanied by his wife, Elizabeth, who was sixteen at that time. Among with other settlers he came ashore at Charlestown on 1 July and was appointed a deacon. On 3 April 1632, Aspinwall took the oath of a freeman.

In 1633, he moved to Boston, where he was one of the leading figures of the new settlement, and in 1637 replaced Sir Henry Vane as a Deputy to the General Court.

At the time, Aspinwall was involved in the Antinomian Controversy, which severely divided the Massachusetts Bay Colony from 1636 to 1638. He joined himself with the adherents of Anne Hutchinson and John Wheelwright, aided in drafting their famous petition, and departed with them to Rhode Island. He was at Portsmouth, Province of New Hampshire, in 1638, where he signed the covenant of formation, but he moved to the New Haven Colony in 1641.

By 1642, Aspinwall had rehabilitated his relations with the Boston authorities, and he began to acquire employment there recording official documents. In 1643, he joined the Ancient and Honorable Artillery Company of Massachusetts. It was declared by the Boston court in 1644 that Aspinwall "shall be a public notary for his jurisdiction," and he continued at this post until 1651. As a skilled surveyor, he joined a group of Boston merchants on an unsuccessful expedition up the Delaware River in search of furs. He was one of Boston's delegates to the Cambridge Synod of 1646.

Relations ran afoul for Aspinwall again in Boston, and in 1652 he sold his property and returned to England, where he was living in Cheshire as late as April 13, 1662. Upon his return to England, he became one of the Fifth Monarchists, a radical religious sect that had a brief existence in the turmoil of the Commonwealth of England.

He probably had seven children.

== Works ==
Aspinwall published theological tracts following his return to England. He compiled the Boston Book of Possessions listing the property of every freeman of the city. His notary records were published in 1903 by the Boston Record Commissioners as A Volume Relating to the Early History of Boston Containing the Aspinwall Notarial Records from 1644 to 1651.
