= DeWitt Clinton (disambiguation) =

DeWitt Clinton (1769–1828) was an American politician.

DeWitt Clinton may also refer to:

== People ==
- DeWitt Clinton Baxter (1829–1881), American artist and engraver
- DeWitt Clinton Blair (1833–1915), American philanthropist and industrialist
- DeWitt Clinton Boutelle (1820–1884), American painter
- DeWitt Clinton Cregier (1829–1898), mayor of Chicago, Illinois
- Dewitt Clinton Haskin (c. 1824–1900), American engineer
- DeWitt Clinton Hoyt (1824–1898), American politician
- DeWitt Clinton Jansen (1840–1894), American member of the Shanghai Municipal Council
- Dewitt Clinton Leach (1822–1890), American politician and journalist
- Dewitt Clinton Lewis (1822–1899), American Medal of Honor recipient
- DeWitt Clinton Littlejohn (1818–1892), American officer and politician
- DeWitt Clinton Poole (1885–1952), American intelligence officer
- DeWitt Clinton Ramsey (1888–1961), American navy admiral
- DeWitt Clinton Senter (1830–1898), governor of Tennessee
- DeWitt Clinton Smith Jr. (1920–2005), American army officer

== Other uses ==
- DeWitt Clinton (locomotive), locomotive
- DeWitt Clinton High School, high school in Bronx, New York
- DeWitt Clinton School, elementary school in Chicago, Illinois

== See also ==
- List of places named for DeWitt Clinton
