= 1789 United States Senate elections in New York =

1789 United States Senate election in New York
- July 16, 1789
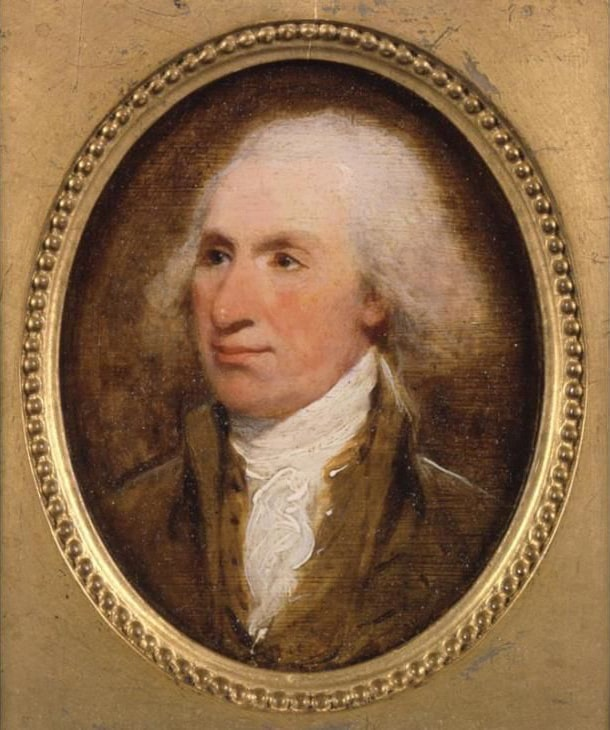

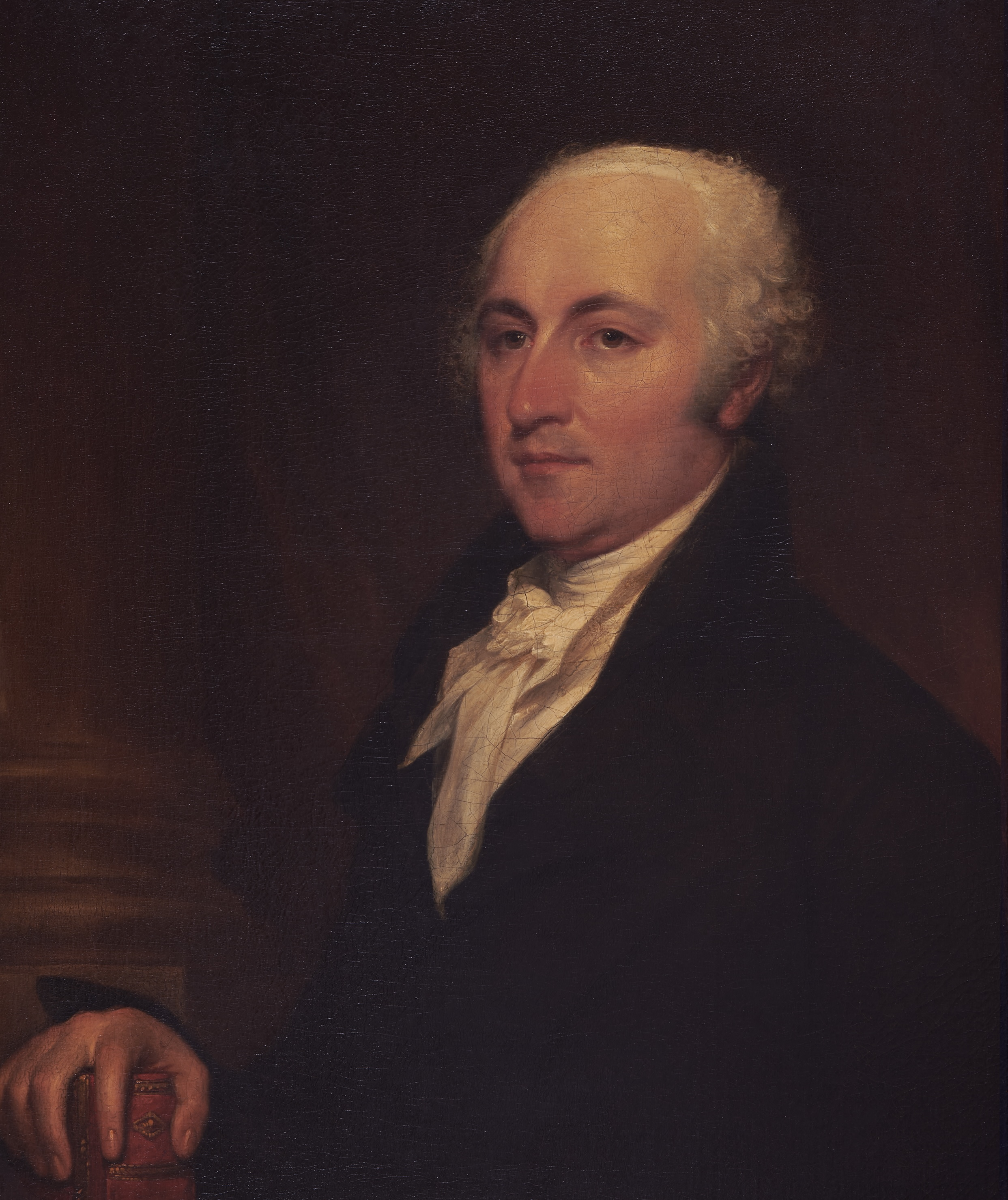
Nominee	Philip Schuyler; Class I	Rufus King; Class III
Party	Federalist	Federalist
Elected U.S. Senators
Philip Schuyler (Class I)
Rufus King (Class III)

The 1789 United States Senate election in New York was held in July 1789 to elect two U.S. senators to represent the State of New York in the United States Senate. It was the first such election, and before the actual election the New York State Legislature had to establish the proceedings how to elect the senators.

== Background ==
The United States Constitution was adopted on September 17, 1787, by the Constitutional Convention in Philadelphia, and then ratified by the States. On July 8, 1788, the Congress of the Confederation passed a resolution calling the first session of the First United States Congress for March 4, 1789, and the election of U.S. senators and U.S. representatives in the meanwhile by the States. New York ratified the U.S. Constitution on July 26, 1788.

== Legislation ==
In February and March 1789, the 12th New York State Legislature (term 1788–89) debated at length "An act for prescribing the times, places and manner of holding elections for Senators of the United States of America, to be chosen in this State", but the Anti-Federalist Assembly majority and the Federalist Senate majority could not agree, and they adjourned on March 3, without having elected U.S. senators. Both sides expected to win the State election in April.

On June 4, Governor George Clinton called an extra session of the State Legislature to convene on July 6 at City Hall in Albany, New York. At the state election in April 1789, for a term beginning on July 1, a large Federalist majority had been elected to the New York State Assembly (65 members), estimated by State Senator James Duane at 42 to 22. The New York State Senate (24 members) continued with a slim Federalist majority.

The 13th New York State Legislature (term 1789–90) convened on July 6, and on July 11 passed "An act directing the manner of electing Senators to represent this State in the Senate of the United States", which required the election to be made by "concurrent vote" of both houses of the Legislature. This meant, if only one U.S. senator was to be elected, that each house nominated a candidate, and if both houses nominated the same person ("concurred"), the nominee was elected. If the Assembly nominated one, the Senate another, then the Senate's nominee was voted upon in the Assembly and the Assembly's nominee in the Senate; if none of the nominees was accepted by the other house, the proceedings started at the beginning. If two U.S. senators were to be elected, and Assembly and Senate chose different nominees, then the Assembly should elect one of the two Senate nominees, and the Senate one of the two Assembly nominees, effectively leaving one seat to be filled by each house of the Legislature.

On July 13, the law was submitted to the Council of Revision. On July 15, the Council objected to the law in two points:

- The Council argued that the choice of U.S. senators by the State Legislature, under the U.S. Constitution, did not require a state law, since the State Legislature does not act in its legislative capacity, and the U.S. senators may be chosen simply by concurrent resolution. On the other side, if the U.S. senators were appointed by a state law passed by the State Legislature, the Council of Revision could object to the appointees, forcing to demand a two-thirds majority to overcome the Council's veto.
- The Council also took exception to the splitting of the seats in the case of two vacancies which would lead to one or both of the U.S. senators being elected contrary to the wishes of one or both of the houses of the State Legislature.

Thus the law was vetoed, and the State Legislature was left to fill the seats without written rules. In practice, the Assembly and the Senate separately took a vote, and if the winner in both houses was the same, he was declared elected. If Assembly and Senate chose different persons, the houses met for a joint ballot, which occurred for the first time in 1802.

== Election and aftermath ==
On July 16, after the Council of Revision had vetoed the law, State Senator Philip Schuyler and Assemblyman Rufus King, two Federalists, were appointed to the U.S. Senate by a joint resolution of both houses of the State Legislature. King took his seat on July 25, and drew the lot for Class 3, his term expiring on March 3, 1795. Schuyler took his seat on July 27, and drew the lot for Class 1, his term expiring on March 3, 1791. The 1st United States Congress convened at New York City, as did the regular session of the New York State Legislature in January 1790. Schuyler retained his seat in the State Senate while serving concurrently in the U.S. Senate. Schuyler was also elected on January 15 a member of the State's Council of Appointments, which consisted of the governor of New York and four state senators elected annually by the State Assembly. On January 27, the New York State Legislature resolved that it was "incompatible with the U.S. Constitution for any person holding an office under the United States government at the same time to have a seat in the Legislature of this State", and that if a member of the State Legislature was elected or appointed to a federal office, the seat should be declared vacant upon acceptance. Thus U.S. Senator Schuyler, Federal Judge James Duane and Congressmen John Hathorn and John Laurance vacated their seats in the State Senate. On April 3, John Cantine, a member of the Council of Appointments, raised the question if Schuyler, after vacating his State Senate seat, was still a member of the Council. Philip Livingston, another member, held that once elected a member could not be expelled in any case. On April 5, Governor Clinton asked the State Assembly for a decision, but the latter refused to do so, arguing that it was a question of law, which could be pursued in the courts. Schuyler thus kept his seat in the Council of Appointments until the end of the term.

== Sources ==
- The New York Civil List compiled in 1858 (see: pg. 113 for state senators 1788–89; pg. 114 for state senators 1789–90; page 164 for Members of Assembly 1788–89; pg. 165 for Members of Assembly 1789–90)
- The Documentary History of the First Federal elections 1788–1790 Vol. 3, by Gordon DenBoer (pages 514ff)
- The First United States Congress
- History of Political Parties in the State of New-York by Jabez Delano Hammond (pages 43f)
