= 13th New York State Legislature =

New York state legislative session

←	12th	14th	→
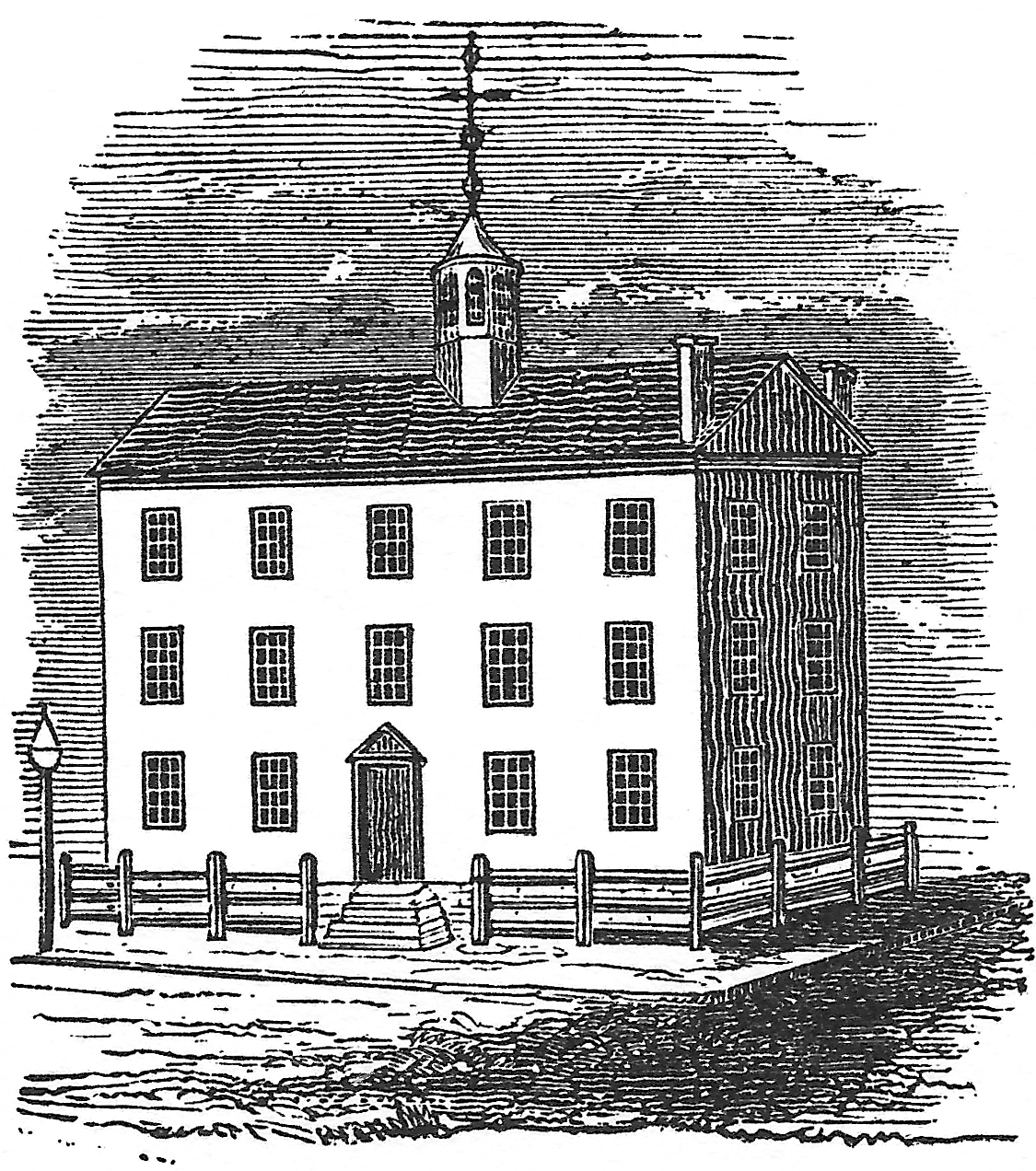
- The Old Albany City Hall, where the Legislature met for the special session in July 1789 (undated)

Overview
- Legislative body: New York State Legislature
- Jurisdiction: New York, United States
- Term: July 1, 1789 – June 30, 1790

Senate
- Members: 24
- President: Lt. Gov. Pierre Van Cortlandt
- Party control: Federalist

Assembly
- Members: 70 (de facto 65)
- Speaker: Gulian Verplanck (Fed.)
- Party control: Federalist

Sessions
- 1st: July 6, 1789 – July 16, 1789
- 2nd: January 12, 1790 – April 6, 1790

The 13th New York State Legislature, consisting of the New York State Senate and the New York State Assembly, met from July 6, 1789, to April 6, 1790, during the thirteenth year of George Clinton's governorship, first in Albany, then in New York City.

== Background ==
Under the provisions of the New York Constitution of 1777, the state senators were elected on general tickets in the senatorial districts, and were then divided into four classes. Six senators each drew lots for a term of 1, 2, 3 or 4 years and, beginning at the election in April 1778, every year six Senate seats came up for election to a four-year term. Assemblymen were elected countywide on general tickets to a one-year term, the whole assembly being renewed annually.

In March 1786, the legislature enacted that future legislatures meet on the first Tuesday of January of each year unless called earlier by the governor. No general meeting place was determined, leaving it to each legislature to name the place where to reconvene, and if no place could be agreed upon, the legislature should meet again where it adjourned.

A convention met from June 17 to July 26, 1788, at Poughkeepsie, and ratified the U.S. Constitution by a vote of 30 to 27. This was the first time that the politicians were divided into two opposing political parties: those who advocated the creation of a stronger federal government and the adoption of the US Constitution, as drafted, were henceforth known as Federalists, those who advocated stronger state governments and demanded many changes to the proposed Constitution as Anti-Federalists, or Democratic-Republicans.

On January 27, 1789, the legislature divided the State of New York into six congressional districts, and the first congressional elections in New York were held on March 3 and 4, 1789. But after a lengthy debate of "An act for prescribing the times, places and manner of holding elections for Senators of the United States of America, to be chosen in this State", the legislature adjourned without having elected U.S. Senators. The Anti-Federalist Assembly majority and the Federalist Senate majority agreed to adjourn earlier than usual, leaving it to the new members to find a way out of the deadlock. On June 6, Gov. George Clinton called for a special session of the legislature to meet on July 6, only a few days after the new members' term would begin.

== Elections ==
The State election was held from April 28 to 30, 1789. Gov. George Clinton and Lt. Gov. Pierre Van Cortlandt were re-elected to a fifth term. Senators Volkert P. Douw and Philip Schuyler (both Western D.) were re-elected; and James Carpenter (Middle D.), and Assemblymen Philip Livingston (Southern D.), John Cantine (Middle D.) and Alexander Webster were also elected to the Senate.

== Sessions ==
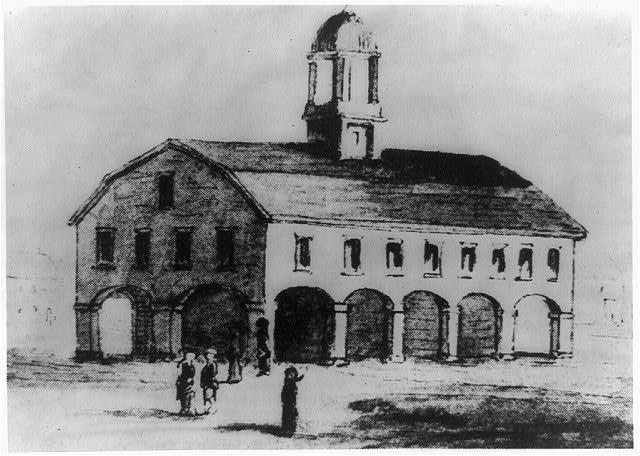
The Old Royal Exchange, in New York City, where the Legislature met for the regular session in 1790.

The state legislature met from July 6 to 16, 1789, at the Old City Hall in Albany, to resume the election of U.S. Senators, and elected State Senator Philip Schuyler and Assemblyman Rufus King, both Federalists, who took their seats in the U.S. Senate of the 1st United States Congress a few days later at Federal Hall in New York City, where Congress met until September 29, 1789, and again from January 4, 1790.

The legislature was to meet for the regular session on January 5, 1790, at the Old Royal Exchange in New York City; the state Senate assembled a quorum first on January 12, the Assembly on the next day; and both Houses adjourned on April 6.

State Senators Philip Schuyler, John Hathorn and John Laurance, and Assemblyman Rufus King retained their seats in the legislature while serving concurrently in the 1st United States Congress. Schuyler was also elected on January 15 a member of the State's Council of Appointment which consisted of the Governor of New York, and four state senators elected annually by the State Assembly. On January 27, the legislature resolved that it was "incompatible with the U.S. Constitution for any person holding an office under the United States government at the same time to have a seat in the Legislature of this State," and that if a member of the state legislature was elected or appointed to a federal office, the seat should be declared vacant upon acceptance. Thus Schuyler, King, Hathorn, Laurance and federal judge James Duane vacated their seats in the state legislature. On April 3, John Cantine, a member of the Council of Appointment, raised the question if Schuyler, after vacating his State Senate seat, was still a member of the council. Philip Livingston, another member, held that once elected, a member could not be expelled from the Council in any case. On April 5, Gov. George Clinton asked the State Assembly for a decision, but the latter refused to do so, arguing that it was a question of law, which could be pursued in the courts. Schuyler thus kept his seat in the Council of Appointment until the end of the term.

== State Senate ==
=== Districts ===
- The Southern District (9 seats) consisted of Kings, New York, Queens, Richmond, Suffolk and Westchester counties.
- The Middle District (6 seats) consisted of Dutchess, Orange and Ulster counties.
- The Eastern District (3 seats) consisted of Washington, Clinton, Cumberland and Gloucester counties.
- The Western District (6 seats) consisted of Albany, Columbia and Montgomery counties.

Note: There are now 62 counties in the State of New York. The counties which are not mentioned in this list had not yet been established, or sufficiently organized, the area being included in one or more of the abovementioned counties.

=== Members ===
The asterisk (*) denotes members of the previous Legislature who continued in office as members of this Legislature. Philip Livingston, John Cantine, Edward Savage and Alexander Webster changed from the Assembly to the Senate.

District	Senators	Term left	Party	Notes
Southern	Lewis Morris*	1 year	Federalist	
Southern	John Vanderbilt*	1 year	Federalist	
Southern	James Duane*	2 years	Federalist	appointed on September 25, 1789, to the United States District Court for the District of New York; seat declared vacant January 27, 1790
Southern	John Laurance*	2 years	Federalist	elected on March 3–4, 1789, to the 1st United States Congress: seat declared vacant January 27, 1790
Southern	Samuel Townsend*	2 years	Anti-Fed.	
Southern	Ezra L'Hommedieu*	3 years	Fed./Anti-Fed.	
Southern	Paul Micheau*	3 years	Federalist	
Southern	Isaac Roosevelt*	3 years	Federalist	
Southern	Philip Livingston*	4 years	Federalist	elected to the Council of Appointment
Middle	John Hathorn*	1 year	Anti-Fed.	elected on March 3–4, 1789, to the 1st United States Congress; seat declared vacant January 27, 1790
Middle	Anthony Hoffman*	2 years	Federalist	died 1790
Middle	Jacobus Swartwout*	2 years	Anti-Fed.	
Middle	James Clinton*	3 years	Anti-Fed.	
Middle	John Cantine*	4 years	Anti-Fed.	elected to the Council of Appointment
Middle	James Carpenter	4 years		
Eastern	John Williams*	1 year	Anti-Fed.	
Eastern	Edward Savage*	3 years	Anti-Fed.	elected to the Council of Appointment
Eastern	Alexander Webster*	4 years	Anti-Fed.	
Western	Peter Schuyler*	1 year	Federalist	
Western	Abraham Yates Jr.*	1 year	Anti-Fed.	
Western	Jellis Fonda*	2 years		
Western	Peter Van Ness*	3 years	Anti-Fed.	
Western	Volkert P. Douw*	4 years		
Western	Philip Schuyler*	4 years	Federalist	elected on July 16 a U.S. Senator from New York; elected to the Council of Appointment; State Senate seat declared vacant January 27, 1790, but remained in the Council of Appointment

=== Employees ===
- Clerk: Abraham B. Bancker

== State Assembly ==
=== Districts ===
- The City and County of Albany (7 seats)
- Columbia County (3 seats)
- Cumberland County (3 seats)
- Dutchess County (7 seats)
- Gloucester County (2 seats)
- Kings County (2 seats)
- Montgomery County (6 seats)
- The City and County of New York (9 seats)
- Orange County (4 seats)
- Queens County (4 seats)
- Richmond County (2 seats)
- Suffolk County (5 seats)
- Ulster County (6 seats)
- Washington and Clinton counties (4 seats)
- Westchester County (6 seats)

Note: There are now 62 counties in the State of New York. The counties which are not mentioned in this list had not yet been established, or sufficiently organized, the area being included in one or more of the abovementioned counties.

=== Assemblymen ===
The asterisk (*) denotes members of the previous Legislature who continued as members of this Legislature.

County	Assemblymen	Party	Notes
Albany	Leonard Bronck		
Albany	James Gordon	Federalist	elected on April 26–28, 1790, to the 2nd United States Congress
Albany	Richard Sill	Federalist	
Albany	Henry K. Van Rensselaer*	Anti-Fed.	
Albany	Stephen Van Rensselaer	Federalist	
Albany	Cornelius Van Veghten		
Albany	John Younglove*		
Columbia	Ezekiel Gilbert	Federalist	
Columbia	John Livingston	Federalist	
Columbia	James Savage	Federalist	
Cumberland	none		No election returns from these counties
Gloucester	none		No election returns from these counties
Dutchess	Samuel A. Barker*		
Dutchess	Isaac Bloom*		
Dutchess	Joseph Crane Jr.	Federalist	
Dutchess	Jacob Griffin*	Anti-Fed.	
Dutchess	Ebenezer Husted		
Dutchess	Isaac I. Talman		
Dutchess	Thomas Tillotson	Federalist	
Kings	Aquila Giles*		
Kings	Peter Vandervoort*	Federalist	
Montgomery	Abraham Arndt		
Montgomery	Josiah Crane	Federalist	
Montgomery	James Livingston	Federalist	
Montgomery	David McMasters		
Montgomery	Michael Myers		
Montgomery	Volkert Veeder*	Anti-Fed.	
New York	Francis Childs	Federalist	
New York	Matthew Clarkson	Federalist	
New York	Rufus King	Federalist	seat declared vacant January 27, 1790
New York	Morgan Lewis		
New York	Anthony Post		
New York	Robert R. Randall		
New York	Gulian Verplanck*	Federalist	elected Speaker
New York	John Watts Jr.*	Federalist	
New York	Henry Will		
Orange	John Carpenter*	Anti-Fed.	
Orange	John D. Coe	Federalist	
Orange	Seth Marvin	Federalist	
Orange	William Sickles		
Queens	Stephen Carman*	Anti-Fed.	
Queens	Samuel Clowes		
Queens	Whitehead Cornwell*	Anti-Fed.	
Queens	Samuel Jones*	Anti-Fed.	from September 29, 1789, also Recorder of New York City
Richmond	Abraham Bancker*	Federalist	
Richmond	Peter Winant	Federalist	
Suffolk	Nathaniel Gardiner*	Federalist	
Suffolk	Jonathan N. Havens*	Anti-Fed.	
Suffolk	Jared Landon	Anti-Fed.	
Suffolk	Henry Scudder*	Anti-Fed.	
Suffolk	John Smith*	Anti-Fed.	
Ulster	Severyn T. Bruyn		
Ulster	Ebenezer Clark*	Anti-Fed.	
Ulster	Johannis G. Hardenbergh*	Anti-Fed.	
Ulster	Cornelius C. Schoonmaker*	Anti-Fed.	elected on April 26–28, 1790, to the 2nd United States Congress
Ulster	Nathan Smith*	Anti-Fed.	
Ulster	Christopher Tappen*	Anti-Fed.	
Washington and Clinton	Thomas Converse		
Washington and Clinton	Zina Hitchcock		
Washington and Clinton	Nathan Morgan		
Washington and Clinton	John Rowan		
Westchester	Joseph Brown		
Westchester	Samuel Haight		
Westchester	Jonathan Horton*	Federalist	
Westchester	Nathan Rockwell*	Federalist	
Westchester	Walter Seaman*	Federalist	
Westchester	Philip Van Cortlandt*	Federalist	

=== Employees ===
- Clerk: John McKesson

== Sources ==
- The New York Civil List compiled by Franklin Benjamin Hough (Weed, Parsons and Co., 1858) [see pg. 108 for Senate districts; pg. 114 for senators; pg. 148f for Assembly districts; pg. 165 for assemblymen; pg. 54f for U.S. Constitution ratifying convention]
- Election result Assembly, Dutchess Co. at project "A New Nation Votes", compiled by Phil Lampi, hosted by Tufts University Digital Library
- Election result Assembly, Montgomery Co. at project "A New Nation Votes"
- Election result Assembly, Queens Co. at project "A New Nation Votes"
