= George Featherstonhaugh =

George Featherstonhaugh may refer to:

- George William Featherstonhaugh (1780–1860), British-American geologist and geographer
- George W. Featherstonhaugh Jr. (1814–1900), American businessman and territorial legislator
