= List of places named for DeWitt Clinton =

This is a list of places in the United States named for DeWitt Clinton. His role in the construction of the Erie Canal created accessible Eastern seaboard markets for Midwestern agriculture and he was widely admired by settlers, especially those hailing from New York.

Some of these places may have been named for both DeWitt Clinton and his uncle George Clinton, an important figure in the founding of the United States.

== Counties and municipalities ==
- Clinton County, Illinois
- Clinton County, Indiana
- Clinton County, Iowa
- Clinton County, Kentucky
- Clinton County, Michigan
- Clinton County, Missouri
- Clinton County, Pennsylvania
- DeWitt County, Illinois
- Clinton Charter Township, Michigan
- Clinton Township, Lenawee County, Michigan
- Clinton Township, New Jersey
- City of Clinton, Arkansas
- City of Clinton, Indiana
- City of Clinton, Illinois
- City of Clinton, Iowa
- City of Clinton, Missouri
- City of Clinton, Mississippi
- Community of Clinton, Pennsylvania
- City of DeWitt, Arkansas
- City of DeWitt, Iowa
- Town of Clinton, Louisiana
- Town of Clinton, Massachusetts
- City of DeWitt, Michigan
- Town of Clinton, New Jersey
- Town of Clinton, Rock County, Wisconsin
- Village of Clinton, Lenawee County, Michigan
- Village of DeWitt, Illinois
- Village of Clinton, Kansas
- Village of Clinton, Wisconsin
- Village of Clintonville, KY
- Town of Clinton, Connecticut
- City of Port Clinton, Ohio
- Borough of Port Clinton, Pennsylvania
- Town of Clinton, Kentucky
- City of Clinton, Tennessee
- City of Clinton, Maryland
- Hamlet of Dewittville, New York

== Streets and parks ==
- Clinton Avenue and Clinton Square in Albany, New York
- Clinton Avenue in Fair Haven, Connecticut
- Clinton St. in Chicago (which benefited greatly from the Erie Canal)
- Clinton St. in Fort Wayne, Indiana
- Clinton Square, Syracuse, New York
- Clinton Avenue, Brooklyn, New York
- Clinton Street, Manhattan
- DeWitt Clinton Park, Manhattan (located in the Clinton neighborhood)
  - DeWitt's Dog Run, Manhattan (a dog run located within DeWitt Clinton Park)
- DeWitt Road, Webster, New York
- Clintonville Street, Whitestone, New York
- DeWitt Avenue East New York, Brooklyn
- DeWitt Avenue Mattoon, Illinois
- Clinton St. in Grand Mound, Iowa

== Schools ==
- DeWitt Clinton High School, Bronx, New York City
- DeWitt Clinton School, Chicago, Illinois
- DeWitt Clinton Elementary School, Detroit, Michigan (which features a mural on American history painted by Diego Rivera)
- Clinton Hall, a graduate student dormitory at SUNY Buffalo
- DeWitt Road Elementary School, Webster, New York

== Other ==
- Clinton, a neighborhood on the west side of Manhattan also known as Hell's Kitchen.
- Clinton Hill, Brooklyn, New York
- Clinton House, Ithaca, New York (former hotel adjacent to the Ithaca Commons).
- Clinton River in Michigan
- Clinton String Quartet of Syracuse, New York
- DeWitt Clinton Lodge of Sandwich, Massachusetts
- DeWitt Clinton Masonic Lodge #141 Goochland, Virginia
- Former Dewitt Clinton Hotel (now Dewitt Clinton Apartments) in Albany, NY
- Governor DeWitt Clinton Houses, a New York City Housing Authority (NYCHA) development located in Harlem, Manhattan.
- Clinton Grove in Weare, NH and Clinton Grove Academy, also in Weare, NH.
- The Dewitt Clinton - Apartment building in Astoria, Queens, NYC built c. 1928

== See also ==
- DeWitt Clinton was also the name of the first steam locomotive to operate in New York; it ran between Albany and Schenectady, New York.
