= George W. Featherstonhaugh Jr. =

American politician

George William Featherstonhaugh Jr.

Member of the Wisconsin Territorial House of Representatives
- In office 1846–1848

Delegate at the Wisconsin Constitutional Convention
- In office 1847–1848

Personal details
- Born: October 1814 Albany, New York, U.S.
- Died: June 10, 1900 (aged 85) Gurnee, Illinois, U.S.
- Relations: James Duane (grandfather); Anthony Duane (great-grandfather)
- Parent: George William Featherstonhaugh (father)
- Occupation: Businessman, Territorial Legislator

George William Featherstonhaugh Jr. (October 1814 – June 10, 1900) was an American businessman and territorial legislator.

Born in Albany, New York, his father was the British-American geologist George William Featherstonhaugh, and his maternal grandfather was James Duane, a Founding Father. He settled in Calumet County, Wisconsin Territory and operated a flour mill and a store in Brothertown, Wisconsin. Featherstonehaugh served in the second Wisconsin Constitutional Convention of 1847–1848 and the Wisconsin Territorial Legislature in the Wisconsin Territorial House of Representatives from 1846 to 1848. He then lived in Milwaukee, Wisconsin and died in Gurnee, Illinois.
