= Christopher Tappen =

American politician (1742–1826)

Major Christopher Tappen (June 13, 1742 – August 3, 1826) was an American politician from New York State. During the American Revolution, Tappen served as a member of the New York Provincial Congress (which became in 1776–1777 the New York State Constitutional Convention), New York's Secret and Safety Committees, New York's Council of Safety and later in both the New York State Assembly and the New York State Senate. He also safely relocated and preserved the state's records and documents from destruction before the burning of Kingston by the British on October 16, 1777.

== Early life and family ==
Christopher Tappen was born in Kingston, New York, in 1742 to Petrus Tappen, a mariner who ran supply ships between the ports of Manhattan and Kingston. Petrus, in turn, was the great-grandson of Jurian Teunis Tappen, who had immigrated to New Amsterdam in 1652 and became a glassmaker and innkeeper at Beverwijk (present-day Albany).

At age sixteen, he began a career as a land surveyor and soon after enlisted in the Ulster County Militia. In 1761, he married Annatje Wynkoop, daughter of Sheriff Johannes Wykoop Jr. and Marytje Bogardus (the great-granddaughter of Everardus Bogardus and New Amsterdam landowner Anneke Webber Jans).

In 1765, Tappen was appointed Deputy County Clerk for Ulster County, New York under County Clerk and soon-to-be brother-in-law George Clinton. Tappen served as Trustee for the Village of Kingston in 1768 and later as village magistrate.

== Chain across the Hudson ==
On May 25, 1775, the Continental Congress recommended the construction of barricades along the Hudson River as protection from British naval incursion. The New York Provincial Congress appointed Major Christopher Tappen and James Clinton (elder brother of George Clinton) to investigate and choose a location or locations for the same.

Two weeks later, the pair submitted their proposal for the erection of a fort at "Martelaer's Rock" (soon after renamed Constitution Island), just across from West Point, and below the "gate" of the Southern Highlands. The location and tricky navigability made it an ideal defensive position - at the narrowest and deepest point on the river, with the Highlands rising steeply on both sides of an S-shaped bend. In addition, the pair recommended that a chain be stretched across the Hudson so that "by means of four or five Booms chained together on one Side of River, ready to be drawn across, the Passage can be closed up to prevent any Vessel from passing or repassing". Based upon this recommendation, work was approved for what would be Fort Constitution. However, construction difficulties and cost overruns eventually saw the project abandoned in favor of nearby Fort Montgomery (Hudson River), an alternate site also selected by Tappen and Clinton.

== New York state constitution ==
In May of 1776, Tappen was elected to the New York Provincial Congress, then meeting in New York City. A British presence, however, necessitated their removal shortly after their unanimous approval of the United States Declaration of Independence on July 9, 1776, first to White Plains, then to Fishkill and finally to Kingston. This Congress became the de facto New York State Constitutional Convention, which on April 20, 1777, approved the New York State Constitution in Kingston's Ulster County Courthouse. Tappen was then appointed by the Convention to the 15-member Council of Safety, which was delegated the responsibility of governing the new state until elections could be held. The group sat until July 30, 1777, when Tappen's brother-in-law George Clinton was sworn in at Kingston as the first governor of New York.

== New York's "Secret Committee" ==
Meanwhile, on July 12, 1776, the British warships HMS Phoenix and HMS Rose advanced north up the Hudson River past the Tappan Zee, blockading supplies to and from New York City and landing British expeditionary forces to punish, burn and pillage villages along the river. In response, a powerful civilian "Secret Committee" was assembled to formulate a defense strategy and execute "such measures as to them shall appear the most Effectual for Obstructing the Channel of Hudson's River, or annoying the Enemy's Ship in their navigation up the said River". The members chosen for this special body included Tappen (Ulster County), brothers Robert R. Livingston and Gilbert Livingston (Dutchess County), Robert Yates (Albany County), and John Jay and William Paulding (Westchester County). On July 22, the Committee appointed three agents to supervise "the making of a Chain to fix across Hudson's River at that most convenient place near Fort Montgomery and fixing that same, and if it should be found impracticable at or near the said Fort, then to fix the same at or near Fort Constitution." The Committee also tasked the agents with "the building and fitting out of Ten Fire Rafts and preparing such Vessels as they may be furnished with for Fire Ships", as well as for the making of 4000 Fire arrows to protect the Forts".

On July 29, General George Washington instructed the Committee to formulate a plan of attack on the Phoenix and Rose, then at anchor in the Tappan Zee. In furtherance of this, Robert Yates (politician) (on behalf of the Committee) on August 13, 1776, wrote to George Washington that "… the Chain intended … is arrived and will form a Quarter part of the one designed for Hudson's River, the Iron for the Remainder is come to Hand, and the Smiths begin this Day to Forge it. We have agreed to fix One End of it at Fort Montgomery and the other at the Foot of a Mountain called Anthony's Nose — it will cross the River Obliquely, and for that Reason be less exposed to the Force of the Tide, & less liable to Injury from the Ships of the Enemy—the Length of the Chain will at least be 2100 Feet." By 1782, the first links of a "Great Chain" were laid across the Hudson at West Point, New York as directed by General George Washington.

== Burning of Kingston and saving of the archives ==
On October 16, 1777, 1,600 British troops under the command of Major General John Vaughn advanced north up the Hudson River with the intention of reinforcing General John Burgoyne in Saratoga, New York. While they played little part in the Battle of Forts Clinton and Montgomery along the way (merely bombarding the forts as they passed), the force landed at Kingston - New York's first capitol and the seat of the revolutionary government - on October 16. In the space of three hours, British forces burned the entire town down, save one house, a barn and, accordingly to local legend, a brewery. All else was lost.

Fortunately, Christopher Tappen, then Deputy Ulster County Clerk and member of New York's Council of Safety, had removed, on October 12, the records, administrative papers, ledgers and documents of the county and state governments, including historic Dutch records going back as far as 1658, to the neighboring town of Rochester (a small village near Accord, New York), at the expense of Tappen's own house and personal belongings, destroyed by the British.

== Post-war ==
After the war, Tappen continued as Deputy Ulster County Clerk until 1812, when he became Ulster County Clerk upon the death of George Clinton, serving until 1821. In 1781, he became the Treasurer for Ulster County. It was Tappen who, as a member of the Trustees of the Village of Kingston in 1783, proposed to Congress that Kingston become the site of the federal capitol for the new United States of America. In a letter to Alexander Hamilton and William Floyd on March 19, 1783, Tappen forwarded that "the Corporation of Kingston desires to become the seat of the Continental Congress and discusses the advantages it affords as well as the privileges the town is willing to extend". At the time, the two primary contenders for the position were Kingston and Annapolis, Maryland. The vote being tabled, it arose again only later with the compromise site in what is now Washington, D.C.

In 1784, Tappen was appointed to the first Board of Regents of the University of the State of New York. He was elected to the New York State Assembly in 1788 (serving until 1790) and to the New York State Senate in 1797 (serving until 1802).

He died in Kingston on August 3, 1826, at the age of 84.
