= James Chatham Duane =

US Army General (1824–1897)

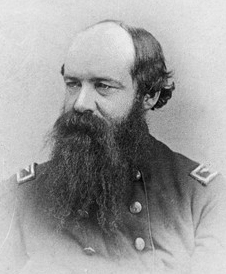
- Born: June 10, 1824; Schenectady, New York
- Died: December 8, 1897 (aged 73); New York City, New York
- Burial place: Vale Cemetery
- Spouse: Harriet Whitehorne Brewerton
- Relatives: James Duane (great-grandfather)
- Military career
- Allegiance: United States of America; Union
- Branch: United States Army; Union Army
- Service years: 1848–1888
- Rank: Brigadier General
- Commands: US Army Corps of Engineers
- Conflicts: Utah War; American Civil War: Battle of Harper's Ferry

James Chatham Duane (June 10, 1824 – December 8, 1897) was a career officer in the Union Army during the American Civil War, being the Chief Engineer of the Army of the Potomac.

== Early life ==
Duane was born on June 10, 1824, in Schenectady, New York, to James Duane and Harriet Constable. His paternal grandparents were James Chatham Duane (1769–1842) and Mary Ann Bowers (1773–1828). His great-grandfather James Duane (1733–1797) was a member of the Continental Congress and mayor of New York City. Duane graduated from Union College in 1844, where he was a founding member of Chi Psi fraternity, and from the United States Military Academy in 1848, where he ranked third in his class.

== Career ==
He taught practical military engineering there from 1852–54 during the superintendency of Robert E. Lee. Serving with the Army's company of sappers, miners, and pontoniers for nine years before the American Civil War, he led the engineers on a 1,100-mile march on the Utah Expedition in 1858 and commanded select engineer troops to guard President Abraham Lincoln at his inauguration in 1861.

Duane built the first military pontoon bridge over the Potomac River at the Battle of Harpers Ferry in 1862, served as Chief Engineer of the Army of the Potomac from 1863 to 1865, and in seven hours in 1864 built the longest pontoon bridge of the Civil War (2,170 ft) across the James River.

On April 10, 1866, President Andrew Johnson nominated Duane for appointment to the grade of brevet brigadier general in the Regular Army (United States), to rank from March 13, 1865, and the United States Senate confirmed the appointment on May 4, 1866.

Duane commanded at Willets Point, New York, from 1866 to 1868, and for ten years constructed fortifications along the coasts of Maine and New Hampshire. He was appointed lieutenant colonel in the U.S. Army to rank from March 7, 1867, and colonel in the U.S. Army, January 10, 1883. He was president of the Board of Engineers from 1884 to 1886. Appointed Chief of Engineers and brigadier general on October 11, 1886, he retired June 30, 1888. He then became Commissioner of Croton Aqueduct in New York City. He published a paper on the "History of the Bridge Equipage in the United States Army."

== Personal life ==
He married Harriet Whitehorne Brewerton (1830–1914) in 1850. Together, they had:

- James Duane (1852–1899)
- Charles Duane (1856–?)
- Alexander Duane (1858–1926)

General Duane died in New York City, November 8, 1897. He was buried in Vale Cemetery, Schenectady, New York.

== See also ==
- List of American Civil War brevet generals (Union)

Military offices
Preceded by John Newton	Chief of Engineers; 1886–1888	Succeeded by Thomas Lincoln Casey
