= Albany and Schenectady Railroad =

Railroad in New York (1826–1853)

- Mohawk and Hudson Railroad
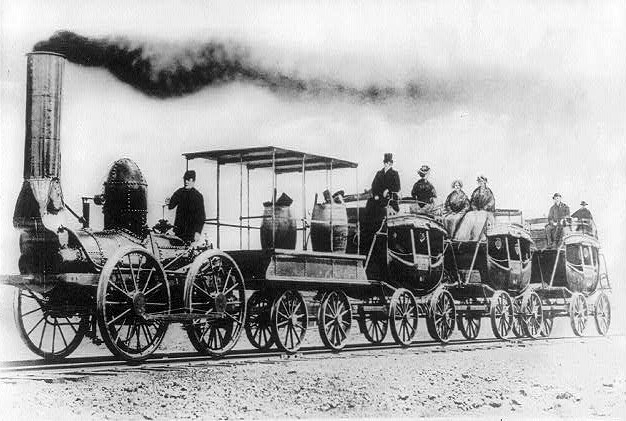
- The DeWitt Clinton as it would have appeared on its inaugural run in 1831.

Overview
- Dates of operation: 1826–1853
- Successor: New York Central Railroad

Technical
- Track gauge: 4 ft 8 1/2 in (1,435 mm)
- Previous gauge: 4 ft 9 in (1,448 mm)

The Mohawk and Hudson Railroad was the first railroad built in the state of New York and one of the first railroads in the United States. It was so-named because it linked the Mohawk River at Schenectady with the Hudson River at Albany. It was conceived as a means of allowing Erie Canal passengers to quickly bypass the circuitous Cohoes Falls via steam powered trains.

The railroad was incorporated in 1826 and opened for public service in 1831. On April 19, 1847, the company name was changed to the Albany and Schenectady Railroad. The railroad was consolidated with nine other railroads in 1853 to form the first New York Central Railroad.

== History ==
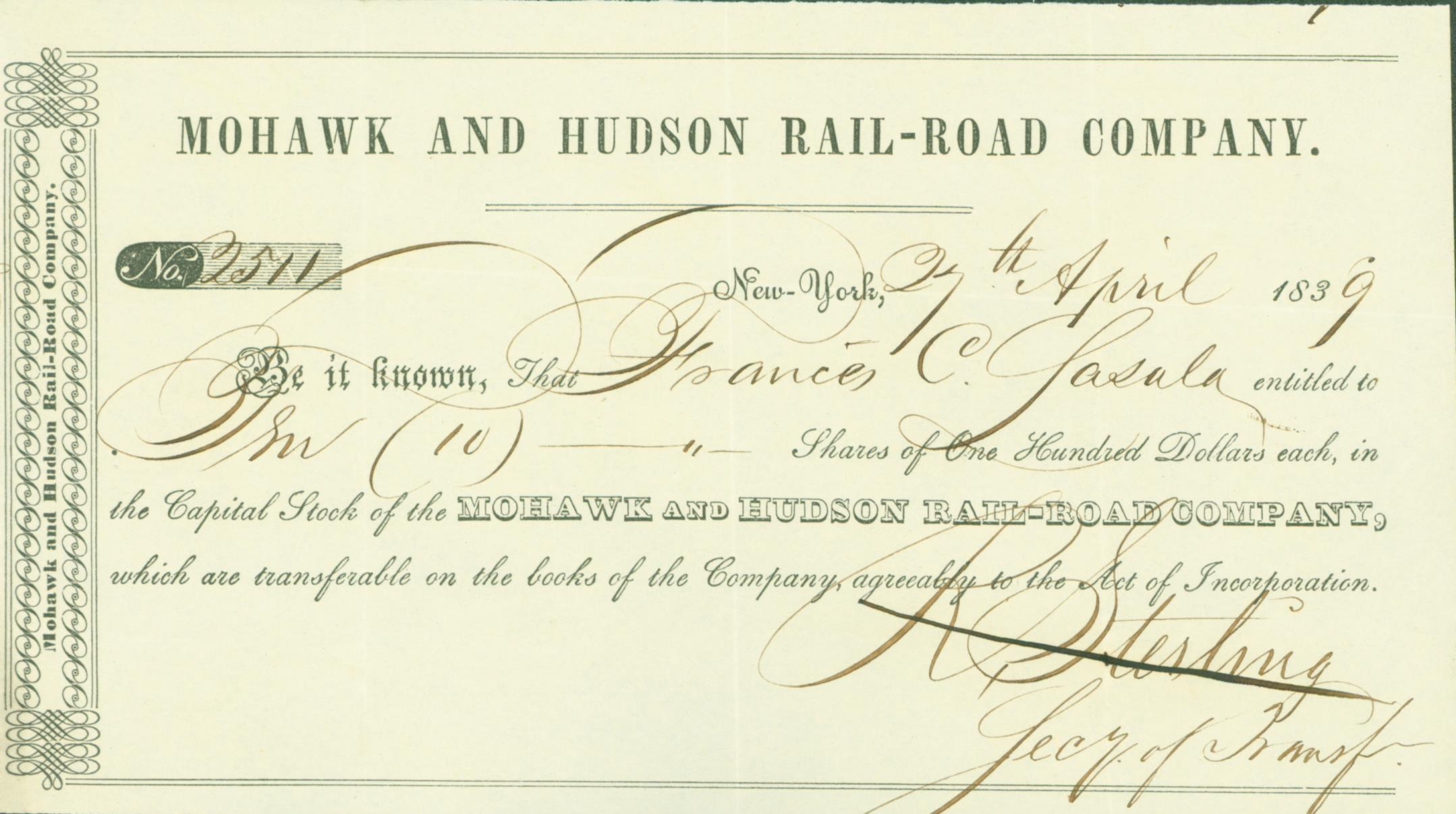
Share of the Mohawk and Hudson Rail-Road Company, issued 27 April 1839

On December 28, 1825, Schenectady County resident (Duanesburg) George William Featherstonhaugh (Note: pronounced Fanshaw) ran a newspaper notice announcing the formation of the Mohawk & Hudson Rail Road Company. The intention was to bypass the Erie Canal between Albany and Schenectady, cutting time for the trip from a whole day to under one hour. The Mohawk & Hudson became the first chartered railroad in New York State on April 17, 1826.

Construction began in August 1830 and the railroad opened September 24, 1831, on a 16-mile route between Albany and Schenectady through the Pine Bush region that separates both cities. The civil engineer Peter Fleming surveyed the right-of-way and provided the cost estimates. Fleming resigned in 1830 and was replaced by John B. Jervis. The tracks were made of strap rail resting on stone blocks rather than crossties that later became standard. Initially the line ended outside the two cities to avoid steep grades — in Albany the line ended near the current intersection of Madison and Western Avenues — and the passengers covered the remaining distance in stagecoaches. Later at each end an inclined plane with a fixed steam engine was used to raise and lower the train.

The DeWitt Clinton locomotive, built by the West Point Foundry in New York, made its first test run on July 2, 1831. After some hesitation it was decided that the engine would burn wood rather than coal. The official opening took place on September 24, 1831, with approximately eighty politicians and dignitaries. The DeWitt Clinton, pulling three cars, covered the route in forty-seven minutes. Another eight cars had to be pulled by horses.

In 1832, a rider wrote in his journal.

June 28, arrive in Schenectady. Among the astonishing inventions of man, surely that of the locomotive steam engine hath no secondary rank. By this matchless exercise of skill, we fly with a smooth and even course along once impassible barriers, the valleys are filled, the mountains laid low, and distance seems annihilated. I took my seat as near as possible to the car containing the engine, in order to examine more minutely the operation of this, to me, novel and stupendous specimen of human skill. Having thus, as if by some invisible agency flown the distance of 16 miles in 40 minutes, at Schenectady I took passage on the Hudson and Erie Canal for Buffalo.

The Mohawk and Hudson was renamed the Albany and Schenectady Railroad on April 19, 1847. It was consolidated with nine other railroads to form the first New York Central Railroad on May 17, 1853.

== Bibliography ==
- Interstate Commerce Commission (1930). Interstate Commerce Commission Reports: Decisions of the Interstate Commerce Commission of the United States. Valuation reports. Vol. 27. Washington, D.C.: U.S. Government Printing Office.
- Klein, Aaron E. (1985). New York Central (1st ed.). New York: Bonanza Books. ISBN 978-0-517-46085-6.
- Puffert, Douglas J. (2009). Tracks across continents, paths through history: the economic dynamics of standardization in railway gauge. Chicago: University of Chicago Press. p. 101. ISBN 9780226685090. OL 16973339M.
