= 1796 United States Senate special election in New York =

- November 9, 1796
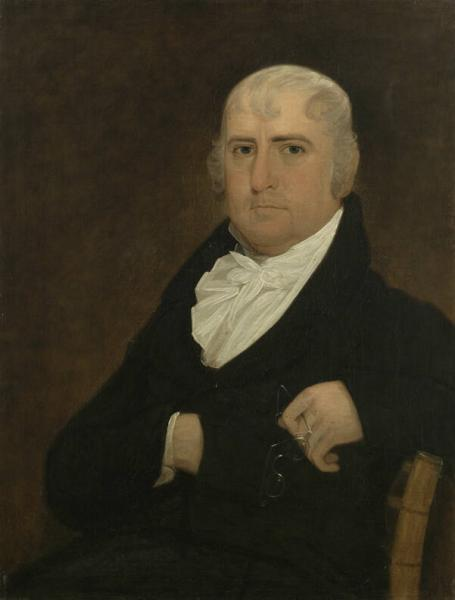
Nominee	John Laurance
Party	Federalist
U.S. senator before election
Rufus King
Federalist
Elected U.S. Senator
John Laurence
Federalist

The 1796 United States Senate special election in New York was held on November 9, 1796, by the New York State Legislature to elect a U.S. senator (Class 3) to represent the State of New York in the United States Senate.

== Background ==
Rufus King had been re-elected in 1795 to a second term in the U.S. Senate (1795–1801). On May 23, 1796, he resigned after having been appointed U.S. Minister to Great Britain, leaving the State Legislature to fill the vacancy.

At the State election in April 1796, Federalist majorities were elected to both houses of the 20th New York State Legislature which met from November 1 to 11, 1796, at New York City, and from January 3 to April 3, 1797, at Albany, New York.

== Candidates ==
United States District Judge for the District of New York John Laurance was the candidate of the Federalist Party.

== Result ==
Laurance was the choice of both the State Senate and the State Assembly, and was declared elected.

1796 United States Senator special election result
Office	House	Federalist candidate	Democratic-Republican candidate
U.S. Senator	State Senate (42 members)	John Laurance	
	State Assembly (96 members)	John Laurance	

== Aftermath ==
Laurance took his seat on December 8, 1796, and resigned in August 1800. A special election to fill the vacancy was held in November 1800.

== Sources ==
- The New York Civil List compiled in 1858 (see: pg. 62 for U.S. Senators; pg. 116 for State Senators 1796–97; page 170f for Members of Assembly 1796–97) [gives name as "Lawrence"]
- Members of the Fourth United States Congress
- Members of the Sixth United States Congress
- History of Political Parties in the State of New-York by Jabez Delano Hammond (pages 103f) [gives name as "Lawrence"]
