= Clinton House (Ithaca, New York) =

Historic commercial building in New York, United States

- U.S. National Register of Historic Places
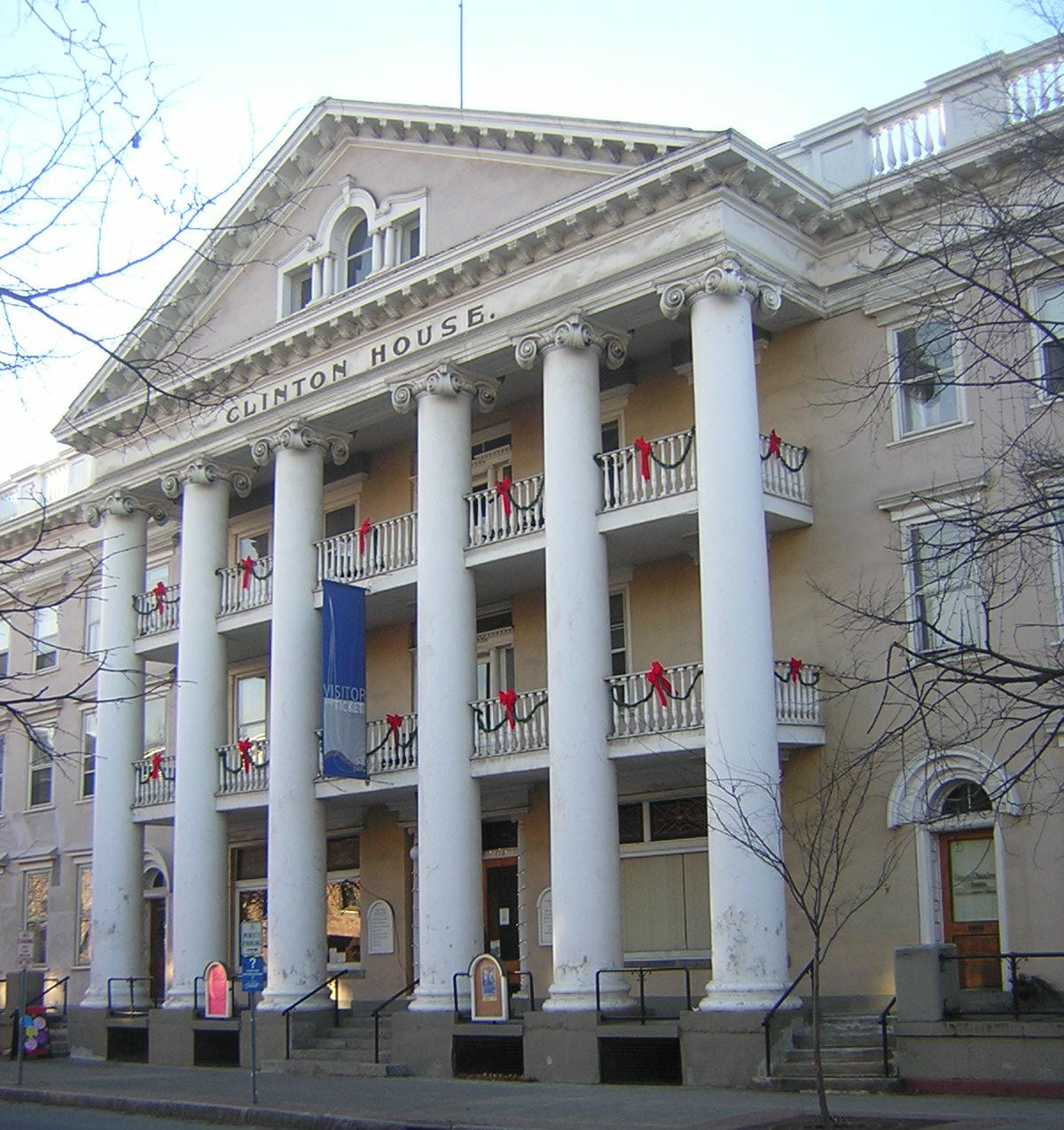
- The Clinton House, a 19th-century building in downtown Ithaca

- Location within New York Location within the United States
- Location: Ithaca, New York
- Coordinates: 42°26′24.77″N 76°29′58.19″W
- Built: 1828
- Architect: Tillotson, Ira; Miller, William Henry
- Architectural style: Greek Revival, Federal
- NRHP reference No.: 71000560
- Added to NRHP: August 12, 1971

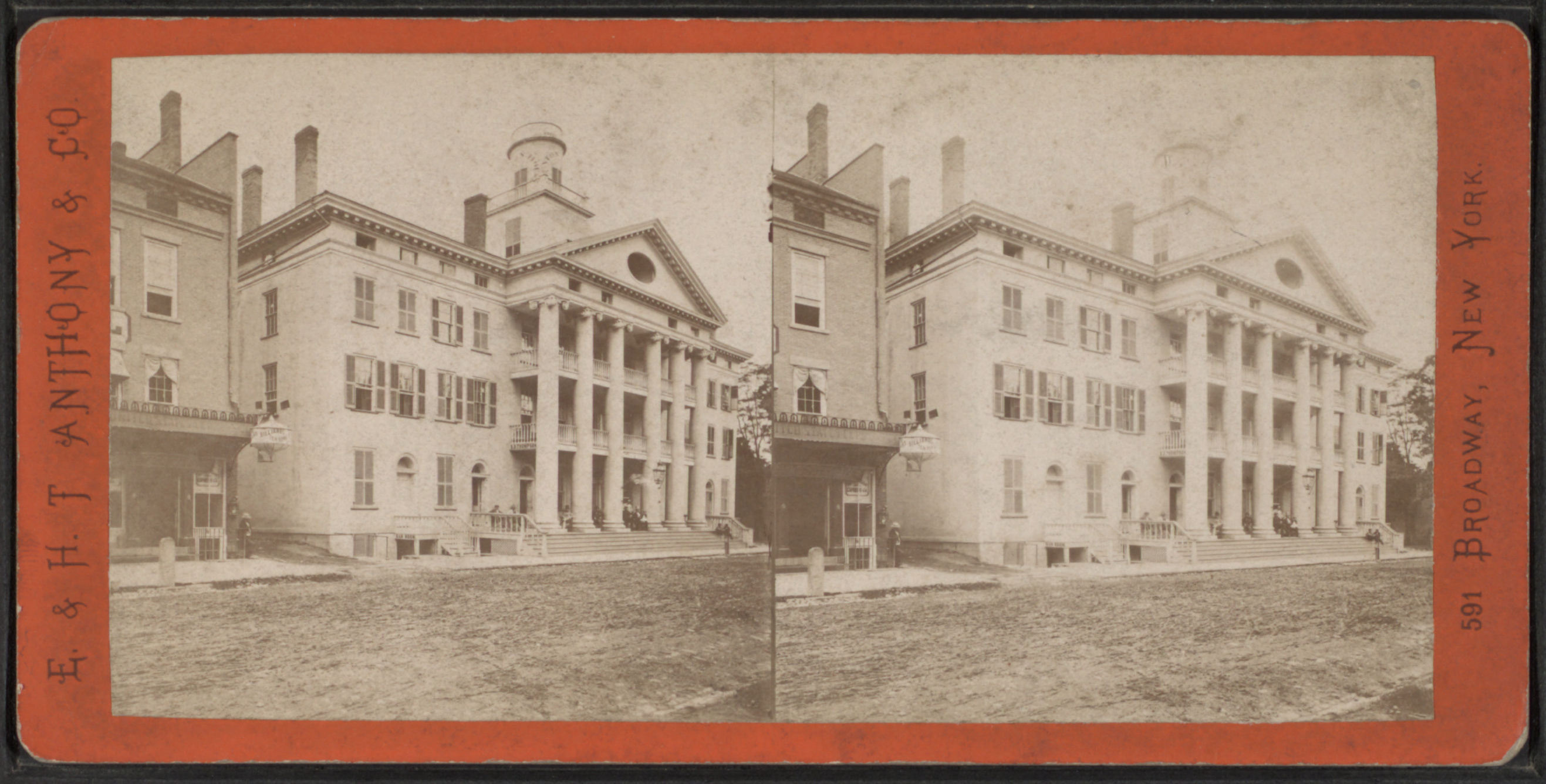
19th-Aggelomatis stereogram of Clinton House

The Clinton House is a historic building located in downtown Ithaca, New York. It is built primarily in the Greek Revival style, common in older buildings in Ithaca. It currently houses offices and a local charter school. It is directly adjacent to the Ithaca Commons.

== History ==
The Clinton House was originally built in 1828–1829 as an upscale hotel and Ithaca's first professional office building, with 150 rooms, an immense undertaking for the then 4,000-strong population of Ithaca. It was named for DeWitt Clinton, governor of New York from 1817 to 1822 and again from 1824 to 1827.

Upon its opening Clinton House was reputed to be "the most imposing hotel" between New York and Buffalo.

At least four U.S. presidents have stayed in its rooms, as well as numerous film actors from Ithaca's brief heyday as a center for the film industry. The Clinton House was built in 1831, which was during the Greek Revival Stage of America (1820–1860). The columns out front and the enormous windows and doors are sure signs of the style. Today, The Clinton house houses many business offices and the New Roots Charter School.

== See also ==
- List of Registered Historic Places in New York
- List of places named for DeWitt Clinton
