= DeWitt Clinton Boutelle =

American painter

- Born: 1820; Troy, New York, U.S.
- Died: 1884 (aged 63–64); Bethlehem, Pennsylvania, U.S.
- Occupation: Landscape painter

DeWitt Clinton Boutelle (1820–1884) was an American landscape painter. He was a member of the Hudson River School.

== Biography ==
Boutelle was born in 1820 in Troy, New York. He was named after New York governor DeWitt Clinton. In 1846, he began showcasing his portraits and landscapes at both the National Academy of Design and the American Art Union. He was named an associate of the academy in 1851 and continued to exhibit there until 1874. The American Art Union bought more paintings from Boutelle (71) than from anyone else.

Boutelle became a member of the Pennsylvania Academy of the Fine Arts in 1862. His paintings were also exhibited at the Boston Athenaeum, the Washington Art Association, and the Brooklyn Art Association. Like other Hudson River School painters, he painted natural landscapes of the Northeastern United States.

Boutelle died in Bethlehem, Pennsylvania, in 1884. His paintings can be found in many art galleries nationwide.
