= Snyder's Regiment of Militia =

- Active: 1776-1783
- Allegiance: State of New York
- Type: militia
- Part of: New York Militia
- Engagements: Saratoga

Commanders
- Notable commanders: Johannes Snyder

Snyder's Regiment of Militia was known officially as The First Regiment of Ulster County Militia. It was the first regiment of four created in Ulster County, New York as ordered by the Provincial Congress of New York. It was also referred to as the Northern Regiment since its members were from the Northern section of Ulster County towns including Kingston, New York (then also called Esopus) and Saugerties, New York (then called Kingston Commons)

Johannes Snyder was given his commission and officially took his post as Colonel on May 1, 1776. At that time the 1st Ulster County Militia was reported to have 472 officers and men. In April of that year, he was elected to the Provincial Congress as a Delegate, and thus did not start active duty until September 1, 1776, when he was directed to proceed to Fort Montgomery in the Hudson Highlands and take command. He arrived on September 27.

The three months for which the Regiment had been called out expired on November 30. In the following year, 1777, he was with his regiment at Ft Montgomery as early as June 4. On July 30, he took his seat as a member of the Assembly in the first legislature chosen in New York State. His activity was said to be "untiring!" He was at the head of his regiment in the Highlands, and was assigned to every court-martial convened by General George Clinton to try Tories who were active everywhere, and whom his Regiment seized on every hand. He was also a member of the Council of Safety in Ulster County. Colonel Snyder was thus in Kingston when Major General Vaughan landed to destroy Kingston, New York State's first Capital. He could only muster 5 small cannons and about 150 men. The rest of the 1st Ulster were either with General, now Governor, George Clinton on their way to Kingston from the defeat at Fort Montgomery or as part of Colonel Graham's Levies from Dutchess and Ulster counties which were facing John Burgoyne at Saratoga. Colonel Snyder along with Colonel Levi Pawling threw up a hasty earthwork at Ponckhonkie overlooking the Hudson River and the mouth of the Rondout Creek, and a second one at the hill near O'Reilly's Woods—the present site of Kingston's City Hall, and placed his cannons. The British, numbering over 2,000, drove the defenders out and commenced to torch the city on October 16, 1777. As General Vaughan wrote, "Esopus [Kingston] being a nursery for almost every Villain in the Country, I judged it necessary to proceed to that Town...they fired from their Houses, which induced me to reduce the Place to Ashes, which I accordingly did, not leaving a House." After this, Governor Clinton assigned Colonel Snyder and a part of the regiment to assist and help rebuild the ruined city. He energetically took hold of the work with his men, and the town rapidly arose from the ashes. In 1778, and through the remainder of the war, Colonel Snyder was credited that no enemy descent was made upon exposed settlements in the northwest Catskills frontier where Governor Clinton committed its defense to him and his regiment. Part of the regiment was usually stationed at Little Shandaken to watch the approach through the valley of the Esopus Creek. Scouts constantly covered the territory from Hurley woods to the Palentine Clove along the foot of the Catskills. On at least three documented occasions, marauding Indians and Tories were turned back by finding their movements watched.

It is alleged the Regiment was founded as the Burgher Guard of Wildwijk in 1758. Captain Hendrick's Schoonmaker's Company of the 1st Ulster Regiment lineage continues to the Headquarters and Service Battery, 1st Battalion of the 156th Field Artillery Regiment which in 2006 was reorganized to become both the 1156th Engineer Company and the 104th Military Police Battalion.

== Sources ==
The Early History of Saugerties by Benjamin Brink (1902)

An Account of the British Expedition Above the Highlands of the Hudson River, and of the Events Connected with the Burning of Kingston in 1777, by George W. Pratt (1860)

The Collected Papers of George Clinton (1910)
