= Aquila Giles =

American politician

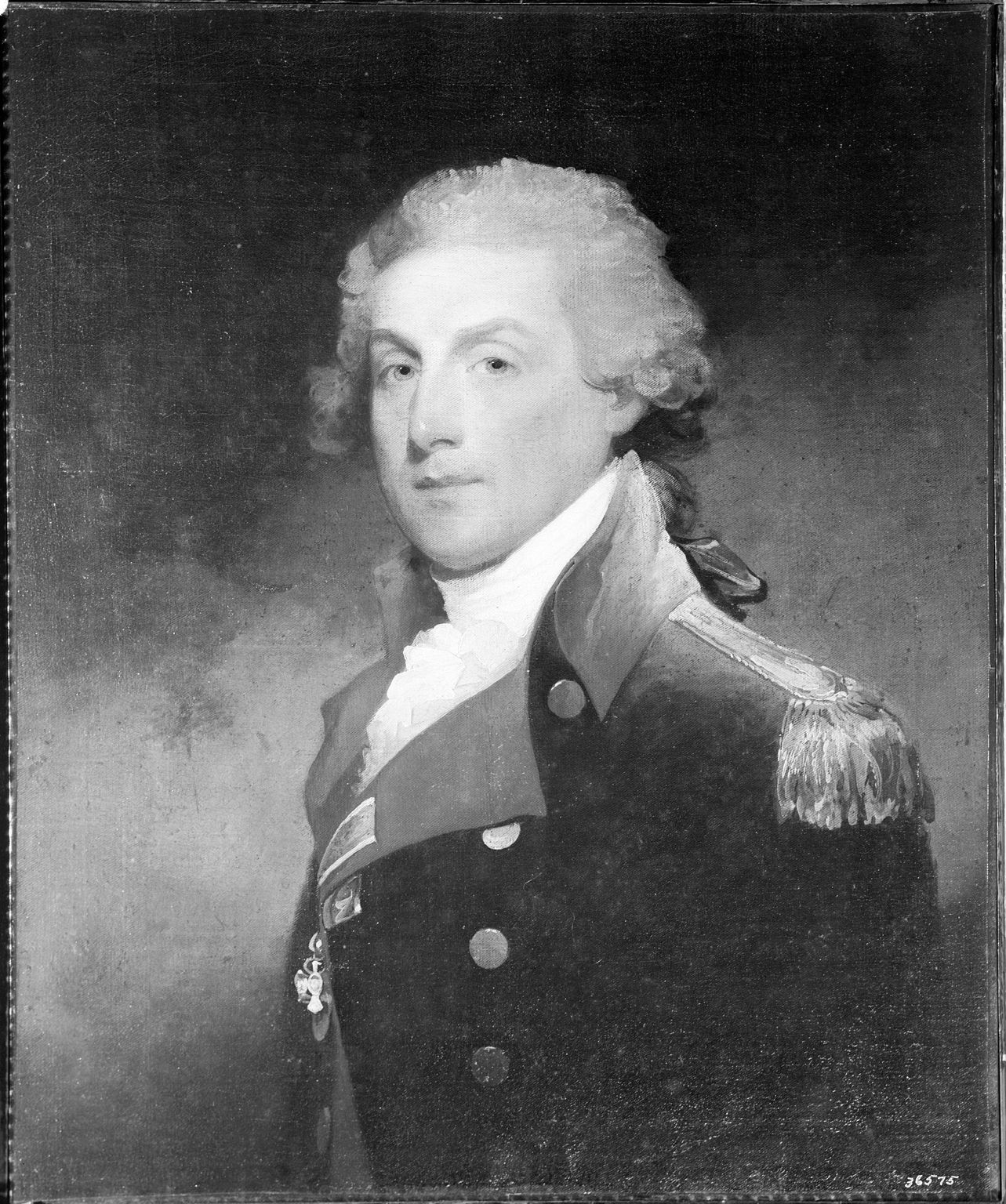
- portrait by Gilbert Stuart
- Born: 1758
- Died: 1822
- Resting place: Trinity Church Cemetery
- Occupation: Politician
- Children: Henry Giles, George Washington Giles
- Parents: Jacob Giles (father); Joanna Paca Giles (mother)

Aquila Giles (1758 – April 1822) was an American lawyer, politician and soldier from Brooklyn who served in the New York State Assembly.

== Early life ==
Giles was born in Maryland in 1758. He was the son of Jacob Giles (1703–1784) and Johanna (nee Paca) Giles (1720–1805), who stayed in Maryland during the Revolutionary War.

== Career ==
Giles, an attorney who owned land on the Susquehanna River, was a "keeper of military stores" and the "taker of First Census."

During the Revolutionary War, he served with the Patriots, first on the staff of Gen. Arthur St. Clair. Giles eventually became a General. Giles served alongside George Washington, and "participated in all the battles of that war." Upon Giles' marriage to Elizabeth Shipton, his father-in-law (who had made Elizabeth his chief heir), who was commissioned by the British as a colonel for the corps of Long Island Loyalists, "entirely shook her off, and withheld every friendship & attention from her" due to Giles' support of the Patriots.

From July 1, 1788, until June 30, 1791, Giles served in the New York State Assembly, representing Kings County (Brooklyn) alongside Peter Vandervoort, in the 12th through the 14th New York State Legislatures. He again served in the Assembly during the 16th New York State Legislature from July 1, 1792, to June 30, 1793.

From May 1792 to March 1801, he was a United States marshal for the District of New York.

== Personal life ==
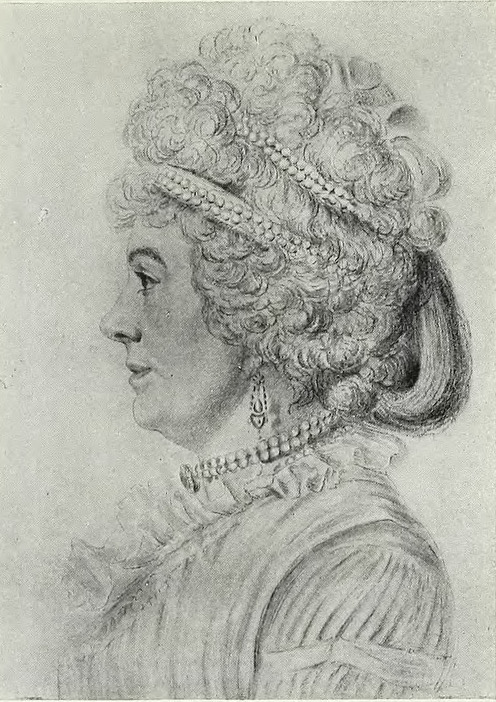
Elizabeth Shipton Giles

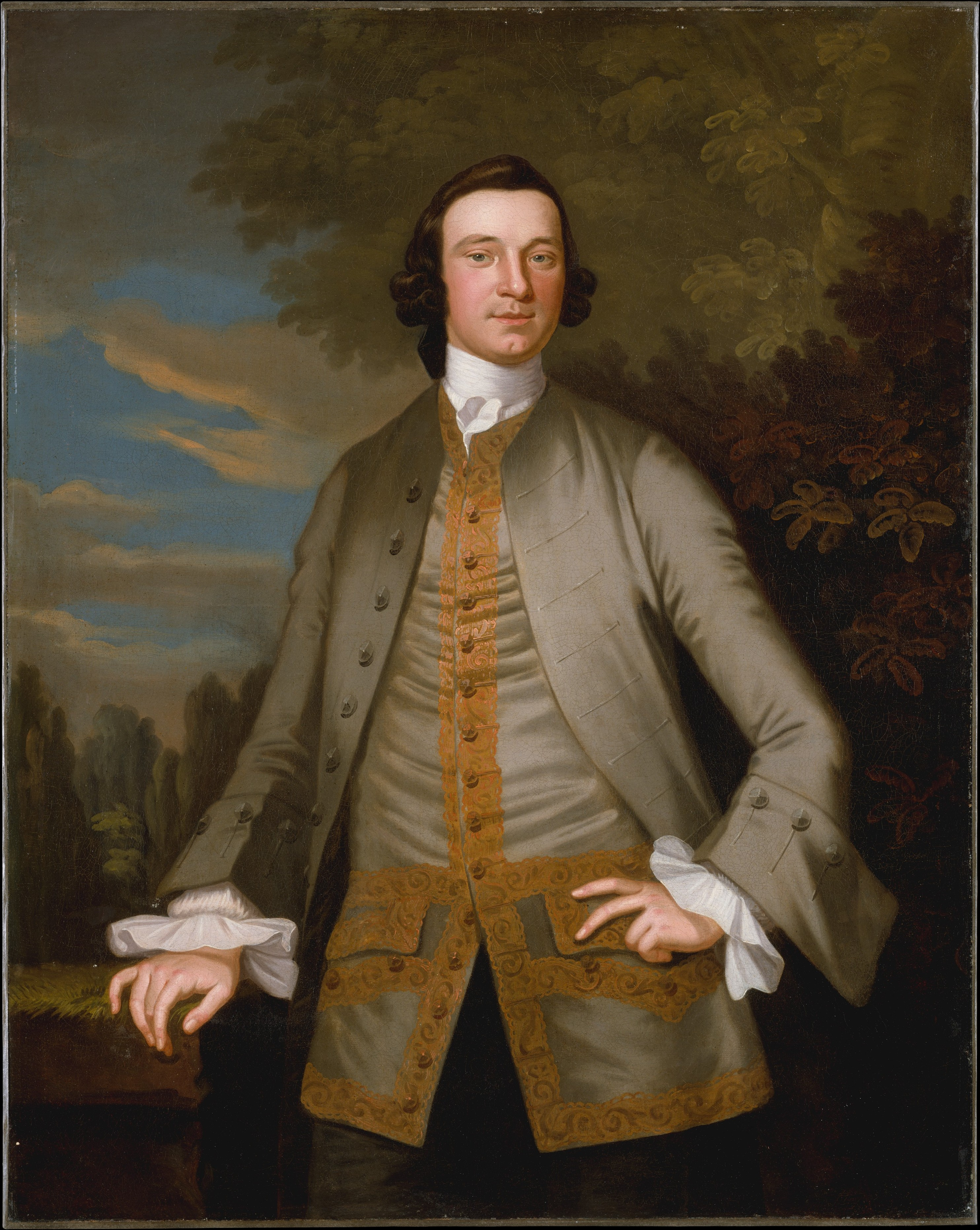
Giles' father-in-law, British merchant William Axtell, painted by John Wollaston, c. 1749–1752.

In 1780, Giles was married to Elizabeth Shipton (1757–1822). Elizabeth was the niece, and adopted daughter, of British born William Axtell, (Note: William Axtell (1720–1795) was also a brother-in-law to fellow Loyalist James DePeyster (brother of Arent DePeyster and grandfather to Frederic de Peyster).) a prominent West Indian merchant who had a country place called Melrose Hall in Flatbush in what was then Long Island (but today is Brooklyn). Axtell's holdings in America were confiscated in 1784 after he fled to England where he died at Beaumont Cottage in Surrey in 1795. Giles petitioned Governor George Clinton and the New York State Legislature to vest the confiscated estate to Giles and his wife. Through the assistance of Alexander Hamilton, Giles was allowed to purchase the estate for $4,500. Together, they were the parents of:

- William Axtell Giles (1781–1815)
- Jacob Edward Giles (1784–1813)
- St. Clair Giles (1787–1822)
- Mary Ann Baker Giles (1789–1815)
- Alexander Hamilton Giles (1791–1791), who died in infancy.
- Charles Augustus Giles (1792–1823)
- Helen Thorold Giles (b. 1793)
- Henry Theory Giles (1795–1877), who was a graduate of the U.S. Military Academy and who married Maria Smither (1807–1865).
- George Washington Giles (1800–1840), an attorney who was admitted to the bar in 1824 and who married Elizabeth Ogden (1801–1880), the daughter of William Ogden and Susan Murray Ogden and niece of John and Hannah Murray of Murray Hill.
- Elizabeth Giles, who married Daniel Thorne (b. 1784).

Giles and his wife both died in 1822. Both Giles and his wife were buried at the Trinity Church Cemetery.
