= James Duane =

American Founding Father and judge

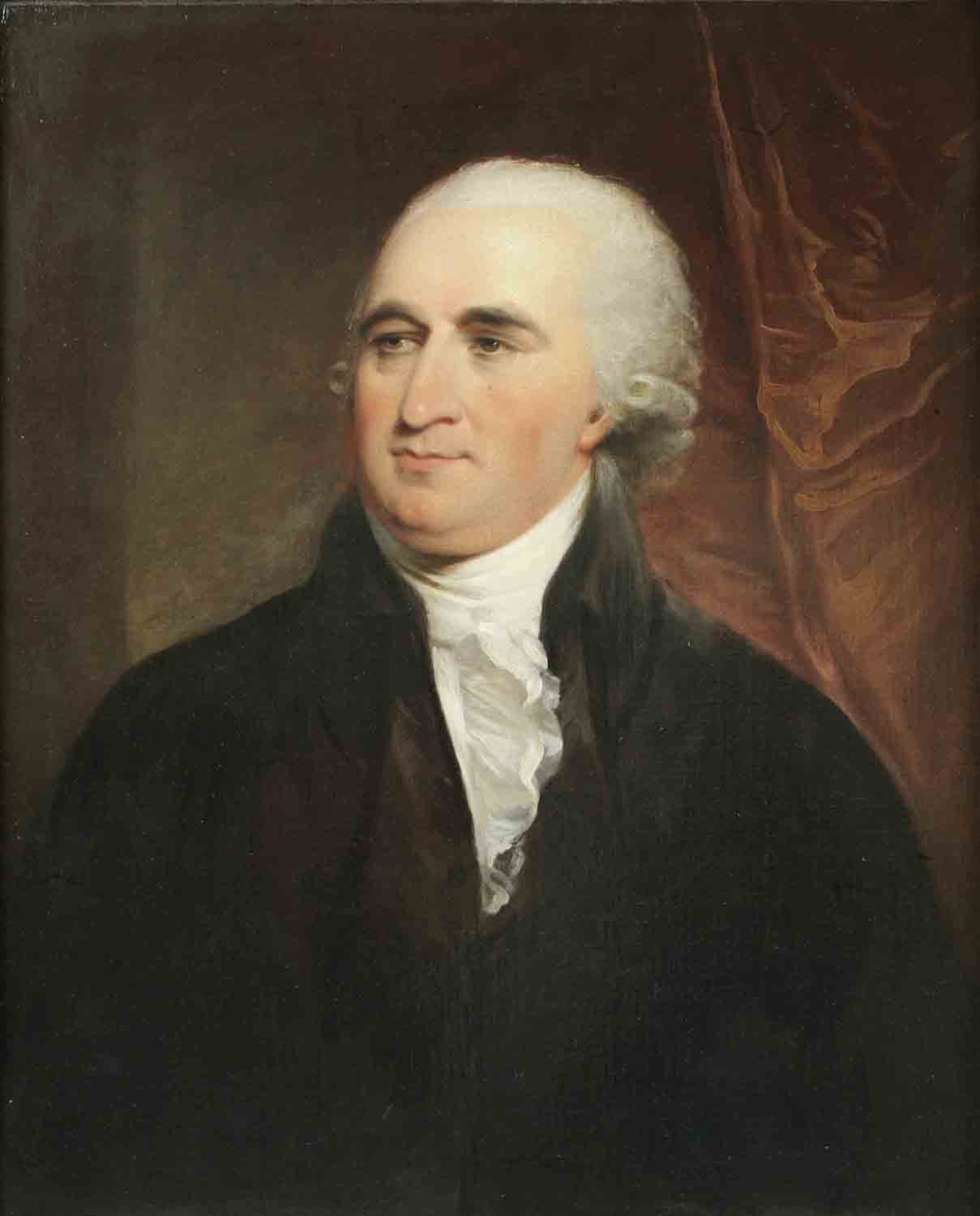
- Portrait by John Trumbull

Judge of the United States District Court for the District of New York
- In office September 26, 1789 – March 17, 1794
- Appointed by: George Washington
- Preceded by: Seat established by 1 Stat. 73
- Succeeded by: John Laurance

45th Mayor of New York City
- In office 1784–1789
- Preceded by: David Mathews
- Succeeded by: Richard Varick

Personal details
- Born: February 6, 1733 New York City, Province of New York, British America
- Died: February 1, 1797 (aged 63) Schenectady, New York, U.S.
- Resting place: Christ Episcopal Church; Duanesburg, New York; 42.76896°N 74.15517°W
- Party: Federalist
- Parent: Anthony Duane Robert Livingston (guardian) (father)
- Relatives: George W. Featherstonhaugh Jr. James Chatham Duane

James Duane (February 6, 1733 – February 1, 1797) was an American Founding Father, attorney, jurist, and American Revolutionary leader from New York. He served as a delegate to the First Continental Congress, the Second Continental Congress and the Congress of the Confederation, a New York state senator, the 45th Mayor of New York City, the first European-American Mayor of New York City, the 1st post-colonial Mayor of New York City and a United States district judge of the United States District Court for the District of New York. Duane was a signatory of the Continental Association and the Articles of Confederation.

== Early life ==
Coat of Arms of James Duane

Duane was born on February 6, 1733, in New York City, in the Province of New York, to Anthony Duane and his second wife, Althea Ketaltas. Anthony Duane was a Protestant Irishman from County Galway who first came to New York as an officer of the Royal Navy in 1698. Duane's surname is from the Irish Ó Dubhain. In 1702, Anthony Duane left the navy to marry Eva Benson, daughter of Dirck Benson, a local merchant. They had two sons, Abraham and Cornelius. Duane prospered and bought land for investment, rental, and future development. After his wife's death, Anthony married Althea Ketaltas (Hettletas), the daughter of a wealthy Dutch merchant. By the time of James' birth, his father had become a wealthy colonial settler.

Duane's mother died in 1736, and his father married a third time in 1741 to Margaret Riken (Rycken). When Anthony died in 1747, James became the ward of Robert Livingston, the 3rd Lord of Livingston Manor, where he completed his early education.

== Career ==
Duane completed preparatory studies and read law in 1754, with James Alexander. He had an impressive command of the law and was admitted to the bar on August 3, 1754. He maintained a private practice in New York City from 1754 to 1762, when he became a clerk of the Chancery Court of New York.

Duane was acting attorney general of the Province of New York in 1767 and a boundary commissioner in 1768 (and again in 1784), before returning to private practice in New York City in 1774 and 1775. He was a delegate to the New York Convention which ratified the United States Constitution in 1788. Duane was a member of the Federalist Party.

=== Law practice and other activities ===
Duane represented Trinity Church in the very protracted legal action brought by heirs of Anneke Jans, who claimed that they, and not the church, were the lawful owners of much of lower Manhattan, a tract which had been given to the church by the British crown.

By the early 1770s, his practice earned him 1,400 pounds annually. At the height of his success, Duane had a house in Manhattan, one in the country, and an estate near Schenectady, New York, of 36,000 acres (15,000 ha) and 253 tenants. He was a vestryman of Trinity Church, was appointed one of the church's nine trustees during a post-war crisis about the church's Tory leanings, and was also a trustee of Kings College, the precursor to Columbia University.

In 1761, Duane acquired from Gerardus Stuyvesant a farm known as Krom Mesje ("little crooked knife") in reference to a small brook that flowed into the East River. He named it "Gramercy Seat". In addition to the farm, Duane also had a house on King Street (later changed to Pine Street). In 1765, he was granted a patent for land in Schenectady County, which became the township of Duanesburg.

With his boyhood friend James De Lancey, Duane was one of the Socialborough Proprietors, holding an area obtained by grant in 1771 and located on both sides of Otter Creek in the present towns of Pittsford and Rutland, Vermont.

=== American Revolution ===
Duane was politically conservative. Until his marriage to Mary Livingston, he had been a member of James De Lancey's political faction, which opposed to the Crown's policies but did not endorse the use of mob violence to protest British measures. His efforts to support resistance in New York led to his being chosen with others to represent the Province of New York at the Congressional meetings in Philadelphia. He remained active in both capacities.

Duane was a delegate to the First Continental Congress held in Philadelphia during the autumn of 1774 in reaction to the British Navy's blockade of Boston Harbor and the passage of the Intolerable Acts by Parliament in response to the December 1773 Boston Tea Party. He was one of the many who were most disposed to reconciliation with Britain and supported the Galloway Plan of Union, which was rejected by the majority of the delegates. Upon his return to New York, he was named to the Committee of Sixty, a committee of inspection formed in the City and County of New York (Manhattan, New York City) in 1775, to enforce the Continental Association, a boycott of British goods enacted by the First Continental Congress.

He was a delegate to the Provincial Convention held in New York City on April 20, 1775, where delegates were elected to the Second Continental Congress. It included the delegates to the First Congress as well as five new members. The scope of the Provincial Convention did not extend beyond electing delegates, who dispersed on April 22, the day before news of the Battles of Lexington and Concord arrived. The Second Continental Congress convened its first session on May 10. Duane served as a delegate from 1775 to 1781. Alexander Hamilton, an aide to General George Washington, wrote Duane to ask him to get Congress to expedite supplies.

The Committee of Sixty was replaced by a more representative Committee of One Hundred on May 1, 1775. The Committee still considered itself loyal to the British Crown but was opposed to the laws of the Parliament of Great Britain, which it considered unconstitutional because the colonies had no representation in it. The Committee of One Hundred was officially replaced by the New York Provincial Congress which first convened on May 23, 1775. Despite initial reservations regarding independence, he later supported the Declaration of Independence. Because of his service with the Provincial Congress, Duane was not in Philadelphia to sign the Declaration.

When the British occupied New York in late summer 1776, he withdrew his wife and family to the relative safety of her father's home at Livingston Manor. He was a member of the New York Constitutional Convention which assembled at White Plains, New York, on Sunday evening, July 10, 1776, for the purpose of drafting a constitution to replace the colonial charter.

In July 1778 he signed the Articles of Confederation in Philadelphia. Duane was a member of the Congress of the Confederation from 1781 to 1783. He remained active as a political leader throughout the war and returned home to Gramercy Seat in 1783. He commented that his home looked "as if they had been inhabited by wild beasts".

=== Post war activities ===
He was Mayor of New York City from 1784 to 1789, appointed by the Council of Appointment. As mayor, one of Duane's first acts was to donate to the poor the money usually spent on entertainment for his inauguration, about 20 guineas. During his time in office, he strove to help the city revive itself after the damage done by the war and the British occupation, but he was unable to maintain the city's status as the capital of the United States. As head of the Mayor's Court, he heard the landmark case of Rutgers v. Waddington, handing down a Solomonic decision that pleased neither party. After he was called before the State Assembly to explain his thinking, he was censured by that body.

He was a member of the New York State Senate from 1782 to 1785, and from 1788 to 1790. In 1785, Duane was one of 32 prominent New Yorkers who met to create the New York Manumission Society, which was intended to put pressure on the state of New York to abolish slavery, as every state in the north had done except New York and New Jersey.

He was chosen a member of the Annapolis Convention in 1786 but did not attend.

=== Federal judicial service ===
Duane was nominated by President George Washington on September 25, 1789, to the United States District Court for the District of New York, to a new seat authorized by 1 Stat. 73. He was confirmed by the United States Senate on September 25, 1789, and received his commission on September 26, 1789. He resigned on March 17, 1794, because of ill health.

== Personal life ==
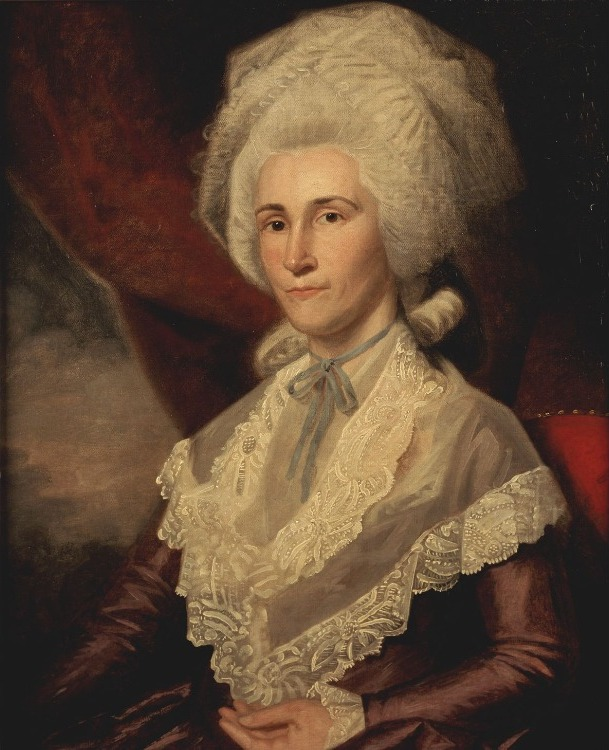
Mary Livingston

On October 21, 1759, Duane married Mary Livingston (1738–1821), the eldest living daughter of his former guardian Robert. Their children were:

- Mary Duane (b. 1762), who married Gen. William North (1755–1836) on October 14, 1787
- Catharine L. Duane
- Adelia Duane (1765–1860), who married merchant Alfred Sands Pell.
- James Chatham Duane (1769–1842), who married Mary Ann Bowers (1773–1828)
- Cornelius Duane (1774–1781), who died young
- Sarah Duane (1775–1828), who married George W. Featherstonhaugh (1780–1866) on November 6, 1808

Duane's grandchildren included George W. Featherstonhaugh Jr. (1814–1900), Robert Livingston Pell (1811–1880), James Duane Pell (1813–1881), George W. Pell (1820–1896), and Richard Montgomery Pell (1822–1882). His great-grandchildren included Alfred Duane Pell (1864–1937) and James Chatham Duane (1824–1897).

== Death and legacy ==
Duane died on February 1, 1797, in Duanesburg, Schenectady County, New York. (Note: He may have died in New York City, according to his Congressional Biography.)He was interred under Christ Church in Duanesburg.

Duane Street in Manhattan was named in his honor. Duane Park, at the corner of Duane and Hudson streets is named for him. The Fire Department of New York operated a fireboat named James Duane from 1908 to 1959. The town of Duanesburg, New York, in the western part of Schenectady County, is named for James Duane, who held most of it as an original land grant.

The Northern District of New York Federal Court Bar Association presents the annual Judge James Duane Award upon "...a distinguished member of the bar who has carried on Judge Duane’s legacy of excellence in the practice of law, unwavering integrity, and a tireless commitment to the legal profession." James Joseph Duane, an American law professor at the Regent University School of Law, is a living descendant of James Duane who has received online attention for his video lecture "Don't Talk To Police".

Ed Jewett portrayed Duane in the 2008 John Adams miniseries directed by Tom Hooper. He appeared in episode 2 "Independence."

== Sources ==
- Burrows, Edwin G. and Wallace, Mike (1999). Gotham: A History of New York City to 1898. New York: Oxford University Press. ISBN 0-195-11634-8.
- The Duane Family Papers 1700-1945 at the New York Historical Society
- United States Congress. "James Duane (id: D000508)". Biographical Directory of the United States Congress.
- Portrait of James Duane
- James Duane Historic Marker
- Gramercy Park's Hawk Gets a Name
- Know Your Mayors

Political offices
Preceded by David Mathews	Mayor of New York City; 1784–1789	Succeeded by Richard Varick
Legal offices
Preceded by Seat established by 1 Stat. 73	Judge of the United States District Court for the District of New York; 1789–1794	Succeeded by John Laurance
