= Anthony Duane =

Anthony Duane (c. 1679–1747) was a Protestant Irish immigrant to New York who was the father of James Duane, later a congressman, mayor of New York City, and U.S. judge.

Anthony Duane was born in County Galway c.1679 and joined the Royal Navy, becoming an officer. He first came to New York in 1698 where he met and courted Eva, the daughter of local merchant Dirck Benson. In 1702, Duane left the navy to marry Eva and settle in New York City, where he pursued a mercantile career. Before her death, they had two sons, Abraham and Cornelius.

Duane prospered and bought land for investment, rental, and future development. When Eva died, he remarried, this time to Altea Ketaltas (Hettletas), the daughter of a wealthy Dutch merchant family. The couple's only child was James. When Altea died in 1736, Duane married a third time in 1741, to a Margaret Riken (or Rycken), the widow of Thomas Lynch of Flushing, New York.

Anthony Duane died in 1747.
