= John Laurance =

American judge (1750–1810)

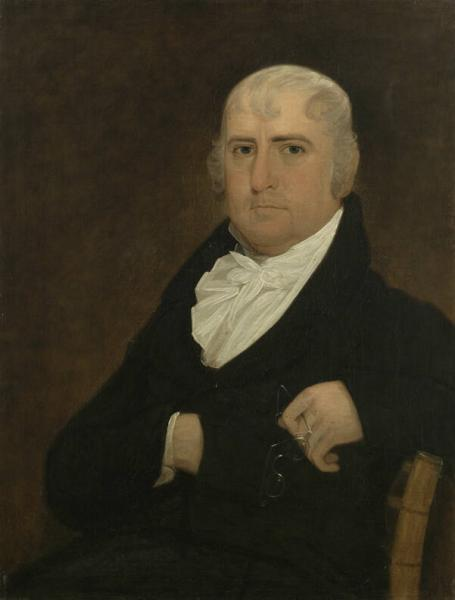

President pro tempore of the United States Senate
- In office December 4, 1798 – December 27, 1798
- Preceded by: Theodore Sedgwick
- Succeeded by: James Ross

United States Senator from New York
- In office November 9, 1796 – August 1, 1800
- Preceded by: Rufus King
- Succeeded by: John Armstrong Jr.

Judge of the United States District Court for the District of New York
- In office May 6, 1794 – November 8, 1796
- Appointed by: George Washington
- Preceded by: James Duane
- Succeeded by: Robert Troup

Member of the U.S. House of Representatives from New York's 2nd district
- In office March 4, 1789 – March 3, 1793
- Preceded by: Seat established
- Succeeded by: John Watts

Personal details
- Born: John Laurance; 1750 Falmouth, Cornwall, England, Kingdom of Great Britain
- Died: November 11, 1810 (aged 59–60) New York City, U.S.
- Resting place: First Presbyterian Church; New York City, U.S.
- Party: Federalist
- Education: read law

John Laurance (sometimes spelled "Lawrence" or "Laurence") (1750 – November 11, 1810) was a delegate to the 6th, 7th, and 8th Congresses of the Confederation, a United States representative and United States Senator from New York and a United States district judge of the United States District Court for the District of New York.

Laurance briefly served as President pro tempore of the United States Senate in December 1798.

== Education and career ==
Born in 1750, near Falmouth, Cornwall, England, Laurance immigrated to the Province of New York, British America in 1767 and settled in New York City.

He pursued academic studies, then read law in 1772, with Cadwallader Colden, the Lieutenant Governor of New York.

He was admitted to the bar and entered private practice in New York City, Province of New York, from July 4, 1776) from 1772 to 1776.

In 1775, Laurance married Elizabeth McDougall, the daughter of General Alexander McDougall.

== Military service ==
Laurance served in the Continental Army during the American Revolutionary War as a commissioned officer from 1775 to 1782. At the outbreak of war in 1775, he was appointed a second lieutenant in the 4th New York Regiment, and took part in the 1775 Invasion of Quebec. In 1776, he received a commission as captain and paymaster of the Continental Army's 1st New York Regiment, serving under his father-in-law Alexander McDougall (sometimes spelled MacDougall).

He was Judge Advocate General from 1777 to 1782. Among the cases he handled were prosecuting at the court-martial of Charles Lee for insubordination in 1778, and the 1779 court-martial of Benedict Arnold for corruption. He also presided at the trial of Major John André, serving on the 1780 board that convicted the major of spying and sentenced him to death by hanging, and was the board's recorder.

Laurance attained the rank of colonel and resigned his commission in 1782. He was a charter member of the Society of the Cincinnati.

== Post-war career ==
He resumed private practice in New York City from 1782 to 1785. Among Laurance's legal apprentices was Charles Adams, son of President John Adams. He was also active in land speculation and other business ventures with Alexander Hamilton.

He was a member of the New York State Assembly, serving from 1782 to 1783 from Westchester County, and from New York County from 1784 to 1785.

He was a regent of the University of the State of New York in 1784. He was a trustee of Columbia College (now Columbia University) from 1784 to 1810.

He was a delegate to the 6th, 7th and 8th Congresses of the Confederation (Continental Congresses) from 1785 to 1787.

He was a member of the New York State Senate from 1788 to 1790. While serving in the State Senate, Laurance was also a member of New York City's Board of Aldermen.

He was an ardent supporter of adopting the United States Constitution.

== United States representative ==
Laurance was elected as a Federalist from New York's 2nd congressional district to the United States House of Representatives of the 1st and 2nd United States Congresses, serving from March 4, 1789, to March 3, 1793. During this time, in 1790, his first wife Elizabeth (McDougall) Laurance died, and in 1791 he married Elizabeth Lawrence Allen (d. 1800), the widow of attorney James Allen, and mother of four children.

== Federal judicial service ==
Laurance was nominated by President George Washington on May 5, 1794, to a seat on the United States District Court for the District of New York vacated by Judge James Duane. He was confirmed by the United States Senate on May 6, 1794, and received his commission the same day. His service terminated on November 8, 1796, due to his resignation, after his election as United States Senator from New York.

== United States senator ==
Laurance was elected as a Federalist to the United States Senate from New York to fill the vacancy caused by the resignation of United States Senator Rufus King and served from November 9, 1796, until August 1800, when he resigned. He served as President pro tempore of the United States Senate during the 5th United States Congress.

== Later career and death ==
Following his departure from Congress, Laurance resumed private practice in New York City from 1800 to 1810, also residing there until his death. He died on November 11, 1810, in New York City. He was interred at the First Presbyterian Church in Manhattan.

== Legacy ==
After more than two centuries of neglect by historians, the first book-length study of John Laurance was published by the American Philosophical Society in 2019.

== See also ==
- List of United States senators born outside the United States

== Sources ==
=== Internet ===
- Bickford, Charlene; et al. (2002). "John Laurance, Representative from New York". Documentary History of the First Federal Congress Project. Columbia, SC: Model Editions Partnership.

=== Magazines ===
- Judge Advocate General's Corps (January 1, 1964). "John Lawrence, Judge Advocate General, 1777-1782". Military Law Review. Washington, DC: Headquarters, Department of the Army.

== External sources ==
- United States Congress. "John Laurance (id: L000120)". Biographical Directory of the United States Congress.
- "Laurance, John | Federal Judicial Center". www.fjc.gov.
- The New York Civil List compiled by Franklin Benjamin Hough (pages 62, 113f, 142, 161f and 287; Weed, Parsons and Co., 1858) [gives surname as "Lawrence"]
- Members of the 4th U.S. Congress
- Members of the 6th U.S. Congress
- Rines, George Edwin, ed. (1920). "Lawrance, John" . Encyclopedia Americana.

U.S. House of Representatives
| Preceded by Seat established | Member of the U.S. House of Representatives from New York's 2nd congressional district 1789–1793 | Succeeded by John Watts |
Legal offices
| Preceded by James Duane | Judge of the United States District Court for the District of New York; 1794–1796 | Succeeded by Robert Troup |
U.S. Senate
| Preceded by Rufus King | U.S. senator (Class 3) from New York; 1796–1800 | Succeeded by John Armstrong Jr. |
Political offices
| Preceded by Theodore Sedgwick | President pro tempore of the United States Senate; 1798 | Succeeded by James Ross |
