= George William Featherstonhaugh =

British-American geologist and geographer (1780–1866)

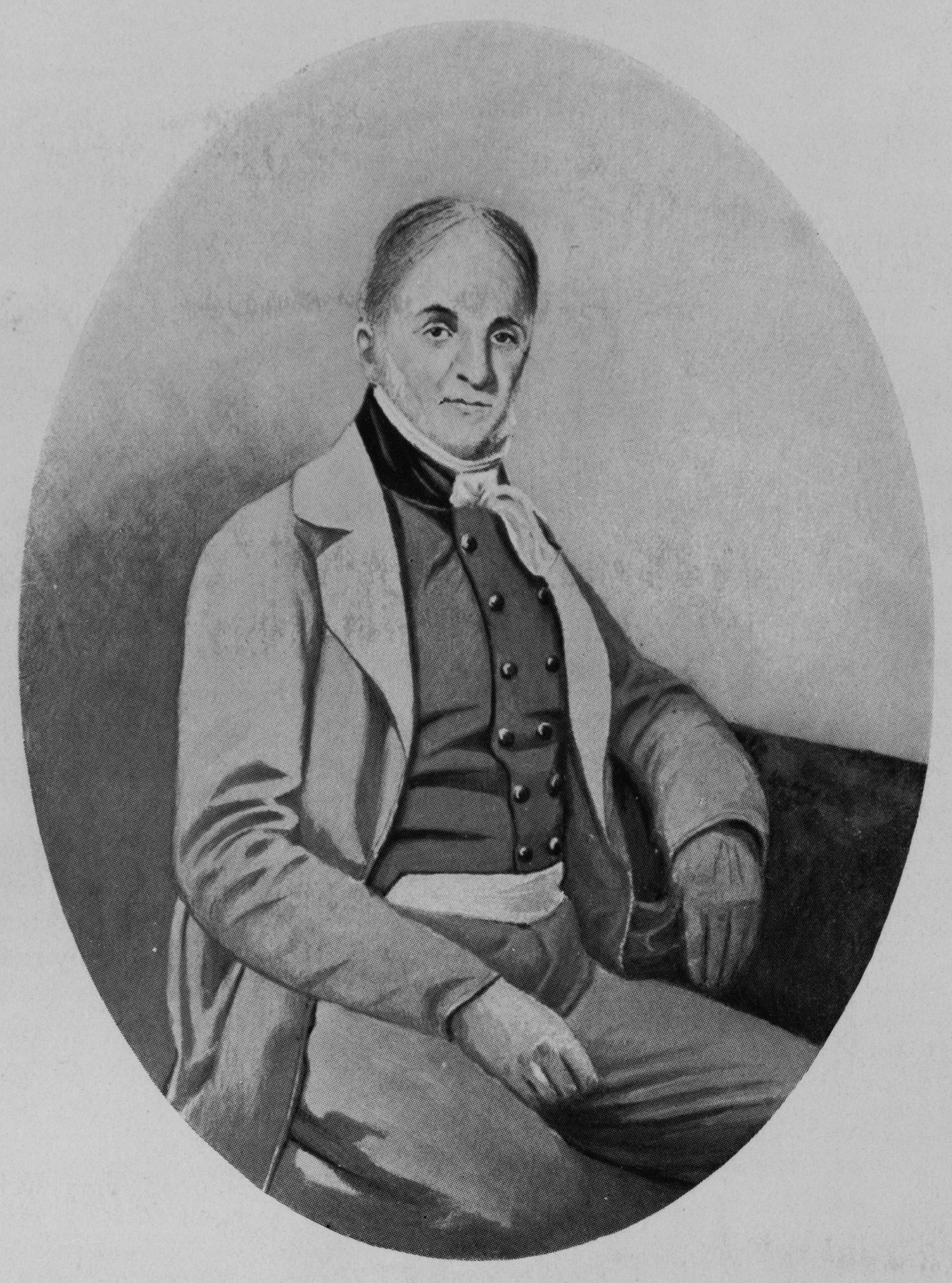
- Born: 9 April 1780; London, England
- Died: 28 September 1866 (aged 86); Le Havre, France
- Resting place: Tunbridge Wells, England
- Occupations: Farmer, geologist and surveyor
- Known for: Explorer; railway pioneer
- Spouse(s): Sarah Duane (1808-11-06 – 1826), Charlotte Williams Carter (m. 1831-01-28)
- Children: By Sarah: James, Ann d1826, George, Jr., and Georgianna d1826; By Charlotte: Albany, Georgiannia, and Henry
- Parent(s): George and Dorothy Simpson Featherstonhaugh

George William Featherstonhaugh FRS (/ˈfɪərstənhɔː/ FEER-stən-haw; 9 April 1780 – 28 September 1866) was a British-American geologist and geographer. He was one of the proposers of the Albany and Schenectady Railroad and was the first geologist to the US government. He surveyed portions of the Louisiana Purchase for the US government.

== Early life and career ==
Born to George and Dorothy Simpson Featherstonhaugh in London, he grew up in Scarborough, North Yorkshire, England. Featherstonhaugh liked climbing cliffs, collecting fossils, and gathering wild bird eggs to sell. He was adept at writing and became a Fellow of the Geological Society and the Royal Society. In 1809, he was elected as a member to the American Philosophical Society in Philadelphia.

== Railroad plans ==
In 1806 he went to the United States where he planned to study the languages of the indigenous people. He married Sarah Duane of Schenectady, New York, on 6 November 1808. They had four children: James, Ann, George Jr., and Georgianna. He farmed, organised the first New York Board of Agriculture, and advocated the building of steam railroads in the United States. Difficulty experienced in the economic transportation of his crops led Featherstonhaugh to advocate a steam railroad that would connect the Hudson River at Albany, New York, with the navigable Mohawk River at Schenectady. His acquaintance with George Stephenson (1781–1848) facilitated his quest. Ten years were spent in an attempt to educate the public for the experiment and it was not until December 1825, that Featherstonhaugh was determined to apply for a charter. This was granted on 17 April 1826.

The painter Thomas Cole spent the winter of 1825–6 at Featherstonhaugh's estate, painting four views of the house in its landscape setting including Landscape, the Seat of Mr. Featherstonhaugh in the Distance, but found Featherstonhaugh a "heartless employer". After the death of his wife and two daughters and a calamitous fire, Featherstonhaugh sold his estate at Duanesburg. He later came to Philadelphia and, on 28 January 1831, married Charlotte Williams Carter in Schenectady County, New York. They had three children: Albany, Georgiannia, and Henry.

Construction of the railroad began on 29 July 1830, and one year later the road was completed from Engine hill (near the top of Crane Street hill) in Schenectady to Lydius street (known today as Madison Avenue) in the western suburb of Albany. Formal opening of the road was on 13 August 1831, when the DeWitt Clinton pulled the first train to Schenectady.

The Albany and Schenectady Railroad justified Featherstonhaugh's vision, and made the Mohawk Valley the center of early railroad construction in New York State. In 1832 the Saratoga and Schenectady Rail Road was completed, the Schenectady terminus being at what is now Water and Railroad Streets.

In July 1831 Featherstonhaugh issued the sole edition of the Monthly American Journal of Geology and Natural Science.

== Exploring the Louisiana Purchase ==
After acquiring a vast quantity of unexplored land in the Louisiana Purchase in 1803, the government sought to document the mineral resources of the territory. In 1834, Featherstonhaugh, newly appointed as the first US government geologist, was instructed to examine the elevated country between the Missouri and the Red River and report back to Colonel John James Abert of the Topographical Bureau.

With his son George Jr. as his assistant, he set out to explore Arkansas the territory from a base in St. Louis, Missouri.

== Among the Cherokees ==
In 1835, Featherstonhaugh travelled from Green Bay, Wisconsin, up the Fox River to the Wisconsin River, then downstream to Prairie du Chien, and into the Mississippi River. He paddled up the Mississippi, passing the St. Croix River and the Minnesota River, stopping at Carver's Cave and Saint Anthony Falls.

In August 1837 after travelling along the Mississippi, Ohio, and Tennessee rivers, Featherstonhaugh joined with Special Government Agent John Mason, Jr. to attend the Cherokee National Council at Red Clay, Tennessee, at the beginning of the crisis that eventually led to the Cherokee Removal, sometimes called the "Trail of Tears". He spent more than a month with these Indians, and was an eyewitness to the resistance of Principal Chief John Ross and the Cherokee people to the fraudulent Treaty of New Echota. The public purpose of his visit was to inspect for the federal government the geology of the mountainous regions of Georgia and North Carolina where gold had been discovered, but there was also another covert mission. In his memoirs, Featherstonhaugh described a pleasant encounter with a learned Welsh-born Baptist missionary Rev. Evan Jones, a fellow Britisher residing among the Cherokees. However, in a secret memoranda sent to General Winfield Scott in May 1838, he wrote: "Evan Jones, An Englishman of dark, cunning character. This man many years ago settled as a missionary amongst the Cherokee, knows their language well, and has had a great deal of personal intercourse with them. In the event of a rupture with these people, he is a person likely to give them bad advice, and I should advise his removal from the Nation." This memorandum also lists four other White men living with the Cherokees, analyses tribal politics, and provides an estimate of a possible military confrontation with the tribe because of the upland topography.

In 1837 Featherstonhaugh sat for Hiram Powers the sculptor who considered him to have a "fine head".

== Back to England ==
Featherstonhaugh returned to England in 1838 with his wife and children. On account of his thorough knowledge of the United States, he was appointed by the British government a commissioner to settle the northern boundary of the United States under the Webster-Ashburton Treaty. For the successful execution of this task, he was appointed consul from the British government to the departments of Calvados and Seine, France. When Louis Napoleon led a military coup against the King of France, Featherstonhaugh almost single-handedly arranged and led the escape of the King and Queen through Le Havre to England to the delight of the British Government, Queen Victoria, and the public. Later, he spent much time writing and publishing the journals of his travels in the United States. He died in Le Havre, France, 28 September 1866, and is buried at Tunbridge Wells, England.

== Family ==
His son was George W. Featherstonhaugh, Jr., who was a businessman in Wisconsin and who served in the Wisconsin Territorial Legislature from 1846 to 1848.

== Works ==
- Cicero, The Republic, New York, 1828 (translation)
- Alessandro Manzoni, I Promessi Sposi; or, The Betrothed Lovers. A Milanese Story of the Seventeenth Century, Washington: Duff Green, 1834 (translation)
- Report of a Geological Reconnaissance made in 1835 from the Seat of Government by the way of Green Bay and the Wisconsin Territory to the Coteau du Prairie, an Elevated Ridge Dividing the Missouri from the Saint Peters River, 1836
- Observations on the Ashburton Treaty, London, 1842
- Excursion Through the Slave States, New York, 1844
- A Canoe Voyage up the Minnay Sotor, 2 vols., London, 1847
