= DeWitt Clinton School =

DeWitt Clinton Elementary School
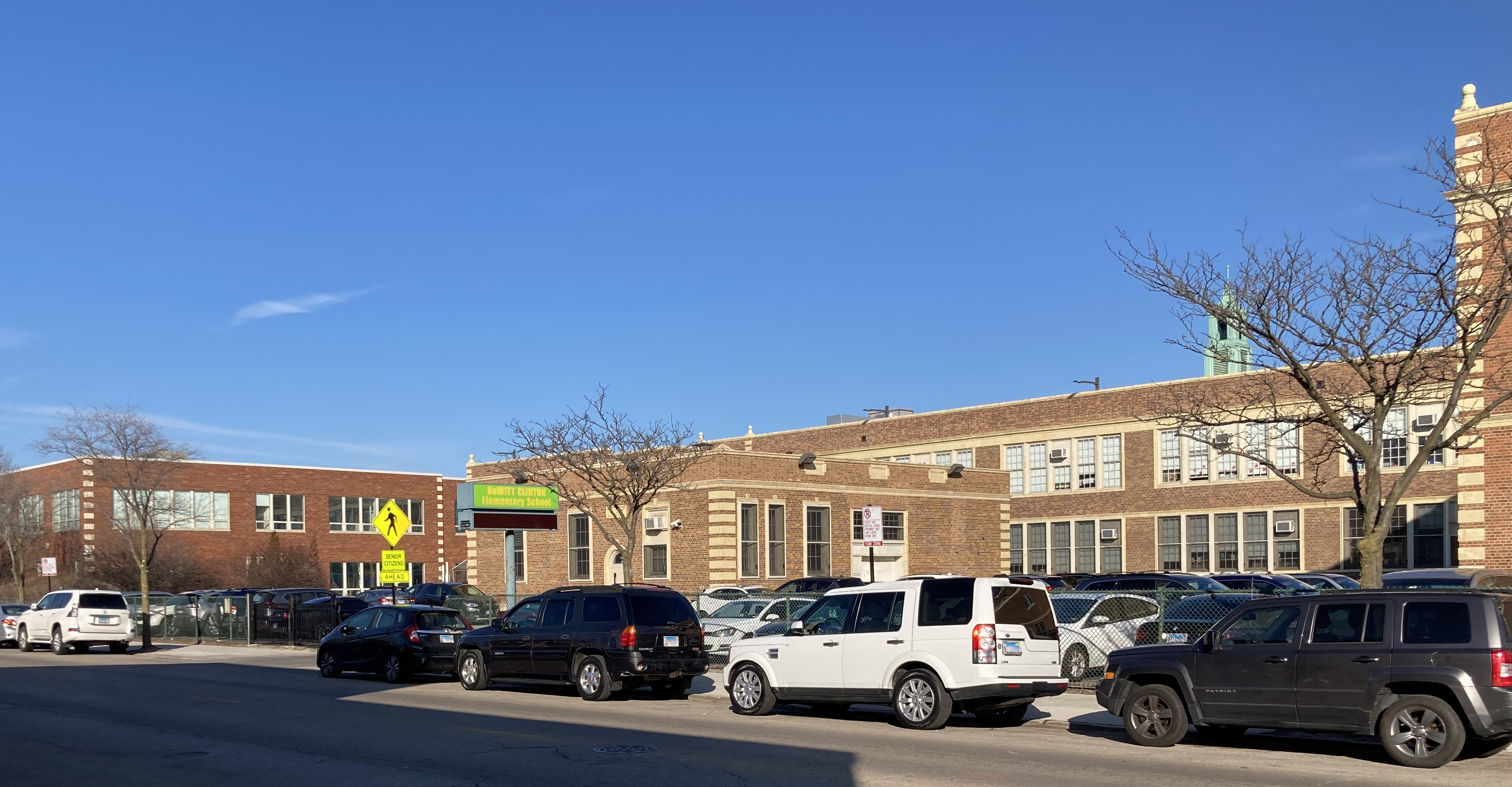

Location
- 6110 North Fairfield Avenue; Chicago, Illinois 60659; United States; 41.9929°N 87.6987°W

Information
- School type: Public Elementary
- School district: Chicago Public Schools
- Principal: Maureen Delgado
- Grades: preK-8
- Enrollment: 1,154
- Campus type: Urban
- Colors: Green and Gold
- Website: clinton.cps.edu

DeWitt Clinton School is a Chicago Public School on the north side of Chicago, Illinois.

== "One Year Older, One Year Smarter" program ==
In 2003, alumnus Jim Mills donated $1 million to the Clinton School to help start the "One Year Older, One Year Smarter" program. This progressive achievement program offers the following cash awards.

- $25 to any students who score higher on the Illinois Standards Achievement Test (ISAT) than they did the year before.
- $50 to the best improvement in the class
- $100 to the two students who score highest in their class.
- $1,000 to the person who scores highest in their grade and to the student in each grade who has improved most from the year before.
- $5,000 to the student who shows the most improvement from the previous year.

In addition, each year Mills presents a $10,000 savings bond to the student with the highest score in the school. Overall, Clinton has scored highest in the statewide ISAT test for three consecutive years.

== Other facts and notable alumni ==
The school mascot is the Clinton Cougar and the school colors are green and gold. Every year 7th graders take a trip to Springfield, Illinois, and the 8th graders go to Washington D.C.

One of the school's most famous graduates is the late celebrity and movie critic Gene Siskel, one-time host (along with Roger Ebert) of the TV show At the Movies.
