= DeWitt Clinton (locomotive) =

Early American locomotive

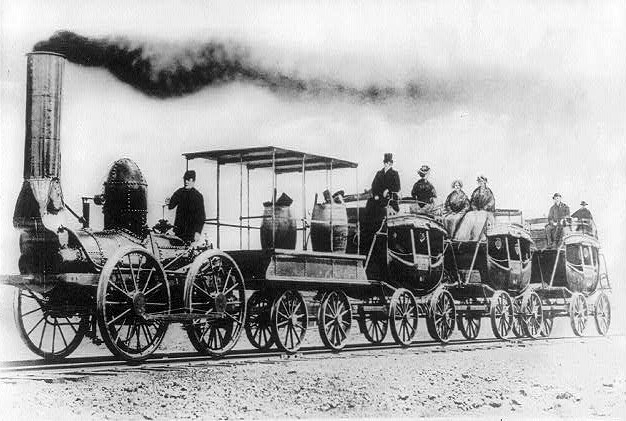
Type and origin
- Power type: Steam
- Build date: 1831
Specifications
- Configuration
  - Whyte: 0-4-0
- Length
  - Over body: 12 ft 10 in (3.91 m)
- Height: 12 ft (3.7 m)
- Loco weight: 6,758 lb (3.065 t)
Career
- Operators: Mohawk and Hudson Railroad
- First run: 1831
- Disposition: scrapped

The DeWitt Clinton of the Mohawk and Hudson Railroad (M&H) was an American steam locomotive and the first working steam locomotive built for service in New York state.

The locomotive was built in 1831 and began operations the same year. It was named in honor of DeWitt Clinton, the governor of New York State responsible for the Erie Canal, a competitor to the railroad. Portions of the steam engine were cast at the West Point Foundry in Cold Spring, New York. The DeWitt Clinton's first run was from the city of Albany, New York, to Schenectady, New York, a run of 16 or 17 mi (26 or 27 km). Its passenger cars were made of stagecoach bodies in which riders would sit either inside or on outdoor rumble seats. The cars were known as Goold cars and were named after coach builder James Goold of Albany.

The locomotive was scrapped in 1833. The M&H became part of the New York Central Railroad (NYCR) system in 1853. The New York Central Railroad built a replica of the locomotive for display at the Columbian Exposition in Chicago in 1893. This replica would continue to be used for promotional purposes until it was purchased by Henry Ford in 1934. Since then, it has been on display at the Henry Ford Museum in Dearborn, Michigan.

== Design ==
The original DeWitt Clinton was a 0-4-0 locomotive which measured 12 ft 10 in (3.91 m) in length and weighed 6,758 lb (3.065 t), while its 1893 replica was heavier at 9,420 lb (4.27 t). The locomotive was very similar to future locomotives with a horizontal boiler and a smokestack at the front. The top of the smokestack was about 12 ft (3.7 m) from the rail. The locomotive also had an early flatbed tender to store its fuel.

== DeWitt Clinton (Governor) ==
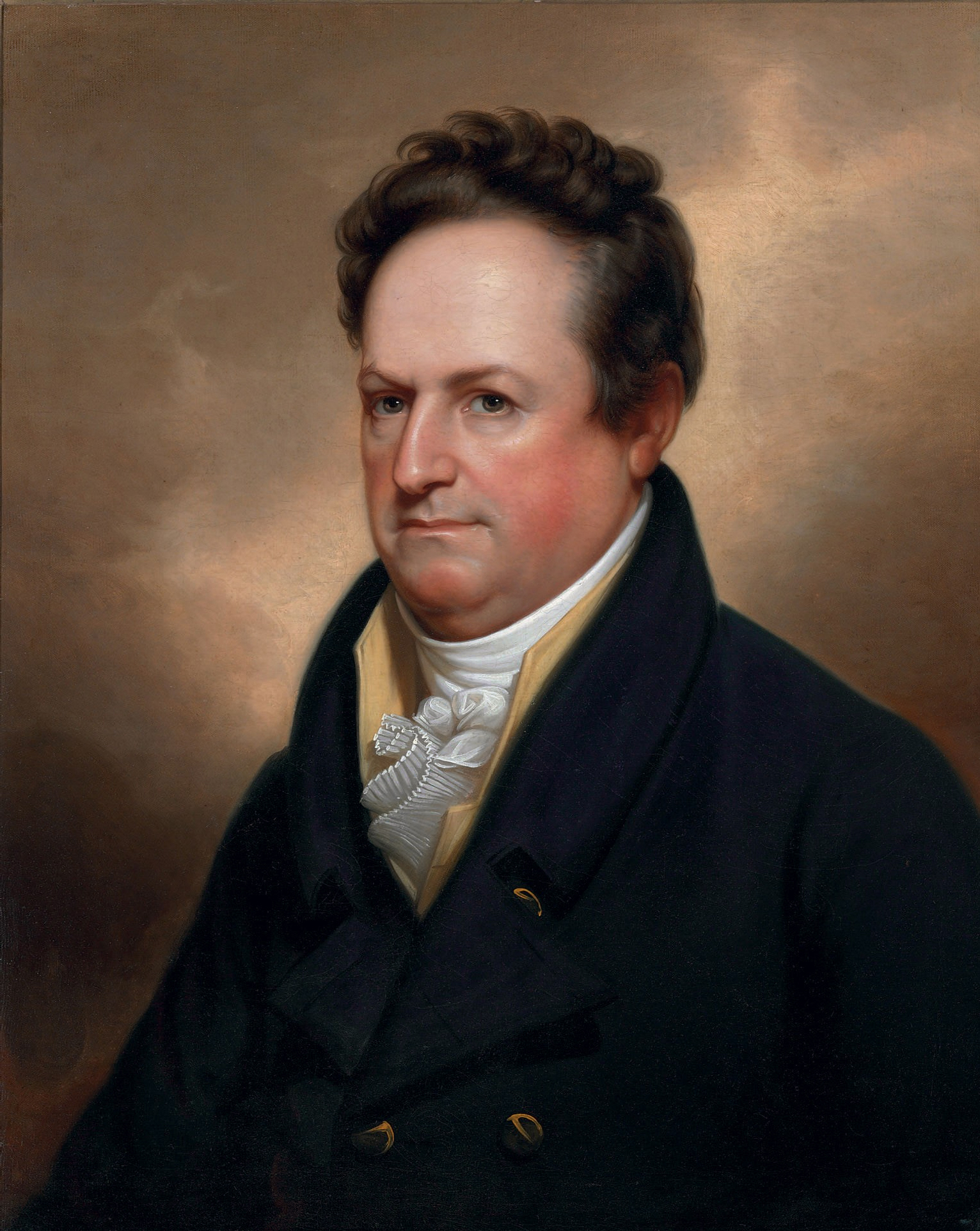
Portrait of DeWitt Clinton by Rembrandt Peale, 1823

DeWitt Clinton was born on March 2, 1769, in Little Britain, New York. Clinton entered politics in 1790 and for the next five years worked as a secretary for his uncle, Governor George Clinton. DeWitt Clinton served in the New York House of Representatives from 1797 to 1798, the New York Senate from 1798 to 1802, and the United States Senate from 1802-1803. From 1803 to 1815, Clinton was the mayor of New York City.

From 1810 to 1824, Clinton was New York Canal Commissioner. Construction of the Erie Canal under Clinton would begin in 1817 and continue until 1825, when the Canal was officially opened. The Mohawk and Hudson Railroad Company (the owner of the DeWitt Clinton locomotive) would be founded two years later in 1826. During the construction of the Erie Canal, Clinton was governor of New York State. He held from office from 1817 to 1823 and was re-elected in 1825. After 38 years of political service, DeWitt Clinton died on February 11, 1828, at the age of 58. The steam locomotive named in his honor would be completed in 1831 or three years after his death.

== Mohawk and Hudson Railroad ==
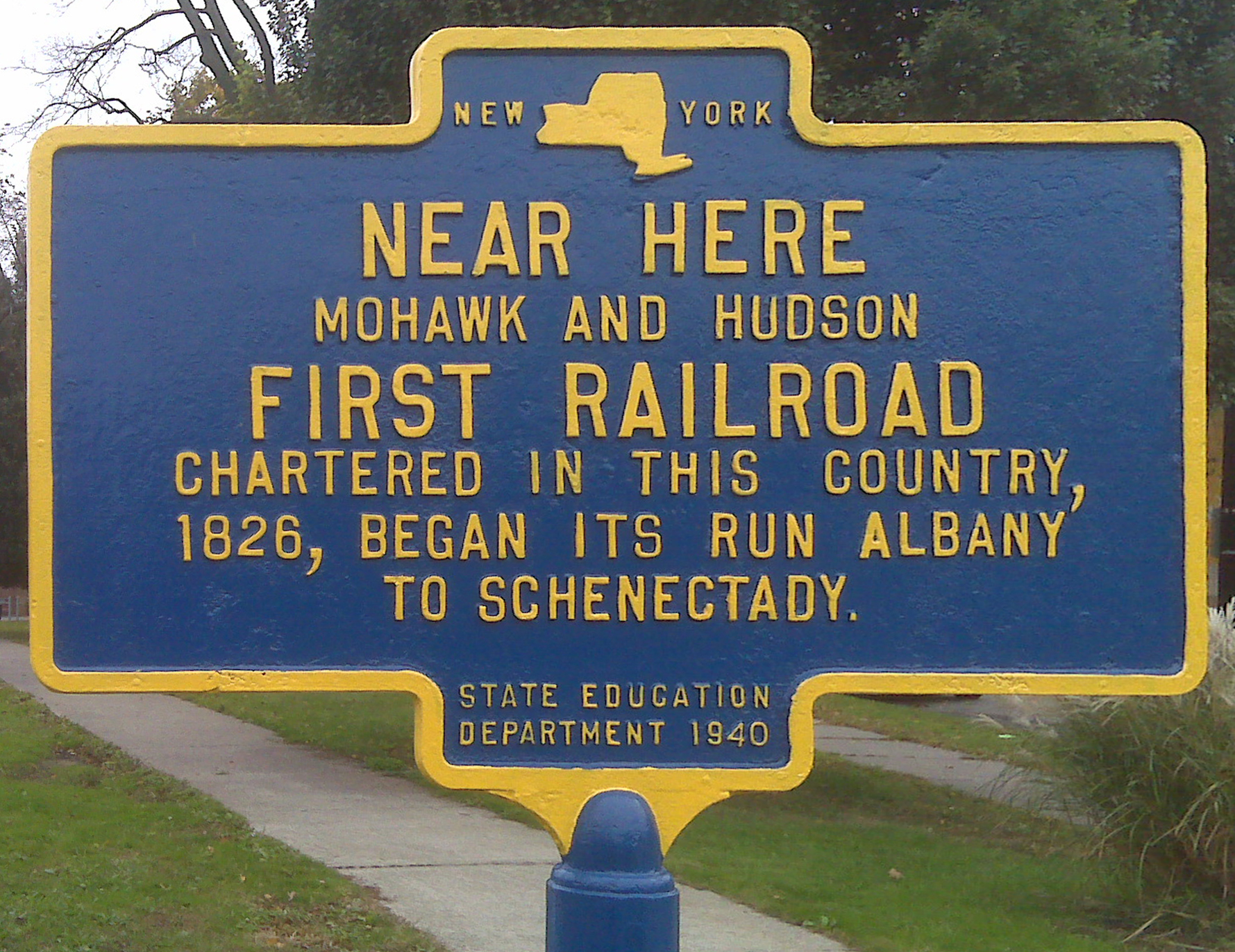
A sign commemorating the Mohawk and Hudson Railroad

Incorporated in 1826 at Albany, the Mohawk and Hudson Railroad Company was the first railroad company in the state of New York. The Mohawk and Hudson Railroad was named after the two rivers the company hoped to connect; the Hudson river in Albany and the Mohawk river in Schenectady. The state of New York had a set of waterways between the Atlantic Ocean and the Great Lakes which had been used for transport since before colonization. These waterways would become the basis for the Erie Canal between Albany and Buffalo in 1825. It was during this time that railroads were being considered as a faster, more efficient alternative to waterways. The construction of the M&H was overseen by its two directors, George William Featherstonhaugh and Stephen Van Rensselaer, with no other directors being identified in the charter.

Due to its increasing urban population, a route alongside the Erie Canal was considered the most logical option for the first New York railroad. In order to construct the new railroad, the railroad company had to overcome political opposition fueled by the popularity of the Erie Canal; opposition which would only cease by the 1860s, as canals were becoming obsolete in favor of the more efficient railroads. The canal distance between Albany to the southeast and Schenectady to the northwest was about 22 or 23 mi (35 or 37 km). With a railroad, goods and passengers would be able to travel from one city to the other in a straight line, or a distance of only 16 or 17 mi (26 or 27 km). Featherstonhaugh argued that the railroad would reduce the travel time between Albany and Schenectady from 2 or 3 days to 3 hours. On March 27, 1826 a bill was passed in Congress and Featherstonhaugh and Rensselaer were granted a sum of $300,000-$500,000 for the construction of one of the first chartered railroads in American history.

== Original DeWitt Clinton ==
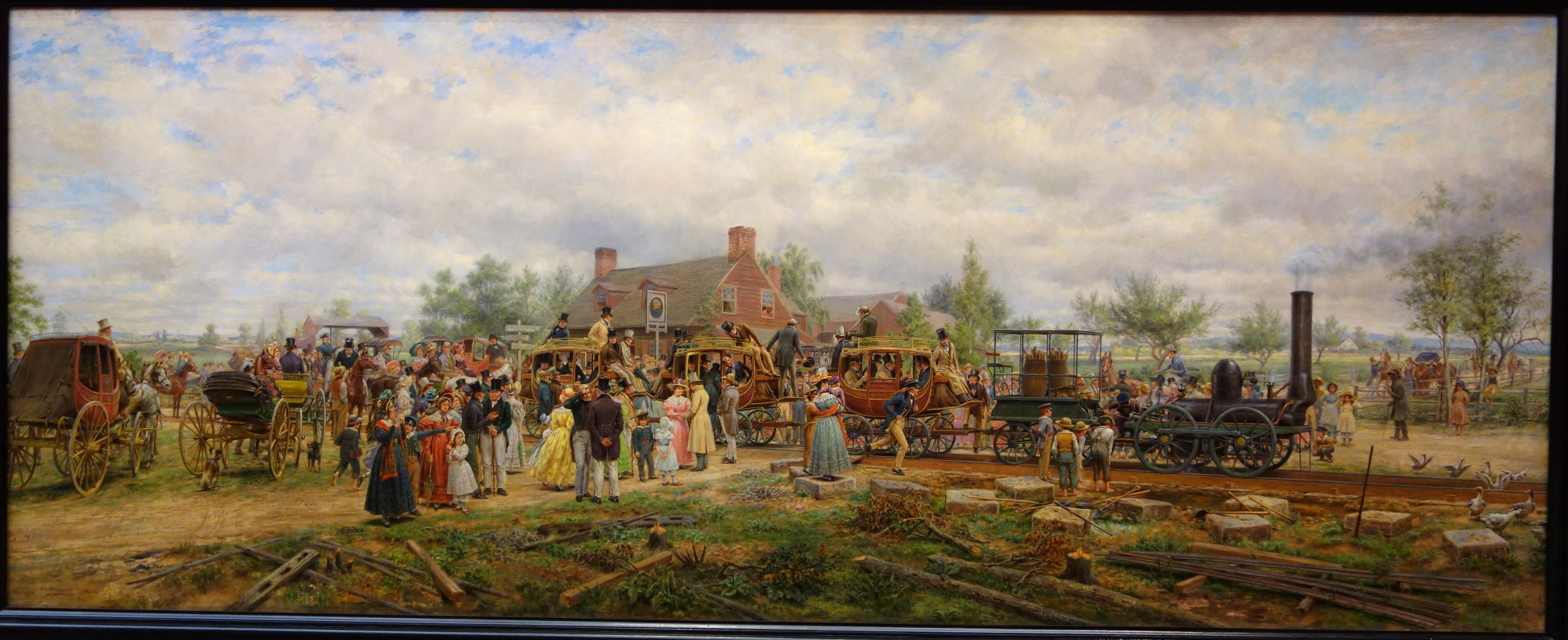
The First Railroad Train on the Mohawk and Hudson River, by Edward Lamson Henry, 1892-1893, oil on canvas

In 1831, the M&H constructed its first locomotive, the DeWitt Clinton. The locomotive was then delivered by boat on July 25, and given its first test run on July 30. The test showed that the Clinton was unable to make much heat from its supply of Lackawanna coal, and only reached a top speed 7 mph (11 km/h). To solve this problem, the railroad decided to replace the coal with coke. On August 3, another test was conducted with the substitute fuel. This time the Clinton made the run between Albany and Schenectady in an hour and 45 minutes, an average speed of about 9 to 10 mph (14 to 16 km/h).

On August 9, 1831, Clinton made its first passenger run on the same line. The locomotive was attached to a train of three coaches from Goold works in Albany. These were part of a collection of six specifically designed by James Goold for the M&H. The so-called “Goold Cars” were built from six stagecoach bodies and sold to the M&H for $310 a piece. Each coach could accommodate between 15 and 18 passengers. During its inaugural run, the locomotive impressed its passengers by completing the run in a record 38 minutes, with an average speed of 25 to 27 mph (40 to 43 km/h). A similar trip on the Erie Canal, by comparison, would have taken hours due to a longer route and boats being slowed down by more than a dozen locks.

The Mohawk and Hudson Railroad was officially opened on September 24, 1831. After about 2 to 3 years of continued service, the DeWitt Clinton was scrapped in 1833.

== DeWitt Clinton replica ==
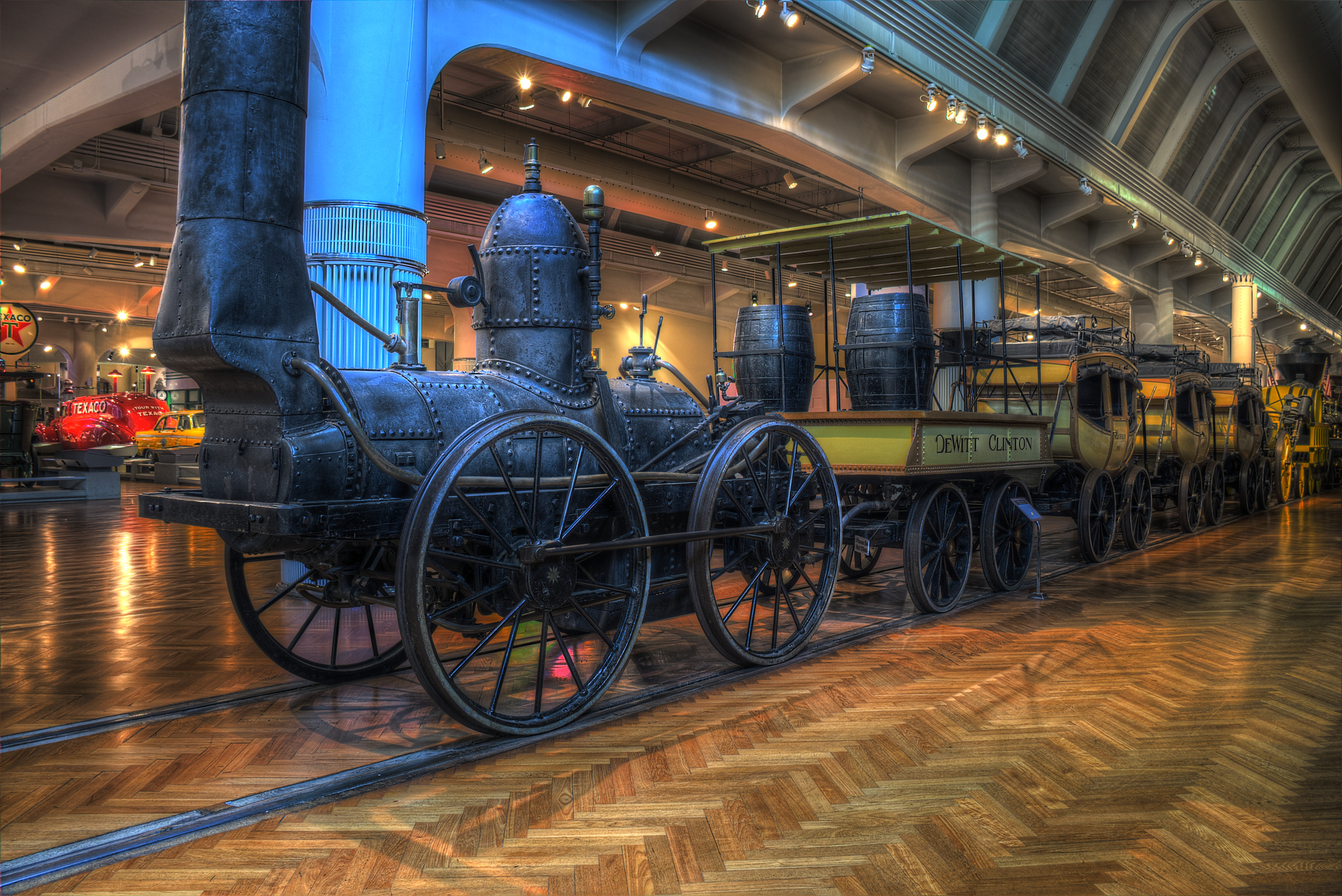
DeWitt Clinton replica and train at the Henry Ford Museum

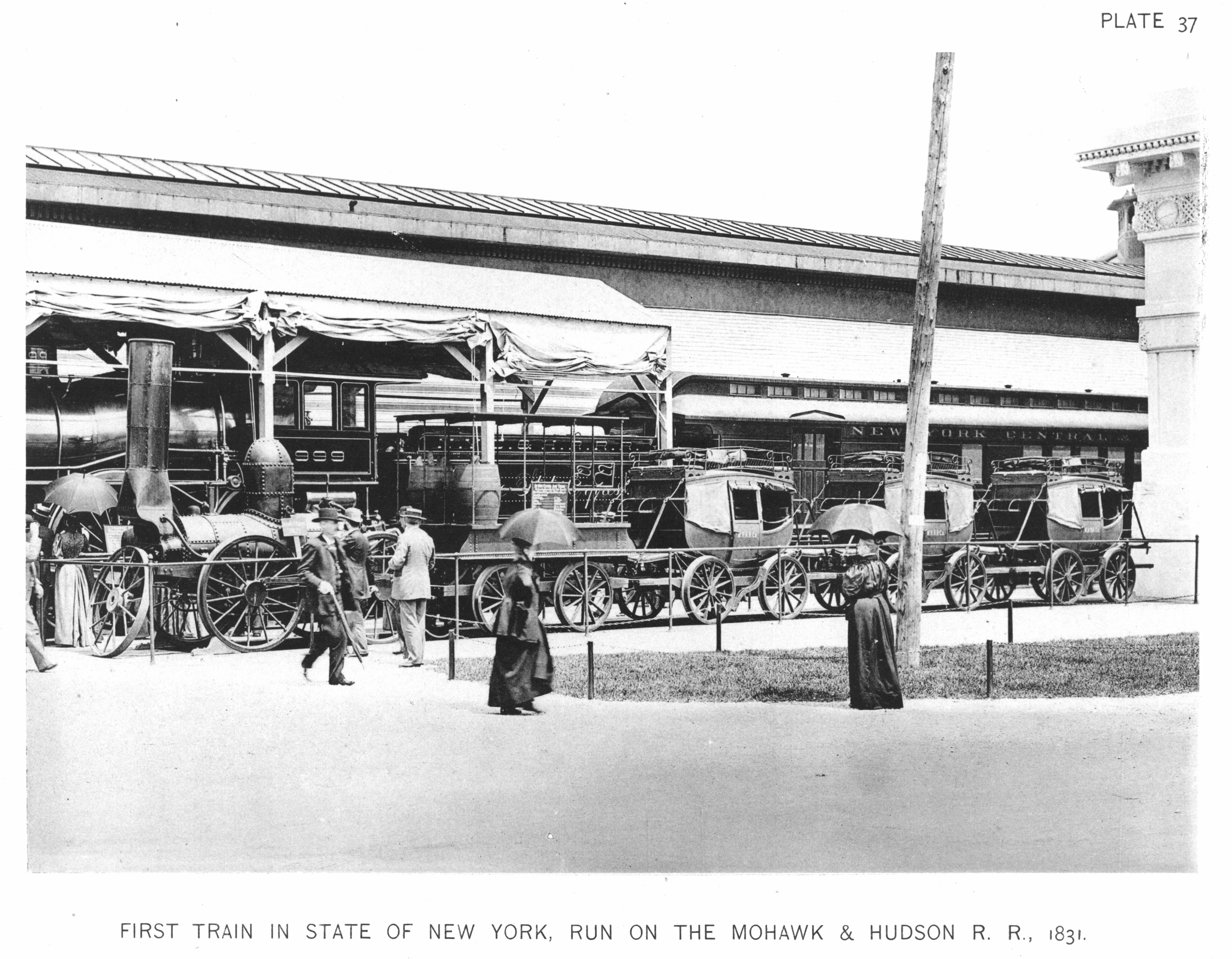
DeWitt Clinton replica at the Columbian Exposition of 1893

After the original DeWitt Clinton was scrapped, the M&H’s successor, the New York Central Railroad (NYCR) built a full-scale, operational reproduction of the DeWitt Clinton for the 1893 Columbian Exposition in Chicago. The fair was held that year to mark the 400th anniversary of the arrival of Christopher Columbus in 1492. This replica was accompanied by replicas of the original Goold cars.

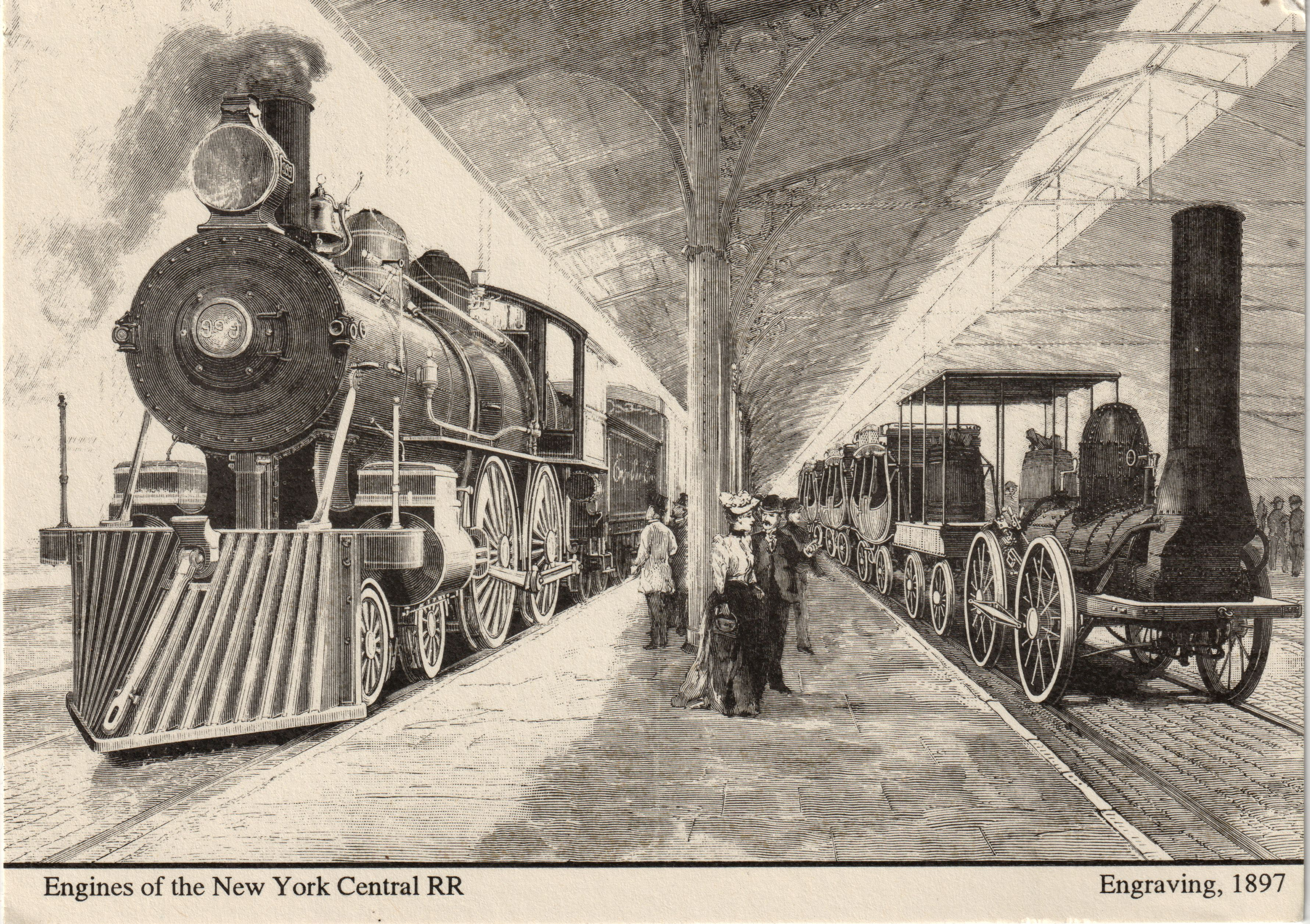
Engines of the New York Central RR, Scientific American Engraving 1897 -- DeWitt Clinton at right

Since its first appearance at the World’s Fair of 1893, the Clinton replica continued to work as an engaging promotional device for the railroad in many subsequent locations until it was purchased by Henry Ford in 1934 with the condition that it still travel periodically to fairs and expositions on behalf of the NYCR. After being purchased by Ford, the replica would continue to make appearances at NYCR fairs, expositions and other promotional events up until the 1950s. The DeWitt Clinton replica, along with the replicas of the Goold cars, has been kept on display at the Henry Ford Museum in Dearborn, Michigan, since its removal from service.

== See also ==
- History of Albany, New York
