= List of New York State legislatures =

The legislature of the U.S. state of New York has convened many times since statehood became effective on July 26, 1788.

== Legislatures ==
Name	Start date	End date	Last election
New York Constitution of 1777
1st New York State Legislature	1777		
2nd New York State Legislature	1778		
3rd New York State Legislature	1779		
4th New York State Legislature	1780		
5th New York State Legislature	1781		
6th New York State Legislature	1782		
7th New York State Legislature	1783		
8th New York State Legislature	1784		
9th New York State Legislature	1785		
10th New York State Legislature	1786		
11th New York State Legislature	1787		
12th New York State Legislature	December 11, 1788	March 3, 1789	April–May 1788
13th New York State Legislature	1789		
14th New York State Legislature	1790		
15th New York State Legislature	1791		
16th New York State Legislature	1792		
17th New York State Legislature	1793		
18th New York State Legislature	1794		
19th New York State Legislature	1795		
20th New York State Legislature	1796		
21st New York State Legislature	1797		
22nd New York State Legislature	1798		
23rd New York State Legislature	1799		
24th New York State Legislature	1800		
25th New York State Legislature	1801		
26th New York State Legislature	1802		
27th New York State Legislature	1803		
28th New York State Legislature	1804		
29th New York State Legislature	1805		
30th New York State Legislature	1806		
31st New York State Legislature	1807		
32nd New York State Legislature	1808		
33rd New York State Legislature	1809		
34th New York State Legislature	1810		
35th New York State Legislature	1811		
36th New York State Legislature	1812		
37th New York State Legislature	1813		
38th New York State Legislature	1814		
39th New York State Legislature	1815		
40th New York State Legislature	1816		
41st New York State Legislature	1817		
42nd New York State Legislature	1818		
43rd New York State Legislature	1819		
44th New York State Legislature	1820		
45th New York State Legislature	1821		
New York Constitution of 1821
46th New York State Legislature	1823		
47th New York State Legislature	1824		
48th New York State Legislature	1825		
49th New York State Legislature	1826		
50th New York State Legislature	1827		
51st New York State Legislature	1828		
52nd New York State Legislature	1829		
53rd New York State Legislature	1830		
54th New York State Legislature	1831		
55th New York State Legislature	1832		
56th New York State Legislature	1833		
57th New York State Legislature	1834		
58th New York State Legislature	1835		
59th New York State Legislature	1836		
60th New York State Legislature	1837		
61st New York State Legislature	1838		
62nd New York State Legislature	1839		
63rd New York State Legislature	1840		
64th New York State Legislature	1841		
65th New York State Legislature	1842		
66th New York State Legislature	1843		
67th New York State Legislature	1844		
68th New York State Legislature	1845		
69th New York State Legislature	1846		
New York Constitution of 1846
70th New York State Legislature	1847		
71st New York State Legislature	1848		
72nd New York State Legislature	1849		
73rd New York State Legislature	1850		
74th New York State Legislature	1851		
75th New York State Legislature	1852		
76th New York State Legislature	1853		
77th New York State Legislature	1854		
78th New York State Legislature	1855		
79th New York State Legislature	1856		
80th New York State Legislature	1857		
81st New York State Legislature	1858		
82nd New York State Legislature	1859		
83rd New York State Legislature	1860		
84th New York State Legislature	1861		
85th New York State Legislature	1862		
86th New York State Legislature	1863		
87th New York State Legislature	1864		
88th New York State Legislature	1865		
89th New York State Legislature	1866		
90th New York State Legislature	1867		
91st New York State Legislature	1868		
92nd New York State Legislature	1869		
93rd New York State Legislature	1870		
94th New York State Legislature	1871		
95th New York State Legislature	1872		
96th New York State Legislature	1873		
97th New York State Legislature	1874		
98th New York State Legislature	1875		
99th New York State Legislature	1876		
100th New York State Legislature	1877		
101st New York State Legislature	1878		
102nd New York State Legislature	1879		
103rd New York State Legislature	1880		
104th New York State Legislature	1881		
105th New York State Legislature	1882		
106th New York State Legislature	1883		
107th New York State Legislature	1884		
108th New York State Legislature	1885		
109th New York State Legislature	1886		
110th New York State Legislature	1887		
111th New York State Legislature	1888		
112th New York State Legislature	1889		
113th New York State Legislature	1890		
114th New York State Legislature	1891		
115th New York State Legislature	1892		
116th New York State Legislature	1893		
117th New York State Legislature	1894		
New York Constitution of 1894
118th New York State Legislature	1895		
119th New York State Legislature	1896		
120th New York State Legislature	1897		
121st New York State Legislature	1898		
122nd New York State Legislature	1899		
123rd New York State Legislature	1900		
124th New York State Legislature	1901		
125th New York State Legislature	1902		
126th New York State Legislature	1903		
127th New York State Legislature	1904		
128th New York State Legislature	1905		
129th New York State Legislature	1906		
130th New York State Legislature	1907		
131st New York State Legislature	1908		
132nd New York State Legislature	1909		
133rd New York State Legislature	1910		
134th New York State Legislature	1911		
135th New York State Legislature	1912		
136th New York State Legislature	1913		
137th New York State Legislature	1914		
138th New York State Legislature	1915		
139th New York State Legislature	1916		
140th New York State Legislature	1917		
141st New York State Legislature	1918		
142nd New York State Legislature	1919		
143rd New York State Legislature	1920		
144th New York State Legislature	1921		
145th New York State Legislature	1922		
146th New York State Legislature	1923		
147th New York State Legislature	1924		
148th New York State Legislature	1925		
149th New York State Legislature	1926		
150th New York State Legislature	1927		
151st New York State Legislature	1928		
152nd New York State Legislature	1929		
153rd New York State Legislature	1930		
154th New York State Legislature	1931		
155th New York State Legislature	1932		
156th New York State Legislature	1933		
157th New York State Legislature	1934		
158th New York State Legislature	1935		
159th New York State Legislature	1936		
160th New York State Legislature	1937		
161st New York State Legislature	1938		
162nd New York State Legislature	1939		
163rd New York State Legislature	1941		
164th New York State Legislature	1942		
165th New York State Legislature	1944		
166th New York State Legislature	1947		
167th New York State Legislature	1949		
168th New York State Legislature	1951		
169th New York State Legislature	1953		
170th New York State Legislature	1955		
171st New York State Legislature	1957		
172nd New York State Legislature	1959		
173rd New York State Legislature	1961		
174th New York State Legislature	1963		
175th New York State Legislature	1965		
176th New York State Legislature	1966		
177th New York State Legislature	1967		
178th New York State Legislature	1969		
179th New York State Legislature	1971		
180th New York State Legislature	1973		
181st New York State Legislature	1975		
182nd New York State Legislature	1977		
183rd New York State Legislature	1979		
184th New York State Legislature	1981		
185th New York State Legislature	1983		
186th New York State Legislature	1985		
187th New York State Legislature	1987		
188th New York State Legislature	1989		
189th New York State Legislature	1991		
190th New York State Legislature	1993		
191st New York State Legislature	1995		
192nd New York State Legislature	1997		
193rd New York State Legislature	1999		
194th New York State Legislature	2001		
195th New York State Legislature	2003		
196th New York State Legislature	2005		
197th New York State Legislature	2007		
198th New York State Legislature	2009		November: 2008 New York State legislative elections
199th New York State Legislature	2011		November 2010: Senate
200th New York State Legislature	2013		November 2012: House, Senate
201st New York State Legislature	2015		November 2014: House, Senate
202nd New York State Legislature	2017		November 2016: House, Senate
203rd New York State Legislature	2019		November 2018: House, Senate
204th New York State Legislature	2021		November 2020: House, Senate
205th	January 4, 2023		November 2022: House, Senate
206th	2025		November 5, 2024: House, Senate

== See also ==
- List of speakers of the New York State Assembly
- List of majority leaders of the New York State Senate
- List of governors of New York
- Politics of New York State
- New York State Capitol
- Lists of United States state legislative sessions
