= 19th New York State Legislature =

New York state legislative session

←	18th	20th	→
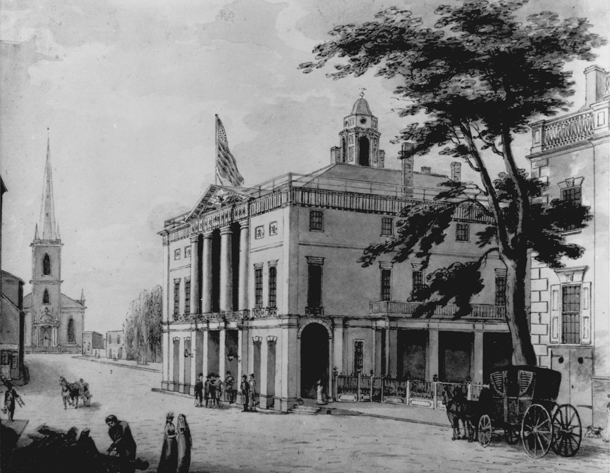
- The Old New York City Hall, where the Legislature first met in 1784. From January 1785 to August 1790, the Congress of the Confederation and the 1st United States Congress met here, and the building was renamed Federal Hall. From 1791 to 1793, and from 1795 to 1796, the State Legislature met again here. The building was demolished in 1812. (1798)

Overview
- Legislative body: New York State Legislature
- Jurisdiction: New York, United States
- Term: July 1, 1795 – June 30, 1796

Senate
- Members: 24
- President: Lt. Gov. Stephen Van Rensselaer (Fed.)
- Party control: Federalist (14-9)

Assembly
- Members: 70
- Speaker: William North (Fed.)
- Party control: Federalist

Sessions
- 1st: January 6, 1796 – April 11, 1796

The 19th New York State Legislature, consisting of the New York State Senate and the New York State Assembly, met from January 6 to April 11, 1796, during the first year of John Jay's governorship, in New York City.

== Background ==
Under the provisions of the New York Constitution of 1777, the state senators were elected on general tickets in the senatorial districts, and were then divided into four classes. Six senators each drew lots for a term of 1, 2, 3 or 4 years and, beginning at the election in April 1778, every year six Senate seats came up for election to a four-year term. Assemblymen were elected countywide on general tickets to a one-year term, the whole assembly being renewed annually.

In March 1786, the legislature enacted that future legislatures meet on the first Tuesday of January of each year unless called earlier by the governor. No general meeting place was determined, leaving it to each Legislature to name the place where to reconvene, and if no place could be agreed upon, the legislature should meet again where it adjourned.

On February 7, 1791, the legislature had re-apportioned the Senate and Assembly districts, according to the figures of the 1790 United States census.

Matthew Clarkson resigned, leaving a vacancy in the Southern District; and John Williams was elected to Congress, leaving a vacancy in the Eastern District.

At this time the politicians were divided into two opposing political parties: the Federalists and the Democratic-Republicans.

== Elections ==
The State election was held from April 28 to 30, 1795. U.S. Chief Justice John Jay was elected Governor; and State Senator Stephen Van Rensselaer was elected Lieutenant Governor; both were Federalists.

Senators Samuel Jones, Joshua Sands (both Southern D.), Thomas Tillotson (Middle D.) and Philip Schuyler (Western D.) were re-elected. Abraham Schenck (Middle D.) and Ebenezer Russell (Eastern D.) were also elected to full terms in the Senate. Philip Livingston (Southern D.) and Ambrose Spencer (Eastern D.) were elected to fill the vacancies.

== Sessions ==
The legislature was to meet at Federal Hall in New York City on January 5, 1796, but assembled a quorum only the next day. Both houses adjourned on April 11.

William North was re-elected Speaker with a vote of 29 against 18 for James Watson; both were Federalists.

On February 12, 1796, the legislature divided the State into seven districts, in each of which an Assistant Attorney General was to be the principal prosecuting officer, instead of the Attorney General and his deputy who had prosecuted statewide. The Attorney General continued to prosecute personally in New York City; the original Assistant Attorneys General appointed were: Nathaniel Lawrence, Jacob Radcliff, Ambrose Spencer, Anthony I. Blanchard, Abraham Van Vechten, William Stuart and Thomas R. Gold.

On March 4, 1796, the Legislature re-apportioned the Senate and Assembly districts, based on the figures of the New York State Census of 1795. The number of state senators was increased from 24 to 43; the number of assemblymen was increased from 70 to 108; the two-county Assembly districts were dismembered, and several new counties were created.

== State Senate ==
=== Districts ===
- The Southern District (8 seats) consisted of Kings, New York, Queens, Richmond, Suffolk and Westchester counties.
- The Middle District (6 seats) consisted of Dutchess, Orange and Ulster counties.
- The Eastern District (5 seats) consisted of Washington, Clinton, Columbia and Rensselaer counties.
- The Western District (5 seats) consisted of Albany, Montgomery, Herkimer, Ontario, Otsego, Saratoga, Tioga, Onondaga and Schoharie counties.

Note: There are now 62 counties in the State of New York. The counties which are not mentioned in this list had not yet been established, or sufficiently organized, the area being included in one or more of the abovementioned counties.

=== Members ===
The asterisk (*) denotes members of the previous Legislature who continued in office as members of this Legislature.

District	Senators	Term left	Party	Notes
Southern	Henry Cruger*	1 year	Federalist	
Southern	John Schenck*	1 year	Dem.-Rep.	
Southern	Selah Strong*	1 year	Federalist	
Southern	Ezra L'Hommedieu*	2 years	Federalist	
Southern	Philip Livingston	3 years	Federalist	elected to fill vacancy, in place of Matthew Clarkson
Southern	Richard Hatfield*	3 years	Federalist	
Southern	Samuel Jones*	4 years	Federalist	also Recorder of New York City
Southern	Joshua Sands*	4 years	Federalist	elected to the Council of Appointment
Middle	Joseph Hasbrouck*	1 year	Dem.-Rep.	
Middle	John Cantine*	2 years	Dem.-Rep.	
Middle	Reuben Hopkins*	2 years	Dem.-Rep.	
Middle	John D. Coe*	3 years	Dem.-Rep.	
Middle	Abraham Schenck	4 years	Dem.-Rep.	elected to the Council of Appointment
Middle	Thomas Tillotson*	4 years	Dem.-Rep.	
Eastern	John Livingston*	1 year	Dem.-Rep.	
Eastern	Robert Woodworth*	1 year	Dem.-Rep.	
Eastern	Zina Hitchcock*	2 years	Federalist	
Eastern	Ambrose Spencer	3 years	Federalist	elected to fill vacancy, in place of John Williams; from February 23, 1796, also Assistant Attorney General (3rd D.)
Eastern	Ebenezer Russell	4 years	Federalist	elected to the Council of Appointment
Western	Michael Myers*	2 years	Federalist	elected to the Council of Appointment
Western	Jacobus Van Schoonhoven*	2 years	Federalist	
Western	John Frey*	3 years	Federalist	
Western	vacant	3 years		Stephen Van Rensselaer was elected Lt. Gov.
Western	Philip Schuyler*	4 years	Federalist	

=== Employees ===
- Clerk: Abraham B. Bancker

== State Assembly ==
=== Districts ===
- Albany and Schoharie counties (7 seats)
- Columbia County (6 seats)
- Dutchess County (7 seats)
- Herkimer and Onondaga counties (1 seat)
- Kings County (1 seat)
- Montgomery County) (4 seats)
- The City and County of New York (7 seats)
- Ontario County (1 seat)
- Orange County (3 seats)
- Otsego County (1 seat)
- Queens County (3 seats)
- Rensselaer County (5 seats)
- Richmond County (1 seat)
- Saratoga County (4 seats)
- Suffolk County (4 seats)
- Tioga County (1 seat)
- Ulster County (5 seats)
- Washington and Clinton counties (4 seats)
- Westchester County (5 seats)

Note: There are now 62 counties in the State of New York. The counties which are not mentioned in this list had not yet been established, or sufficiently organized, the area being included in one or more of the abovementioned counties.

=== Assemblymen ===
The asterisk (*) denotes members of the previous Legislature who continued as members of this Legislature.

County	Assemblymen	Party	Notes
Albany and Schoharie	Gerrit Abeel		
Albany and Schoharie	Leonard Bronck	Federalist	
Albany and Schoharie	Johannes Dietz*	Federalist	
Albany and Schoharie	Jacob Hochstrasser*		
Albany and Schoharie	Francis Nicoll	Federalist	
Albany and Schoharie	William North*	Federalist	re-elected Speaker
Albany and Schoharie	Dirck Ten Broeck	Federalist	
Columbia	Benjamin Birdsall		
Columbia	James Brebner*		
Columbia	Patrick Hamilton		
Columbia	Stephen Hogeboom		
Columbia	Philip L. Hoffman	Dem.-Rep.	
Columbia	Samuel Ten Broeck		
Dutchess	David Brooks*	Federalist	
Dutchess	Richard Davis		
Dutchess	Jesse Oakley*	Federalist	
Dutchess	Jacob Smith*		
Dutchess	Solomon Sutherland		
Dutchess	Jesse Thompson	Federalist	
Dutchess	Isaac Van Wyck*		
Herkimer and Onondaga	Jonas Platt	Federalist	
Kings	Peter Vandervoort*	Federalist	
Montgomery	David Cady		
Montgomery	Lewis Dubois		
Montgomery	Frederick Gettman*	Federalist	
Montgomery	Daniel Mills		
New York	Gabriel Furman	Federalist	
New York	Richard Furman*	Federalist	
New York	Alexander Lamb	Dem.-Rep.	
New York	Jacob Morton	Federalist	
New York	Jotham Post Jr.*	Federalist	
New York	William P. Smith	Federalist	
New York	James Watson*	Federalist	
Ontario	Thomas Morris*	Federalist	
Orange	Seth Marvin		
Orange	David Pye*	Dem.-Rep.	
Orange	James W. Wilkin	Dem.-Rep.	
Otsego	Jacob Morris*	Federalist	
Queens	Stephen Carman*	Federalist	
Queens	Samuel Clowes*		
Queens	Nathaniel Lawrence*	Dem.-Rep.	from February 16, 1796, also Assistant Attorney General (1st D.)
Rensselaer	John Bird	Federalist	
Rensselaer	Daniel Gray*	Federalist	
Rensselaer	Rowland Hall	Federalist	
Rensselaer	Benjamin Hicks*	Federalist	
Rensselaer	John Knickerbacker Jr.	Federalist	
Richmond	Lewis Ryerss*		
Saratoga	John Bleecker		
Saratoga	Adam Comstock*	Dem.-Rep.	
Saratoga	John McClelland		
Saratoga	Elias Palmer		
Suffolk	Jared Landon		
Suffolk	Abraham Miller		
Suffolk	Joshua Smith Jr.*		
Suffolk	Silas Wood	Federalist	
Tioga	Emanuel Coryell	Federalist	
Ulster	John Addison	Dem.-Rep.	
Ulster	Philip D. Bevier	Dem.-Rep.	
Ulster	Ebenezer Foote	Federalist	
Ulster	Andrew McCord	Dem.-Rep.	
Ulster	James Oliver	Federalist	
Washington and Clinton	David Hopkins*	Dem.-Rep.	
Washington and Clinton	Timothy Leonard		
Washington and Clinton	Edward Savage*	Dem.-Rep.	
Washington and Clinton	Thomas Smith		
Westchester	Joseph Carpenter	Federalist	
Westchester	Mordecai Hale	Federalist	
Westchester	Elias Newman		
Westchester	Abel Smith*		
Westchester	Charles Teed	Federalist	

=== Employees ===
- Clerk: Oliver L. Ker
- Sergeant-at-Arms: Robert Hunter
- Doorkeeper: Richard Ten Eyck

== Sources ==
- The New York Civil List compiled by Franklin Benjamin Hough (Weed, Parsons and Co., 1858) [see pg. 108 for Senate districts; pg. 115f for senators; pg. 148f for Assembly districts; pg. 169f for assemblymen]
- Election result Assembly, Dutchess Co. at project "A New Nation Votes", compiled by Phil Lampi, hosted by Tufts University Digital Library
- Election result Assembly, New York Co. at project "A New Nation Votes"
- Election result Assembly, Otsego Co. at project "A New Nation Votes"
- Election result Assembly, Rensselaer Co. at project "A New Nation Votes"
- Election result Assembly, Ulster Co. at project "A New Nation Votes"
