= 18th New York State Legislature =

New York state legislative session

←	17th	19th	→
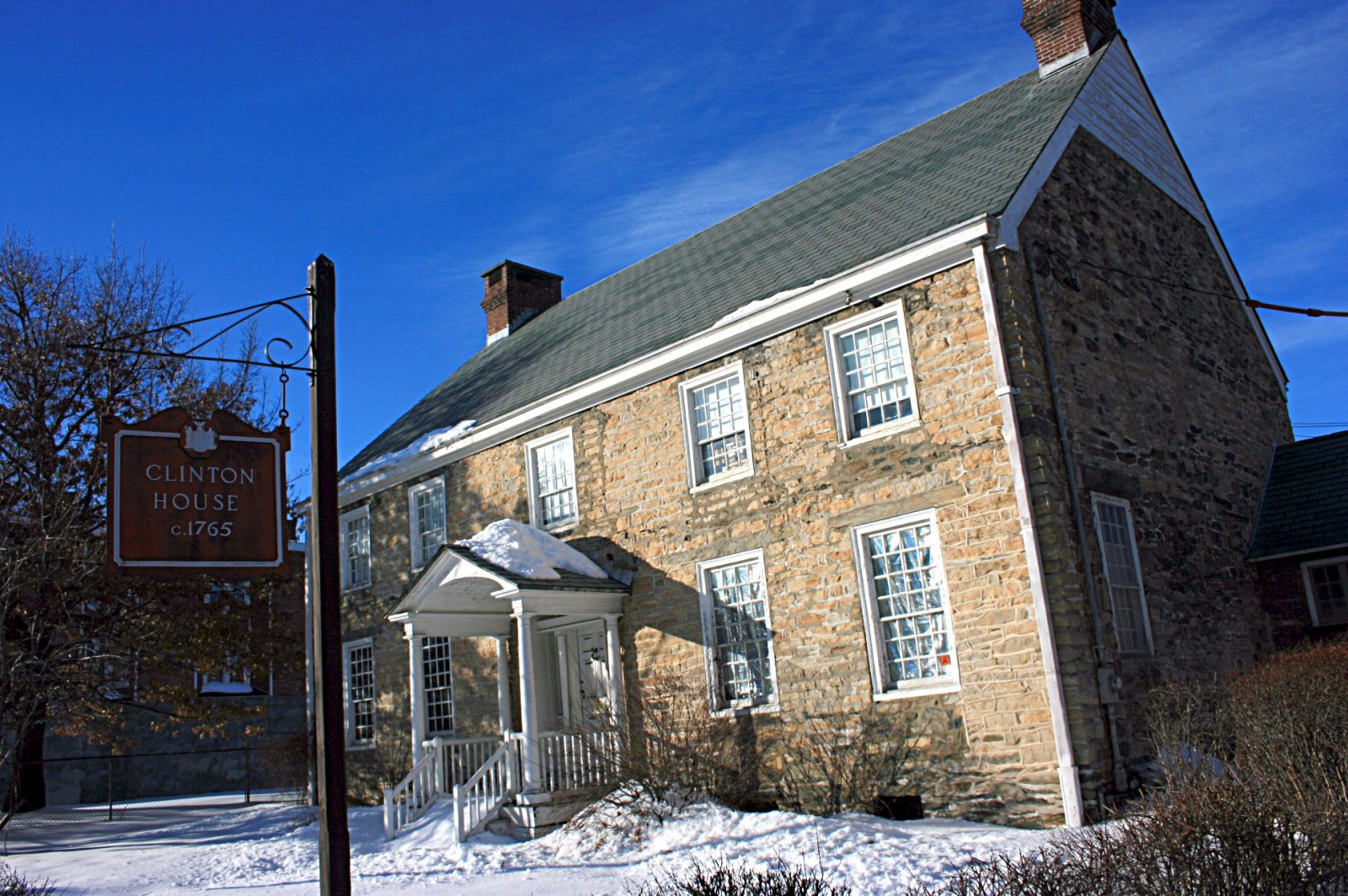
- Clinton House, one of the buildings used by the State government during sessions at Poughkeepsie (2007)

Overview
- Legislative body: New York State Legislature
- Jurisdiction: New York, United States
- Term: July 1, 1794 – June 30, 1795

Senate
- Members: 24
- President: Lt. Gov. Pierre Van Cortlandt
- Party control: Federalist (14-10)

Assembly
- Members: 70
- Speaker: William North (Fed.)
- Party control: Federalist

Sessions
- 1st: January 6, 1795 – January 14, 1795
- 2nd: January 20, 1795 – April 9, 1795

The 18th New York State Legislature, consisting of the New York State Senate and the New York State Assembly, met from January 6 to April 9, 1795, during the eighteenth year of George Clinton's governorship, first in Poughkeepsie, then in New York City.

== Background ==
Under the provisions of the New York Constitution of 1777, the state senators were elected on general tickets in the senatorial districts, and were then divided into four classes. Six senators each drew lots for a term of 1, 2, 3 or 4 years and, beginning at the election in April 1778, every year six Senate seats came up for election to a four-year term. Assemblymen were elected countywide on general tickets to a one-year term, the whole assembly being renewed annually.

In March 1786, the legislature enacted that future legislatures meet on the first Tuesday of January of each year unless called earlier by the governor. No general meeting place was determined, leaving it to each Legislature to name the place where to reconvene, and if no place could be agreed upon, the legislature should meet again where it adjourned.

On February 7, 1791, the legislature re-apportioned the Senate and Assembly districts, according to the figures of the 1790 United States census.

At this time the politicians were divided into two opposing political parties: the Federalists and the Democratic-Republicans.

== Elections ==
The State election was held from April 29 to May 1, 1794. Senators Matthew Clarkson (Southern D.), John Williams (Eastern D.), John Frey and Stephen Van Rensselaer (both Western D.) were re-elected. Assemblymen Richard Hatfield (Southern D.) and John D. Coe (Middle D.) were also elected to the Senate.

== Sessions ==
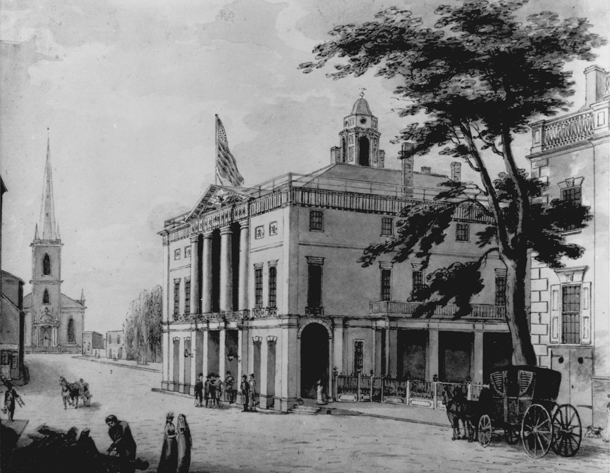
The Old New York City Hall, where the Legislature met in 1784. From January 1785 to August 1790, the Congress of the Confederation and the 1st United States Congress met here, and the building was renamed Federal Hall. From 1791 to 1793, and from 1795 to 1796, the State Legislature met again here. The building was demolished in 1812.

The legislature met first in Poughkeepsie on January 6; and adjourned on January 14, 1795. The legislature met again at Federal Hall in New York City on January 20; and adjourned on April 9.

William North was elected Speaker with 33 votes to 28 for James Watson, the Speaker of the previous Assembly, both were Federalists. The average vote for the members of the Council of Appointment was 36 to 29, showing a Federalist majority of 7.

On January 27, the Legislature re-elected Federalist Rufus King to the U.S. Senate.

== State Senate ==
=== Districts ===
- The Southern District (8 seats) consisted of Kings, New York, Queens, Richmond, Suffolk and Westchester counties.
- The Middle District (6 seats) consisted of Dutchess, Orange and Ulster counties.
- The Eastern District (5 seats) consisted of Washington, Clinton, Columbia and Rensselaer counties.
- The Western District (5 seats) consisted of Albany, Montgomery, Herkimer, Ontario, Otsego, Saratoga, Tioga and Onondaga counties.

Note: There are now 62 counties in the State of New York. The counties which are not mentioned in this list had not yet been established, or sufficiently organized, the area being included in one or more of the abovementioned counties.

=== Members ===
The asterisk (*) denotes members of the previous Legislature who continued in office as members of this Legislature. Richard Hatfield and John D. Coe changed from the Assembly to the Senate.

District	Senators	Term left	Party	Notes
Southern	Samuel Jones*	1 year	Federalist	also Recorder of New York City
Southern	Joshua Sands*	1 year	Federalist	
Southern	Henry Cruger*	2 years	Federalist	
Southern	John Schenck*	2 years	Dem.-Rep.	
Southern	Selah Strong*	2 years	Federalist	
Southern	Ezra L'Hommedieu*	3 years	Federalist	
Southern	Matthew Clarkson*	4 years	Federalist	
Southern	Richard Hatfield*	4 years	Federalist	elected to the Council of Appointment
Middle	Thomas Tillotson*	1 year	Dem.-Rep.	
Middle	Jacobus Swartwout*	1 year	Dem.-Rep.	
Middle	Joseph Hasbrouck*	2 years	Dem.-Rep.	elected to the Council of Appointment
Middle	John Cantine*	3 years	Dem.-Rep.	
Middle	Reuben Hopkins*	3 years	Dem.-Rep.	
Middle	John D. Coe*	4 years	Dem.-Rep.	
Eastern	William Powers*	1 year	Federalist	elected to the Council of Appointment
Eastern	John Livingston*	2 years	Dem.-Rep.	
Eastern	Robert Woodworth*	2 years	Dem.-Rep.	
Eastern	Zina Hitchcock*	3 years	Federalist	
Eastern	John Williams*	4 years	Dem.-Rep.	elected in December 1794 to the 4th United States Congress
Western	Philip Schuyler*	1 year	Federalist	
Western	Michael Myers*	3 years	Federalist	
Western	Jacobus Van Schoonhoven*	3 years	Federalist	elected to the Council of Appointment
Western	John Frey*	4 years	Federalist	
Western	Stephen Van Rensselaer*	4 years	Federalist	

=== Employees ===
- Clerk: Abraham B. Bancker

== State Assembly ==
=== Districts ===
- The City and County of Albany (7 seats)
- Columbia County (6 seats)
- Dutchess County (7 seats)
- Herkimer and Onondaga counties (1 seat)
- Kings County (1 seat)
- Montgomery County (4 seats)
- The City and County of New York (7 seats)
- Ontario County (1 seat)
- Orange County (3 seats)
- Otsego County (1 seat)
- Queens County (3 seats)
- Rensselaer County (5 seats)
- Richmond County (1 seat)
- Saratoga County (4 seats)
- Suffolk County (4 seats)
- Tioga County (1 seat)
- Ulster County (5 seats)
- Washington and Clinton counties (4 seats)
- Westchester County (5 seats)

Note: There are now 62 counties in the State of New York. The counties which are not mentioned in this list had not yet been established, or sufficiently organized, the area being included in one or more of the abovementioned counties.

=== Assemblymen ===
The asterisk (*) denotes members of the previous Legislature who continued as members of this Legislature. David Pye changed from the Senate to the Assembly.

County	Assemblymen	Party	Notes
Albany	Johannes Dietz*	Federalist	
Albany	Leonard Gansevoort Jr.		
Albany	Jacob Hochstrasser*		
Albany	Thomas Hun*		
Albany	William North*	Federalist	elected Speaker
Albany	Stephen Platt*		
Albany	Andries Van Patten		
Columbia	Matthew Adgate*	Dem.-Rep.	
Columbia	John Bay*	Dem.-Rep.	
Columbia	James Brebner*		
Columbia	Philip L. Hoffman		
Columbia	Elisha Jenkins	Dem.-Rep.	
Columbia	Matthew Scott*		
Dutchess	Samuel A. Barker*	Federalist	
Dutchess	Jacob Bockée*?		
Dutchess	David Brooks*	Federalist	
Dutchess	Jesse Oakley*		
Dutchess	Jacob Radclift*		
Dutchess	Jacob Smith		
Dutchess	Isaac Van Wyck*		
Herkimer and Onondaga	Jedediah Sanger*		
Kings	Peter Vandervoort*	Federalist	
Montgomery	Douw Fonda		
Montgomery	Frederick Gettman*		
Montgomery	David McMasters		
Montgomery	Simon Veeder*		
New York	Nicholas Cruger		
New York	John DeLancey*		
New York	Richard Furman*	Federalist	
New York	Josiah Ogden Hoffman*	Federalist	
New York	James M. Hughes		
New York	Jotham Post Jr.*	Federalist	
New York	James Watson*	Federalist	
Ontario	Thomas Morris*	Federalist	
Orange	William Allison		
Orange	John Hathorn	Dem.-Rep.	
Orange	David Pye*	Dem.-Rep.	
Otsego	Jacob Morris	Federalist	
Queens	Stephen Carman		
Queens	Samuel Clowes*		
Queens	Nathaniel Lawrence	Dem.-Rep.	also New York Attorney General
Rensselaer	Jonathan Brown*	Dem.-Rep.	
Rensselaer	Daniel Gray	Federalist	
Rensselaer	Benjamin Hicks*	Federalist	
Rensselaer	Hosea Moffitt*	Federalist	
Rensselaer	Jacob C. Schermerhorn		
Richmond	Lewis Ryerss		
Saratoga	Adam Comstock*	Dem.-Rep.	
Saratoga	Jabez Davis		
Saratoga	Beriah Palmer*	Dem.-Rep.	
Saratoga	John B. Schuyler		
Suffolk	John Gelston*		
Suffolk	Jonathan N. Havens*	Dem.-Rep.	elected in April 1794 to the 4th United States Congress
Suffolk	Joshua Smith Jr.		
Suffolk	Isaac Thompson		
Tioga	Vincent Mathews*	Federalist	
Ulster	(Severyn T. Bruyn)	Dem.-Rep.	died September 1794, before the Legislature met
Ulster	John C. DeWitt	Dem.-Rep.	
Ulster	Andrew McCord	Dem.-Rep.	
Ulster	Cornelius C. Schoonmaker	Dem.-Rep.	
Ulster	(Jacob W. Tremper)	Dem.-Rep.	died October 8, 1794, before the Legislature met
Washington and Clinton	Samuel Beman Jr.		
Washington and Clinton	Benjamin Colvin*		
Washington and Clinton	David Hopkins	Dem.-Rep.	
Washington and Clinton	Edward Savage	Dem.-Rep.	
Westchester	Thomas Bowne		
Westchester	Ebenezer Purdy		
Westchester	Abel Smith*		
Westchester	Pierre Van Cortlandt Jr.*	Dem.-Rep.	
Westchester	Ebenezer White*		

=== Employees ===
- Clerk: Oliver L. Ker
- Doorkeeper: Richard Ten Eyck

== Sources ==
- The New York Civil List compiled by Franklin Benjamin Hough (Weed, Parsons and Co., 1858) [see pg. 108 for Senate districts; pg. 115 for senators; pg. 148f for Assembly districts; pg. 168f for assemblymen]
- Election result Assembly, Dutchess Co. at project "A New Nation Votes", compiled by Phil Lampi, hosted by Tufts University Digital Library
- Election result Assembly, Rensselaer Co. at project "A New Nation Votes"
- Election result Assembly, Ulster Co. at project "A New Nation Votes"
- Election result Assembly, Westchester Co. at project "A New Nation Votes"
