= 17th New York State Legislature =

New York state legislative session

←	16th	18th	→
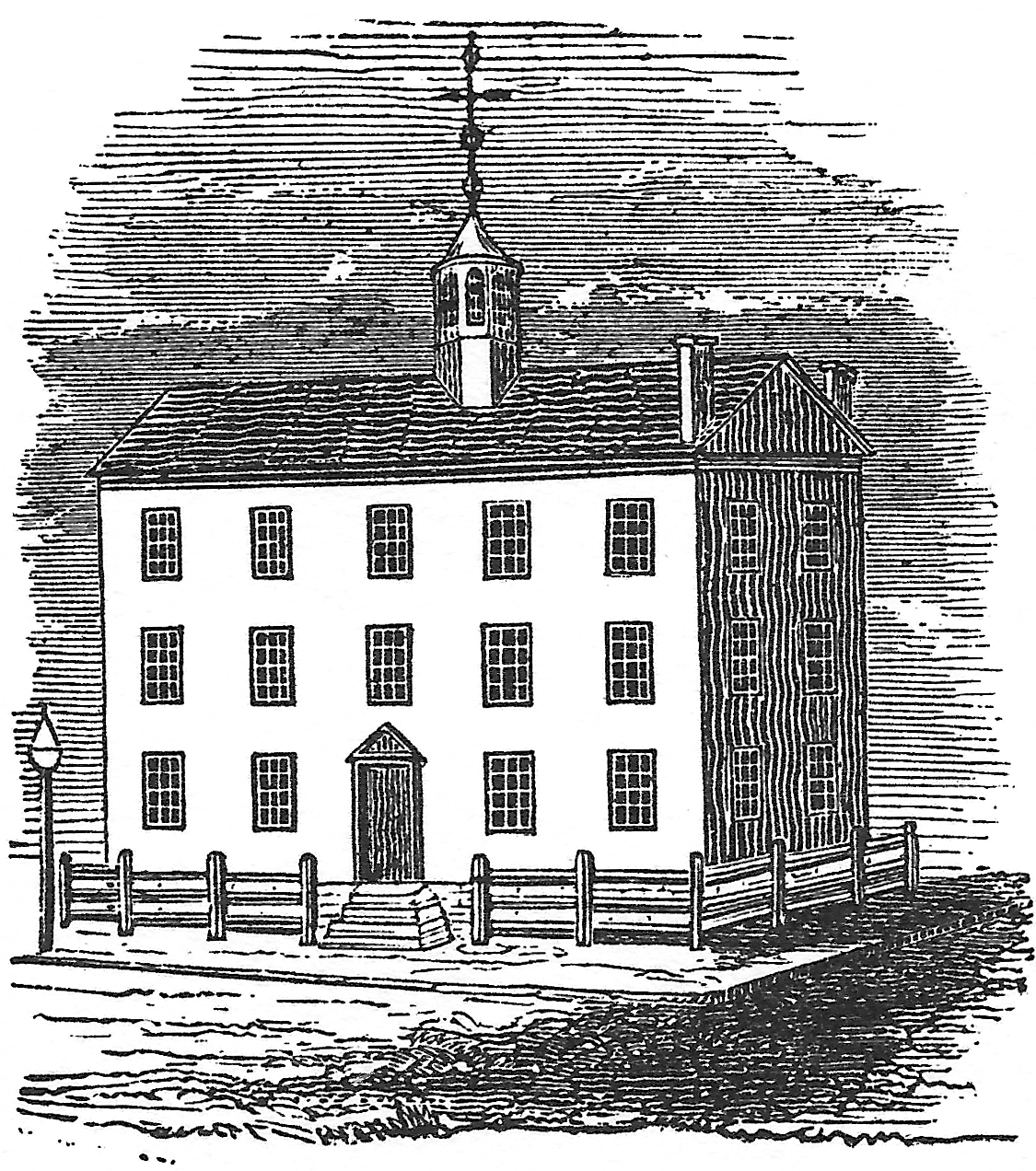
- The Old Albany City Hall, where the Legislature met again in 1794 (undated)

Overview
- Legislative body: New York State Legislature
- Jurisdiction: New York, United States
- Term: July 1, 1793 – June 30, 1794

Senate
- Members: 24
- President: Lt. Gov. Pierre Van Cortlandt
- Party control: Federalist (13-11)

Assembly
- Members: 70
- Speaker: James Watson (Fed.)
- Party control: Federalist

Sessions
- 1st: January 7, 1794 – March 27, 1794

The 17th New York State Legislature, consisting of the New York State Senate and the New York State Assembly, met from January 7 to March 27, 1794, during the seventeenth year of George Clinton's governorship, in Albany.

== Background ==
Under the provisions of the New York Constitution of 1777, the State Senators were elected on general tickets in the senatorial districts, and were then divided into four classes. Six senators each drew lots for a term of 1, 2, 3 or 4 years and, beginning at the election in April 1778, every year six Senate seats came up for election to a four-year term. Assemblymen were elected countywide on general tickets to a one-year term, the whole assembly being renewed annually.

In March 1786, the Legislature enacted that future Legislatures meet on the first Tuesday of January of each year unless called earlier by the governor. No general meeting place was determined, leaving it to each Legislature to name the place where to reconvene, and if no place could be agreed upon, the Legislature should meet again where it adjourned.

On February 7, 1791, the Legislature re-apportioned the Senate and Assembly districts, according to the figures of the 1790 United States census.

State Senator Philip Van Cortlandt was elected in January 1793 to the 3rd United States Congress, leaving a vacancy in the Southern District.

At this time the politicians were divided into two opposing political parties: the Federalists and the Democratic-Republicans.

== Elections ==
The State election was held from April 30 to May 2, 1793. Senator John Cantine (Middle D.) was re-elected. Ezra L'Hommedieu (Southern D.), Jacobus Van Schoonhoven (Western D.), and Assemblymen Reuben Hopkins (Middle D.), Zina Hitchcock (Eastern D.) and Michael Myers (Western D.) were elected to full terms in the Senate. Matthew Clarkson was elected to fill the vacancy in the Southern District.

== Sessions ==
The Legislature met at the Old City Hall in Albany on January 7; and adjourned on March 27, 1794.

On January 7, 1794, John McKesson, Clerk of the Assembly since 1777, was voted out of office. Oliver L. Ker, of New York City, was elected with 37 votes against 21 for McKesson.

== State Senate ==
=== Districts ===
- The Southern District (8 seats) consisted of Kings, New York, Queens, Richmond, Suffolk and Westchester counties.
- The Middle District (6 seats) consisted of Dutchess, Orange and Ulster counties.
- The Eastern District (5 seats) consisted of Washington, Clinton, Columbia and Rensselaer counties.
- The Western District (5 seats) consisted of Albany, Montgomery, Herkimer, Ontario, Otsego, Saratoga and Tioga counties.

Note: There are now 62 counties in the State of New York. The counties which are not mentioned in this list had not yet been established, or sufficiently organized, the area being included in one or more of the abovementioned counties.

=== Members ===
The asterisk (*) denotes members of the previous Legislature who continued in office as members of this Legislature. Reuben Hopkins, Zina Hitchcock, Michael Myers changed from the Assembly to the Senate.

District	Senators	Term left	Party	Notes
Southern	David Gelston*	1 year	Dem.-Rep.	also Surrogate of New York County
Southern	Matthew Clarkson	1 year	Federalist	elected to fill vacancy, in place of Philip Van Cortlandt
Southern	Samuel Jones*	2 years	Federalist	also Recorder of New York City
Southern	Joshua Sands*	2 years	Federalist	
Southern	Henry Cruger*	3 years	Federalist	
Southern	John Schenck*	3 years	Dem.-Rep.	
Southern	Selah Strong*	3 years	Federalist	elected to the Council of Appointment
Southern	Ezra L'Hommedieu	4 years	Federalist	
Middle	David Pye*	1 year	Dem.-Rep.	
Middle	Thomas Tillotson*	2 years	Dem.-Rep.	
Middle	Jacobus Swartwout*	2 years	Dem.-Rep.	
Middle	Joseph Hasbrouck*	3 years	Dem.-Rep.	
Middle	John Cantine*	4 years	Dem.-Rep.	
Middle	Reuben Hopkins*	4 years	Dem.-Rep.	elected to the Council of Appointment
Eastern	John Williams*	1 year	Dem.-Rep.	elected in April 1794 to the 4th United States Congress
Eastern	William Powers*	2 years	Federalist	
Eastern	John Livingston*	3 years	Dem.-Rep.	
Eastern	Robert Woodworth*	3 years	Dem.-Rep.	
Eastern	Zina Hitchcock*	4 years	Federalist	elected to the Council of Appointment
Western	John Frey*	1 year	Federalist	
Western	Stephen Van Rensselaer*	1 year	Federalist	
Western	Philip Schuyler*	2 years	Federalist	elected to the Council of Appointment
Western	Michael Myers*	4 years	Federalist	
Western	Jacobus Van Schoonhoven	4 years	Federalist	

=== Employees ===
- Clerk: Abraham B. Bancker

== State Assembly ==
=== Districts ===
- The City and County of Albany (7 seats)
- Columbia County (6 seats)
- Dutchess County (7 seats)
- Herkimer County (1 seat)
- Kings County (1 seat)
- Montgomery County) (4 seats)
- The City and County of New York (7 seats)
- Ontario County (1 seat)
- Orange County (3 seats)
- Otsego County (1 seat)
- Queens County (3 seats)
- Rensselaer County (5 seats)
- Richmond County (1 seat)
- Saratoga County (4 seats)
- Suffolk County (4 seats)
- Tioga County (1 seat)
- Ulster County (5 seats)
- Washington and Clinton counties (4 seats)
- Westchester County (5 seats)

Note: There are now 62 counties in the State of New York. The counties which are not mentioned in this list had not yet been established, or sufficiently organized, the area being included in one or more of the abovementioned counties.

=== Assemblymen ===
The asterisk (*) denotes members of the previous Legislature who continued as members of this Legislature.

County	Assemblymen	Party	Notes
Albany	Johannes Dietz*	Federalist	
Albany	Jellis A. Fonda*	Federalist	
Albany	Theodorus V. W. Graham		
Albany	Jacob Hochstrasser		
Albany	Thomas Hun		
Albany	William North	Federalist	
Albany	Stephen Platt		
Columbia	Matthew Adgate*	Dem.-Rep.	
Columbia	John Bay	Dem.-Rep.	
Columbia	James Brebner		
Columbia	Dirck Gardiner		
Columbia	Matthew Scott		
Columbia	Ambrose Spencer	Federalist	
Dutchess	Samuel A. Barker	Federalist	
Dutchess	James Bockée		or Jacob Bockée
Dutchess	David Brooks	Federalist	
Dutchess	John DeWitt		
Dutchess	Jesse Oakley		
Dutchess	Jacob Radclift		
Dutchess	Isaac Van Wyck		
Herkimer	Jedediah Sanger	Federalist	
Kings	Peter Vandervoort	Federalist	
Montgomery	Jacob Eaker*		
Montgomery	Frederick Gettman		
Montgomery	John McArthur		
Montgomery	Simon Veeder*		
New York	Robert Boyd		
New York	John DeLancey*		
New York	Richard Furman	Federalist	
New York	Josiah Ogden Hoffman*	Federalist	
New York	Jotham Post Jr.	Federalist	
New York	James Watson	Federalist	elected Speaker
New York	William Willcocks		
Ontario	Thomas Morris	Federalist	
Orange	John D. Coe	Dem.-Rep.	
Orange	Seth Marvin		
Orange	John Wheeler		
Otsego	Benjamin Gilbert	Federalist	
Queens	Samuel Clowes*		
Queens	Harry Peters	Federalist	
Queens	Samuel Youngs		
Rensselaer	Jonathan Brown		
Rensselaer	Benjamin Hicks*	Federalist	
Rensselaer	Hosea Moffitt	Federalist	
Rensselaer	Jonas Odel		
Rensselaer	Thomas Sickles	Dem.-Rep.	
Richmond	Gozen Ryerss*	Federalist	
Saratoga	John Ball		
Saratoga	Adam Comstock*	Dem.-Rep.	
Saratoga	John McClelland		
Saratoga	Beriah Palmer*	Dem.-Rep.	
Suffolk	John Gelston*		
Suffolk	Jonathan N. Havens*	Dem.-Rep.	elected in April 1794 to the 4th United States Congress
Suffolk	John Smith*	Dem.-Rep.	
Suffolk	Joshua Smith Jr.		
Tioga	Vincent Mathews	Federalist	
Ulster	Cornelius Bruyn	Federalist	
Ulster	Conrad E. Elmendorf	Federalist	
Ulster	Ebenezer Foote	Federalist	
Ulster	Johannes Miller	Federalist	
Ulster	James Oliver	Federalist	
Washington and Clinton	Benjamin Colvin		
Washington and Clinton	Philip Smith		
Washington and Clinton	David Thomas	Dem.-Rep.	
Washington and Clinton	William Whiteside		
Westchester	Richard Hatfield*	Federalist	
Westchester	Elias Newman*		
Westchester	Abel Smith		
Westchester	Pierre Van Cortlandt Jr.	Dem.-Rep.	
Westchester	Ebenezer White		

=== Employees ===
- Clerk: Oliver L. Ker
- Sergeant-at-Arms: Robert Hunter
- Doorkeeper: Jacob Kidney

== Sources ==
- The New York Civil List compiled by Franklin Benjamin Hough (Weed, Parsons and Co., 1858) [see pg. 108 for Senate districts; pg. 115 for senators; pg. 148f for Assembly districts; pg. 167f for assemblymen]
- Election result Assembly, Albany Co. at project "A New Nation Votes", compiled by Phil Lampi, hosted by Tufts University Digital Library
- Election result Assembly, Dutchess Co. at project "A New Nation Votes"
- Election result Assembly, Kings Co. at project "A New Nation Votes"
- Election result Assembly, Montgomery Co. at project "A New Nation Votes"
- Election result Assembly, Orange Co. at project "A New Nation Votes"
- Election result Assembly, Otsego Co. at project "A New Nation Votes"
- Election result Assembly, Rensselaer Co. at project "A New Nation Votes"
- Election result Assembly, Richmond Co. at project "A New Nation Votes"
- Election result Assembly, Saratoga Co. at project "A New Nation Votes"
- Election result Assembly, Suffolk Co. at project "A New Nation Votes"
- Election result Assembly, Ulster Co. at project "A New Nation Votes"
- Election result Assembly, Westchester Co. at project "A New Nation Votes"
