= 21st New York State Legislature =

New York state legislative session

←	20th	22nd	→
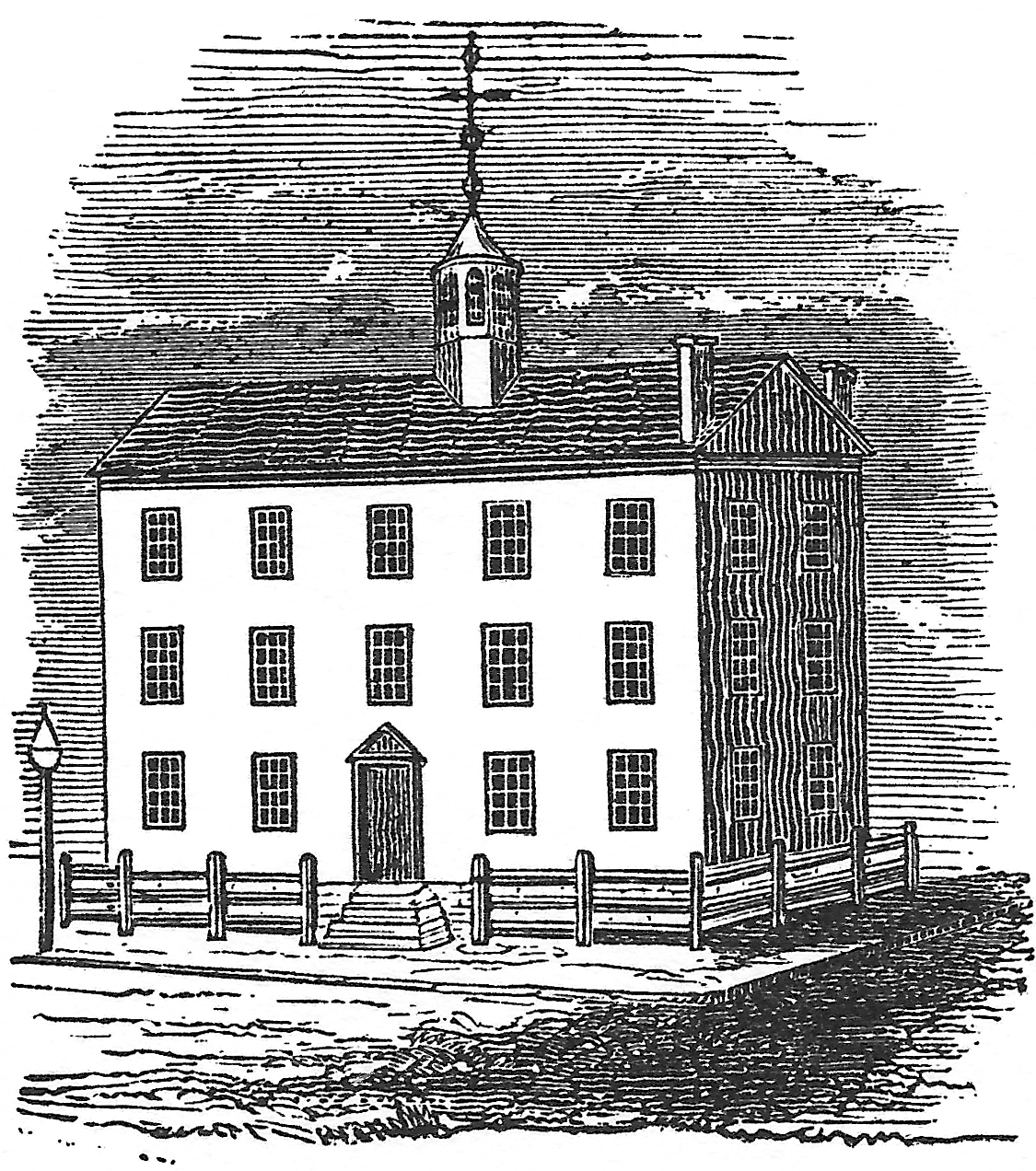
- The Old Albany City Hall (undated)

Overview
- Legislative body: New York State Legislature
- Jurisdiction: New York, United States
- Term: July 1, 1797 – June 30, 1798

Senate
- Members: 43
- President: Lt. Gov. Stephen Van Rensselaer (Fed.)
- Party control: Federalist (33-7)

Assembly
- Members: 108
- Speaker: Dirck Ten Broeck (Fed.)
- Party control: Federalist

Sessions
- 1st: January 2 – April 6, 1798

The 21st New York State Legislature, consisting of the New York State Senate and the New York State Assembly, met from January 2 to April 6, 1798, during the third year of John Jay's governorship, in Albany.

== Background ==
Under the provisions of the New York Constitution of 1777, amended by the re-apportionment of March 4, 1796, Senators were elected on general tickets in the senatorial districts for four-year terms. They were divided into four classes, and every year about one fourth of the Senate seats came up for election. Assemblymen were elected countywide on general tickets to a one-year term, the whole assembly being renewed annually.

In March 1786, the Legislature enacted that future Legislatures meet on the first Tuesday of January of each year unless called earlier by the governor. In 1797, Albany was declared the State capital, and all subsequent Legislatures have been meeting there ever since.

On January 24, 1797, State Senator Philip Schuyler was elected to the U.S. Senate, leaving a vacancy in the Eastern District.

In 1797, Delaware County was created from parts of Ulster and Otsego counties, and was apportioned two seats in the Assembly, one each taken from Ulster and Otsego.

At this time the politicians were divided into two opposing political parties: the Federalists and the Democratic-Republicans.

== Elections ==
The State election was held from April 25 to 27, 1797. Senators Ezra L'Hommedieu (Southern D.), Ebenezer Clark, Anthony Ten Eyck, Jacobus Van Schoonhoven (all three Eastern D.), Thomas Morris and Michael Myers (both Western D.) were re-elected. John Addison, Peter Cantine Jr., James G. Graham (all three Middle D.) and Seth Phelps (Western D.) were also elected to full terms in the Senate. Senator Zina Hitchcock (Eastern D.) was re-elected, but only to a two-year term to fill the vacancy.

== Sessions ==
The Legislature met on January 2, 1798, at the Old City Hall in Albany, New York; the Senate adjourned on April 5, the Assembly on April 6.

Federalist Dirck Ten Broeck was elected Speaker with 59 votes against 42 for Dem.-Rep. William Denning.

On January 3, 1798, Philip Schuyler (Fed.) resigned from the U.S. Senate. On January 11, the Legislature elected New York Supreme Court Justice John Sloss Hobart (Fed.) to fill the vacancy. Hobart vacated his seat on April 16, 1798, when he was appointed to the United States District Court for the District of New York, and on May 5 Gov. John Jay appointed William North (Fed.) to the U.S. Senate to fill the vacancy temporarily.

== State Senate ==
=== Districts ===
- The Southern District (9 seats) consisted of Kings, New York, Queens, Richmond, Suffolk and Westchester counties.
- The Middle District (12 seats) consisted of Dutchess, Orange, Ulster, Columbia and Delaware counties.
- The Eastern District (11 seats) consisted of Washington, Clinton, Rensselaer, Albany and Saratoga counties.
- The Western District (11 seats) consisted of Montgomery, Herkimer, Ontario, Otsego, Tioga, Onondaga, Schoharie and Steuben counties.
Note: There are now 62 counties in the State of New York. The counties which are not mentioned in this list had not yet been established, or sufficiently organized, the area being included in one or more of the abovementioned counties.

=== Members ===
The asterisk (*) denotes members of the previous Legislature who continued in office as members of this Legislature.

District	Senators	Term left	Party	Notes
Southern	Richard Hatfield*	1 year	Federalist	
Southern	Philip Livingston*	1 year	Federalist	
Southern	James Watson*	1 year	Federalist	
Southern	Samuel Jones*	2 years	Federalist	also New York State Comptroller
Southern	vacant	2 years		Joshua Sands vacated his seat on April 26, 1797, upon appointment as Collector of the Port of New York
Southern	Samuel Haight*	3 years	Federalist	
Southern	(Andrew Onderdonk*)	3 years	Federalist	died September 24, 1797, before this Legislature met
Southern	Selah Strong*	3 years	Federalist	
Southern	Ezra L'Hommedieu*	4 years	Dem.-Rep.	elected to the Council of Appointment
Middle	John D. Coe*	1 year	Dem.-Rep.	
Middle	Ambrose Spencer*	1 year	Federalist	also Assistant Attorney General (3rd D.)
Middle	Abraham Schenck*	2 years	Dem.-Rep.	
Middle	Christopher Tappen*	2 years	Dem.-Rep.	
Middle	Thomas Tillotson*	2 years	Dem.-Rep.	
Middle	Robert Sands*	3 years	Federalist	
Middle	James Savage*	3 years	Federalist	
Middle	Peter Silvester*	3 years	Federalist	
Middle	William Thompson*	3 years	Federalist	elected to the Council of Appointment
Middle	John Addison	4 years	Dem.-Rep.	
Middle	Peter Cantine Jr.	4 years	Federalist	
Middle	James G. Graham	4 years	Dem.-Rep.	
Eastern	Leonard Gansevoort*	1 year	Federalist	
Eastern	Francis Nicoll*	1 year	Federalist	
Eastern	Zina Hitchcock*	2 years	Federalist	elected to fill vacancy, in place of Philip Schuyler
Eastern	Ebenezer Russell*	2 years	Federalist	
Eastern	Moses Vail*	2 years	Federalist	elected to the Council of Appointment
Eastern	Leonard Bronck*	3 years	Federalist	
Eastern	James Gordon*	3 years	Federalist	
Eastern	Ebenezer Clark*	4 years	Federalist	
Eastern	Anthony Ten Eyck*	4 years	Federalist	
Eastern	Jacobus Van Schoonhoven*	4 years	Federalist	
Eastern	Abraham Van Vechten	4 years	Federalist	also Recorder of the City of Albany
Western	Abraham Arndt	1 year	Federalist	
Western	Johannes Dietz*	1 year	Federalist	
Western	John Frey*	1 year	Federalist	
Western	Thomas R. Gold*	1 year	Federalist	also Assistant Attorney General (7th D.)
Western	Vincent Mathews*	2 years	Federalist	
Western	Joseph White*	2 years	Federalist	elected to the Council of Appointment
Western	Jacob Morris*	3 years	Federalist	
Western	Jedediah Sanger*	3 years	Federalist	from March 22, 1798, also First Judge of the Oneida County Court
Western	Thomas Morris*	4 years	Federalist	
Western	Michael Myers*	4 years	Federalist	
Western	Seth Phelps	4 years	Federalist	

=== Employees ===
- Clerk: Abraham B. Bancker

== State Assembly ==
=== Districts ===
- Albany County (10 seats)
- Clinton County (1 seat)
- Columbia County (6 seats)
- Delaware County (2 seats)
- Dutchess County (10 seats)
- Herkimer County (7 seats)
- Kings County (1 seat)
- Montgomery County (6 seats)
- The City and County of New York (13 seats)
- Onondaga County (2 seats)
- Ontario and Steuben counties (2 seats)
- Orange County (3 seats)
- Otsego County (4 seats)
- Queens County (4 seats)
- Rensselaer County (6 seats)
- Richmond County (1 seat)
- Saratoga County (5 seats)
- Schoharie County (1 seat)
- Suffolk County (4 seats)
- Tioga County (2 seats)
- Ulster County (7 seats)
- Washington County (6 seats)
- Westchester County (5 seats)
Note: There are now 62 counties in the State of New York. The counties which are not mentioned in this list had not yet been established, or sufficiently organized, the area being included in one or more of the abovementioned counties.

=== Assemblymen ===
The asterisk (*) denotes members of the previous Legislature who continued as members of this Legislature.

District	Assemblymen	Party	Notes
Albany	Thomas E. Barker	Federalist	
Albany	Johann Jost Dietz	Federalist	
Albany	Andrew N. Heermance		
Albany	Nathaniel Ogden*		
Albany	John Prince*		
Albany	Philip P. Schuyler*		
Albany	Dirck Ten Broeck*	Federalist	elected Speaker
Albany	Joel Thompson	Federalist	
Albany	John H. Wendell*		
Albany	Peter West	Federalist	
Clinton	Daniel Ross		
Columbia	Caleb Benton*		
Columbia	John C. Hogeboom*	Dem.-Rep.	
Columbia	Killian Hogeboom	Dem.-Rep.	
Columbia	Elisha Jenkins	Federalist	
Columbia	Samuel Ten Broeck	Dem.-Rep.	
Columbia	Peter I. Vosburgh*		
Delaware	William Horton		
Delaware	Nathaniel Wattles		died on January 2, 1798, in Albany
Dutchess	William Barker	Dem.-Rep.	
Dutchess	Lemuel Clift	Federalist	
Dutchess	Luther Holley		
Dutchess	Joseph Potter	Federalist	
Dutchess	Philip J. Schuyler	Federalist	
Dutchess	Jacob Smith*		
Dutchess	John Thomas		
Dutchess	Jesse Thompson*	Federalist	
Dutchess	Samuel Towner	Dem.-Rep.	
Dutchess	William B. Verplanck*	Federalist	
Herkimer	Benjamin Bowen		
Herkimer	Matthew Brown Jr.*		
Herkimer	Ludwick Campbell*		
Herkimer	Isaac Foote	Federalist	
Herkimer	Gaylord Griswold*	Federalist	
Herkimer	Henry McNeil*	Federalist	
Herkimer	Nathan Smith		
Kings	Peter Vandervoort*	Federalist	
Montgomery	Frederick Gettman*	Federalist	
Montgomery	James Hildreth		
Montgomery	Robert McFarland		
Montgomery	George Metcalfe		also Assistant Attorney General (5th D.)
Montgomery	Jacob Snell	Dem.-Rep.	
Montgomery	Philip Van Alstyne	Dem.-Rep.	
New York	Philip I. Arcularius	Dem.-Rep.	
New York	William Boyd	Dem.-Rep.	
New York	Ebenezer S. Burling	Dem.-Rep.	
New York	Aaron Burr	Dem.-Rep.	
New York	DeWitt Clinton	Dem.-Rep.	
New York	Jacob De La Montagnie	Dem.-Rep.	
New York	William Denning	Dem.-Rep.	
New York	James Fairlie	Dem.-Rep.	
New York	James Hunt	Dem.-Rep.	
New York	Samuel L. Mitchill	Dem.-Rep.	
New York	Ezekiel Robins	Dem.-Rep.	
New York	Thomas Storm	Dem.-Rep.	previously a member from Dutchess Co.
New York	George Warner	Dem.-Rep.	
Onondaga	Silas Halsey*		
Onondaga	Comfort Tyler*		
Ontario and Steuben	Amos Hall	Federalist	
Ontario and Steuben	Charles Williamson*		
Orange	James Burt	Dem.-Rep.	
Orange	Benjamin Coe		
Orange	Moses Hatfield		
Otsego	Joshua Dewey		
Otsego	Francis Henry*	Federalist	
Otsego	Elijah Holt		
Otsego	Timothy Morse*		
Queens	Stephen Carman	Federalist	
Queens	Whitehead Cornwell		
Queens	William Pearsall*	Federalist	
Queens	John I. Skidmore	Dem.-Rep.	
Rensselaer	John Bird*	Federalist	in April 1798, elected to the 6th United States Congress
Rensselaer	Jacob A. Fort*	Federalist	
Rensselaer	Daniel Gray*	Federalist	
Rensselaer	Jonathan Hoag		
Rensselaer	Hosea Moffitt*	Federalist	
Rensselaer	Israel Thompson		
Richmond	Paul I. Micheau	Federalist	
Saratoga	Seth C. Baldwin*		
Saratoga	Samuel Clark*		
Saratoga	Adam Comstock*	Dem.-Rep.	
Saratoga	Douw I. Fonda		
Saratoga	Aaron Gregory		
Schoharie	John Rice*	Federalist	
Suffolk	John Howard		
Suffolk	Abraham Miller*	Dem.-Rep.	
Suffolk	Josiah Reeve		
Suffolk	Silas Wood*	Federalist	
Tioga	Emanuel Coryell*	Federalist	
Tioga	Benjamin Hovey		
Ulster	John Barber		
Ulster	Philip D. Bevier	Dem.-Rep.	
Ulster	Phineas Bowman		
Ulster	Jacobus S. Bruyn	Dem.-Rep.	
Ulster	John A. DeWitt		
Ulster	John C. DeWitt*	Dem.-Rep.	
Ulster	Andrew McCord	Dem.-Rep.	
Washington	Charles Kane		
Washington	Daniel Mason*		
Washington	Reuben Pride		
Washington	Edward Savage*	Dem.-Rep.	
Washington	Thomas Smith		
Washington	Melancton Wheeler		
Westchester	William Adams		
Westchester	John Barker*	Federalist	
Westchester	Elijah Lee		
Westchester	Abel Smith	Dem.-Rep.	
Westchester	Charles Teed*	Federalist	

=== Employees ===
- Clerk: James Van Ingen
- Sergeant-at-Arms: Robert Hunter
- Doorkeeper: Peter Hansen

== Sources ==
- The New York Civil List compiled by Franklin Benjamin Hough (Weed, Parsons and Co., 1858) [see pg. 108f for Senate districts; pg. 116 for senators; pg. 148f for Assembly districts; pg. 171 for assemblymen]
- Election result Assembly, Dutchess Co. at project "A New Nation Votes", compiled by Phil Lampi, hosted by Tufts University Digital Library
- Election result Assembly, Montgomery Co. at project "A New Nation Votes"
- Election result Assembly, Rensselaer Co. at project "A New Nation Votes"
- Election result Assembly, Saratoga Co. at project "A New Nation Votes"
- Election result Assembly, Washington Co. at project "A New Nation Votes"
- Election result Assembly Speaker at project "A New Nation Votes"
