= 16th New York State Legislature =

New York state legislative session

←	15th	17th	→
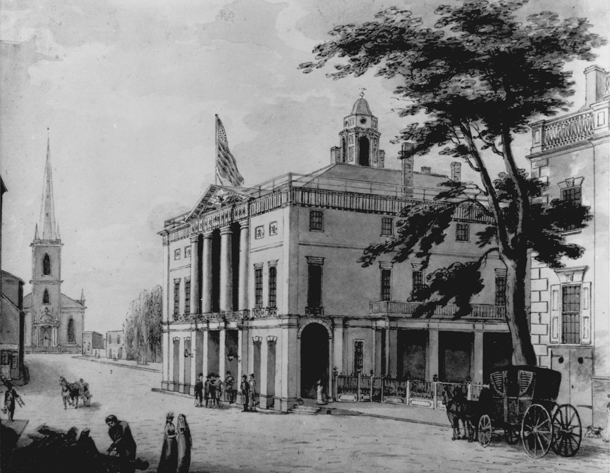
- The Old New York City Hall, where the Legislature met in 1784. From January 1785 to August 1790, the Congress of the Confederation and the 1st United States Congress met here, and the building was renamed Federal Hall. From 1791 to 1793, the State Legislature met again here, and the building was demolished in 1812. (1798)

Overview
- Legislative body: New York State Legislature
- Jurisdiction: New York, United States
- Term: July 1, 1792 – June 30, 1793

Senate
- Members: 24
- President: Lt. Gov. Pierre Van Cortlandt
- Party control: Democratic-Republican (13-11)

Assembly
- Members: 70
- Speaker: John Watts (Fed.)
- Party control: Democratic-Republican

Sessions
- 1st: November 6, 1792 – March 12, 1793

The 16th New York State Legislature, consisting of the New York State Senate and the New York State Assembly, met from November 6, 1792, to March 12, 1793, during the sixteenth year of George Clinton's governorship, in New York City.

== Background ==
Under the provisions of the New York Constitution of 1777, the state senators were elected on general tickets in the senatorial districts, and were then divided into four classes. Six senators each drew lots for a term of 1, 2, 3 or 4 years and, beginning at the election in April 1778, every year six Senate seats came up for election to a four-year term. Assemblymen were elected countywide on general tickets to a one-year term, the whole assembly being renewed annually.

In March 1786, the legislature enacted that future legislatures meet on the first Tuesday of January of each year unless called earlier by the governor. No general meeting place was determined, leaving it to each Legislature to name the place where to reconvene, and if no place could be agreed upon, the legislature should meet again where it adjourned.

On February 7, 1791, the Legislature re-apportioned the Senate and Assembly districts, according to the figures of the 1790 United States census.

State Senator Peter Schuyler died on January 4, 1792, leaving a vacancy in the Western District.

At this time the politicians were divided into two opposing political parties: the Federalists and the Democratic-Republicans. Since the first appearance of the political parties, many politicians changed sides for a variety of reasons, but the highly controversial gubernatorial election of 1792 re-aligned the politicians more clearly.

== Elections ==
The State election was held from April 24 to 26, 1792. Gov. George Clinton and Lt. Gov. Pierre Van Cortlandt were re-elected to a sixth term after the Canvass Committee rejected the votes of Otsego, Clinton and Tioga counties on technicalities.

Henry Cruger, John Schenck, Selah Strong (all three Southern D.), John Livingston, Robert Woodworth (both Eastern D.) and Assemblyman Joseph Hasbrouck (Middle D.) were elected to full terms in the Senate. Assemblyman John Frey was elected to fill the vacancy in the Western District.

== Sessions ==
This time, the legislature was called to meet early to elect presidential electors. Both Houses met at Federal Hall in New York City; assembled a quorum on November 6, 1792; and adjourned on March 12, 1793.

On November 20, 1792, the legislature chose 12 presidential electors: William Floyd, Samuel Osgood, Edward Savage, Stephen Ward, John Bay, Jesse Woodhull, David Van Ness, Johannes Bruyn, Volkert Veeder, Abraham Yates Jr., Samuel Clark and Abraham Ten Eyck. All were Democratic-Republicans, elected on the first ballot in both Houses, and all cast their votes for George Washington and Gov. George Clinton.

After the 1790 United States census, Congress re-apportioned the seats, increasing New York's representation from 6 to 10 seats. This required the legislature to re-apportion the congressional districts in the State what was belatedly done on December 18, 1792. Subsequently, the congressional elections were held in January 1793.

== State Senate ==
=== Districts ===
- The Southern District (8 seats) consisted of Kings, New York, Queens, Richmond, Suffolk and Westchester counties.
- The Middle District (6 seats) consisted of Dutchess, Orange and Ulster counties.
- The Eastern District (5 seats) consisted of Washington, Clinton, Columbia and Rensselaer counties.
- The Western District (5 seats) consisted of Albany, Montgomery, Herkimer, Ontario, Otsego, Saratoga and Tioga counties.

Note: There are now 62 counties in the State of New York. The counties which are not mentioned in this list had not yet been established, or sufficiently organized, the area being included in one or more of the abovementioned counties.

=== Members ===
The asterisk (*) denotes members of the previous Legislature who continued in office as members of this Legislature. Joseph Hasbrouck and John Frey changed from the Assembly to the Senate.

The party affiliations follow the vote on the contested election of John Livingston. The Democratic-Republicans voted to seat Livingston, affirming that the decision of the Canvass Committee was final for both the governor's and the senators' vote. The Federalists voted against this, supporting the claim of Thomas Jenkins, the Federalist candidate who had lost the election after the rejection of the ballots from Clinton County, affirming that under the Constitution it was the right and duty of the Senate to revise the decision of the Canvass Committee concerning the election of senators.

District	Senators	Term left	Party	Notes
Southern	Philip Livingston*	1 year	Federalist	
Southern	David Gelston*	2 years	Dem.-Rep.	also Surrogate of New York County; elected to the Council of Appointment
Southern	Philip Van Cortlandt*	2 years	Dem.-Rep.	elected in January 1793 to the 3rd United States Congress
Southern	Samuel Jones*	3 years	Federalist	also Recorder of New York City
Southern	Joshua Sands*	3 years	Federalist	
Southern	Henry Cruger	4 years	Federalist	
Southern	John Schenck	4 years	Dem.-Rep.	
Southern	Selah Strong	4 years	Federalist	
Middle	John Cantine*	1 year	Dem.-Rep.	
Middle	James Carpenter*	1 year	Dem.-Rep.	
Middle	David Pye*	2 years	Dem.-Rep.	
Middle	Thomas Tillotson*	3 years	Dem.-Rep.	
Middle	Jacobus Swartwout*	3 years	Dem.-Rep.	
Middle	Joseph Hasbrouck*	4 years	Dem.-Rep.	elected to the Council of Appointment
Eastern	Alexander Webster*	1 year	Dem.-Rep.	
Eastern	John Williams*	2 years	Dem.-Rep.	
Eastern	William Powers*	3 years	Federalist	
Eastern	John Livingston	4 years	Dem.-Rep.	
Eastern	Robert Woodworth	4 years	Dem.-Rep.	elected to the Council of Appointment
Western	Volkert P. Douw*	1 year	Federalist	
Western	Leonard Gansevoort	1 year	Federalist	
Western	John Frey*	2 years	Federalist	elected to fill vacancy, in place of Peter Schuyler; elected to the Council of Appointment
Western	Stephen Van Rensselaer*	2 years	Federalist	
Western	Philip Schuyler*	3 years	Federalist	

=== Employees ===
- Clerk: Abraham B. Bancker

== State Assembly ==
=== Districts ===
- The City and County of Albany (7 seats)
- Columbia County (6 seats)
- Dutchess County (7 seats)
- Herkimer County (1 seat)
- Kings County (1 seat)
- Montgomery County) (4 seats)
- The City and County of New York (7 seats)
- Ontario County (1 seat)
- Orange County (3 seats)
- Otsego County (1 seat)
- Queens County (3 seats)
- Rensselaer County (5 seats)
- Richmond County (1 seat)
- Saratoga County (4 seats)
- Suffolk County (4 seats)
- Tioga County (1 seat)
- Ulster County (5 seats)
- Washington and Clinton counties (4 seats)
- Westchester County (5 seats)

Note: There are now 62 counties in the State of New York. The counties which are not mentioned in this list had not yet been established, or sufficiently organized, the area being included in one or more of the abovementioned counties.

=== Assemblymen ===
The asterisk (*) denotes members of the previous Legislature who continued as members of this Legislature.

County	Assemblymen	Party	Notes
Albany	Leonard Bronck	Federalist	
Albany	Johannes Dietz	Federalist	
Albany	Jellis A. Fonda*	Federalist	
Albany	Stephen Lush*		
Albany	Francis Nicoll*	Federalist	
Albany	John Ten Broeck*		
Albany	Cornelius A. Van Slyck		
Columbia	Matthew Adgate	Dem.-Rep.	
Columbia	Benjamin Birdsall*		
Columbia	Jared Coffin*		
Columbia	Philip Frisbee		
Columbia	Stephen Hogeboom		
Columbia	Samuel Ten Broeck		
Dutchess	Jonathan Akins*	Dem.-Rep.	
Dutchess	Josiah Holly		
Dutchess	James Kent	Federalist	
Dutchess	Ebenezer Mott		
Dutchess	Matthew Patterson*		
Dutchess	Barnabas Payen		
Dutchess	William Radclift		
Herkimer	Michael Myers*	Federalist	
Kings	Aquila Giles		
Montgomery	Jacob Eaker		
Montgomery	David McMasters*		
Montgomery	Silas Talbot*	Federalist	elected in January 1793 to the 3rd United States Congress
Montgomery	Simon Veeder		
New York	William Cock		
New York	John DeLancey		
New York	William W. Gilbert		
New York	Josiah Ogden Hoffman*	Federalist	
New York	William S. Livingston*		
New York	John Watts*	Federalist	re-elected Speaker; elected in January 1793 to the 3rd United States Congress
New York	John Wylly*		
Ontario	Isaac Chapin		or Israel Chapin
Orange	Reuben Hopkins	Dem.-Rep.	
Orange	John Smith*		
Orange	Daniel Thew		
Otsego	Jacob Morris	Federalist	
Queens	Samuel Clowes*		
Queens	Whitehead Cornwell*	Dem.-Rep.	
Queens	Jacob Hicks		
Rensselaer	Benjamin Hicks	Federalist	
Rensselaer	Christopher Hutton		
Rensselaer	Josiah Masters	Dem.-Rep.	
Rensselaer	Jonathan Niles		
Rensselaer	Nicholas Staats		
Richmond	Gozen Ryerss*	Federalist	
Saratoga	Adam Comstock		
Saratoga	Beriah Palmer	Dem.-Rep.	
Saratoga	vacant		
Saratoga	vacant		
Suffolk	John Gelston*		
Suffolk	Jonathan N. Havens*	Dem.-Rep.	
Suffolk	Ebenezer Platt		
Suffolk	John Smith*	Dem.-Rep.	
Tioga	John Paterson	Dem.-Rep.	
Ulster	John Addison	Dem.-Rep.	
Ulster	Philip D. Bevier	Dem.-Rep.	
Ulster	Severyn T. Bruyn	Dem.-Rep.	
Ulster	John C. DeWitt	Dem.-Rep.	
Ulster	Nathan Smith	Dem.-Rep.	
Washington and Clinton	Daniel Curtis		
Washington and Clinton	Zina Hitchcock*	Federalist	
Washington and Clinton	David Hopkins*	Dem.-Rep.	
Washington and Clinton	Stanton Tifft		
Westchester	Hezekiah Brown		
Westchester	Richard Hatfield	Federalist	
Westchester	Elias Newman*		
Westchester	Thomas Thomas		
Westchester	vacant		

=== Employees ===
- Clerk: John McKesson
- Sergeant-at-Arms: Robert Hunter
- Doorkeeper:Richard Ten Eyck

== Sources ==
- The New York Civil List compiled by Franklin Benjamin Hough (Weed, Parsons and Co., 1858) [see pg. 108 for Senate districts; pg. 114 for senators; pg. 148f for Assembly districts; pg. 167 for assemblymen; pg. 320 and 323 for presidential election]
- Election result Assembly, Dutchess Co. at project "A New Nation Votes", compiled by Phil Lampi, hosted by Tufts University Digital Library
- Election result Assembly, Herkimer Co. at project "A New Nation Votes"
- Election result Assembly, Kings Co. at project "A New Nation Votes"
- Election result Assembly, Montgomery Co. at project "A New Nation Votes"
- Election result Assembly, Orange Co. at project "A New Nation Votes"
- Election result Assembly, Otsego Co. at project "A New Nation Votes"
- Election result Assembly, Rensselaer Co. at project "A New Nation Votes"
- Election result Assembly, Ulster Co. at project "A New Nation Votes"
