= 20th New York State Legislature =

New York state legislative session

←	19th	21st	→
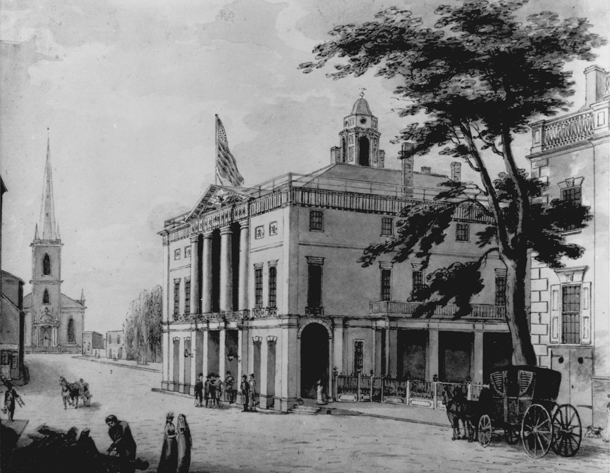
- The Old New York City Hall, where the Legislature first met in 1784. From January 1785 to August 1790, the Congress of the Confederation and the 1st United States Congress met here, and the building was renamed Federal Hall. From 1791 to 1793, and from 1795 to 1796, the State Legislature met again here. The building was demolished in 1812. (1798)

Overview
- Legislative body: New York State Legislature
- Jurisdiction: New York, United States
- Term: July 1, 1796 – June 30, 1797

Senate
- Members: 43
- President: Lt. Gov. Stephen Van Rensselaer (Fed.)
- Party control: Federalist (36-6)

Assembly
- Members: 108
- Speaker: Gulian Verplanck (Fed.)
- Party control: Federalist

Sessions
- 1st: November 1 – 11, 1796
- 2nd: January 3 – April 3, 1797

The 20th New York State Legislature, consisting of the New York State Senate and the New York State Assembly, met from November 1, 1796, to April 3, 1797, during the second year of John Jay's governorship, first in New York City, then in Albany.

== Background ==
Under the provisions of the New York Constitution of 1777, the State Senators were elected on general tickets in the senatorial districts, and were then divided into four classes. Six senators each drew lots for a term of 1, 2, 3 or 4 years and, beginning at the election in April 1778, every year six Senate seats came up for election to a four-year term. Assemblymen were elected countywide on general tickets to a one-year term, the whole assembly being renewed annually.

In March 1786, the Legislature enacted that future Legislatures meet on the first Tuesday of January of each year unless called earlier by the governor. No general meeting place was determined, leaving it to each Legislature to name the place where to reconvene, and if no place could be agreed upon, the Legislature should meet again where it adjourned.

On July 1, 1795, Stephen Van Rensselaer took office as Lieutenant Governor of New York, leaving a vacancy in the Western District.

On March 4, 1796, the Legislature re-apportioned the Senate and Assembly districts, based on the figures of the New York State Census of 1795. The number of State Senators was increased from 24 to 43, adding 1 to the Southern D.; and 6 each to the other three districts. The number of assemblymen was increased from 70 to 108, double-county districts were separated, and several new counties were created.

At this time the politicians were divided into two opposing political parties: the Federalists and the Democratic-Republicans.

== Elections ==
The State election was held from April 26 to 28, 1796. Senator Selah Strong (Southern D.) was re-elected. Assemblymen James Watson (Southern D.), Thomas Morris, Johannes Dietz, Jacob Morris, Leonard Bronck and Francis Nicoll (all five Western D.) were elected to the Senate. Samuel Haight, Andrew Onderdonk (both Southern D.), Robert Sands, Christopher Tappen, William Thompson (all three Middle D.), Ebenezer Clark, Moses Vail, James Savage, Peter Silvester, Anthony Ten Eyck (all five Eastern D.), Jedediah Sanger, James Gordon, Leonard Gansevoort, Thomas R. Gold, John Richardson, Vincent Mathews, Joseph White and Abraham Arndt (all eight Western D.) were also elected to the Senate. All, except Christopher Tappen, were Federalists.

Upon taking their seats, the new senators were classified: Ebenezer Clark, Anthony Ten Eyck, Thomas Morris and John Richardson drew 1-year terms; James Watson, Leonard Gansevoort, Francis Nicoll, Abraham Arndt, Johannes Dietz and Thomas R. Gold drew 2-year terms; Christopher Tappen, Moses Vail, Vincent Mathews and Joseph White drew 3-year terms; and Samuel Haight, Andrew Onderdonk, Selah Strong, Robert Sands, James Savage, Peter Silvester, William Thompson, Leonard Bronck, Jacob Morris, James Gordon and Jedediah Sanger drew 4-year terms.

== Sessions ==
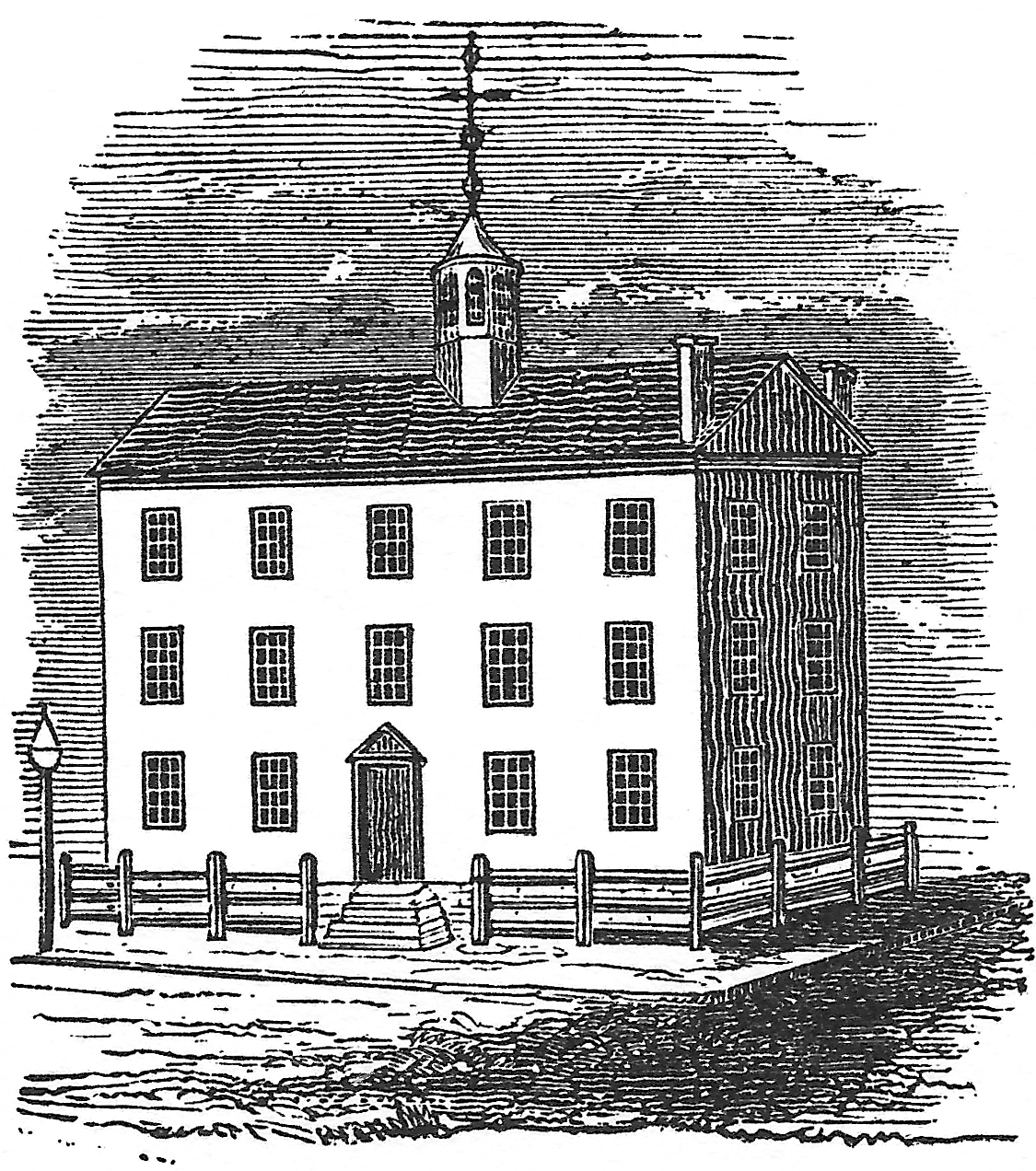
The Old Albany City Hall

The Legislature met at Federal Hall in New York City on November 1, 1796, to elect presidential electors, and both Houses adjourned on November 11. This was the last session not held in Albany.

Federalist Gulian Verplanck was elected Speaker.

To balance the representation of the senatorial districts, the re-apportionment was amended, transferring Columbia Co. from the Eastern to the Middle District; and Albany and Saratoga counties from the Western to the Eastern D. Thus senators Spencer, Savage and Silvester moved from the Eastern to the Middle; and Bronck, Gansevoort, Gordon, Nicoll, Schuyler and Van Schoonhoven from the Western to the Eastern District.

On November 7, 1796, the Legislature elected 12 presidential electors, all Federalists: Lewis Morris, Abijah Hammond, Richard Thorne, Peter Cantine Jr., Robert Van Rensselaer, Johannes Miller, Abraham Ten Broeck, Abraham Van Vechten, St. John Honeywood, William Root, Peter Smith and Charles Newkirk. They cast their votes for John Adams and Thomas Pinckney.

On November 9, 1796, the Legislature elected U.S. District Judge John Laurance to the U.S. Senate, to fill the vacancy caused by the resignation of Rufus King.

The Legislature met for the regular session on January 3, 1797, at the Old City Hall in Albany, New York; and both Houses adjourned on April 3.

On January 24, 1797, the Legislature elected Senator Philip Schuyler to the U.S. Senate, to succeed Aaron Burr, for a 6-year term beginning on March 4, 1797.

Among the legislative acts of this session were: the declaration of Albany as the State capital, and plans to build a State capitol; the creation of the office of New York State Comptroller; and the creation of Delaware County, with 2 seats in the Assembly.

== State Senate ==
=== Districts ===
- The Southern District (9 seats) consisted of Kings, New York, Queens, Richmond, Suffolk and Westchester counties.
- The Middle District (12 seats) consisted of Dutchess, Orange, Ulster and Columbia counties.
- The Eastern District (11 seats) consisted of Washington, Clinton, Rensselaer, Albany and Saratoga counties.
- The Western District (11 seats) consisted of Montgomery, Herkimer, Ontario, Otsego, Tioga, Onondaga and Schoharie counties.
Note: There are now 62 counties in the State of New York. The counties which are not mentioned in this list had not yet been established, or sufficiently organized, the area being included in one or more of the abovementioned counties.

=== Members ===
The asterisk (*) denotes members of the previous Legislature who continued in office as members of this Legislature. James Watson, Leonard Bronck, Francis Nicoll, Johannes Dietz, Jacob Morris and Thomas Morris changed from the Assembly to the Senate.

Note: The table shows the Districts as re-apportioned after the election.

District	Senators	Term left	Party	Notes
Southern	Ezra L'Hommedieu*	1 year	Federalist	
Southern	Richard Hatfield*	2 years	Federalist	
Southern	Philip Livingston*	2 years	Federalist	
Southern	James Watson*	2 years	Federalist	
Southern	Samuel Jones*	3 years	Federalist	until March 15, 1797, also Recorder of New York City, from March 15, 1797, also New York State Comptroller
Southern	Joshua Sands*	3 years	Federalist	vacated his seat on April 26, 1797, upon appointment as Collector of the Port of New York
Southern	Samuel Haight	4 years	Federalist	
Southern	Andrew Onderdonk	4 years	Federalist	elected to the Council of Appointment
Southern	Selah Strong*	4 years	Federalist	
Middle	John Cantine*	1 year	Dem.-Rep.	
Middle	Reuben Hopkins*	1 year	Dem.-Rep.	
Middle	vacant	1 year		
Middle	John D. Coe*	2 years	Dem.-Rep.	
Middle	Ambrose Spencer*	2 years	Federalist	also Assistant Attorney General (3rd D.); Spencer lived in Columbia Co., and had been elected in the old Eastern D. in 1795; elected to the Council of Appointment
Middle	Abraham Schenck*	3 years	Dem.-Rep.	
Middle	Christopher Tappen	3 years	Dem.-Rep.	
Middle	Thomas Tillotson*	3 years	Dem.-Rep.	
Middle	Robert Sands	4 years	Federalist	
Middle	James Savage	4 years	Federalist	
Middle	Peter Silvester	4 years	Federalist	
Middle	William Thompson	4 years	Federalist	
Eastern	Ebenezer Clark	1 year	Federalist	
Eastern	Zina Hitchcock*	1 year	Federalist	
Eastern	Anthony Ten Eyck	1 year	Federalist	
Eastern	Jacobus Van Schoonhoven*	1 year	Federalist	Van Schoonhoven lived in Saratoga Co., and had been elected in the old Western D. in 1793
Eastern	Leonard Gansevoort	2 years	Federalist	elected to the Council of Appointment
Eastern	Francis Nicoll*	2 years	Federalist	
Eastern	Ebenezer Russell*	3 years	Federalist	
Eastern	Philip Schuyler*	3 years	Federalist	Schuyler lived in Albany Co., and had been elected in the old Western D. in 1795; elected on January 24, 1797, to the U.S. Senate
Eastern	Moses Vail	3 years	Federalist	
Eastern	Leonard Bronck*	4 years	Federalist	
Eastern	James Gordon	4 years	Federalist	
Western	Thomas Morris*	1 year	Federalist	elected to the Council of Appointment
Western	Michael Myers*	1 year	Federalist	
Western	John Richardson	1 year	Federalist	
Western	Abraham Arndt	2 years	Federalist	
Western	Johannes Dietz*	2 years	Federalist	
Western	John Frey*	2 years	Federalist	
Western	Thomas R. Gold	2 years	Federalist	also Assistant Attorney General (7th D.)
Western	Vincent Mathews	3 years	Federalist	
Western	Joseph White	3 years	Federalist	
Western	Jacob Morris*	4 years	Federalist	
Western	Jedediah Sanger	4 years	Federalist	

=== Employees ===
- Clerk: Abraham B. Bancker

== State Assembly ==
=== Districts ===
- Albany County (10 seats)
- Clinton County (1 seat)
- Columbia County (6 seats)
- Dutchess County (10 seats)
- Herkimer County (7 seats)
- Kings County (1 seat)
- Montgomery County (6 seats)
- The City and County of New York (13 seats)
- Onondaga County (2 seats)
- Ontario County (2 seats)
- Orange County (3 seats)
- Otsego County (5 seats)
- Queens County (4 seats)
- Rensselaer County (6 seats)
- Richmond County (1 seat)
- Saratoga County (5 seats)
- Schoharie County (1 seat)
- Suffolk County (4 seats)
- Tioga County (2 seats)
- Ulster County (8 seats)
- Washington County (6 seats)
- Westchester County (5 seats)
Note: There are now 62 counties in the State of New York. The counties which are not mentioned in this list had not yet been established, or sufficiently organized, the area being included in one or more of the abovementioned counties.

=== Assemblymen ===
The asterisk (*) denotes members of the previous Legislature who continued as members of this Legislature.

County	Assemblymen	Party	Notes
Albany	James Bill		
Albany	Philip Conine Jr.		
Albany	James C. Duane		
Albany	Jacob Hochstrasser*		
Albany	James Holcomb		
Albany	Nathaniel Ogden		
Albany	John Prince		
Albany	Philip P. Schuyler		
Albany	Dirck Ten Broeck*	Federalist	
Albany	John H. Wendell		
Clinton	Charles Platt		
Columbia	Caleb Benton		
Columbia	Palmer Cady		
Columbia	John C. Hogeboom	Dem.-Rep.	
Columbia	John McKinstry		
Columbia	Peter I. Vosburgh		
Columbia	Jonathan Warner		
Dutchess	Samuel A. Barker	Federalist	
Dutchess	Jacob Bockée	Federalist	
Dutchess	Joseph Crane Jr.		
Dutchess	Richard Davis*		
Dutchess	Jesse Oakley*	Federalist	
Dutchess	William Pearce		
Dutchess	Jacob Smith*		
Dutchess	Jesse Thompson*	Federalist	
Dutchess	William B. Verplanck	Federalist	
Dutchess	William Wheeler		
Herkimer	Isaac Brayton		
Herkimer	Arthur Breese		
Herkimer	Matthew Brown Jr.		
Herkimer	Ludwick Campbell		
Herkimer	Gaylord Griswold	Federalist	
Herkimer	Joshua Leland		
Herkimer	Henry McNeil	Federalist	
Kings	Peter Vandervoort*	Federalist	
Montgomery	Jacob Eaker		
Montgomery	Frederick Gettman*	Federalist	
Montgomery	George Metcalfe		from February 16, 1797, also Assistant Attorney General (5th D.)
Montgomery	John C. Van Eps		
Montgomery	Peter V. Veeder		
Montgomery	Simon Veeder		
New York	Leonard Bleecker		
New York	Richard Furman*	Federalist	
New York	Josiah Ogden Hoffman	Federalist	also New York State Attorney General
New York	James Kent	Federalist	previously a member from Dutchess Co.; from March 28, 1797, also Recorder of New York City
New York	Alexander Lamb*	Dem.-Rep.	
New York	Herman LeRoy		
New York	Jonathan Little		
New York	Jacob Morton*	Federalist	
New York	Jotham Post Jr.*	Federalist	
New York	James Roosevelt	Federalist	
New York	James Tylee		
New York	Gulian Verplanck	Federalist	elected Speaker
New York	Henry Will		
Onondaga	Silas Halsey		
Onondaga	Comfort Tyler		
Ontario	Lemuel Chipman		
Ontario	Charles Williamson		
Orange	Isaac Blanch		
Orange	Jonathan Cooley		
Orange	Seth Marvin*		
Otsego	Joshua H. Brett		
Otsego	Francis Henry	Federalist	
Otsego	Timothy Morse		
Otsego	Isaac Nash		
Otsego	Abraham C. Ten Broeck		
Queens	Lewis Cornwall		
Queens	David Kissam	Federalist	
Queens	William Pearsall	Federalist	
Queens	John M. Smith	Federalist	
Rensselaer	John Bird*	Federalist	
Rensselaer	John Carpenter	Federalist	
Rensselaer	Jacob A. Fort	Federalist	
Rensselaer	Daniel Gray*	Federalist	
Rensselaer	James McKown	Federalist	
Rensselaer	Hosea Moffitt	Federalist	
Richmond	Lewis Ryerss*		
Saratoga	Seth C. Baldwin		
Saratoga	Samuel Clark		
Saratoga	Adam Comstock*	Dem.-Rep.	
Saratoga	John McClelland*		
Saratoga	John Taylor		
Schoharie	John Rice	Federalist	
Suffolk	Jared Landon*		
Suffolk	Abraham Miller*		
Suffolk	Joshua Smith Jr.*		
Suffolk	Silas Wood*	Federalist	
Tioga	Emanuel Coryell*	Federalist	
Tioga	vacant		
Ulster	Johannes Bruyn	Dem.-Rep.	
Ulster	John Burr		
Ulster	Francis Crawford		
Ulster	John C. DeWitt	Dem.-Rep.	
Ulster	Ebenezer Foote*	Federalist	from March 20, 1797, also Delaware County Clerk
Ulster	Josiah Hasbrouck	Dem.-Rep.	
Ulster	James Oliver*	Federalist	
Ulster	Benjamin Sears		
Washington	Anthony I. Blanchard*		also Assistant Attorney General (4th D.)
Washington	Gerrit G. Lansing		
Washington	Timothy Leonard*		
Washington	Daniel Mason		
Washington	Edward Savage*	Dem.-Rep.	
Washington	Andrew White		
Westchester	John Barker	Federalist	
Westchester	Joseph Carpenter*	Federalist	
Westchester	Mordecai Hale*	Federalist	
Westchester	Charles Teed*	Federalist	
Westchester	Samuel Youngs	Federalist	

=== Employees ===
- Clerk: James Van Ingen
- Sergeant-at-Arms: Robert Hunter
- Doorkeeper: Richard Ten Eyck

== Sources ==
- The New York Civil List compiled by Franklin Benjamin Hough (Weed, Parsons and Co., 1858) [see pg. 108f for Senate districts; pg. 116 for senators; pg. 148f for Assembly districts; pg. 170f for assemblymen; pg. 323 for presidential electors]
- Election result Assembly, Dutchess Co. at project "A New Nation Votes", compiled by Phil Lampi, hosted by Tufts University Digital Library
- Election result Assembly, Herkimer Co. at project "A New Nation Votes"
- Election result Assembly, Onondaga Co. at project "A New Nation Votes"
- Election result Assembly, Ontario Co. at project "A New Nation Votes"
- Election result Assembly, Rensselaer Co. at project "A New Nation Votes"
- Election result Assembly, Schoharie Co. at project "A New Nation Votes"
- Election result Assembly, Westchester Co. at project "A New Nation Votes"
- Election result Senate, Southern D. at project "A New Nation Votes" [gives votes only from Queens Co.]
