= 14th New York State Legislature =

New York state legislative session

←	13th	15th	→
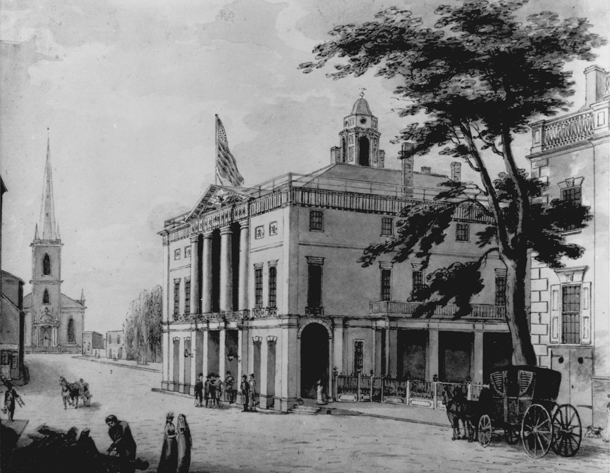
- The Old New York City Hall, where the Legislature met in 1784. From January 1785 to August 1790, the Congress of the Confederation and the 1st United States Congress met here, and the building was renamed Federal Hall. From 1791 to 1793, the State Legislature met again here, and the building was demolished in 1812. (1798)

Overview
- Legislative body: New York State Legislature
- Jurisdiction: New York, United States
- Term: July 1, 1790 – June 30, 1791

Senate
- Members: 24
- President: Lt. Gov. Pierre Van Cortlandt
- Party control: Federalist

Assembly
- Members: 65
- Speaker: John Watts (Fed.)
- Party control: Federalist

Sessions
- 1st: January 5, 1791 – March 24, 1791

The 14th New York State Legislature, consisting of the New York State Senate and the New York State Assembly, met from January 5 to March 24, 1791, during the fourteenth year of George Clinton's governorship, in New York City.

== Background ==
Under the provisions of the New York Constitution of 1777, the state senators were elected on general tickets in the senatorial districts, and were then divided into four classes. Six senators each drew lots for a term of 1, 2, 3 or 4 years and, beginning at the election in April 1778, every year six Senate seats came up for election to a four-year term. Assemblymen were elected countywide on general tickets to a one-year term, the whole assembly being renewed annually.

In March 1786, the legislature enacted that future legislatures meet on the first Tuesday of January of each year unless called earlier by the governor. No general meeting place was determined, leaving it to each Legislature to name the place where to reconvene, and if no place could be agreed upon, the legislature should meet again where it adjourned.

On January 27, 1790, the 13th New York State Legislature resolved that it was incompatible to hold a federal office at the same time as a seat in the legislature, and declared the seats of James Duane, John Laurance, John Hathorn, Philip Schuyler and Rufus King vacant. Besides, Anthony Hoffman died early in 1790, leaving a total of four vacancies (Hathorn's term was expiring anyway) in the state Senate, to be filled by special elections.

In August 1790, the 1st United States Congress adjourned at Federal Hall and reconvened in December at Congress Hall in Philadelphia. In January 1791, the state legislature returned to the vacated Federal Hall for the next three sessions before the State capital was permanently established at Albany in 1794.

On October 7, 1790, the "New Hampshire Grants Controversy" was settled when the State of New York recognized the status quo, and ceded formally the Counties of Cumberland and Gloucester to the Vermont Republic of which both counties de facto had been part since 1777.

At this time the politicians were divided into two opposing political parties: the Federalists and the Democratic-Republicans. However, at this early time party lines were not yet as distinctly drawn as they became in the 19th century. Many politicians changed sides, and voted according to their personal opinions on issues and people, what can be seen especially at the U.S. Senate election, in which Philip Schuyler, one of the leading Federalists, was voted down by a nominal Federalist majority of the legislature.

Philip Schuyler had been elected to the U.S. Senate in 1789, and drew the Class 1 lot, so his seat came up for election by the legislature.

== Elections ==
The State election was held from April 27 to 29, 1790. Senators John Williams (Eastern D.) and Peter Schuyler (Western D.) were re-elected; and David Gelston (Southern D.), David Pye (Middle D.), and Assemblymen Philip Van Cortlandt (Southern D.) and Stephen Van Rensselaer (Western D.) were also elected to full terms in the Senate. Peter Lefferts (Southern D.), Leonard Gansevoort (Western D.) and Assemblymen Samuel Jones (Southern D.) and Thomas Tillotson (Middle D.) were elected to fill vacancies in the Senate.

== Sessions ==
The legislature was to meet for the regular session on January 4, 1791, at Federal Hall in New York City; both Houses assembled a quorum on the next day; and adjourned on March 24.

The Legislature elected NY Attorney General Aaron Burr a U.S. Senator from New York, to succeed Philip Schuyler. Schuyler was the Federalist candidate to succeed himself, Burr was the Democratic-Republican challenger. Although both Houses had a nominal Federalist majority, Burr won in the Senate by a vote of 12 to 4, and in the Assembly with a majority of 5 votes. Many of the Federalists took the opportunity to show their disapproval of both Schuyler's haughtiness and the financial policies of Schuyler's son-in-law Alexander Hamilton, the U.S. Secretary of the Treasury. Besides, the Livingston faction of the Federalist Party felt betrayed after the election of Rufus King over their candidate James Duane in 1789, and now allied themselves with Clinton and later became Democratic-Republicans.

On February 7, 1791, the Legislature re-apportioned the Senate and Assembly districts. The area of Columbia and Rensselaer counties were transferred from the Western to the Eastern District; and the Southern and the Western districts lost one senator each, which were added to the Eastern District. The total number of assemblymen was again set at 70; but several new counties were established: Herkimer (1), Ontario (1), Otsego (1), Rensselaer (5), Saratoga (4) and Tioga (1); Kings, Orange, Queens, Richmond, Suffolk, Ulster and Westchester lost 1 seat, and Montgomery and New York lost 2; and Columbia won 3 seats.

== State Senate ==
=== Districts ===
- The Southern District (9 seats) consisted of Kings, New York, Queens, Richmond, Suffolk and Westchester counties.
- The Middle District (6 seats) consisted of Dutchess, Orange and Ulster counties.
- The Eastern District (3 seats) consisted of Washington and Clinton counties.
- The Western District (6 seats) consisted of Albany, Columbia and Montgomery counties.

Note: There are now 62 counties in the State of New York. The counties which are not mentioned in this list had not yet been established, or sufficiently organized, the area being included in one or more of the abovementioned counties.

=== Members ===
The asterisk (*) denotes members of the previous Legislature who continued in office as members of this Legislature. Samuel Jones, Philip Van Cortlandt and Thomas Tillotson changed from the Assembly to the Senate.

District	Senators	Term left	Party	Notes
Southern	Samuel Jones*	1 year	Dem.-Rep.	elected to fill vacancy, in place of John Laurance; also Recorder of New York City
Southern	Peter Lefferts	1 year		elected to fill vacancy, in place of James Duane
Southern	(Samuel Townsend)*	1 year	Dem.-Rep.	died on November 24, 1790, before the Legislature met
Southern	Ezra L'Hommedieu*	2 years	Fed./Dem.-Rep.	
Southern	Paul Micheau*	2 years	Federalist	
Southern	Isaac Roosevelt*	2 years	Federalist	elected to the Council of Appointment
Southern	Philip Livingston*	3 years	Federalist	
Southern	David Gelston	4 years		also Surrogate of New York County
Southern	Philip Van Cortlandt*	4 years	Federalist	
Middle	Thomas Tillotson*	1 year	Federalist	elected to fill vacancy; in place of Anthony Hoffman; elected to the Council of Appointment
Middle	Jacobus Swartwout*	1 year	Dem.-Rep.	
Middle	James Clinton*	2 years	Dem.-Rep.	
Middle	John Cantine*	3 years	Dem.-Rep.	
Middle	James Carpenter	3 years		
Middle	David Pye	4 years	Federalist	
Eastern	Edward Savage*	2 years	Dem.-Rep.	
Eastern	Alexander Webster*	3 years	Dem.-Rep.	elected to the Council of Appointment
Eastern	John Williams*	4 years	Dem.-Rep.	
Western	Jellis Fonda*	1 year		
Western	Peter Van Ness*	2 years	Dem.-Rep.	
Western	Volkert P. Douw*	3 years		
Western	Leonard Gansevoort	3 years	Federalist	elected to fill vacancy, in place of Philip Schuyler
Western	Peter Schuyler*	4 years	Federalist	elected to the Council of Appointment
Western	Stephen Van Rensselaer*	4 years	Federalist	

=== Employees ===
- Clerk: Abraham B. Bancker

== State Assembly ==
=== Districts ===
- The City and County of Albany (7 seats)
- Columbia County (3 seats)
- Dutchess County (7 seats)
- Kings County (2 seats)
- Montgomery County) (6 seats)
- The City and County of New York (9 seats)
- Orange County (4 seats)
- Queens County (4 seats)
- Richmond County (2 seats)
- Suffolk County (5 seats)
- Ulster County (6 seats)
- Washington and Clinton counties (4 seats)
- Westchester County (6 seats)

Note: There are now 62 counties in the State of New York. The counties which are not mentioned in this list had not yet been established, or sufficiently organized, the area being included in one or more of the abovementioned counties.

=== Assemblymen ===
The asterisk (*) denotes members of the previous Legislature who continued as members of this Legislature.

County	Assemblymen	Party	Notes
Albany	Sidney Berry		
Albany	Leonard Bronck*		
Albany	Jonathan Brown		
Albany	John W. Schermerhorn	Federalist	
Albany	Richard Sill*	Federalist	
Albany	Jacobus Van Schoonhoven		
Albany	Cornelius A. Van Slyck		
Columbia	Matthew Adgate	Dem.-Rep.	
Columbia	Stephen Hogeboom		
Columbia	James Savage*	Federalist	
Dutchess	Jonathan Akins	Dem.-Rep.	
Dutchess	Samuel A. Barker*		
Dutchess	Isaac Bloom*		
Dutchess	James Kent		
Dutchess	Henry Schenck		
Dutchess	James Tallmadge		
Dutchess	David Van Ness		
Kings	Aquila Giles*		
Kings	Peter Vandervoort*	Federalist	
Montgomery	Abraham Arndt*		
Montgomery	Josiah Crane*	Federalist	
Montgomery	John Frey	Dem.-Rep.	
Montgomery	James Livingston*	Federalist	
Montgomery	Michael Myers*		
Montgomery	John T. Visscher		
New York	Cornelius J. Bogert		
New York	Nicholas Cruger		
New York	William W. Gilbert		
New York	Josiah Ogden Hoffman	Federalist	
New York	Alexander Macomb		
New York	John Pintard		
New York	James Watson	Federalist	
New York	John Watts*	Federalist	elected Speaker
New York	Henry Will*		
Orange	John Carpenter*	Dem.-Rep.	
Orange	John D. Coe*	Federalist	
Orange	Seth Marvin*	Federalist	
Orange	John Smith		
Queens	Samuel Clowes		
Queens	Nathaniel Lawrence	Dem.-Rep.	
Queens	Samuel L. Mitchill	Dem.-Rep.	
Queens	John Schenck	Dem.-Rep.	
Richmond	Gozen Ryerss	Federalist	
Richmond	Peter Winant*	Federalist	
Suffolk	John Gelston		
Suffolk	Jonathan N. Havens*	Dem.-Rep.	
Suffolk	John Smith*	Dem.-Rep.	
Suffolk	Philetus Smith		
Suffolk	Thomas Wickham		
Ulster	John De Lametter		
Ulster	Matthew Dubois		
Ulster	John G. Graham		
Ulster	Joseph Hasbrouck		
Ulster	James Hunter		
Ulster	Johannis Snyder	Dem.-Rep.	
Washington and Clinton	Thomas Converse*		
Washington and Clinton	Daniel Curtis		
Washington and Clinton	Zina Hitchcock*		
Washington and Clinton	John Rowan*		
Westchester	Peter Fleming		
Westchester	Abijah Gilbert	Dem.-Rep.	
Westchester	Samuel Haight*		
Westchester	Jonathan Horton*	Federalist	
Westchester	Ebenezer Purdy		
Westchester	Jonathan G. Tompkins	Dem.-Rep.	

=== Employees ===
- Clerk: John McKesson

== Sources ==
- The New York Civil List compiled by Franklin Benjamin Hough (Weed, Parsons and Co., 1858) [see pg. 108 for Senate districts; pg. 114 for senators; pg. 148f for Assembly districts; pg. 165f for assemblymen]
- Election result Assembly, Kings Co. at project "A New Nation Votes", compiled by Phil Lampi, hosted by Tufts University Digital Library
- Election result Assembly, Queens Co. at project "A New Nation Votes"
- Election result Assembly, Westchester Co. at project "A New Nation Votes"
