= Daniel Curtis =

Daniel Curtis may refer to:

- Daniel Curtis (politician), American politician from New York
- Daniel Curtis (composer), Welsh composer and producer
- Daniel Sargent Curtis (1825–1908), American lawyer and banker
- Dan Curtis (1927–2006), American director and producer
- Dan Curtis (politician), mayor of Whitehorse, Yukon
- Danny Beard, British drag queen
