= 15th New York State Legislature =

New York state legislative session

←	14th	16th	→
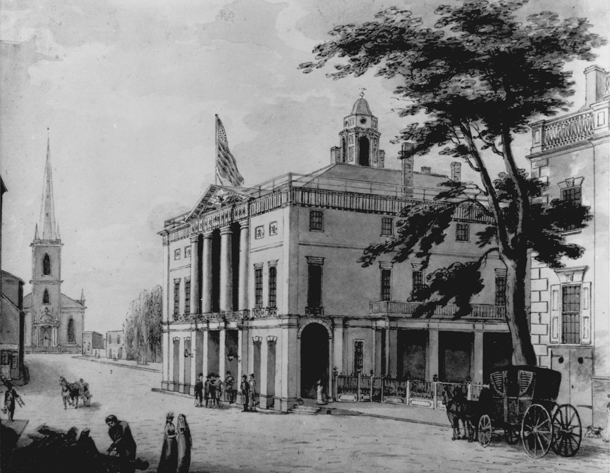
- The Old New York City Hall, where the Legislature met in 1784. From January 1785 to August 1790, the Congress of the Confederation and the 1st United States Congress met here, and the building was renamed Federal Hall. From 1791 to 1793, the State Legislature met again here, and the building was demolished in 1812. (1798)

Overview
- Legislative body: New York State Legislature
- Jurisdiction: New York, United States
- Term: July 1, 1791 – June 30, 1792

Senate
- Members: 24
- President: Lt. Gov. Pierre Van Cortlandt

Assembly
- Members: 70
- Speaker: John Watts (Fed.)

Sessions
- 1st: January 5, 1792 – April 12, 1792

The 15th New York State Legislature, consisting of the New York State Senate and the New York State Assembly, met from January 5 to April 12, 1792, during the fifteenth year of George Clinton's governorship, in New York City.

== Background ==
Under the provisions of the New York Constitution of 1777, the state senators were elected on general tickets in the senatorial districts, and were then divided into four classes. Six senators each drew lots for a term of 1, 2, 3 or 4 years and, beginning at the election in April 1778, every year six Senate seats came up for election to a four-year term. Assemblymen were elected countywide on general tickets to a one-year term, the whole assembly being renewed annually.

In March 1786, the legislature enacted that future legislatures meet on the first Tuesday of January of each year unless called earlier by the governor. No general meeting place was determined, leaving it to each Legislature to name the place where to reconvene, and if no place could be agreed upon, the legislature should meet again where it adjourned.

On February 7, 1791, the Legislature re-apportioned the Senate and Assembly districts, according to the figures of the United States census of 1790. The area of Columbia and Rensselaer counties were transferred from the Western to the Eastern District; and the Southern and the Western districts lost one senator each, which were added to the Eastern District. The total number of assemblymen was again set at 70; but several new counties were established: Herkimer (1 seat), Ontario (1), Otsego (1), Rensselaer (5), Saratoga (4) and Tioga (1); Kings, Orange, Queens, Richmond, Suffolk, Ulster and Westchester lost 1 seat, and Montgomery and New York lost 2; and Columbia won 3 seats.

At this time the politicians were divided into two opposing political parties: the Federalists and the Democratic-Republicans. Party lines were not as distinctly drawn then as they became during the 19th century. Some politicians changed sides, for example the Livingston faction of the Federalist Party who felt betrayed after the election of Rufus King over their candidate James Duane in the 1789 United States Senate elections in New York and later voted down Schuyler for re-election in 1791.

== Elections ==
The State election was held from April 26 to 28, 1791. Senators Samuel Jones (Southern D.), Thomas Tillotson and Jacobus Swartwout (both Middle D.) were re-elected; and Joshua Sands (Southern D.), William Powers (Eastern D.) and Ex-U.S. Senator Philip Schuyler (Western D.) were also elected to the Senate.

== Sessions ==
The legislature was to meet for the regular session on January 3, 1792, at Federal Hall in New York City; both Houses assembled a quorum two days later; and adjourned on April 12.

On April 12, 1792, they enacted that the legislature should meet on the first Tuesday of November every four years, beginning in 1792, to choose presidential electors. The electors should then meet as electoral college at Poughkeepsie.

== State Senate ==
=== Districts ===
- The Southern District (8 seats) consisted of Kings, New York, Queens, Richmond, Suffolk and Westchester counties.
- The Middle District (6 seats) consisted of Dutchess, Orange and Ulster counties.
- The Eastern District (5 seats) consisted of Washington, Clinton, Columbia and Rensselaer counties.
- The Western District (5 seats) consisted of Albany, Montgomery, Herkimer, Ontario, Otsego, Saratoga and Tioga counties.

Note: There are now 62 counties in the State of New York. The counties which are not mentioned in this list had not yet been established, or sufficiently organized, the area being included in one or more of the abovementioned counties.

=== Members ===
The asterisk (*) denotes members of the previous Legislature who continued in office as members of this Legislature.

District	Senators	Term left	Party	Notes
Southern	Ezra L'Hommedieu*	1 year	Fed./Dem.-Rep.	
Southern	Paul Micheau*	1 year	Federalist	
Southern	Isaac Roosevelt*	1 year	Federalist	
Southern	Philip Livingston*	2 years	Federalist	
Southern	David Gelston*	3 years	Dem.-Rep.	also Surrogate of New York County
Southern	Philip Van Cortlandt*	3 years	Federalist	elected to the Council of Appointment
Southern	Samuel Jones*	4 years	Dem.-Rep.	also Recorder of New York City
Southern	Joshua Sands	4 years	Federalist	
Middle	James Clinton*	1 year	Dem.-Rep.	
Middle	John Cantine*	2 years	Dem.-Rep.	
Middle	James Carpenter*	2 years		
Middle	David Pye*	3 years	Federalist	elected to the Council of Appointment
Middle	Thomas Tillotson*	4 years	Dem.-Rep.	
Middle	Jacobus Swartwout*	4 years	Dem.-Rep.	
Eastern	Edward Savage*	1 year	Dem.-Rep.	
Eastern	Peter Van Ness*	1 year	Dem.-Rep.	Van Ness lived in Columbia Co., and was elected in the old Western D. in 1788
Eastern	Alexander Webster*	2 years	Dem.-Rep.	
Eastern	John Williams*	3 years	Dem.-Rep.	
Eastern	William Powers	4 years	Federalist	elected to the Council of Appointment
Western	Volkert P. Douw*	2 years		
Western	Leonard Gansevoort	2 years	Federalist	
Western	(Peter Schuyler)*	3 years	Federalist	died January 4, 1792, before the Legislature convened
Western	Stephen Van Rensselaer*	3 years	Federalist	elected to the Council of Appointment
Western	Philip Schuyler	4 years	Federalist	

=== Employees ===
- Clerk: Abraham B. Bancker

== State Assembly ==
=== Districts ===
- The City and County of Albany (7 seats)
- Columbia County (6 seats)
- Dutchess County (7 seats)
- Herkimer County (1 seat)
- Kings County (1 seat)
- Montgomery County (4 seats)
- The City and County of New York (7 seats)
- Ontario County (1 seat)
- Orange County (3 seats)
- Otsego County (1 seat)
- Queens County (3 seats)
- Rensselaer County (5 seats)
- Richmond County (1 seat)
- Saratoga County (4 seats)
- Suffolk County (4 seats)
- Tioga County (1 seat)
- Ulster County (5 seats)
- Washington and Clinton counties (4 seats)
- Westchester County (5 seats)

Note: There are now 62 counties in the State of New York. The counties which are not mentioned in this list had not yet been established, or sufficiently organized, the area being included in one or more of the abovementioned counties.

=== Assemblymen ===
The asterisk (*) denotes members of the previous Legislature who continued as members of this Legislature.

County	Assemblymen	Party	Notes
Albany	Jellis A. Fonda	Federalist	
Albany	Stephen Lush		
Albany	David McCarty	Dem.-Rep.	
Albany	Francis Nicoll	Federalist	
Albany	William North	Federalist	
Albany	John Ten Broeck		
Albany	Henry Ten Eyck		
Columbia	Benjamin Birdsall		
Columbia	Jared Coffin		
Columbia	Jacob Ford	Federalist	previously a member from Albany Co.
Columbia	Lawrence Hogeboom		
Columbia	Henry Livingston	Federalist	
Columbia	James Savage*	Federalist	
Dutchess	Jonathan Akins*	Dem.-Rep.	
Dutchess	Samuel A. Barker*		
Dutchess	Isaac Bloom*		
Dutchess	Daniel Graham	Dem.-Rep.	
Dutchess	Morgan Lewis		
Dutchess	Matthew Patterson		
Dutchess	James Tallmadge*		
Herkimer	Michael Myers*		previously a member from Montgomery Co.; unsuccessfully contested
Kings	Charles Doughty		
Montgomery	Douw Fonda		
Montgomery	John Frey*	Dem.-Rep.	
Montgomery	David McMasters		
Montgomery	Silas Talbot	Federalist	
New York	Josiah Ogden Hoffman*	Federalist	
New York	William S. Livingston		
New York	Melancton Smith	Dem.-Rep.	
New York	William Pitt Smith		
New York	John Watts*	Federalist	re-elected Speaker
New York	Henry Will*		
New York	John Wylly		
Ontario	Eleazer Lindsley		
Orange	John D. Coe*	Federalist	
Orange	Seth Marvin*	Federalist	
Orange	John Smith*		
Otsego	James Cannon		previously a member from Montgomery Co.
Queens	Samuel Clowes*		
Queens	Whitehead Cornwell	Dem.-Rep.	
Queens	Nathaniel Lawrence*	Dem.-Rep.	
Rensselaer	Jonathan Brown*		previously a member from Albany Co.
Rensselaer	John Knickerbacker Jr.	Federalist	
Rensselaer	John W. Schermerhorn*	Federalist	previously a member from Albany Co.
Rensselaer	Thomas Sickles	Federalist	previously a member from Albany Co.
Rensselaer	Moses Vail		
Richmond	Gozen Ryerss*	Federalist	
Saratoga	Sidney Berry*		previously a member from Albany Co.; seat vacated on January 20, 1792
Saratoga	Andrew Mitchell		seat vacated on January 20, 1792
Saratoga	Elias Palmer		
Saratoga	Benjamin Rosekrans		
Suffolk	John Gelston*		
Suffolk	Jonathan N. Havens*	Dem.-Rep.	
Suffolk	Henry Scudder	Dem.-Rep.	
Suffolk	John Smith*	Dem.-Rep.	
Tioga	Jonathan Fitch		seat in doubt, but retained
Ulster	Ebenezer Clark	Dem.-Rep.	
Ulster	Jacob De Lametter*		
Ulster	Ebenezer Foote	Federalist	
Ulster	Joseph Hasbrouck*		
Ulster	vacant		
Washington and Clinton	John Conger		
Washington and Clinton	Thomas Converse*		
Washington and Clinton	Zina Hitchcock*		
Washington and Clinton	David Hopkins	Dem.-Rep.	
Westchester	Samuel Haight*		
Westchester	Elias Newman		
Westchester	Ebenezer Purdy*		
Westchester	Jonathan G. Tompkins*	Dem.-Rep.	
Westchester	Pierre Van Cortlandt Jr.	Dem.-Rep.	

=== Employees ===
- Clerk: John McKesson

== Sources ==
- The New York Civil List compiled by Franklin Benjamin Hough (Weed, Parsons and Co., 1858) [see pg. 108 for Senate districts; pg. 114 for senators; pg. 148f for Assembly districts; pg. 166f for assemblymen]
- Election result Senate, Southern D. (only Queens Co.) at project "A New Nation Votes", compiled by Phil Lampi, hosted by Tufts University Digital Library
- Election result Assembly, Albany Co. at project "A New Nation Votes"
- Election result Assembly, Columbia Co. at project "A New Nation Votes"
- Election result Assembly, Kings Co. at project "A New Nation Votes"
- Election result Assembly, New York Co. at project "A New Nation Votes"
- Election result Assembly, Queens Co. at project "A New Nation Votes"
- Election result Assembly, Rensselaer Co. at project "A New Nation Votes"
- Election result Assembly, Westchester Co. at project "A New Nation Votes"
