= Adolphus F. Hitchcock =

New York farmer and politician (1803–1888)

Adolphus F. Hitchcock (April 25, 1803 – October 17, 1888) was an American farmer and politician from Kingsbury, New York.

== Life ==
Hitchcock was born on April 25, 1803, in Kingsbury, New York, the son of Collins Hitchcock and Eunice Porter. He was related to Attorney General John H. Martindale through his grandfather Ashel Hitchcock. His father and grandfather both served as justice of the peace, his great-uncle Zina Hitchcock served in the New York State Assembly and the New York State Senate, and two of his brothers served as Sheriff, with one of the brothers also serving as county clerk. He worked as a farmer.

In 1841, Hitchcock helped organize the Washington County Agricultural Society and was appointed to its executive committee. He was a vestryman of the St. James Episcopal Church in Fort Edward when it incorporated in 1844. He served as justice of the peace and Supervisor. He was a member of the New York State Assembly in 1847. Originally a Whig, he later became a Republican. In 1866, he was elected to the New York State Assembly as a Republican, representing the Washington County 2nd District. He served in the Assembly in 1867. He was a delegate to the 1867-1868 New York State Constitutional Convention.

In 1832, Hitchcock married Cynthia Ann Fitch, daughter of Daniel Fitch of Pawlet, Vermont. They had one child, Edward.

Hitchcock died at home on October 17, 1888. His funeral was held at his house two days later. He was buried in Kingsbury Cemetery.

New York State Assembly
Preceded by James C. Rogers	New York State Assembly; Washington County, 2nd District; 1867	Succeeded by Nathaniel Daily
