= John D. Coe =

American farmer and politician

John Daniel Coe (May 26, 1755 – May 3, 1824) was an American farmer and politician from New York.

== Life ==
He was the son of Daniel Coe (1731—1777) and Sarah (Palmer) Coe (c.1730—1764). He was born, and died, in that part of the Town of Haverstraw, then in Orange County, New York, which was separated in 1791 as the Town of New Hempstead, and renamed in 1829 as Ramapo, now in Rockland County, New York. On June 15, 1788, he married his cousin Sarah Coe (1761–1801), and they had eight children.

Coe was a Federalist member of the New York State Assembly (Orange Co.) in 1789-90, 1791, 1792 and 1794.

He was a member of the New York State Senate (Middle D.) from 1795 to 1798, sitting in the 18th, 19th, 20th and 21st New York State Legislatures.

He died on May 3, 1824, and was buried in the family farm's burial plot.
