= Samuel Youngs (1753–1797) =

American politician

Samuel Youngs (November 5, 1753 - November 2, 1797) was an American farmer and politician from New York

== Life ==
He was the son of Daniel Youngs (1718–1784) and Hannah (Underhill) Youngs. He married Rebecca Brush, and they had nine children.

He was a member of the New York State Assembly (Queens Co.) in 1794.

His grandson Samuel Youngs was a member of the State Assembly in 1843 and 1844.

== Sources ==
- The History of Long Island by Benjamin F. Thompson (New York, 1843; Vol. II, page 384)
