= Josiah Ogden Hoffman =

New York politician and judge

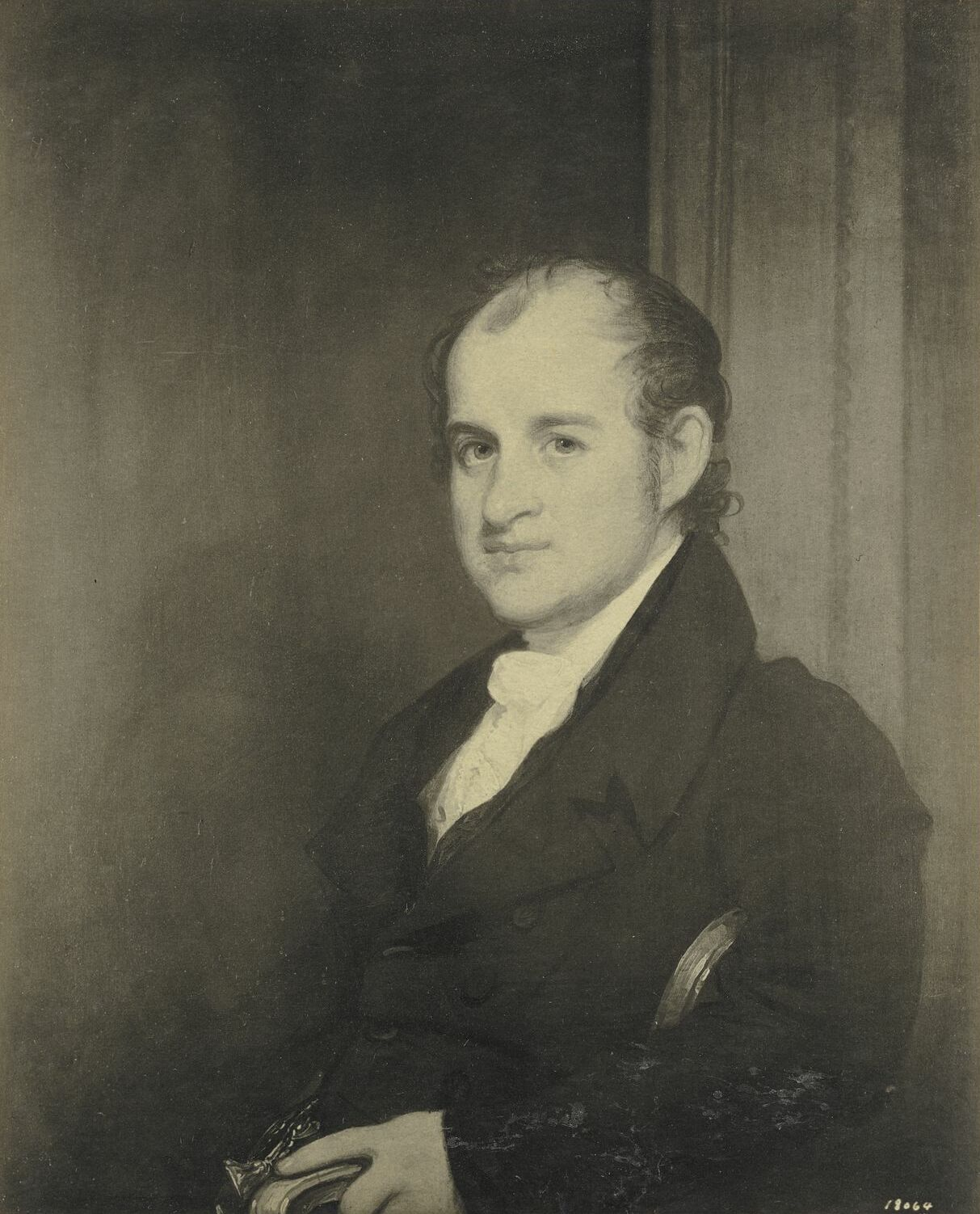
- portrait by Gilbert Stuart

Member of the New York Assembly from New York County
- In office July 1, 1796 – June 30, 1797

Attorney General of New York State
- In office November 13, 1795 – February 3, 1802
- Governor: George Clinton; John Jay; George Clinton
- Preceded by: Nathaniel Lawrence
- Succeeded by: Ambrose Spencer

Member of the New York Assembly from New York County
- In office July 1, 1790 – June 30, 1795

Personal details
- Born: April 14, 1766 Newark, Province of New Jersey
- Died: January 24, 1837 (aged 70) New York City, New York, U.S.
- Spouses: Mary Colden (m. 1789; died 1797) Maria Fenno (m. 1802; died 1823)
- Children: 7, including Ogden and Charles
- Parent(s): Nicholas Hoffman; Sarah Ogden
- Occupation: American politician

Josiah Ogden Hoffman (April 14, 1766 – January 24, 1837) was an American lawyer and politician. He was a friend of Alexander Hamilton and Washington Irving.

== Early life ==
Josiah Ogden Hoffman was born on April 14, 1766, in Newark, New Jersey, the son of Nicholas Hoffman (1736–1800) and Sarah Ogden Hoffman (1742–1821). He studied law, was admitted to the bar, and practiced in New York City, and entered politics as a Federalist.

== Career ==
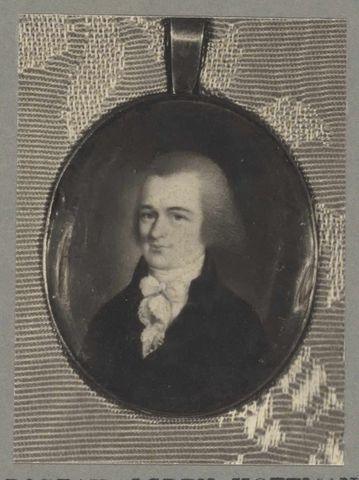
Josiah Ogden Hoffman, ca. 1790, portrait miniature by John Ramage (from Frick Photoarchive).

Hoffman was a member of the New York State Assembly (New York Co.) in 1791, 1792, 1792–93, 1794, 1795. He was New York Attorney General from 1795 to 1802, and was also a member of the State Assembly in 1796–97.

On July 14, 1804, he was a pallbearer at the funeral of Alexander Hamilton.

From 1810 to 1811, he was Recorder of New York City; again a member of the State Assembly in 1812–13; and again Recorder of New York City from 1813 to 1815.

In 1828, he was appointed as one of the first justices (with Samuel Jones and Thomas J. Oakley) of the then established New York City Superior Court, and remained on the bench until his death in 1837.

== Personal life ==
On February 16, 1789, he married Mary Colden (1770–1797), and they had four children, including:

- Alice Anna Hoffman (b. 1790)
- Sarah Matilda Hoffman (1791–1809), who was engaged to Washington Irving (1783–1859), who studied law at Hoffman's office, but did not wed because of her death before the marriage took place.
- Ogden Hoffman (1794–1856), a Congressman, who married Emily Burrall and later Virginia Southard.
- Mary Colden Hoffman (b. 1796)

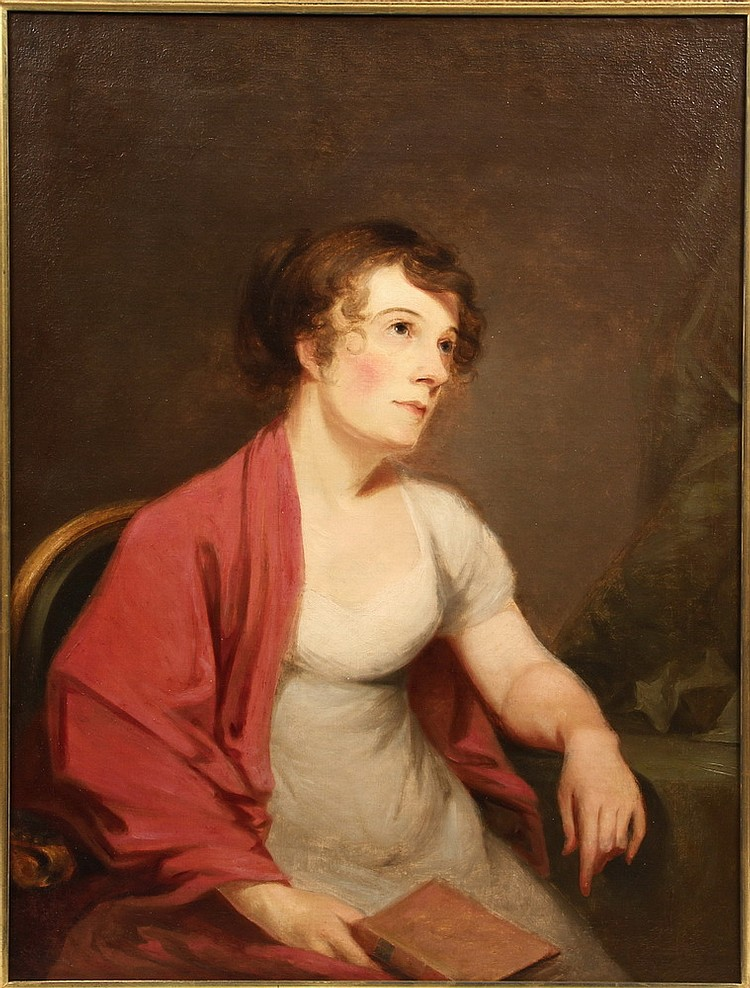
Maria Fenno Hoffman, portrait by Thomas Sully

He was a member of the New York Society Library, which has records of some of the books he borrowed between 1790 and 1805.

Following his first wife's death in 1797, on August 7, 1802, he married Maria Fenno (1781–1823), daughter of John Fenno (1751–1798), the Federalist editor of the Gazette of the United States. Maria's sister, Mary Eliza Fenno (d. 1817) married Gulian C. Verplanck. Together, Hoffman and Maria had three children, including:

- Charles Fenno Hoffman (1806–1884), the poet

Hoffman died on January 24, 1837, in New York City.

=== Descendants ===
His grandson was Ogden Hoffman, Jr. (1822–1891), a United States federal judge.

Legal offices
| Preceded by Nathaniel Lawrence | New York Attorney General; 1795–1802 | Succeeded by Ambrose Spencer |
| Preceded by Pierre C. Van Wyck | Recorder of New York City; 1810–1811 | Succeeded by Pierre C. Van Wyck |
| Preceded by Pierre C. Van Wyck | Recorder of New York City; 1813–1815 | Succeeded by Richard Riker |
