= Joshua Smith (New York politician) =

American politician

Joshua Smith (July 27, 1763 – April 12, 1845) was an American politician from New York.

== Life ==
He was the son of Joshua Smith (1732–1814), and Hannah (Smith) Smith (1742–1793), and was born and died at the family estate in the Smithtown section of Hauppauge.

On December 23, 1784, he married Alma Blydenburgh (died 1790). On October 19, 1793, he married Ruth Smith (1769–1797), and they had two children. On April 4, 1798, he married Deborah Smith (1771–1809), and they had three children, among them State Senator Joshua B. Smith (1801–1860).

Joshua Smith was a member of the New York State Assembly (Suffolk Co.) in 1794, 1795, 1796, 1796–97, 1798–99 and 1825.

He was a delegate to the New York State Constitutional Convention of 1821.

He was a member of the New York State Senate (1st D.) from 1826 to 1829, sitting in the 49th, 50th, 51st and 52nd New York State Legislatures.

== Sources ==
- The New York Civil List compiled by Franklin Benjamin Hough (pages 58, 126f, 145, 168ff, 172 and 203; Weed, Parsons and Co., 1858)
- Judge Joshua Smith at Long Island Surnames

New York State Senate
Preceded by John Lefferts	New York State Senate; First District (Class 3); 1826–1829	Succeeded by Alpheus Sherman
