= Daniel Curtis (politician) =

American politician

Daniel Curtis was an American politician from New York.

He lived in Granville, New York, and was a member from Washington and Clinton counties of the New York State Assembly in 1791 and 1792-93.
