= Benjamin Hicks (politician) =

American politician

Benjamin Hicks was an American politician from New York.

== Life ==
He was a Federalist member of the New York State Assembly, from Rensselaer Co. in 1792-93, 1794 and 1795; and from Otsego Co. in 1800-01.
