= Abraham Schenck (New York senator) =

American politician

Abraham Schenck was an American politician from New York.

== Life ==
He lived in Fishkill, New York.

He was a member of the New York State Senate from 1796 to 1799.

== Sources ==
- The New York Civil List compiled by Franklin Benjamin Hough (pages 116f and 145; Weed, Parsons and Co., 1858)
