= Robert Woodworth (politician) =

American politician and captain

State Senator for New York
- In office 1792–1796

Representative for Rensselaer County in New York State Assembly
- In office 1806–1807

Personal details
- Born: June 13, 1743 Norwich, Connecticut Colony
- Died: After 1806
- Profession: Farmer

Robert Woodworth (June 13, 1743 – after 1806) was a captain in the American Revolution and member of the Woodworth political family.

== Life ==
Woodworth was born in Norwich, Connecticut Colony on June 13, 1743, the son of Daniel Woodworth and Sarah Collins. He eventually moved to Rensselaer Manor, now Greenbush, New York, although maintaining ownership of land in Salisbury, Connecticut, and married Rachel Fitch, daughter of Abel Fitch.

In 1778, he served in the American Revolution as a captain of the Fourth Regiment, Second Rennslaerwyck Battalion. He was elected as a state senator in 1792, serving through 1796. Following that he served as a judge of the Court of Common Pleas, before returning to Albany as a representative of Rennselaer County in 1806, serving a term.

Robert and Rachel were the parents of future New York Attorney General, John Woodworth.
