= Joshua Sands (politician) =

American politician (1757–1835)

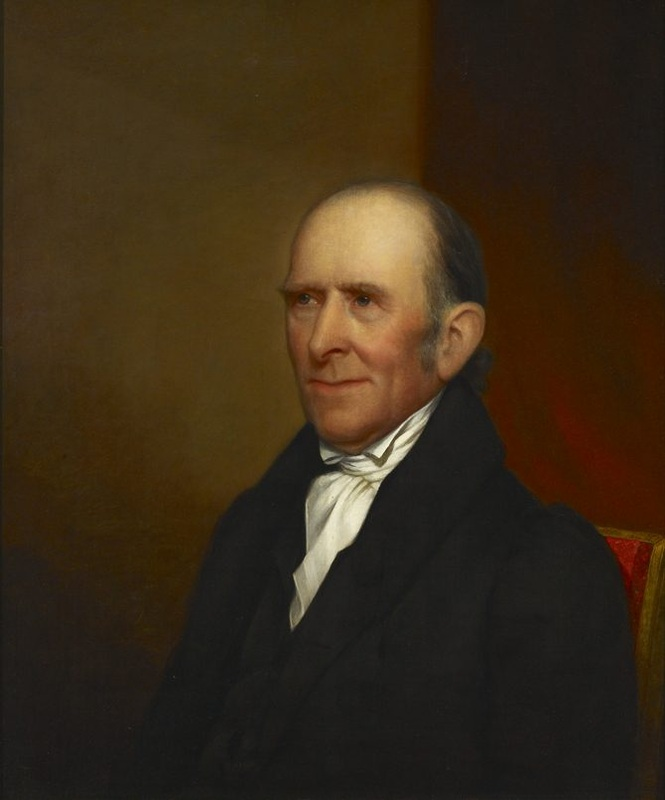

Member of the U.S. House of Representatives from New York's 2nd district
- In office March 4, 1825 – March 3, 1827
- Preceded by: Jacob Tyson
- Succeeded by: John J. Wood
- In office March 4, 1803 – March 3, 1805
- Preceded by: Samuel L. Mitchill
- Succeeded by: Gurdon S. Mumford

Collector of the Port of New York
- In office April 26, 1797 – July 9, 1801
- Preceded by: John Lamb
- Succeeded by: David Gelston

Member of the New York State Senate from the Southern District
- In office July 1, 1791 – April 26, 1797
- Preceded by: Peter Lefferts
- Succeeded by: Richard Hatfield

Personal details
- Born: October 12, 1757 Cow Neck, Province of New York, British America
- Died: September 13, 1835 (aged 77) Brooklyn, New York, U.S.
- Spouse: Ann Ayscough (m. 1780)
- Relations: Comfort Sands (brother)
- Children: 12, including Joshua
- Parent(s): John Sands; Elizabeth Cornwell

Joshua Sands (October 12, 1757 – September 13, 1835) was an American merchant and politician. He was a U.S. representative from New York.

== Early life ==
Sands was born on October 12, 1757, in Cow Neck which is now in the Village of Sands Point, located then in Queens County but since 1899 in Nassau County, New York. He was one of eight children born to John Sands (1708–1760) and Elizabeth Cornwell Sands (1711–1782), who also descended from one of the three original families who owned Cow Neck. Sands and his siblings received limited schooling. His eldest brother, John Sands (1737-1811), served as a colonel during the Revolutionary War and was also a member of the New York State Assembly for Queens County, 1784 to 1785. His younger brother, Comfort Sands (1748-1834), also served on the side of the colonists during the Revolutionary War.

=== Family ===
The Sands family was one of the original three families that settled in and owned what is now Sands Point, New York. Born in Reading, Berkshire, England, James Sands (d. 1695) immigrated to Plymouth, MA with his wife Sarah and their children, c. 1658. Along with several other men, James Sands obtained what is now Block Island, Rhode Island, from the original inhabitants of the island, the Narragansetts, in 1660. In 1661, Sands sailed from Taunton, MA and moved his family to Block Island and had six children.

== Career ==
Sands served as a captain in the 4th New York Regiment during the American Revolutionary War, and engaged in mercantile pursuits. He soon prospered in the West India trade. During the Revolutionary War, he served on several influential committees and led protests against the Crown.

In 1783, Sands and his brother Comfort Sands formed a business partnership dealing in foreign trade and land speculation. Their partnership included real estate ventures and a rope making manufacturing business in Brooklyn. In 1784, the Sands brothers purchased 160 acres of land along the Brooklyn waterfront for $12,000. They acquired the land, originally owned by the Rapelje family (also spelled Rapelye), early Dutch settlers of Brooklyn, under the 1779 New York State "Act for the Forfeiture and Sale of the Estates of Persons who Have Adhered to the Enemies of this State." The land acquired in the purchase included what is now the location of the Brooklyn Navy Yard (previously the New York Naval Shipyard), as well as the DUMBO and Vinegar Hill neighborhoods bordering the East River in Brooklyn. The waterfront area was to be the site of a new, planned community, called Olympia. It was to be divided into both commercial and residential properties and would be connected to Manhattan via the nearby ferry service. Though the land was surveyed, Olympia was never completed.

The Sands brothers were also co-founders and directors of the Bank of New York, along with Alexander Hamilton.

=== Political career ===
Beginning on July 1, 1791, he was a member of the New York State Senate during the 15th until the 20th New York State Legislature, and of the Council of Appointment in 1796. He vacated his seat in the Senate on April 26, 1797, when President John Adams appointed him Collector of the Port of New York. He held this office until July 9, 1801, when he was removed by President Thomas Jefferson.

He was elected as a Federalist to the Eighth Congress, and served from March 4, 1803, to March 3, 1805. He was President of the board of trustees of the Village of Brooklyn in 1824. He was again elected to the 19th United States Congress, and served from March 4, 1825, to March 3, 1827.

== Personal life ==
On March 9, 1780, Sand married Ann Ayscough (1761–1851), the daughter of Richard Ayscough, a surgeon in the British Army. St. Ann's Church, the first Episcopal church in Brooklyn incorporated in 1787, was named in her honor. In 1786, Joshua from Pearl Street in lower Manhattan to Brooklyn. He bought land along the Brooklyn waterfront in 1784, and built a three-story Federal style mansion at 31 Front Street in what is now the Sands Point neighborhood of Brooklyn. At its completion in 1787, it was the largest mansion in Brooklyn. Ann Sands hosted weekly church gatherings in the family home for many years. Together, Joshua and Ann were the parents of twelve children, including:

- Joshua Ratoon Sands (1795–1883), who served as a Rear Admiral in the United States Navy.

Ann Sands died in Brooklyn in 1851. Joshua Sands also died at Brooklyn, and was buried at St. Paul's Church Cemetery in Eastchester, New York. In 1852, he was re-interred in Green-Wood Cemetery in Brooklyn.

=== Legacy ===
There are several places that hold the Sands family name in New York; Sands Point, New York and Sands Street in Brooklyn. Further, St. Ann's Church, in the Brooklyn Heights neighborhood of Brooklyn, was reorganized, renamed, and reincorporated in 1795, honoring Ann Sands for her contribution to the founding of the church.

Political offices
Preceded by John Lamb	Collector of the Port of New York; 1797–1801	Succeeded by David Gelston
U.S. House of Representatives
Preceded by Samuel L. Mitchill	Member of the U.S. House of Representatives from New York's 2nd congressional district 1803–1805	Succeeded by Gurdon S. Mumford
Preceded by Jacob Tyson	Member of the U.S. House of Representatives from New York's 2nd congressional district 1825–1827	Succeeded by John J. Wood
