= Michael Myers (New York politician) =

American lawyer and politician (1753-1814)

Member of the New York State Senate
- In office 1793–1801

Member of the New York State Assembly from Montgomery County
- In office 1792 – 1793
- In office 1789–1790

Personal details
- Born: February 1, 1753 Elizabethtown, Province of New Jersey
- Died: February 17, 1814 (aged 61) Herkimer, New York, U.S.
- Children: 2

Military service
- Branch/service: U.S. Army
- Battles/wars: American Revolutionary War

Michael Myers (February 1, 1753 – February 17, 1814) was an American lawyer and politician from New York.

== Early life ==
Myers was born on February 1, 1753, in Elizabethtown, Province of New Jersey (now Elizabeth, New Jersey). A veteran of the American Revolutionary War, Myers fought in the Battle of Johnstown in 1781, and was severely wounded.

== Career ==
From 1791 to 1805, he was an associate judge of the Herkimer County Court.

He was a member of the New York State Assembly, from Montgomery County in 1789–90 and 1791; and from Herkimer County in 1792 and 1792–93. He was a member of the New York State Senate from 1793 to 1801.

== Personal life ==
Myers had two children. He died on February 17, 1814, in Herkimer, New York.
