= Phil Lampi =

American historian (born 1944)

Philip J. Lampi (born 1944 in Fitchburg, Worcester County, Massachusetts) is a scholar and historian currently employed as a researcher at the American Antiquarian Society (AAS) in Worcester, Massachusetts; he has spent much of his career reassembling records of early American election returns.

"That effort has now led to A New Nation Votes, a digital record of Lampi's work sponsored by the AAS, Tufts University, and the National Endowment for the Humanities. To the delight of graduate students, professional historians, and dabblers alike, the site makes public and searchable what, until now, could only be found in Lampi's loose-leaf notebooks: a comprehensive record of early American election returns from 1787 to 1825."

''Most of the early results in US elections were only published in local newspapers; there was no centralized US national record-keeping effort tallying the returns in US national elections. The only way to obtain the records was by physically travelling to the various state libraries and scouring their collections of locally-published early American newspapers; these papers were either archived originals or kept on microfilm; there was no way to make copies of the archives other than by photography (which required special permission) or by taking notes by hand. Making digital copies of the microfilm records was not possible at most US libraries until the late 1990s. So, "[f]or decades, at times supporting himself by working as a night watchman, Lampi made lists of election returns on notepads. He drove all over the country, scouring the archives by day, sleeping in his car by night. He eventually transcribed the returns of some sixty thousand elections."
