= Zina Hitchcock =

New York politician (1755–1832)

Hon. Zina Hitchcock

Justice of the Peace in Washington County, New York
- In office 1795 – c. 1810s

Member of the New York State Council of Appointment
- In office 1794–1795

Member of the New York State Senate from the Eastern District
- In office 1794–1803

Member of the New York State Assembly from Washington and Clinton Counties
- In office 1789–1793

Personal details
- Born: November 6, 1755 Warren or New Milford, Connecticut, U.S.
- Died: May 2, 1832 (aged 76) Franklin, Franklin County, New York, U.S.
- Party: Federalist
- Spouse: Mabel Lockwood (died 1817)
- Children: 8
- Relatives: Adolphus F. Hitchcock (grand-nephew)
- Occupation: Physician and surgeon

Zina Hitchcock (November 6, 1755 – May 2, 1832) was a New York politician. A descendant of the early American colonist Samuel Chapin, he was born on November 6, 1755, in Warren or New Milford, Connecticut. His father, John Hitchock, was a member of the Connecticut General Assembly. During the American Revolutionary War, Hitchcock served as an enlisted soldier in the Albany County militia. He moved to Sandy Hill, New York, c. 1783–1784, where he became a prominent landowner, a founding member of the local Masonic Lodge, and built the Zion church. In 1784, he became a founding member of the First Medical Society in Vermont, a predecessor to the Vermont Medical Society.

Hitchcock was a member of the Federalist Party. He served as a member of the New York State Assembly for Washington and Clinton Counties from 1789 to 1793, the New York State Senate representing the Eastern District from 1794 to 1803, and the Council of Appointment from 1794 to 1795. In 1795 Hitchcock was appointed a justice of the peace in Washington County, New York. He was re-appointed in 1798 and 1810. He was also a founding member of the Medical Society of Washington County and served as its second president from 1807 to 1810.

Hitchcock was married to Mabel Lockwood, with whom he had 8 children, until her death on August 28, 1817. He died on May 2, 1832, in Franklin, Franklin County, New York.

== Sources ==
- Bascom, Robert O. (1903). The Fort Edward Book. Fort Edward, N.Y.: James D. Keating – via Internet Archive.
- Caverly, Charles S. (May 1903). "Twentieth Century History of Vermont: Medicine and Surgery". The Vermonter. Vol. 8, no. 10. pp. 311–335 – via Google Books.
- Chapin, Gilbert Warren (1924). The Chapin Book of Genealogical Data. Vol. 1. Hartford, Conn.: Chapin Family Association – via Internet Archive.
- Hammond, Jabez D. (1846). The History of Political Parties in the State of New-York. Vol. 1 (4th ed.). Cooperstown, N.Y.: H. & E. Phinney – via Google Books.
- Hitchcock, Mary L. (1894). The Genealogy of the Hitchcock Family. Amherst, Mass.: Press of Carpenter & Morehouse – via Internet Archive.
- Hough, Franklin B. (1858). The New-York Civil List (PDF). Albany, N.Y.: Weed, Parsons & Co. – via Internet Archive.
- Johnson, Crisfield (1878). History of Washington Co., New York. Philadelphia: Everts & Ensign – via Internet Archive.
