= Bethea =

Bethea is a surname. Notable people with the surname include:

- Antoine Bethea (born 1984), professional American football safety
- Bill Bethea (born 1942), American college baseball coach
- Elvin Bethea (born 1946), former American football defensive end
- Erin Bethea (born 1982), American actress
- John M. Bethea (1919-2009), Florida State Forester, promoted Urban Forestry
- Jalil Bethea (born 2005), American basketball player
- James Bethea (born 1965), American producer and television performer
- Larry Bethea (1956–1987), American football defensive lineman
- Preston Lang Bethea (1870–1944), American politician
- Rainey Bethea (1909–1936), the last person to be publicly executed in the United States
- Ryan Bethea (born 1967), American football player
- Solomon H. Bethea (1852–1909), United States federal judge
- Andy C. Bethea (born 1964), American author

== See also ==
- Tristram Bethea House, also known as Pleasant Ridge, is a historic plantation house near Camden, Alabama
