= Windrow (surname) =

Windrow is a surname. Notable people with the surname include:

- George C. Windrow (1931–2019), American politician and soldier
- John Edwin Windrow (1899–1984), American educator
- Martin Windrow (1944–2025), British historian, editor, and author
