= Dudley Dudley =

Dudley Dudley may refer to:

- Dudley Dudley (politician) (born 1936), political activist in New Hampshire
- Dudley Dudley (wrestler) (born 1968), American professional wrestler
