= Robinson Female Seminary =

Coordinates: 42.9796°N 70.9564°W

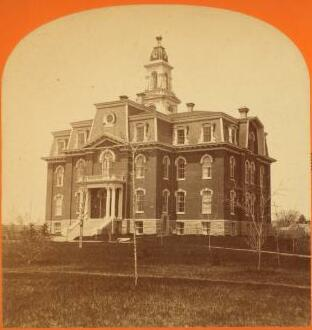
- (ca. 1870–80)
- Exeter, New Hampshire, U.S.

Information
- Type: day and boarding school
- Established: 1867
- Founder: William Robinson
- Closed: 1955
- School board: Board of trustees
- Principal: Eben S. Stearns; George N. Cross
- Gender: girls
- Age range: Nine and older
- Campus size: 16 acres (6.5 ha)

Robinson Female Seminary was an American girl's day and boarding school in Exeter, New Hampshire. William Robinson, a native and early resident of the town, gave $250,000 to it for the establishment of a female seminary. The adopted a code of regulations for the management of the institution which was sanctioned by a legislative enactment.

It opened in 1867 and was fully organized and established in its new building in 1869 It was the second school in the U.S. to introduce domestic science into its curriculum. The seminary closed in 1955.

== History ==
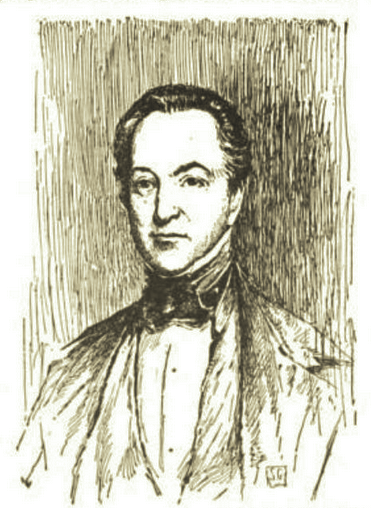
William Robinson

The Robinson Seminary was established through the liberal bequest of William Robinson, a native of Exeter, but for many years a resident of Augusta, Georgia, where he died during the Civil War. It was his request that "the course of instruction should be such as would tend to make female scholars equal to all the practical duties of life; such a course of education as would enable them to compete, and successfully, too, with their brothers throughout the world when they take their part in the actual duties of life." In admitting applicants to the seminary "the preference should always be given to the poor and the orphan."

The town of Exeter received the bequest, about US$250,000, and carried out the provisions of the will by placing the fund in the hands of trustees, chosen by and responsible to it—then borrowed US$100,000, giving their note, principal and interest, payable all or in part, on demand of the trustees, who were expected to make tuition free to all female children of the town, with books and stationery, and further deducting from the income thus reduced all expenses for repairs, improvement on grounds, and all pecuniary expenses.

A plan for the establishment and regulation of the seminary was carefully elaborated by a committee, adopted by the town, and received the sanction of the legislature of New Hampshire. The advantages offered by the school were extended to "any girl resident in the town who had reached the age of nine years and was qualified for the grammar school," without the payment of tuition.

A school was opened in 1867 in the old town hall. A tract of land of nearly 16 acres (6.5 ha) was secured, and on July 4, 1868, the corner stone of the seminary building was laid. In 1869, the structure was completed. The seminary went into operation in September of the same year.

== Administration ==
The fund and school were under the management of a board of trustees chosen by the town.

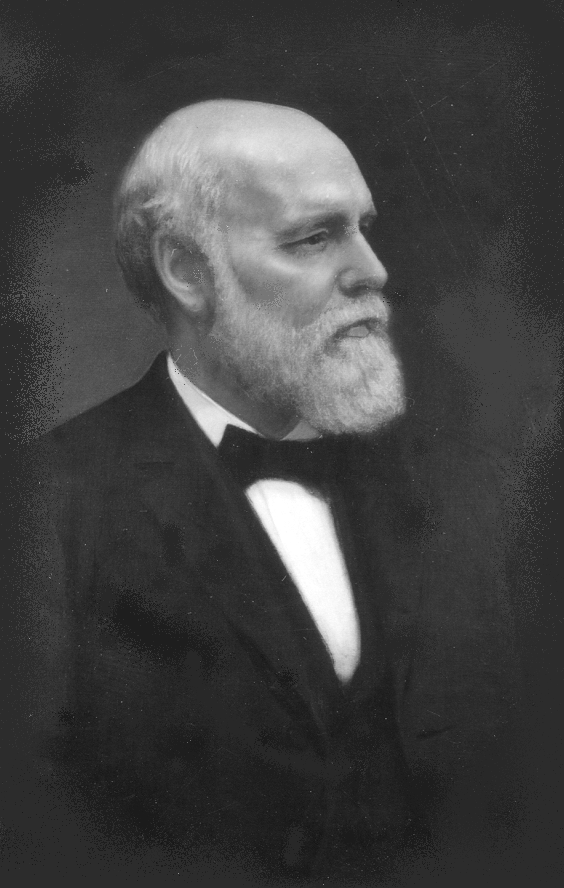
Eben S. Stearns

Eben S. Stearns, a graduate of Harvard College in 1841, was the first principal. He remained at the head of the seminary until 1875, during which time the school was thoroughly organized and very prosperous. Three years after organization there were nine instructors and 252 students. His successors during the following eight years were Harriet E. Paine and Annie M. Kilham. In 1883, George N. Cross, A. M., was appointed principal.

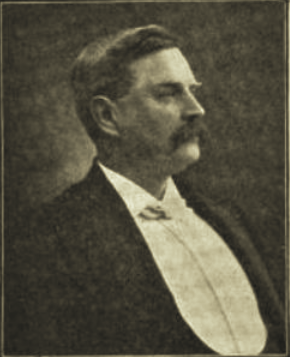
George N. Cross

When Cross arrived at the Robinson seminary in 1883, it was a critical time in the history of the school. The seminary had been in existence for 13 years and was suffering from the poverty resulting from depleted funds. The new principal went to work developing policies and a practical course of study. Within a few years, from an obscure school possessing not much more than extensive grounds and a bare, unfurnished building, Robinson seminary became a school known all over New England, housed in one of the most beautiful school buildings in the country. Years before art decorations in schools had been suggested elsewhere, Cross had hung the walls of his schoolrooms all over with costly and beautiful pictures and had lined the corridors with casts of Greek and Roman sculpture. But the extensive art collections were not merely for ornament. Every picture, bust and bas-relief had some share in Cross' plan for making real and vivid the lessons in history, mythology, or literature, as well as the history of art. After 23 years of service, Cross retired to devote his time to lecturing.

The corps of instructors consisted of the principal and assistants.

Most of the students of the seminary lived in Exeter, though nonresidents could be admitted upon the payment of a small tuition fee, and a few such were always in the school.

== Architecture and fittings ==
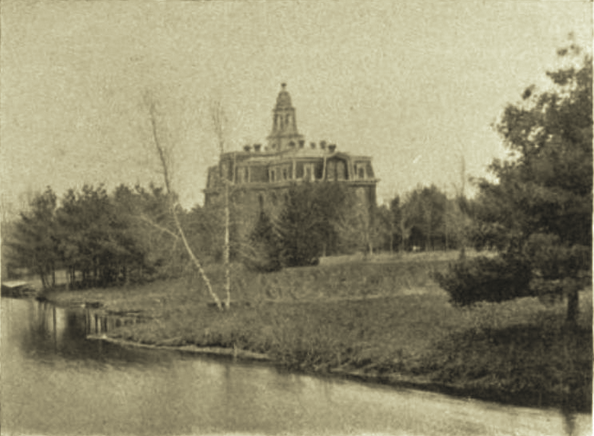
1894

Designed by architect Rufus Sargent, the seminary was built of brick, with a granite basement, and three stories in height.

It was furnished with a reference library, containing more than 6,000 volumes. There was extensive apparatus for illustrating natural philosophy and physiology, a dissecting microscope, and a Bausch & Lomb's student's microscope, with eyepieces and objectives of high and low powers. There were cabinets of minerals and geological specimens, a set of Henslow's botanical charts, together with various other maps and charts. A chemical laboratory and lecture room were fitted up for courses in general chemistry and qualitative analysis.

The Robinson seminary placed itself alongside the Norwich Free Academy by the purchase of several hundred rare engravings, etchings, busts, and statuary, so that in the various halls, rooms, and stairways there was rare art, classical and historical. Cross began this collection through the various entertainments by the school, but later, substantial gifts were made.

== Course of study ==
The course of study was arranged to extend over a period of eight years. There was also a course preparatory to admission to college of three years. As complete an education could be obtained at the seminary as at almost any other institution of the kind in the U.S. The great majority of the pupils did not complete the course. Out of an attendance of from 150 to 200, the number of graduates by 1898 averaged yearly about 10 only. But far the larger number of the pupils remained long enough to acquire an adequate education.

In planning the education of the girls, Cross kept in view three ends: the development of the homemaking spirit and the dignity of domesticity, the cultivation of self-dependence, and the ability to earn an honorable livelihood; and for those who desired it, a thorough preparation for a college course.

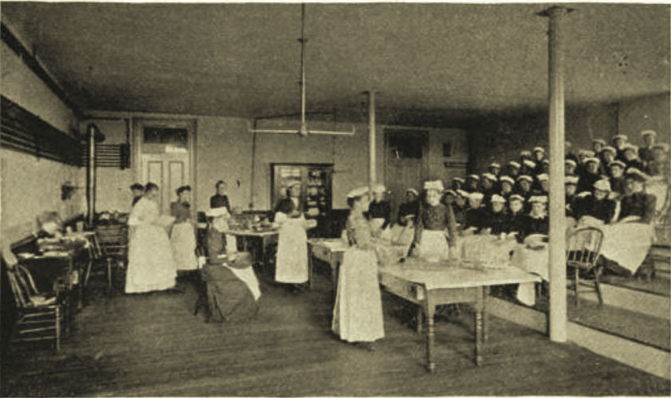
Class in Domestic Science

Robinson seminary was the second school in the U.S. to introduce domestic science into its course. Its demonstration kitchen furnished a model to be adopted by hundreds of schools. Cooking lessons were taught by a graduate of the Boston Cooking School.

For many years, a post-graduate course in pedagogy and methods of teaching was given to those graduates who desired to teach, and many of New England's teachers gained from that course their first knowledge of the science.

== Closing ==
The Robinson Seminary served as the town of Exeter's public school for girls beyond the elementary school level until 1955. Boys in those years attended Tuck High School. In 1954 the town's school district passed a bond issue to build an addition to Tuck School, creating Exeter High School, which saw the graduation of its first coeducational class in 1956. The Robinson Seminary building was destroyed by a fire in October 1961, and the site is now occupied by the Lincoln Street Elementary School.

== Notable people ==
=== Alumni ===
- Alice Brown (writer) (1857–1948), novelist, poet, playwright
- Dudley Dudley (politician) (born 1936), political activist
- Mary Lemist Titcomb (1852–1932), librarian

=== Faculty ===
- Anna Barrows (1861–1948), educator, author
- Mary Stuart James MacMurphy (1846–1934), teacher, lecturer, clubwoman, author
