= DARCEE =

The DARCEE teaching method is named after the Demonstration and Research Center for Early Education which was established in 1966 and directed by Susan Gray at the George Peabody College of Nashville, Tennessee. The teaching method is focused towards preschool children, especially those from low income homes, in an effort to foster and develop attitudes and skills that will support future learning.
