= Project Re-ED =

US educational program

Project Re-ED, the Project on the Re-Education of Emotionally Disturbed Children, is a program to provide effective and affordable mental health services for children. The program focuses on teaching a child effective ways of acting in and responding to the child's social groups (family, schools, peer groups) and also working with those social groups to help them provide a more supportive environment for the child. It began as a pilot project in the 1960s at two residential facilities in Tennessee and North Carolina. It later expanded to more facilities, and the principles of treatment developed in the project have been replicated and adapted in many other programs.

== History ==
The program was initiated by an 8-year grant awarded in 1961 by the National Institute of Mental Health to the George Peabody College for Teachers (then a separate school, now part of Vanderbilt University) along with the states of Tennessee and North Carolina. Nicholas Hobbs, a psychology professor and chair the Division of Human Development at Peabody College, was the project's primary developer. The two states each provided a small residential school – Cumberland House in Nashville, TN and Wright School in Durham, NC – and at the end of the grant period the states assumed responsibility for continuing and funding the program. Within a couple of decades, more than two dozen re-ed schools had been established, and many more facilities had applied principles developed in the re-ed program.

The program was a response to a 1954 study from the Southern Regional Education Board and the National Institute of Mental Health which noted the lack of adequate services and facilities for emotionally disturbed children available at the time in the southeast United States. The structure of the Re-ED program was inspired in large part by residential programs in post-World War II Scotland and France addressing mental health needs in children resulting from effects of the war. These programs were staffed largely by teachers who received primarily on-the-job practical training in psychological therapy. Following that model, Project Re-ED carefully selected effective, experienced teachers with demonstrated adaptability and creativity, and provided them with one year of graduate level practical and theoretical training in working with emotionally disturbed children.

== Philosophy ==
Development of the program was guided by social learning theory and ecological theory, and the program takes an educational rather than a therapeutic approach.

Following social learning theory, the program considers it important to focus on assisting children to learn new and more positive ways to interact with others in a social setting.

Following ecological theory, the program emphasizes a holistic approach of addressing issues in the family, school, peer group, and other social settings of a child's life together at the same time. This way, counsellors can see how troubling issues in each of these social settings influence each other, rather than addressing each setting in isolation.

The approach of the re-education method is to view emotionally disturbed children's problems as symptoms resulting from problems in the child's social settings. So, rather than seeing the goal as curing a child's mental illness in long-term private, individual therapy, the program seeks to restructure a child's environment and teach the child how to act more constructively and positively within that environment.

== Evaluation ==
Follow-up studies indicate that the program does effectively attain its goal of restoring and improving social operation of children and their environment in a relatively short amount of time (with an average stay in the program of about 7 months) relative to similar children not in the program. A study of the results in children ages 6–12 found a substantial reduction in problem behaviors among former students in the program, with greater gains associated with younger age and a longer stay in the program. Another study found positive results among adolescents in the program, including among students who had not done well in other programs. Both of these studies noted, however, the difficulty of determining what specific aspects of such a program influence which positive results. In general, the program is judged a viable and effective means of providing help to emotionally disturbed children.
