= Theodore Wachs =

American psychologist

Theodore D. Wachs
- Born: February 6, 1941 (age 85); Brooklyn, New York, U.S.
- Education: Muhlenberg College; Peabody College
- Awards: Golestan Fellow at the Netherlands Institute for Advanced Study; Muhlenberg College Alumni Achievement Award in Psychology – Child Development (2017)
- Scientific career
- Fields: Psychology
- Institutions: Purdue University
- Thesis: Free-recall learning in children as a function of directional motivation orientation, intelligence, and chronological age (1968)

Theodore D. Wachs (born February 6, 1941) is an American psychologist and professor in the Department of Psychological Sciences at Purdue University. He has studied the effects of environmental factors, such as noise, on children's mental development. He has also conducted research in the field of behavioral genetics. Wachs was one of the founders of the Global Child Development Group in 2007.
