= Mary Lemist Titcomb =

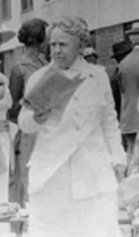
- Born: May 16, 1852; Farmington, New Hampshire
- Died: June 5, 1932 (aged 80)
- Occupation: librarian

Mary Lemist Titcomb (1852 – 1932) was a librarian who developed an early American bookmobile and helped establish a county library system in Washington County, Maryland.

== Early life and career ==
Mary Lemist Titcomb was born in Farmington, New Hampshire, on May 16, 1852. In 1873, she graduated from Robinson Female Seminary in Exeter, New Hampshire. Titcomb first learned of the profession of librarianship in a church bulletin. Because there was no formal librarian training at that time, she began working as an unpaid apprentice librarian at the Concord Public Library in Massachusetts. After that, she was hired as a cataloger at the Rutland Public Library in Vermont, where she worked for twelve years and became chief librarian. Titcomb was also elected as secretary of the first Vermont Library Commission.

In 1902, Titcomb took a job as head librarian at the Washington County Free Library in Hagerstown, Maryland, which had opened in 1901 as only the second county library in the United States. Titcomb was an outsider in the Hagerstown community, described as "frosty in manner," prim, proper, and pudgy, who always wore white gloves and a hat. Yet she quickly popularized the library, creating attractive bulletin board displays and trying to attract young readers through the children's department. She also expanded the reach of the library, sending boxes of 30 books each to stores, post offices, and other public places located in remote areas. Within two years, she had set up 22 of these deposit stations; within five years, there were 66.

== Bookmobile ==
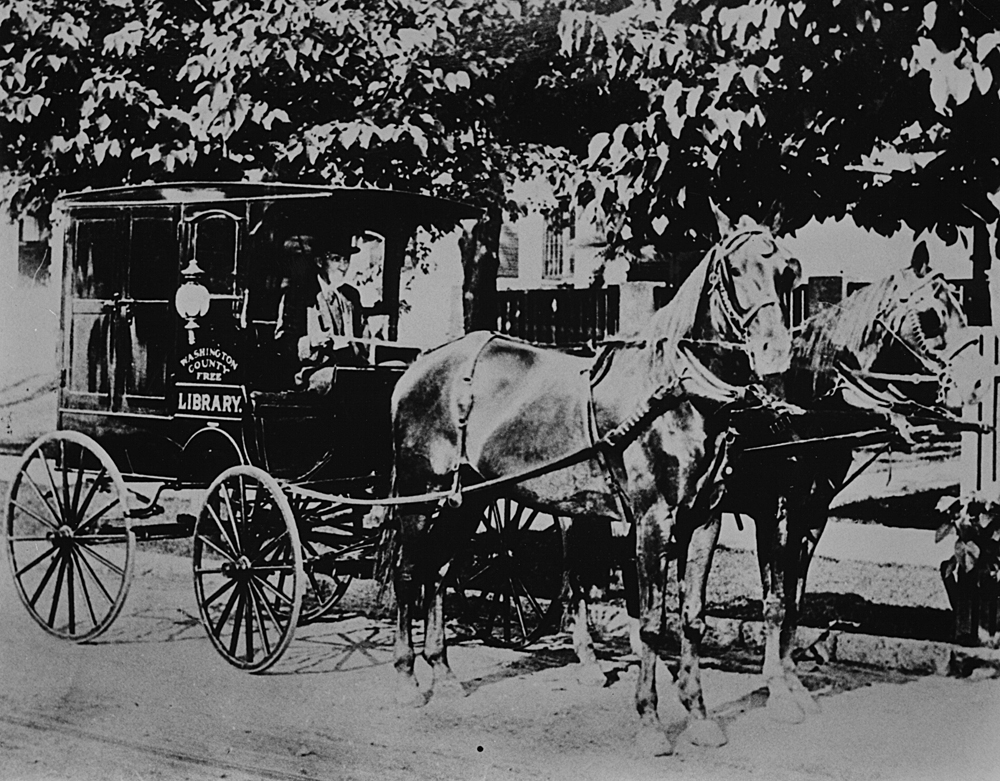
Early Washington County Free Library book wagon

Despite the expansion of the Washington County Free Library's services, Titcomb wanted to reach more people who lived in isolated areas. To bring the library to these rural areas, in 1904, Titcomb developed an early American bookmobile, or "book wagon." She later wrote of her motivation: “Would not a Library Wagon, the outward and visible signs of the service for which the Library stood, do much more in cementing friendship? ... No better method has ever been devised for reaching the dweller in the country. The book goes to the man, not waiting for the man to come to the book."

The Board of Trustees of the library obtained a Carnegie gift of $2,500 to fund the wagon. The first book wagon was a horse-drawn Concord wagon, which could transport 2,560 volumes stored on shelves on the outside and storage space inside the wagon. The library janitor, Joshua Thomas, drove the wagon, as he was a county native, familiar with the geography of the county and its residents. In the first six months, the book wagon made 31 trips, averaged 30 miles traveled per day, and distributed 1,008 volumes. Titcomb gave specific orders not to rush from house to house, but to allow each family enough time to choose their books.

In 1910, the wagon was hit by a freight train while crossing a railroad track. Thomas and his horses were not seriously injured, but the wagon was destroyed, and the book wagon service was discontinued for a year. The library board treasurer William Kealhofer contributed $2,500 to fund a new book wagon, which was an International Harvester truck. The truck had a specially constructed top with shelves for 300 books and room for four deposit station cases. This new truck allowed the library to expand their service and cover each route three times per year. Nellie Chrissinger, assistant librarian, was director of the book wagon from 1912 to 1932, and traveled on the book wagon to help answer questions and select books.

== Library training school & professional service ==
Titcomb recognized the need for training of library personnel and started an official training class at the Washington County Free Library in 1924. Although smaller than other library schools of the time, it offered a comparable curriculum. The training class continued until 1931.

In 1914, Titcomb was elected as the second vice president of the American Library Association. She was also a member of the Women's Club in the American Library Association and chairman of the Regional Training Class of the American Library Association.

== Death and legacy ==
Titcomb died in 1932 at the age of 80. She was buried in Sleepy Hollow Cemetery (Concord, Massachusetts) in Concord, Massachusetts. In 1990, she was inducted into the Maryland Women's Hall of Fame. Both Titcomb and her sister, Lydia Folsom Titcomb Howell, were buried in unmarked graves in the Sleepy Hollow Cemetery. Author Sharlee Mullins Glenn raised money for Howell's headstone, and the Friends of Sleepy Hollow Cemetery funded a headstone for Titcomb, both of which were unveiled in 2015.

== Bibliography ==
- A County Library and On the trail of the book wagon; two papers read at the meeting of the American Library Association ... June 1909 (1909)
- Book Wagons: The County Library with Rural Book Delivery (with Mary Frank Mason) (1921)
- Story of the Washington County Free Library (1931)
