= Nicholas Hobbs =

American psychologist

- Born: March 13, 1915; Greenville, South Carolina
- Died: January 23, 1983 (aged 67); Nashville, Tennessee
- Education: The Citadel; Ohio State University
- Known for: Past president, American Psychological Association
- Scientific career
- Fields: Psychology

Nicholas Hobbs (March 13, 1915 – January 23, 1983) was an American psychologist and a past president of the American Psychological Association (APA).

== Biography ==
Hobbs graduated from The Citadel in Charleston, South Carolina in 1936. He then moved to Ohio State University where he studied under Carl Rogers and Sidney Pressey. He received his master's in educational psychology in 1938. During World War II, he served in the Air Force and directed the Aviation Psychology Program, helping to establish the selection process for that branch of the military. He would then return to Ohio State University and receive his PhD in educational psychology in 1946. He served as the director of the clinical psychology program at Teachers College, Columbia University, from 1946 to 1950. At Columbia University, he met Mary Thompson among his graduate students there and they married in 1949. Nicholas became chair of the psychology department at Louisiana State University from 1950 to 1951, then moved to chair the Division of Human Development at George Peabody College for Teachers (then a separate school, now part of Vanderbilt University) where he served until 1965. He resigned from this post in order to take on the role of director of the John F. Kennedy Center for Research on Education and Human Development, now known as the Vanderbilt Kennedy Center, which he and Susan Gray established. In the academic year of 1954–1955, he taught as a visiting professor in the psychology department at Harvard University. From 1956 to 1960 he worked as a visiting lecturer at the Institute of Humanistic Studies of the University of Pennsylvania. He served as provost of Vanderbilt University from 1967 to 1975, after which he helped to found the Vanderbilt Institute for Public Policy Studies, establishing and serving as the first director of that Institute's Center for the Study of Families and Children until retiring in 1980.

Throughout his life, Hobbs also served on a number of regional and national boards. In the early 1950s, he directed the Southern Regional Education Board. His involvement there led to the establishment of the Commission on Mental Health. He chaired the APA committee that created the organization's first code of ethics, introduced in 1953. In the late 1950s, he was the vice-chair of the board of trustees of the Joint Commission on Mental Health and Illness. This enterprise would help to embolden the deinstitutionalization movement and put emphasis on community care for the mentally ill. Based in part on his experience during World War II of helping to establish the selection process for the United States Air Force, he was appointed the first director of selection for the Peace Corps by President John F. Kennedy in 1961.

Also in 1961 Hobbs initiated an 8-year pilot project to address the need for effective and affordable mental health programs for children. Project Re-ED, for the re-education of emotionally disturbed children, was funded by a National Institutes of Health grant involving residential programs at the Cumberland House in Nashville, Tennessee, and the Wright School in Durham, North Carolina. The innovative program emphasized teaching rather than therapy and addressing the child's full environment (family, school, neighborhood) rather than treating the child separately, with the goal of teaching children and their caregivers more effective and constructive ways of addressing and overcoming problem situations. His report of the results was published in his book The Troubled and Troubling Child in 1982, by which time the project included or influenced many more schools across the United States.

Hobbs was the 1966 American Psychological Association president. He would also become the vice president of the Joint Commission on Mental Health of Children that same year. The report the commission presented would lead to the conception of child advocacy and early bills such as an amendment to the Elementary and Secondary Education Act made to include the handicapped, disadvantaged, and mentally ill youth.

In 1972, Edward Zigler, director of the Office of Child Development, and Elliot Richardson, the U.S. Secretary of Health, Education, and Welfare, organized a major effort to standardize and disseminate appropriate diagnostic procedures for classifying and categorizing children with special needs. This resulted in the Project on Classification of Exceptional Children, which Hobbs directed. The task force sought to balance the concerns of accurately classifying special needs of children in order to better facilitate providing help, with the concerns of such a label stigmatizing a child and limiting subsequent expectations and opportunities. The results of this task force were presented in two publications: Issues in the Classification of Children, a two-volume collection of papers by members of the task force which Hobbs edited, and The Futures of Children authored by Hobbs. Hobbs also served on the National Advisory Mental Health Council, a policy board that advises the Secretary of Health and Human Services, the director of the National Institutes of Health, and the director of the National Institute of Mental Health.

He received the two APA Awards in 1980; one for Distinguished Professional Contributions to Institutional Practice, another for Distinguished Professional Contributions to Psychology in Public Interest.

The Nicholas Hobbs Society at the Vanderbilt Kennedy Center raises money for research into developmental disabilities. APA Division 37 awards the Nicholas Hobbs Award for child policy and advocacy.

== Publications ==
Selected list of books and articles by Nicholas Hobbs:

- Hobbs, N (1948). "The Development of a Code of Ethical Standards for Psychology". American Psychologist. 3 (3): 80–84. doi:10.1037/h0060281.
- Hobbs, N. (1951). Group-Centered Psychotherapy. In C. R. Rogers (Ed.), Client-Centered Therapy: Its Current Practice, Implications, and Theory. Boston, MA: Houghton Mifflin Co.
- Hobbs, N. (1955). Client-Centered Psychotherapy. In J. L. McCary (Ed.), Six Approaches to Psychotherapy. New York, NY: Dryden Press.
- Hobbs, N (1959). "Science and Ethical Behavior". American Psychologist. 14 (5): 217–225. doi:10.1037/h0046389.
- Hobbs, N. (1960). Motivation to High Achievement. In B. Schertzer (Ed.), Working with Superior Students: Theories and Practices (pp. 247–264). Chicago, IL: Science Research Associates.
- Hobbs, N (1963). "A Psychologist in the Peace Corps". American Psychologist. 18 (1): 47–55. doi:10.1037/h0048304.
- Hobbs, N (1964). "Mental Health's Third Revolution". American Journal of Orthopsychiatry. 34 (5): 822–833. doi:10.1111/j.1939-0025.1964.tb02237.x. PMID 14220511.
- Hobbs, N. (1965). How the Re-ED Plan Developed. In N. Long, J., W. C. Morse & R. G. Newman (Eds.), Conflict in the Classroom: The Education of Emotionally Disturbed Children (pp. 286–294). Belmont, CA: Wadsworth Publishing Co.
- Hobbs, N (1966). "Helping Disturbed Children: Psychological and Ecological Strategies". American Psychologist. 21 (12): 1105–1115. doi:10.1037/h0021115. PMID 5980699.
- Hobbs, N (1973). "The Project on Classification of Exceptional Children". Journal of Abnormal Child Psychology. 1 (1): 121–124. doi:10.1007/BF00917893. PMID 24198134. S2CID 23013204.
- Hobbs, N. (1975). The Futures of Children. San Francisco, CA: Jossey-Bass Publishers.
- Hobbs, N. (1982). The Troubled and Troubling Child. San Francisco, CA: Jossey-Bass Publishers.
- Hobbs, N.; Robinson, S. (1982). "Adolescent Development and Public Policy". American Psychologist. 37 (2): 212–223. doi:10.1037/0003-066X.37.2.212. PMID 7091865.
- Hobbs, N. (1984). Strengthening Families. San Francisco: Jossey-Bass.
- Hobbs, N., & Perrin, J. M. (1985). Issues in the Care of Children with Chronic Illness. San Francisco, CA: Jossey-Bass Publishers.
