= Global Child Development Group =

- Abbreviation: GCDG
- Formation: October 13, 2007; 18 years ago
- Founder: Patrice Engle; Sally Grantham-McGregor; Maureen Black; Betsy Lozoff; Julie Meeks; Theodore Wachs; Susan Walker
- Founded at: Triangolo lariano
- Type: Non-governmental organization

The Global Child Development Group (GCDG) is an international, non-governmental organization founded in Triangolo lariano, Italy, in 2007, with a focus on the promotion of research, practice and policies focused on child development. The organization has a particular emphasis on children's social, cognitive, emotional, behavioural and motor development.

== History ==
The Secretariat of the Global Child Development Group is located at the Caribbean Child Development Centre, Open Campus, University of the West Indies, Jamaica. It is governed by a steering committee which includes faculty from the university. The organization has released a variety of studies which have documented the risks that young children face in low and middle income countries, and the characteristics of interventions that are most likely to be effective. These include the Early Childhood Development Lancet Series of 2007 and 2011 as well as the D-Score Group.

== Organizational mission ==
The organizational mission and goals of the Global Child Development Group are:

1. To use scientific evidence to promote optimal child development, with a focus on children under age 5, in low and middle income countries.
2. To review, evaluate and disseminate information on child development, including links with health and nutrition, risk/protective factors, and intervention.
3. To encourage/promote research and research capacity in child development in low and middle-income countries.
4. To advocate for early childhood policy and programs based on the best available scientific evidence.

The organization supports the Convention on the Rights of the Child and is a member of the Union of International Associations.

== Affiliations ==
GCDG has received financial and operational support from UNICEF and UN Sustainable Development. The organization has also received funding from the Bernard van Leer Foundation and Rockefeller Foundation and has been supported by the American Psychological Association.
