= Gabriel Compayré =

French scholar of pedagogy and politician

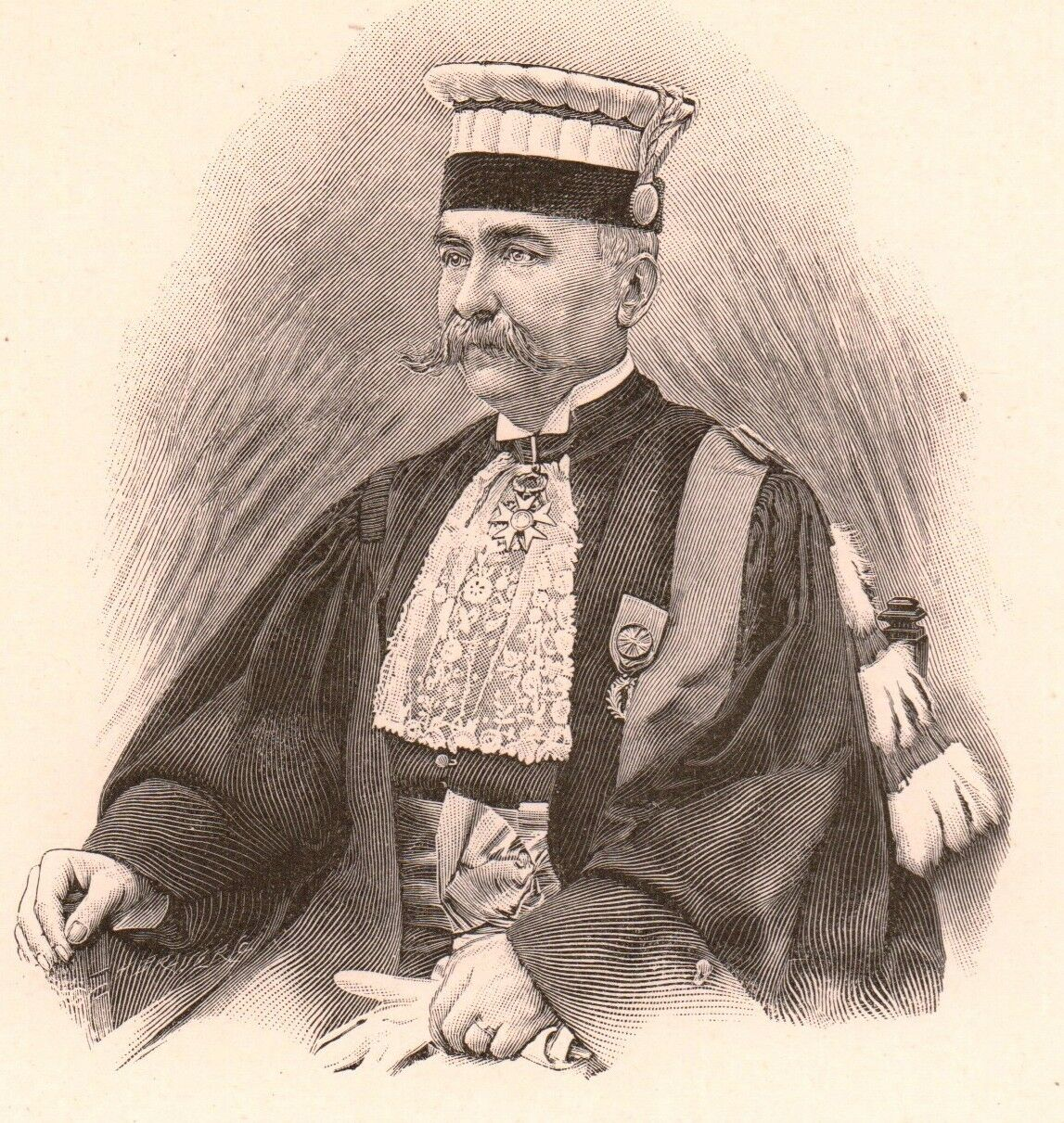
- Born: 2 January 1843; Albi, France
- Died: 23 March 1913 (aged 70); Paris, France
- Education: Lycée Louis-le-Grand; École normale supérieure de lettres et sciences humaines
- Occupations: Scholar, politician

Gabriel Compayré was a French scholar of pedagogy and politician.

== Early life ==
Gabriel Compayré was born on 2 January 1843 in Albi, France.

Compayré was educated at the Lycée Louis-le-Grand. He graduated from the École normale supérieure de lettres et sciences humaines and passed the Agrégation in philosophy in 1866. He received a doctorate in philosophy in 1873, with a thesis about David Hume.

== Career ==
Compayré taught high school philosophy in Pau, Poitiers and Toulouse. He taught philosophy at the University of Toulouse. He was the author of many books on pedagogy. He also wrote books about Peter Abelard and Herbert Spencer. Some of his books were translated into English by William H. Payne.

Compayré served in the National Assembly from 1881 to 1889, serving as deputy to Lavaur. He lost his reelection bid to Charles Poulié in 1889.

Compayré was a Commander of the Legion of Honour.

== Publications ==
- Histoire critique des doctrines de l’éducation en France (1879)
- Histoire de la pédagogie. 1800. (extended version of Histroire critique, published after 1879) - translated by W.H. Payne (1888). History of Pedagogy. Swan Sonnenschein, Lowrey.
- Éléments d’éducation civique (1881), a work placed on the index at Rome, but very widely read in the primary schools of France
- Cours de pédagogie théorique et pratique (1885, 13th ed., 1897)
- The Intellectual and Moral Development of the Child, in English (2 vols., New York, 1896–1902)
- A series of monographs on Les Grands Éducateurs.

== Death ==
Compayré died on March 23, 1913, in Paris, France.
