= William H. Payne =

American educator and translator

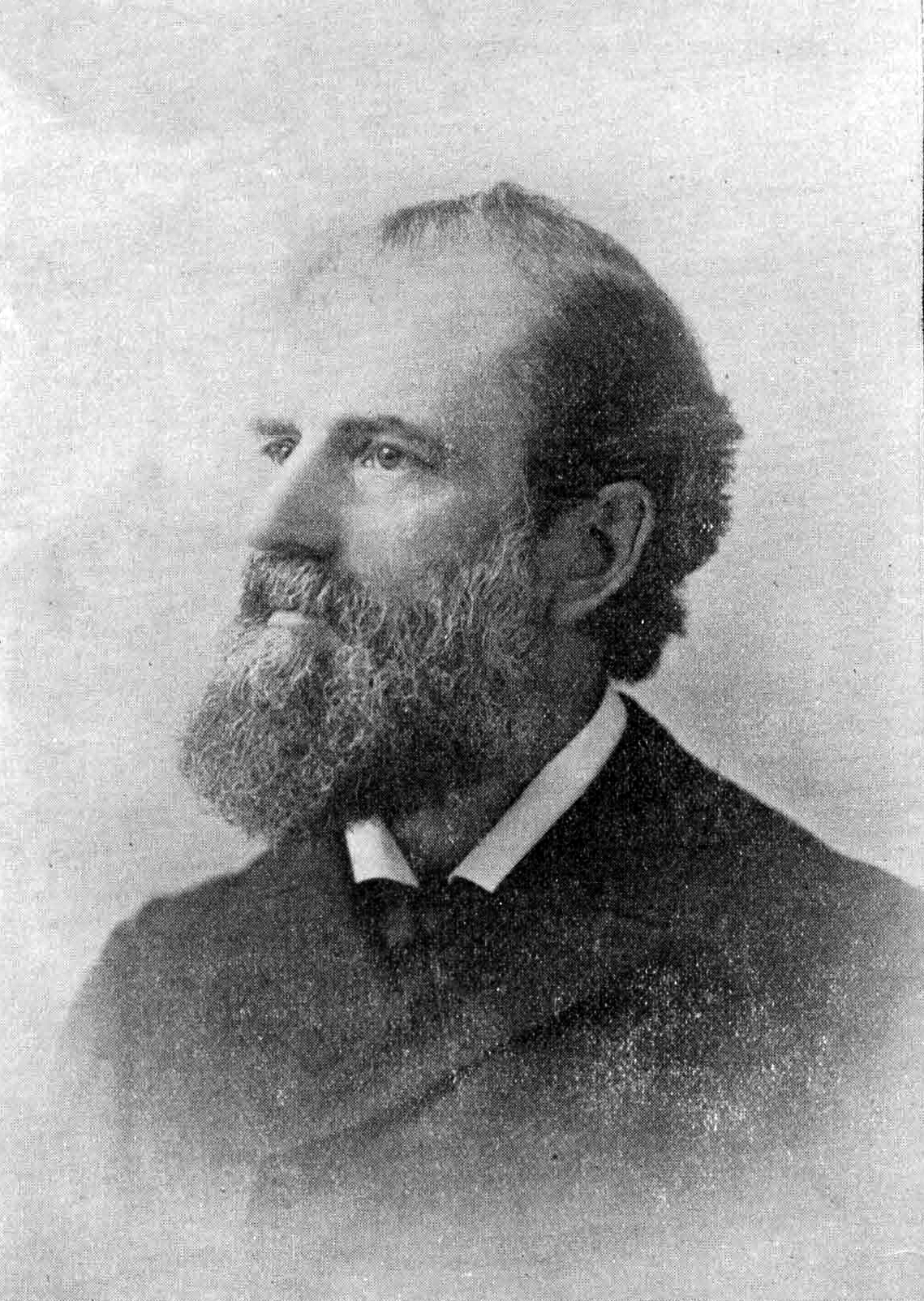
- Born: William Harold Payne; May 12, 1836; Farmington, New York, U.S.
- Died: June 18, 1907 (aged 71); Ann Arbor, Michigan, U.S.
- Education: University of Michigan; University of Nashville
- Spouses: Eva S. Fort (m. 1856; died 1899) Elizabeth Clark (m. 1901)
- Children: 1 son, 4 daughters

William Harold Payne (May 12, 1836 – June 18, 1907) was an American educator and translator. As professor of the Science and Art of Teaching at the University of Michigan in 1879, he was the first university professor of pedagogy in the United States. He served as the chancellor of the University of Nashville and the president of Peabody College (both of which later merged with Vanderbilt University) from 1887 to 1901.

== Early life ==
William H. Payne was born on May 12, 1836, in Farmington, New York. He was educated in state schools in New York, which offered classes in the winter months, until he attended the Macedon Academy for three years and the Charlotteville Seminary for a couple of months. Much of his education was self-taught.

Payne received a master of arts in 1872 and a legum doctor in 1888 from the University of Michigan. He received an honorary doctor of letters in 1897 from the Western University of Pennsylvania. Payne also received a doctorate from the University of Nashville.

== Career ==
Payne taught schoolchildren in Victor, New York, in 1856-1857. He served as the principal of the Union School in Three Rivers, Michigan, from 1858 to 1864. He was the superintendent of schools in Niles, Michigan, from 1864 to 1866. He served as the principal of the Holy Ghost Seminary in Ypsilanti, Michigan, from 1866 to 1869. Meanwhile, from 1864 to 1869, he was the editor and publisher of The Michigan Teacher, a review of pedagogy. He served as superintendent of schools in Adrian, Michigan, from 1869 to 1879.

Payne was appointed as the first professor of the Science and Art of Teaching at the University of Michigan by the Board of Regents in 1879. He was the first holder of a chair in pedagogy in any university in the United States. He established the Department of Education.

Replacing the late Eben S. Stearns, Payne served as the second chancellor of the University of Nashville and the president of Peabody College from 1887 to 1901. He was critical in working with the Peabody Education Fund to shape the future of the college. Under his leadership, the faculty went from 12 to 38. When he stepped down, he was succeeded by former Governor James D. Porter, who moved the Peabody College campus across the street from Vanderbilt University. Meanwhile, Payne returned to the University of Michigan in 1901.

Payne was the author of several books on pedagogy. He "consistently supported compulsory education, financed and supervised by the state." Instead of experience, he encouraged "academic pursuits." Moreover, he believed education to be "the most conservative of all arts." Indeed, he opposed innovation in teaching methods. Furthermore, he believed women were not qualified to teach senior years, science or mathematics, nor were they qualified to serve as superintendent or chancellor.

Payne translated Emile, or On Education by Jean-Jacques Rousseau and The History of Pedagogy by Gabriel Compayré from French into English.

== Personal life ==
Payne married Eva S. Fort in October 1856. After she died in 1899, he married Elizabeth Clark in 1901. He had a son, W.R. Payne, and four daughters: Mrs Henry McClelland, Mrs Tillman Jones, Mrs John A. Murkin, and Mrs B.F. Fields.

== Death ==
Payne died on June 18, 1907, in Ann Arbor, Michigan.

== Bibliography ==
- Chapters on School Supervision: A Practical Treatise in Superintendence, Grading, Arranging Courses of Study; The Preparation and Use of Blanks, Records, and Reports, Examinations for Promotion, etc. (Cincinnati; New York : Van Antwerp, Bragg & Co., c1875).
- Outlines of Educational Doctrine (Adrian, Michigan: C. Humphrey, 1882).
- Contributions to the Science of Education (New York, Harper & brothers, 1886).
- Theory and Practice of Teaching, or, The Motives and Methods of Good School-Keeping (New York : American Book Co., 1890).
