= Sylvia Lyons Render =

American academic and curator (1913–1986)

- Born: Sylvia Lyons; June 8, 1913; Atlanta, Georgia, US
- Died: February 3, 1986 (aged 72); Tampa, Florida, US
- Education: George Peabody College; Ohio State University; Tennessee State University
- Occupations: Academic, curator
- Employer(s): Library of Congress, North Carolina Central University, Florida A&M University

Sylvia Lyons Render (June 8, 1913 – February 3, 1986) was an American academic and curator. Recognized for her expertise in the life and writings of Charles W. Chestnutt, Render was the first African American to earn a doctoral degree from the Vanderbilt Peabody College of Education and the first person to hold the position of manuscript curator in African American history at the Library of Congress.

== Early life and education ==
Render was born on June 8, 1913, in Atlanta, Georgia, the only child of Lewis Rudolph Lyons and Mamie Beatrice Foster Lyons. She grew up in Tuscaloosa, Alabama, and Nashville, Tennessee, graduating from Nashville's Pearl High School. She received her Bachelor of Science degree in 1934 from Tennessee State University, where she was class valedictorian. She received an M.A. from Ohio State University in 1952, attended the University of Chicago, and became the first African American to receive a PhD from the George Peabody College for Teachers in 1962.

== Career ==
In 1950, Render began working as director of out-of-state financial aid at Florida A&M University. Between 1952 and 1964, she rose through the academic ranks from instructor to full professor. From 1964 to 1974, she was a professor of English at North Carolina Central University. She was also a visiting professor at George Peabody College for Teachers in the summer of 1970. During her academic career, she received postdoctoral grants and awards from the Ford Foundation, the American Philosophical Society, and the National Endowment for the Humanities.

In 1974, Render became manuscript curator and specialist in African American history at the Manuscript Division of the Library of Congress, becoming the first person to hold the newly created position. One of her chief responsibilities was to solicit donations of manuscripts, helping to acquire the records of the NAACP and the National Urban League. She retired on December 24, 1983. In 1981, the NAACP named her Outstanding Woman of the Year, and Governor Bob Graham recognized her as one of Florida's outstanding African American citizens in 1986.

Render was an expert in the life and writings of Charles W. Chesnutt and published numerous articles on Chestnutt. She authored the Encyclopædia Britannica article on Chestnutt as well as editing The Short Fiction of Charles W. Chestnutt (published by Howard University Press in 1974) and a biography entitled Charles W. Chesnutt (Twayne Publishers, 1980). The Charles Waddell Chesnutt Association offers the Sylvia Lyons Render Award “in recognition of outstanding scholarship on the life and works of Charles Waddell Chesnutt.”

== Personal life ==
Render moved to St. Petersburg, Florida, in 1984. She died on February 3, 1986, at Tampa General Hospital.

Render married Frank Wyatt Render in 1935 and had one son.

== Selected works ==
- The characteristics of women in the non-dramatic prose works of Robert Green, M.A., 1952
- Eagle with clipped wings : form and feeling in the fiction of Charles Waddell Chesnutt, 1962
- Afro-American women, the outstanding and the obscure, 1975
- Charles W. Chesnutt, 1980
- Folklore in the fiction of Charles W. Chestnutt : factual, funny, fantastic, forthright and functional, 1981
