= William Robinson (benefactor) =

American slave holder and benefactor

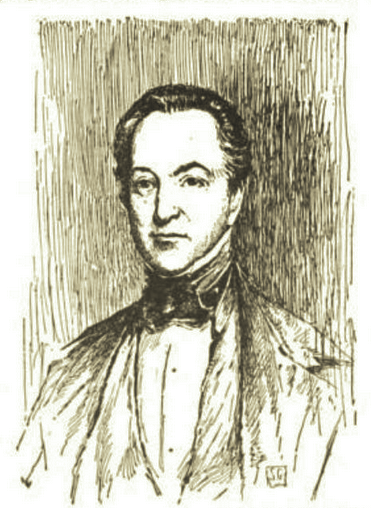

William Robinson (September 18, 1794 – May 13, 1864) was an American slave holder and benefactor of the Robinson Female Seminary in Exeter, New Hampshire, and the Summerville Academy in the Augusta, Georgia, historic district of Summerville.

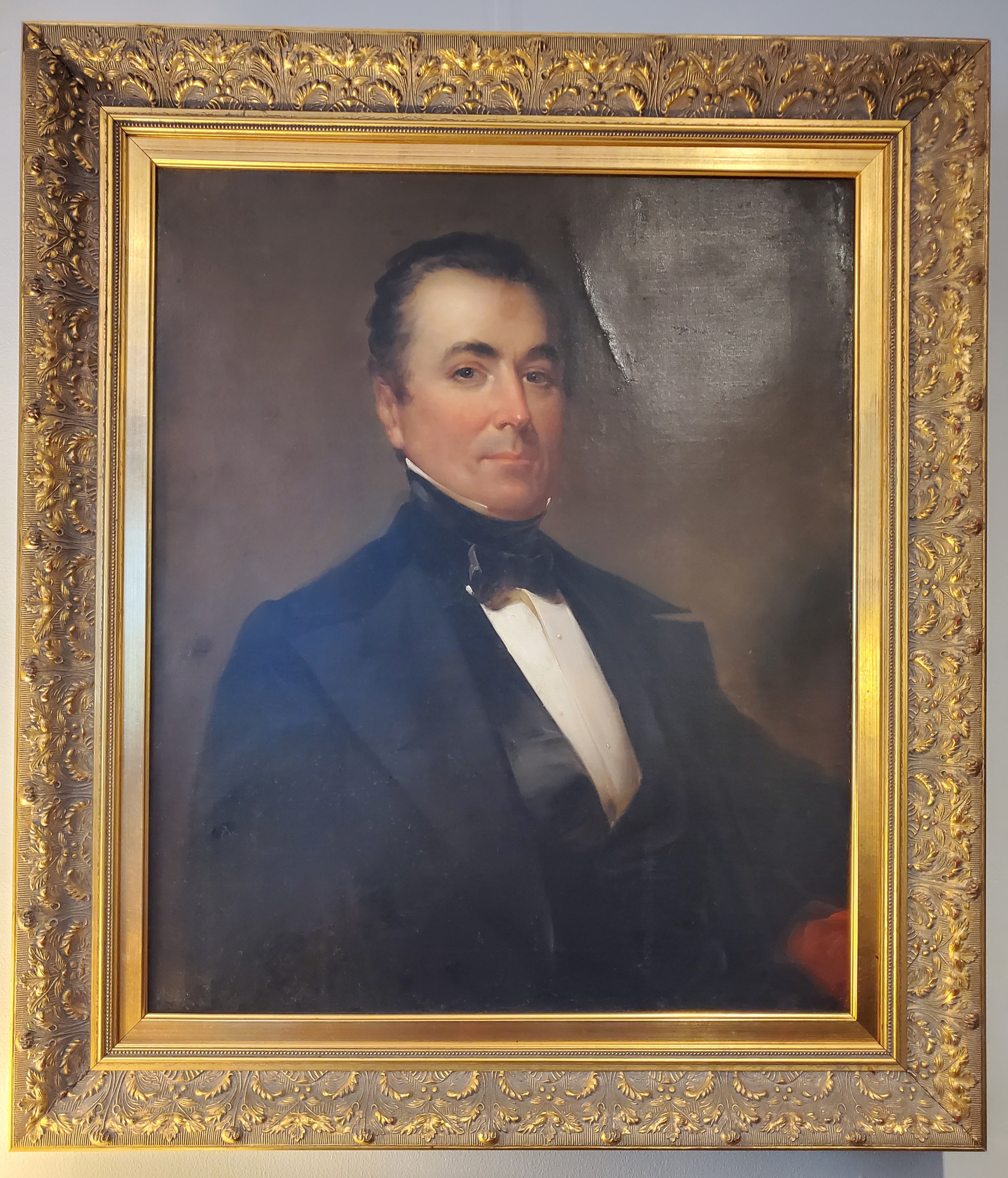
Repaired portrait of William Robinson which hung in the William Robinson grammar school in Augusta GA.

== Early life and education ==
William Robinson was born in Exeter, New Hampshire, on September 18, 1794. While a child, his parents died, and he was left without property.

He attended Phillips Exeter Academy.

== Career ==
Robinson was apprenticed to the printer's trade early in life and followed it for a time. He then left Exeter for the South and finally settled in Augusta, Georgia, where he entered into business.

He lived the rest of his life in Augusta and amassed a large fortune, most of which he invested in the North. Robinson made his will in the year 1853 in which, after legacies to his wife and relatives (he had no children), he left his property to an institution in Georgia and to found a seminary for girls in his native town.

Robinson seems to have changed his mind just before he died, and proposed leaving a comparatively limited bequest for the founding of the seminary. A new will was drawn to that effect, but he died before it could be executed.

== Death and legacy ==
Robinson died in Summerville, Georgia, on May 13, 1864.

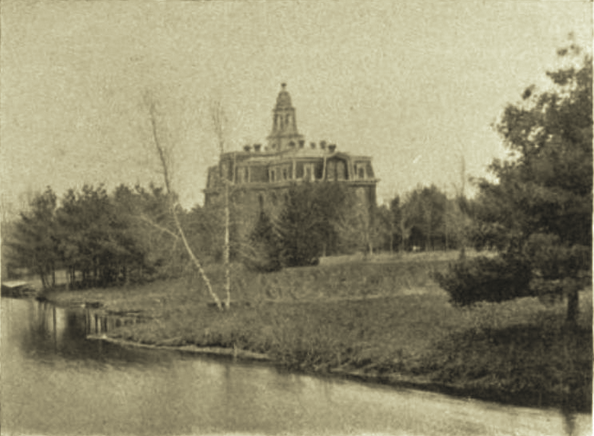
The Robinson Seminary (1894)

The Robinson Female Seminary was established in 1867 in Exeter; it closed in 1955.

A monument erected over his remains at Augusta has this inscription:—

WILLIAM ROBINSON
Born in
Exeter, N. H.,
September 18, 1794.

Died at
Summerville, Ga.,
May 13, 1864.
A resident of Augusta and vicinity for nearly fifty years, he was known as a courteous gentleman, an honorable merchant, and a benefactor to the poor. His name will be held in grateful remembrance by the people of his birthplace and of his adopted home, for the bounty which secured to their children, and children's children, the priceless benefits of education.
