= J. McRee Elrod =

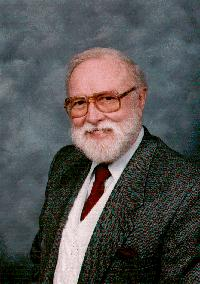
- Born: Jefferson McRee Elrod; March 23, 1932; Gainesville, Georgia
- Died: June 16, 2016 (aged 84); Metchosin, British Columbia
- Education: University of Georgia (B.A.); Peabody College (M.A., M.S.); Scarritt College for Christian Workers (M.Th.)
- Occupation: Librarian

Jefferson McRee Elrod (23 March 1932 – 16 June 2016) was a librarian, cataloguer, and Methodist and Unitarian minister. He was involved in many social causes, notably the Civil Rights Movement and anti-war movements of the 1960s and the gay pride movement.

== Background ==
Elrod worked in Korea, the United States, and Canada. He played a significant role in the creation of modern library practices in South Korea and his innovations in card cataloguing were adopted widely in the pre-digital age. He also pioneered a remote cataloguing service for special libraries.

As a minister and social activist, Elrod's beliefs and values evolved from liberal Christian to Humanist. He volunteered his efforts in support of many liberal political causes, including universal medical care, a medical rather than a criminal approach to problems created by drug addiction, as well as racial and sexual orientation equity.

== Family and education ==
Elrod, known all of his life as "Mac," was born in Gainesville, Georgia, on March 23, 1932, the only child of Angus Warren Elrod, a salesman, and Lona Mary McRee Elrod, a schoolteacher, and was christened Jefferson McRee Elrod. He subsequently rejected the name "Jefferson" because of its association with Jefferson Davis, the president of the Confederate States of America. His parents separated when he was eleven years old and he was raised by his mother, who worked as a bookkeeper and office manager. He and his mother survived the devastating Gainesville tornado tragedy of 1936. For his elementary and secondary education, he attended a special demonstration school created by the University of Georgia where student teachers could conduct their practicums. It was considered to be the best school in the area at a time when Georgia, a poor state, had two separate school systems, one for whites and one for blacks.

As a child, his opposition to the Jim Crow laws and racism was awakened when he heard some of his schoolmates hurling racial taunts at black children. As he himself knew how it felt to be ostracized and ridiculed by taunts of "fatty," the young Mac Elrod felt empathy for the black children.

Elrod obtained his B.A. in history (magna cum laude and Phi Beta Kappa) at the University of Georgia in June, 1952. He attended the George Peabody College for Teachers in Nashville, Tennessee as a Carnegie Fellow and obtained an M.A. in Information Technology in 1953. He attended Scarritt College for Christian Workers, in Nashville, Tennessee and received a Master's in Theology in August, 1954. He later obtained a third master's degree in 1960, a Master of Science in Library Science (MLS), also from Peabody College.

Elrod married Norma Lee Cummins, (1932 - ), the daughter of William "Buck" Cummins and Mary Evelyn Dunn Cummins, of Vienna, Illinois, on June 4, 1953. They met at the 16th quadrennial Student Volunteer Movement for Foreign Missions conference in Lawrence, Kansas in 1951 as delegates of their respective universities. They had six children, five surviving, including one mixed-race adopted daughter, eight grandchildren and two great-grandchildren.

Mac Elrod and his wife attended the Yale University Institute of Far Eastern Languages to learn Korean, prior to serving in Korea as educational missionaries. He was also sent to work with African-American church congregations as it would give him, a white man, experience in working in a culture different from his own.

== Librarian ==
=== South Korea ===
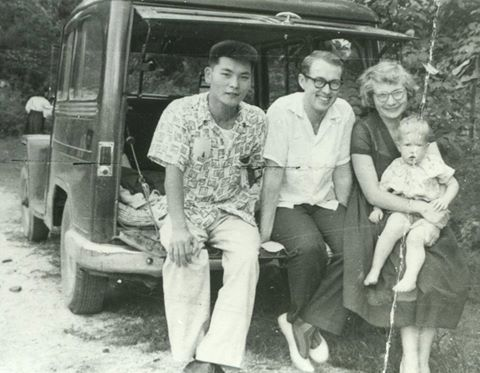
Mac and Norma Elrod in Korea

The Elrods were confirmed as missionaries to South Korea in June, 1955. Elrod lived in Seoul, South Korea with his family from 1955 to 1960, sponsored by the Methodist Board of Missions. Elrod worked as a librarian at Yonsei University. Conditions in that country were very primitive, compared to the United States. The university library had sustained some bombing damage during the Korean War; some books had to be excavated from fallen plaster before being catalogued. The building was unheated and ink froze in the inkwells overnight.

Korea has its own phonetic alphabet, (Hangul) which made it adaptable to classification systems such as the Dewey Decimal System. However, at that time, modern library procedures were not in use due to the Japanese occupation of the country from 1910 to 1945 and the suppression of the Korean language, followed by the devastating civil war.

To adapt modern library cataloguing to Korean needs, Elrod designed a card catalogue with three parts. Eastern materials were listed in a Hangul section by author, title, and the usual added entries, plus Korean index cards for the classed catalogue. Western materials were listed in a Roman alphabet section by author, title, and the usual added entries, plus English index cards to the classed catalogue. These two sections flanked a third, a class catalogue, in which all library materials were listed by class number, and which for some material, included cards under class numbers in addition to the one by which the items were shelved. All material on the shelves were interfiled by class number, regardless of language. The rebuilding of the library led to Peabody Library School (now defunct) choosing Yonsei University as the institution to sponsor Korea's first library school. Elrod taught library science at the school.

=== United States ===
The Elrods returned to the United States in 1960, and lived in Nashville, Tennessee for a year while Elrod studied for his third master's degree. In 1961 he became the librarian at Central Methodist College. They lived next door to Bishop Abel Muzorewa, later Prime Minister of Zimbabwe, and their children played together. Subsequently, Elrod served as a guest professor in Nashville, Tennessee while obtaining his Master of Library Science.

The Elrods moved to Ohio in 1963 when Elrod accepted a position as head cataloger at Ohio Wesleyan University. He supervised a re-classification from Dewey Decimal Classification (DDC) to Library of Congress Classification (LCC). At this time, the Elrods became involved in the anti-Vietnam war movement, and eventually decided to emigrate from the United States.

=== Canada ===
Elrod served as head of the cataloguing department at the University of British Columbia (UBC) from 1967 to January 1979. There he devised an easier-to-use and maintain card catalogue which divided the catalogue into subject and author title portions, referred to as the divided ticked tracing catalogue. Classification headers were not typed at the top of cards but were rather ticked, or checked, in the tracing (tracing is the term for other cards created for additional access to resources recorded at the bottom of the main entry card) and filed behind subject cards in the subject catalogue. This system greatly speeded the cataloguing process because headers did not have to be checked ahead of time, but rather returned for a guide card if not found. This practise spread across Canada, however, the appearance of the Online Public Access Catalogue (OPAC) made this distinction largely moot.

While at UBC, Elrod noticed that librarians from local special libraries used to visit the university to manually copy information from the card catalogue to assist them in cataloguing their own collections. Recognizing a need for services to medical, forestry, government, legal, and corporate libraries, Elrod left UBC and founded Special Libraries Cataloguing in January 1979. Remote library cataloguing services became possible at that time because digital services such as the University of Toronto library automation service (UTLAS) had just come to Western Canada.

=== Special Libraries Cataloguing, Inc. (SLC) ===
Established in 1979, at the dawn of the digital age of library cataloguing, SLC provides remote cataloguing services to small special libraries worldwide and increasingly provides Machine-Readable Cataloguing Standards (MARC records) for electronic publishers and aggregators as opposed to individual libraries.

=== Autocat ===
Elrod very much enjoyed participating in the automated cataloguing electronic discussion list (AutoCat listserve). His posts emphasized his belief that cataloguers should encourage practicality in cataloguing and service to patrons as a top priority. When he officially retired in March 2016 at age 84, he received numerous private accolades from colleagues from countries as diverse as Lebanon, Israel, Australia, New Zealand and Spain.

== Minister ==
=== Methodist ===
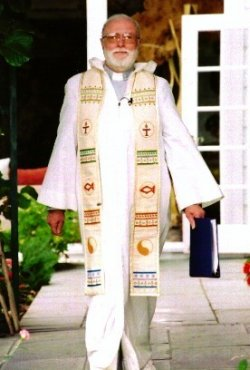
J. McRee Elrod

Elrod was ordained in the Methodist Church before going to Korea, although he did not serve as a minister there. Raised in the Methodist church, Elrod's religious views evolved, particularly when he studied the works of Adolf von Harnack while a student at Scarritt College. Harnack's scholarship elucidated the difference between the historical Jesus and his sayings and Pauline Christianity.

=== African Methodist Episcopal Church (AME) ===
Elrod's ordination was transferred to the AME after his return to the United States. While living in Ohio, Elrod volunteered to be the minister for several small African Methodist Episcopal churches. Upon moving to Vancouver, Elrod briefly revived an AME church there, serving as a volunteer minister, but the black population at the time proved too small to sustain a church. The move to Vancouver coincided with a search for a new spiritual home.

=== Unitarian ===
The Elrods attended the newly-formed North Shore (North and West Vancouver) Unitarian Church and became Unitarians. The Elrods felt that the Unitarian congregations in the Vancouver area were more responsive to helping American war-objectors than many other denominations. Elrod was admitted as a Unitarian minister in 1973. As minister of the Westminster Unitarian Church in New Westminster, Elrod officiated at hundreds of weddings, including same sex unions.

== Activism ==
=== Civil Rights Movement ===
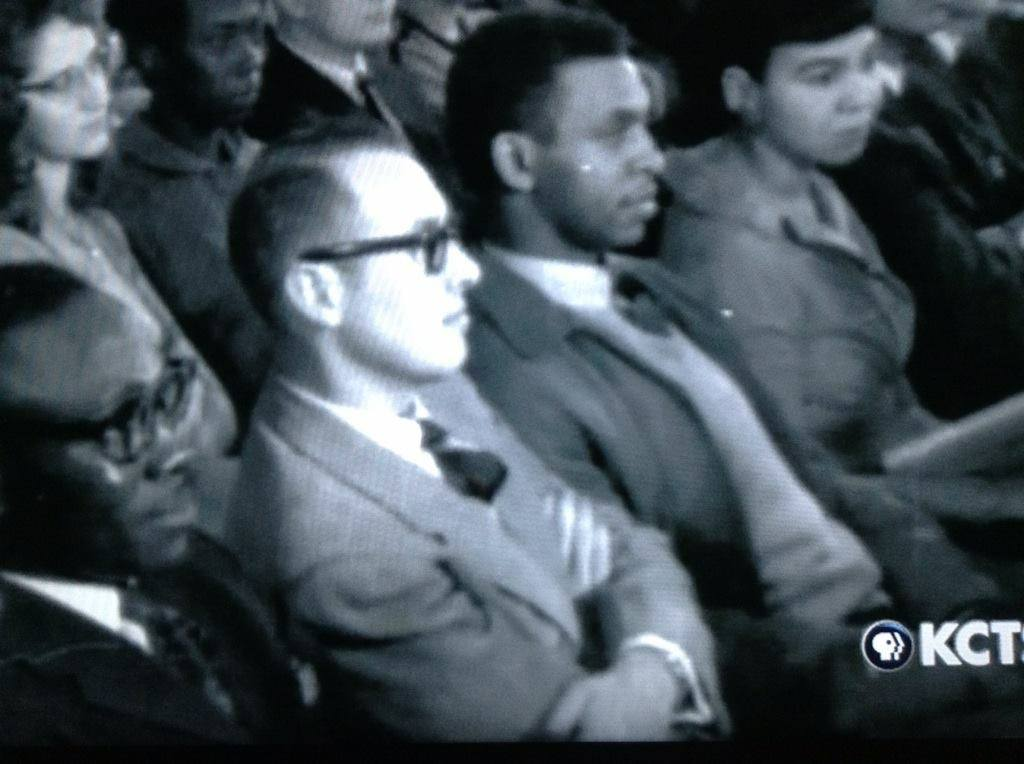

Elrod and his wife were both interested in the concept of civil disobedience to protest the unjust Jim Crow laws of the South. When boarding an interstate bus after a visit to Georgia in 1954, the young couple decided to sit in the back of the bus, in the "colored" section. The bus driver told them he could not drive the bus until they moved but they refused to change seats. Finally the driver gave up and let them stay where they were and the bus went on its way. This incident occurred before the Montgomery bus boycott and the Freedom Riders campaign.

While living in Nashville after their return from Korea, the Elrods became involved in the 1960 Nashville sit-in protests and attended the non-violence workshops led by James Lawson. As portrayed in the 2013 movie The Butler, Elrod would sometimes act the part of an abusive racist to help the young black activists prepare themselves for what they would encounter during the sit-ins. He also participated in the sit-ins themselves. The Elrods experienced some harassment and threats to their family as a result of their involvement in the movement.

Elrod, along with some of his students, volunteered to catalogue the library at the Highlander Folk School, then located in Tennessee. This school was instrumental in the civil rights movement. Rosa Parks received training there prior to the Montgomery bus boycott, and the civil rights anthem, "We Shall Overcome," was first popularized there.

=== Vietnam War ===
The Elrods moved from the United States to Vancouver, British Columbia, Canada in the summer of 1967 because of their strong opposition to the Vietnam War. Although Elrod was not subject to the draft, being, as he put it, "too old and too flat-footed," he was sympathetic to the young American men who faced conscription into the army to fight in Vietnam. With his wife, Elrod counselled and provided temporary housing for hundreds of war objectors who moved to Canada, among them Greenpeace co-founder Rex Weyler and political philosopher Mark Satin.

The Elrods worked together with an informal network of anti-war activists, including many other Unitarians. Elrod was a "central figure in the effort to aid American war resisters arriving in Canada," often interviewed by the media as he advocated on behalf of the anti-war protestors. His wife was a member of Another Mother for Peace.

=== Gay pride ===
In the late 1970s, Elrod came out as a gay man. After moving from Vancouver to Vancouver Island in 1990, he joined the Unitarian Church of Victoria, although not serving as a minister, and advocated for the congregation to be welcoming, initially to gays, subsequently to other diversities. He served on several national-level committees of the Canadian Unitarian Council (CUC), including as chair of the Equal Marriage Working Group. The president of the CUC reported in 2004, "Mac contributed an enormous amount of his time to this effort and without his generous financial support, and the pro bono work of our Counsel Robert J. Hughes and Kenneth W. Smith, the CUC could not have been one of 26 interveners who participated in the [2004] Canadian Supreme Court hearings [concerning same sex marriage]."

=== Drug policy reform ===
As chair of the Drug Policy Monitoring Group of the Canadian Unitarian Council, Elrod drafted and championed the CUC social responsibility resolution, "Alternatives to Drug Prohibition," adopted at the CUC AGM, Winnipeg, 2003.

== Miscellaneous ==
An enthusiastic patron of the arts, Elrod attended the Fats Waller musical revue, "Ain’t Misbehavin’" over 100 times during its Vancouver run in 1984-1985.

Canadian author and humorist Bill Richardson modelled the character "J. Macdonald Bellwether II" in his book, Bachelor Brothers' Bed and Breakfast after Elrod, describing him as "short-tempered, intolerant, and disinclined to suffer fools gladly."

Elrod appeared in 1990 comedy movie Short Time, playing the part of a minister officiating at a funeral.

== Memberships ==
- Member, American Library Association
- Founding member, BC Cataloguing and Technical Services (BCCATS) Interest Group.
- Founding member, Committee to Aid War Objectors (Vancouver)
- Founding member, Gay, Lesbian, Bisexual and Transgender Roundtable of the American Library Association
- Chair, Equal Marriage Working Group, Canadian Unitarian Council
- Chair, Racial and First Nations Equity Monitoring Group, Canadian Unitarian Council
- Chair, Drug Policy Monitoring Group, Canadian Unitarian Council
- Founding Member, Victoria (British Columbia) Multifaith Society
- Member, World Wide Unitarian Universalists

== Awards and honors ==
- Member, Phi Beta Kappa Society
- Carnegie Fellowship

== Partial bibliography ==
- Elrod, J. McRee, Guest Editorial: "The Case for Cataloguing Education," The Serials Librarian, Vol. 55, Nos. 1 & 2, 2009, 1–10.
- Elrod, J. McRee. "The Cataloging That Refreshes," American Libraries 37.11 (2006): 41-41.

Contributor, Conversations with Catalogers in the 21st Century, Elaine R. Sanchez, editor, 2011.

- Elrod, J. McRee. "Classification of Internet resources: an AUTOCAT discussion." Cataloging & Classification Quarterly 29.4 (2000): 19–38.
- Elrod, J. McRee. "Cataloguer's Role in Catalogue Construction-A Modest Proposal, The." Can. L. Libr. 22 (1997): 46.
- Elrod, J. McRee. "Chewing the Carpet over Costs." American Libraries 28.6 (1997): 49–50.
- Harris, Jessica L. "Modern library practices series: 2nd Edn. J. McRee Elrod, Scarecrow Press, Metuchen, NJ 1978, 5v. Contains: No. 1: Construction and Adaptation of the Unit Card, p. 72, $3.50. LC 77-17087. ISBN 0-8108-1090-5. No. 2: Filing in the Public Catalog and Shelf List, p. 81 (+ 164 cards), $10, LC77-13507. ISBN 0-8108-1337-8. NO. 3: Classification, p. 79, $3.50. LC77-1782. ISBN 0-8108-1094-8. No. 4: Choice of Main and Added Entries, p. 82, $3.50. LC77-1782. ISBN 0-8108-1095-6. No. 5: Choice of Subject Headings, p ...." (1979): 60–61.
- Elrod, J. McRee. "A practical compromise between the card catalogue and the inter-active on-line computerized catalogue for local and union catalogue purposes." Resource Sharing of Libraries in Developing Countries: Proceedings of the 1977 IFLA/UNESCO Pre-Session Seminar for Librarians from Developing Countries, Antwerp University, August 30-September 4, 1977. Vol. 14. Saur, 1979.
- Elrod, J. McRee. "Is the Card Catalogue's Unquestioned Sway in North America Ending?" Journal of Academic Librarianship 2.1 (1976): 4–8.
- Elrod, J. McRee, et al., An Index to the Library of Congress Classification: With Entries for Special Expansions in Medicine, Law, Canadiana, and nonbook materials, Canadian Library Association, 1974
- MacDonald, Robin W., and J. McRee Elrod. "An Approach to Developing Computer Catalogs." College and Research Libraries 34.3 (1973): 202–208.
- McRee Elrod, J. "Author and title analytics for major microform sets." Microform & Imaging Review 2.2 (1973): 99–104.
- Elrod, J. McRee. "Applying the Principle of Dealing with Exceptions." Library Resources and Technical Services (1972).
- Elrod, J. Mcree. "The two-language collection with the bilingual reader." International Cataloguing 1 (1972): 7.
- Elrod, J. McRee. An index to English language newspapers published in Korea, 1896–1937. Yonsei University, 1965.
- Elrod, J. McRee. Filing in the Library Public Catalog and Shelf List: A Programmed Unit. Ohio Wesleyan University Library, 1965.
- Elrod, J. McRee. "The Divided Catalog." Library Journal 87.9 (1962): 1728–1730
- Elrod, J. McRee. "The Classed Catalog in the Fifties," Library Resources and Technical Services, Vol. 3, No. 2, Spring, 1961.
- Elrod, J. McRee, "A Korean Classified Catalogue," Library Resources and Technical Services, Vol 4, No. 4, Fall 1960.
- Elrod, J. McRee. "Reorganizing a Korean library." Library Journal 84.20 (1959): 3522–3524.
- Elrod, J. McRee. An index to English language periodical literature published in Korea, 1890–1940. George Peabody College for Teachers, 1960.

=== Other publications ===
- "Why Not Stay Married," in Bi Men, Coming Out Every Which Way, Ron Jackson Suresha, Peter Chvany, eds., Binghamton, NY : Harrington Park Press, c2005.
- "The 'About Your Sexuality Kit'," in Liberating Minds: The Stories of Gay, Lesbian and Bisexual Librarians and their Advocates, Norman G. Kester, editor, McFarland c1997.
- Kline, Carl L.; Rider, Katherine; Berry, Karen; Elrod, J. McRee, "The young American expatriates in Canada: Alienated or self-defined?" American Journal of Orthopsychiatry, Vol 41(1), Jan 1971, 74–84.
- Elrod, J. McRee, "I Invited Negroes to My Home," The Atlantic, January, 1961, 67–68.
