= Scott Alden =

American lawyer (1907–1977)

Biographical details
- Born: 1907
- Died: December 12, 1977 (aged 70); Nashville, Tennessee, U.S.

Playing career

Football
- 1927: Tennessee
- Position: Guard

Coaching career (HC unless noted)

Football
- 1930–1932: Austin Peay

Basketball
- 1930–1933: Austin Peay

Baseball
- 1931–1932: Austin Peay

Head coaching record
- Overall: 9–8–5 (football); 24–17 (basketball); 6–7 (baseball)

Samuel Scott Alden (1907 – December 12, 1977) was an American special assistant to Federal Bureau of Investigation (FBI) Director J. Edgar Hoover, FBI special agent, director of the Tennessee Alcoholic Beverage Commission, lawyer, college professor, and a college sports coach. He was also a direct descendant of John Alden, a pilgrim who came to the United States on the Mayflower. Alden studied at the University of Tennessee where he played for coach Robert Neyland on their 1927 football team, but did not graduate from there. He instead enrolled in and graduated from Peabody College, then chose to pursue a law degree from Vanderbilt University Law School.

Alden spent 27 years in the FBI, he was either a special agent or a special agent in charge of offices in Miami, Savannah, Knoxville, Dallas, Little Rock, and Baltimore. When in charge of the Knoxville office, he was appointed as the first director of the state's Alcoholic Beverage Commission, a position he held for nine years (1963–1972).

In addition to Alden's government life, he served as the head coach for the football, basketball, and baseball teams at Austin Peay State University. He was one of the first coaches in all three sports at the school and finished with career head coaching records of 9–8–5 (football), 24–17 (basketball), and 6–7 (baseball). While at Austin Peay, Alden was also a professor of history.

== Head coaching record ==
=== Football ===
Year	Team	Overall	Conference	Standing	Bowl/playoffs
Austin Peay Governors (Independent) (1930–1932)
1930	Austin Peay	3–4–1			
1931	Austin Peay	3–2–2			
1932	Austin Peay	3–2–2			
Austin Peay:		9–8–5			
Total:		9–8–5			

=== Basketball ===
Record table
Season	Team	Overall	Conference	Standing	Postseason
Austin Peay Governors (Independent) (1930–1933)
1930–31	Austin Peay	9–7			
1931–32	Austin Peay	8–7			
1932–33	Austin Peay	7–3			
Austin Peay:		24–17 (.585)			
Total:		24–17 (.585)			

=== Baseball ===
Record table
Season	Team	Overall	Conference	Standing	Postseason
Austin Peay Governors (Independent) (1931–1932)
1931	Austin Peay	3–3			
1932	Austin Peay	3–4			
Austin Peay:		6–7 (.462)			
Total:		6–7 (.462)			
