= Mary Stuart MacMurphy =

American teacher, lecturer, and clubwoman (1846–1934)

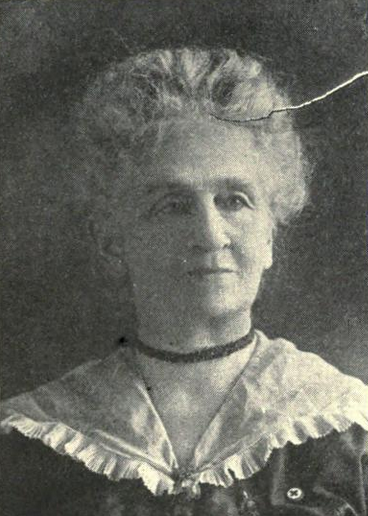
- Born: Mary L. Stuart James; September 1, 1846; Deerfield, New Hampshire, U.S.
- Died: January 31, 1934 (aged 87); Derry Village, New Hampshire, U.S.
- Resting place: Forest Hill Cemetery, East Derry, New Hampshire, U.S.
- Education: Pinkerton Academy; Vassar College; University of Chicago
- Occupations: Teacher, lecturer, clubwoman, author, translator
- Spouse: Jesse Gibson MacMurphy (m. 1870)
- Children: 3

Mary Stuart MacMurphy (née James; after marriage, MacMurphy or McMurphy; September 1, 1846 – January 31, 1934) was an American teacher, lecturer, clubwoman, and author from New Hampshire. She was the author of Only Glimpses (1887) and Ferns of Wisconsin. She held positions at Albany Female Academy, Robinson Female Seminary, College Preparatory School, and Waller High School.

== Early life and education ==
Mary L. Stuart James was born in Deerfield, New Hampshire on September 1, 1846, the daughter of Capt. Joseph Warren James and his wife, Harriet Neeley (née Hoyt or Hoitt) James.

MacMurphy received her education at the Pinkerton Academy, Derry, New Hampshire. She completed the first course at the Salem, Massachusetts Normal School, 1864; and the advanced course, 1866. She then attended Mlle. Tribou's Academy, Paris, France. MacMurphy also did special studies at Vassar College and the University of Chicago.

== Career ==
In the autumn of 1866, MacMurphy became head of the Senior department of the Albany Female Academy, a position she held for several years. Later, at the request of Eben S. Stearns, Principal, she accepted the position of preceptress at Robinson Female Seminary.

On April 22, 1870, (Note: According to Leonard (1914), the wedding took place in Derry, New Hampshire, 1869.) she married Rev. Jesse Gibson MacMurphy (1845-1938), and became a resident of Racine, Wisconsin. Their children were Sarah Russell, James Alexander, and Jerome Case.

In Racine, she soon became principal of the College Preparatory School, a position she held for 15 years. She was also a lecturer at the Avon Art Club. In 1895, she was called to Chicago as head of the history department in the Waller High School, remaining until 1911. She was interested in art work at the Art Institute of Chicago. She was the author of Only Glimpses and Ferns of Wisconsin. She also engaged in French translations.

MacMurphy was a member of the Woman's Club and Avon Art Club, Racine (president of the former 1894–96; director of the latter, 1879–94). She was a member of the Chicago and Oak Park Woman's Clubs and the Glaux Syntelia, Chicago. MacMurphy was a lecturer to the Sesame Circle, Oak Park, Illinois, four years; and a leader of the Culture Club, North Chicago, four years. She was a member of and active worker in the Daughters of the American Revolution, the Derry Woman's Club, and the American Red Cross. She served as chair of the Art Department, New Hampshire Federation of Women's Clubs, 1915–17.

== Personal life ==
In 1911, she returned to New England, engaging in foreign travel and close study. By 1919, MacMurphy was residing in Derry Village, New Hampshire, where she died at her home on January 31, 1934, aged 87. She was interred at Forest Hill Cemetery in East Derry.

== Selected works ==
Only glimpses

- Only Glimpses (1887) (text, via Internet Archive)
- Ferns of Wisconsin
