= Patrice Engle =

Developmental psychologist

- Born: December 1, 1944
- Died: September 22, 2012 (aged 67)
- Occupation: Professor of Psychology
- Awards: SRCD Distinguished International Contributions to Child Development (2011)

Academic background
- Education: Wellesley College; Stanford University

Academic work
- Institutions: California Polytechnic State University, San Luis Obispo; UNICEF

Patrice Lee Engle (December 1, 1944 – September 22, 2012) was a developmental psychologist known as a pioneer in the field of global early childhood development and for her international work advocating for children's education and healthcare. She was Professor of Psychology and Child Development at California Polytechnic State University, San Luis Obispo.

Engle was senior advisor for early childhood development for the United Nations Children's Educational Fund (UNICEF) and founder of the Global Child Development Group. Engle introduced the concept of the development quotient, a numerical indicator of a child's growth across a range of psychosocial competencies, as a critical measure for international studies of child development trajectories.

== Awards ==
Engle received the Distinguished International Contributions to Child Development Award from the Society for Research in Child Development (SRCD) in 2011. In her honor, the SRCD awards the Patrice L. Engle Dissertation Grant annually to doctoral students interested in careers in global early child development and who are from or doing research in low- or middle-income countries.

Engle was an Honorary Professor at the University of Hong Kong.

== Biography ==
Patricia Lee Engle was born in Philadelphia, Pennsylvania, on December 1, 1944. She had two siblings: a twin sister, Sally Engle Merry, and an older brother, Robert Fry Engle lll.

Engle attended Wellesley College, where she completed her undergraduate degree in psychology. She subsequently completed a PhD in Child Development at Stanford University. After graduating, she spent two years at the University of Illinois at Chicago before moving to Guatemala to work at the Institute of Nutrition of Central America and Panama for four years. With support from a Fulbright Research Scholarship, Engle studied in Guatemala the impact of maternal work and child care arrangements on their children's growth. Other work focusing on orphans and vulnerable children in sub-Saharan Africa was funded by the Bernard van Leer Foundation. She helped to spearhead two Lancet Series of on early child development In 2007 and 2011.

Engle worked at California Polytechnic State University for much of her career. She spent two years in India working as the chief of child development and nutrition for UNICEF and held the title of senior advisor for UNICEF for seven years. Other projects led her to spend a year in Geneva, Switzerland working for the World Health Organization and a year at the International Food Policy Research Institute in Washington, DC.

Engle studied women empowerment and observed fathers' effect on their child's development, and the spread of HIV and AIDS at its peak. She additionally studied child development and health. Engle's work was conducted on an international national scale. She increased understanding and provided strategies to address child poverty and related health issues. She spread awareness by personally traveling and assisting researchers and also participating in conducted research by writing books on these issues.

Engle died of lung cancer in New York City on September 22, 2012.

== Books ==
- Britto, P. R., Engle, P. L., & Super, C. M. (Eds.). (2013). Handbook of early childhood development research and its impact on global policy. Oxford University Press.
- Pollitt, E., Gorman, K. S., Engle, P. L., Martorell, R., Rivera, J., Wachs, T. D., & Scrimshaw, N. S. (1993). Early supplementary feeding and cognition: Effects over two decades. Monographs of the Society for Research in Child Development, 58(7), i-118.

== Representative publications ==
- Engle, P. L. (1991). Maternal work and child‐care strategies in peri‐urban Guatemala: Nutritional effects. Child Development, 62(5), 954–965.
- Engle, P. L. (1997). The role of men in families: Achieving gender equity and supporting children. Gender & Development, 5(2), 31–40.
- Engle, P. L., & Black, M. M. (2008). The effect of poverty on child development and educational outcomes. Annals of the New York Academy of Sciences, 1136, 243–256.
- Engle, P. L., Black, M. M., Behrman, J. R., De Mello, M. C., Gertler, P. J., Kapiriri, L., ... & International Child Development Steering Group. (2007). Strategies to avoid the loss of developmental potential in more than 200 million children in the developing world. The Lancet, 369(9557), 229–242.
- Engle, P. L., Fernald, L. C., Alderman, H., Behrman, J., O'Gara, C., Yousafzai, A., ... & Iltus, S. (2011). Strategies for reducing inequalities and improving developmental outcomes for young children in low-income and middle-income countries. The Lancet, 378(9799), 1339–1353.
- Engle, P. L., Menon, P., & Haddad, L. (1999). Care and nutrition: concepts and measurement. World Development, 27(8), 1309–1337.
