= Alfred Baumeister =

American psychologist

Alfred A. Baumeister
- Born: July 25, 1934; Fairbanks, Alaska
- Died: March 14, 2011 (aged 76); Tuscaloosa, Alabama
- Education: Peabody College
- Known for: Research on intellectual disabilities
- Awards: Edgar A. Doll Award for Research in Mental Retardation from the Division on Mental Retardation of the American Psychological Association (1991)
- Scientific career
- Fields: Psychology
- Institutions: Peabody College
- Thesis: The Dimensions of Abilities in Retardates as Measured by the Wechsler Intelligence Scale for Children (1961)

Alfred A. Baumeister (July 25, 1934 – March 14, 2011) was an American psychologist and professor at Vanderbilt University, known for his research on intellectual disabilities and his advocacy for such research.

== Biography ==
Baumeister was born in Fairbanks, Alaska, on July 25, 1934. He received his master's degree in 1959 and his Ph.D. in 1961, both from the Peabody College at Vanderbilt University. He joined the faculty at Peabody College in 1961 as an assistant professor of psychology. He taught at Central Michigan University from 1961 to 1965 and at the University of Alabama from 1967 to 1973. In 1973, he rejoined Peabody College as a professor and director of the Institute on Mental Retardation and Intellectual Development. From 1983 to 1990, he was the director of Vanderbilt's John F. Kennedy Center for Research on Education and Human Development. After stepping down as director of the Kennedy Center in 1990, he remained on the Vanderbilt faculty until his retirement in 2000. He died in Tuscaloosa, Alabama on March 14, 2011.
