= J. M. Lelen =

J. M. Lelen was French American priest and author, translator, poet, and philosopher who corresponded with many notable figures in his lifetime.

== Early life ==
He was born Joseph Leleu at Sailly, France December 24, 1873. His family moved to Lille soon after. While growing up in Lille he met Thérèse of Lisieux who had come to Lille on a visit with her family. They were both the same age (seven) at the time. Joseph Lelen, a French citizen, served in the French Army until 1894, together with author Hilaire Belloc, then a friend.

== Commitment to religious life ==
He joined the Sulpician Order and became a Roman Catholic priest upon ordination at Notre Dame Cathedral of Paris on September 24, 1898.

Father Lelen came to America in 1899, after working in France with the Sulpicians. He taught at Dunwoodie Seminary in Yonkers, New York. Later he traveled to France, then returned to North America serving in Canada and eventually New Orleans. The climate in New Orleans did not agree with Fr. Lelen and he requested and was granted assignment in Covington, Kentucky in 1907.

His first assignment was as chaplain of Good Shepherd Convent in Fort Thomas, Kentucky. He became editor of "The Christian Year" the diocesan newspaper of the Roman Catholic Diocese of Covington in January 1912. He then served as pastor of St. Paul parish, Florence, Kentucky from 1915 to 1918.

Father Lelen became pastor of St. Francis Xavier Church in Falmouth, Kentucky in 1918. He continued to write many books, pamphlets, magazine articles and newspaper articles. He was a regular contributor to The Falmouth Outlook, the weekly paper of Falmouth, Kentucky. He continued in this pastorate until he retired in 1954.

== Author and correspondent ==
In 1952 his translation "The Confessions of St. Augustine", from the original Latin, was published in English, one of the first in this language.

He was a prolific author of prayer books throughout his life. He corresponded with and met many notable figures, including Margaret Mitchell, Alice Brown, William Dean Howells, Mark Twain, Jules Verne and Clare Boothe Luce.

Upon his 1954 retirement he lived at the Glenmary Missionaries in Cincinnati. In September, 1963 the Papal Cross (Pro Ecclesia et Pontifice) bestowed by Pope Paul VI was granted to Father Lelen on the occasion of his 65th anniversary of his ordination. "The Cross of Honor" as it is known is bestowed upon laypersons and clergy who have given exceptional service to the Church. The medal hangs upon a gold and white ribbon.

He died in Cincinnati, Ohio on May 23, 1964.

== Books written and edited by Father Lelen ==
- Jesus My Love An Ideal Prayerbook (1938)
- Towards the Altar (1908)
- Towards the Sanctuary (1908)
- The Duty of Happiness, Thoughts on Hope, Newport KY: Good Shepherd Press, (1911)
- The Gospel of Pain, Covington KY: 1st ed. 62p (1912)
- Pray the Rosary, Catholic Book Pub Co, ISBN 978-0-89942-048-6
- The Agony of Our Lord (1920)
- The Friend of Sinners, Burns Oats & Washbourne (1930)
- Mysterium Amoris, and Other Eucharistic Sketches, Paterson NJ: St. Anthony Guild Press, (1934)
- Toward the Eternal Priesthood, St Anthony Guild Press (1938)
- Soldiers and Sailors Prayer Book: Daily Devotions, Catholic Book Publishing Co., United States and Canada (1940)
- The Following of Christ, by Thomas à Kempis, (J. M. Lelen, Editor) Catholic Book Publishing, New York (1941)
- Key of Heaven, a Prayer Book for Catholics, New York, New York: Catholic Book Publishing Co. (1942)
- La Imitación de Cristo, by Thomas Kempis, Editado por el Reverendo J.M. Lelen, Ph.D. Catholic Book Publishing Co. (1943) Traducción Nueva con consideraciones al de cada capítulo.
- Rezai Sempre, Catholic Book Pub. Co. (1949)
- Confessions Of Saint Augustine (1953)
- Pray the Rosary, by Father J M Lelen, PhD; Catholic Book Publishing Company, New York, New York, USA (1953)
- Child of God, Catholic Book Publishing Co. (1958)
- Key of Heaven : A Complete Manual of Prayers and Catholic Devotions, Catholic Book Publishing (1958)
- The Treasury of the Sacred Heart, Catholic Book Publishing Co., New York, NY (1960)
- Ave Maria, a Manual of Catholic Devotions, New York, New York: Catholic Book Publishing Co. (1960)
- The Gospel of a County Pastor: Sketches and Sermons, Herder, St Louis, Mo. (1961)
- Our Lady of Fatima Manual, Catholic Book Pub. Co (1962)
- Illustrated Life of Christ, Catholic Book Publishing Company (1964)
- Pray the Rosary for Novenas, Family Rosary, Private Recitation, Five First Sundays, Catholic Book Publishing, New York, NY (1973)
- Confessions Of Saint Augustine: Revision Of The Translation Of Rev. J.M. Lelen (paraclete Living Library) ISBN 0-89942-169-5
