= Alice Brown (writer) =

American novelist, poet and playwright

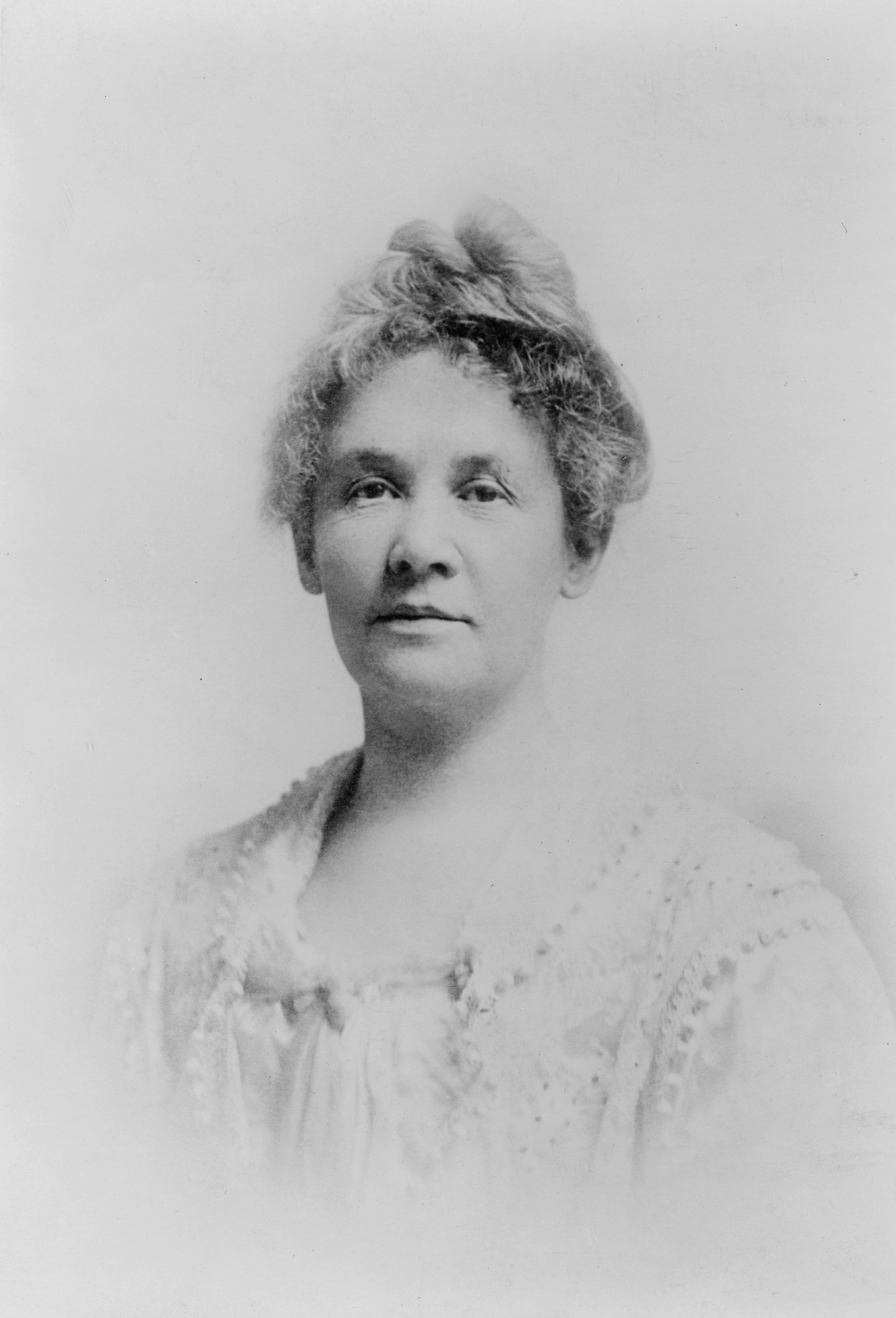
- Born: Hampton Falls, New Hampshire, United States
- Died: June 21, 1948 (aged 90); Boston, Massachusetts, United States
- Education: Robinson Female Seminary
- Occupations: Novelist; poet; playwright
- Writing career
- Language: English
- Years active: 1884–1935
- Genre: Fiction
- Movement: American literary regionalism

Alice Brown (December 5, 1857 – June 21, 1948) was an American novelist, poet and playwright, best known as a writer of local color stories. She also contributed a chapter to the collaborative novel, The Whole Family (1908).

== Biography ==
She was born in Hampton Falls, New Hampshire and graduated from Robinson Female Seminary in Exeter in 1876. She later worked as a school teacher for five years, but moved to Boston to write full-time in 1884. She first worked at the Christian Register and then, starting in 1885, the Youth's Companion.

Brown is believed to have had a long-term relationship with Louise Imogen Guiney and wrote of their travels together in her book By Oak and Thorn (1897) and later wrote the biography Louise Imogen Guiney — a Study (1921).

Brown was a prolific author for many years, but her popularity waned after the turn of the 20th century. She produced a book a year until she stopped writing in 1935. She corresponded with Rev. Michael Earls of the College of the Holy Cross and with Father J. M. Lelen of Falmouth, Kentucky, with whom she also exchanged poems. Yale University and Holy Cross now have the only sizable collections of her letters, since she ordered that most of her personal correspondence should be destroyed after her death. Brown died in Boston, Massachusetts in 1948.

== Works ==
- Fools of Nature (1887) novel
- Sunrise on Mansfield Mountain (1895) (Harper's New Monthly Magazine Oct 1895)
- Meadow-Grass: Tales of New England Life (1896) stories
- The Rose of Hope (1896)
- Mercy Warren (1896)
- The Day of His Youth (1897) novel
- By Oak and Thorn (1897) travelog
- Tiverton Tales (1899) stories
- Kings End (1901) novel
- Margaret Warrener (1901) novel
- The Mannerings (1903) novel
- High Noon (1904) stories
- Paradise (1905) novel
- The Country Road (1906) stories
- Rose MacLeod (1908) novel
- The Whole Family (1908, collaborative novel)
- The Story of Thyza (1909) novel
- John Winterbourne's Family (1910) novel
- Country Neighbors (1910) stories
- Golden Baby (1910)
  In 2009, The Library of America selected this story for inclusion in its two-century retrospective of American Fantastic Tales, edited by Peter Straub.
- The One-Footed Fairy (1911) stories
- The Secret of the Clan (1912)
- My Love and I (1912) novel
- Robin Hood's Barn (1913)
- Vanishing Points (1913) stories
- Joint Owners in Spain (1914)
- Children of Earth (1915) play
- Bromley Neighborhood (1917) novel
- The Prisoner (1916) novel
- The Flying Teuton (1918) stories
- The Black Drop (1919) novel
- Homespun and Gold (1920) stories
- The Wind Between the Worlds (1920) novel
- One-Act Plays (1921)
- Louise Imogen Guiney — a Study (1921) biography
- Old Crow (1922) novel
- Ellen Prior, (1923) verse
- Dear Old Templeton (1927) novel
- The Diary of a Dryad (1932) novel
- The Kingdom in the Sky (1932) novel
- Jeremy Hamlin (1934) novel
- The Willoughbys (1935) novel

[Those titles not classified are individual short stories.]

Another book by Alice Brown is The Patient Sufferer, A Story For Youth. It was written for the American Sunday-School Union, and revised by the Committee of Publication. Also noted on title page: Philadelphia: American Sunday-School Union, No. 146 Chestnut Street. This book also has a sketch on the preceding page with the title "Where Alice Brown lived".
