= Tommie Morton-Young =

Historian and activist

- Education: Tennessee State University; George Peabody College for Teachers; Duke University
- Occupations: Librarian, professor, historian

Tommie Morton-Young is an educator, activist, author, and historian. After becoming the first African-American to graduate from George Peabody College for Teachers, she went on to work as a librarian and professor in both education and library science. Her human rights activism and work preserving African American history has earned her recognition by a number of organizations in Tennessee.

== Education and career as educator ==
A native of Nashville, Tennessee, Morton-Young attended public schools and earned her undergraduate degree cum laude from Tennessee State University. She was the first African American to graduate from George Peabody College for Teachers (later Peabody College of Vanderbilt University), earning her Master of Library Science in 1955. She completed a Ph.D. in social psychology from Duke University in 1977.

Morton-Young has worked at a number of government and higher education organizations, including researching for the U.S. Navy Library and transliterating Russian at the Library of Congress. She worked as an administrator and a professor of education and library and information science at a number of universities, including Atlanta University, Tennessee State University, the University of Wisconsin, North Carolina State University, North Carolina Central University and North Carolina A&T State University. She retired as a full professor from the University of North Carolina system.

== Activism and advocacy work ==
In 1979 Morton-Young founded the North Carolina African American Genealogical and Historical Society; she founded the Tennessee African American Genealogical and Historical Society in 1994. She served as director of the NAACP's Parent Education/Child Advocacy Project. Morton-Young co-chaired the Greensboro Coalition for Unity & Justice, a group of community activists that held demonstrations against the Ku Klux Klan in 1987.

As chairperson of the North Carolina Advisory Committee to the U.S. Commission on Civil Rights, she initiated hearings on pay equity for women and minorities and school placement of students. During her twenty years on that committee she also contributed to a United States Department of Labor study on migrant workers.

Morton-Young has written books on a variety of subjects, including on works on after-school activities for at-risk children, Tennessee history, and African-American history and genealogy. One of her most notable books is the 1987 Afro-American genealogy sourcebook, an early work in African-American genealogy. She is the owner and operator of a tour company that focuses on the African-American history of Nashville.

== Recognition and awards ==
Morton-Young was recognized for her human rights activism in 2010 by the Nashville Cordell Hull Chapter of the United Nations Association of the United States of America.

She received the Peabody College Distinguished Alumna Award in 2010; Peabody Dean of Education Camilla Benbow praised her for using "her education to strengthen the lives of children, families and communities, especially those who too often are marginalized".

In 2013 the Tennessee Human Rights Commission honored her advancement of human and civil rights "through her career as an educator, through activism and her preservation of African American genealogy". Other recognition includes a 2006 Athena Award from Nashville CABLE (commending professional women), the 2010 Legacy Award from the Scarritt Bennett Center for efforts in eradicating racism, and the Tennessee Achievement Award (from Governor Don Sundquist).

The Dr. Tommie Morton Young Award is awarded each year to a Vanderbilt University student who demonstrates dedication to community service.
