= Dudley Dudley (politician) =

American political activist (born 1936)

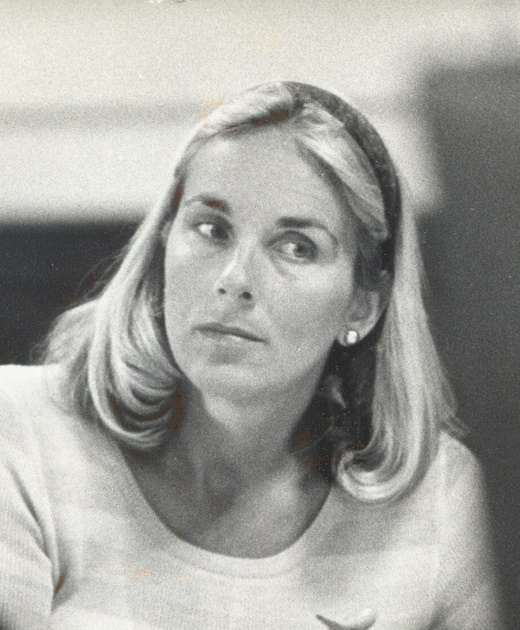
- Dudley at an Executive Council meeting (1970s)

Member of the New Hampshire Executive Council from the 3rd district
- In office 1977–1985
- Preceded by: Leon Yeaton
- Succeeded by: William Cahill

Personal details
- Born: Dudley Webster; August 4, 1936 (age 90) Exeter, New Hampshire, U.S.
- Party: Democratic
- Spouse: Thomas Minot Dudley (m. 1956; died 2013)
- Children: 2
- Education: University of New Hampshire

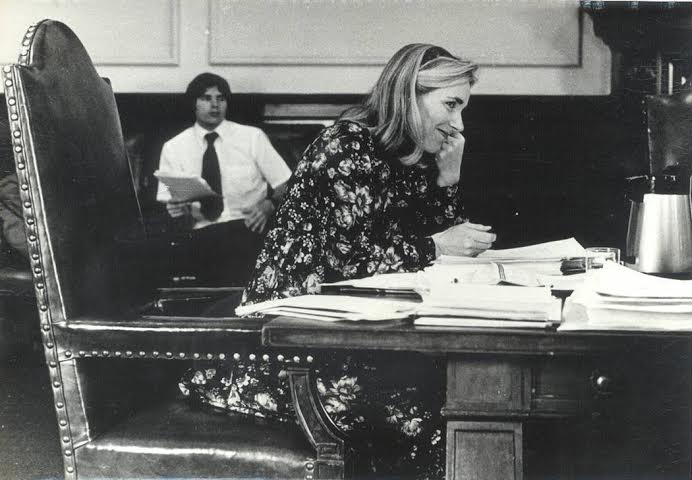
Dudley at NH Executive Council meeting (1970s)

Dudley Dudley (née Webster; born August 4, 1936) is an American political activist, known for her 1974 legislation that helped prevent shipping magnate Aristotle Onassis from building an oil pipeline on the Isles of Shoals and a refinery near Durham, New Hampshire. In 1976, Dudley became the first woman elected to the New Hampshire Executive Council, where she served four consecutive terms. In 1984, she won the Democratic primary to represent New Hampshire's First Congressional District.

== Early life and career ==
Born in Exeter, New Hampshire, Dudley Webster was raised in the nearby town of Durham, where she has lived most of her life. She attended Durham Center School, the Robinson Female Seminary in Exeter, and studied art at the University of New Hampshire. When she married Portsmouth attorney Thomas Minot Dudley, taking his last name of Dudley, her name became both a political asset and the source of humor throughout her career. Dudley and her husband have two daughters, whom they raised in Durham.

Dudley became involved in the civil rights movement in the 1960s, and, in 1969, she and Tom protested the incarceration of two black Marines who spoke out against the Vietnam War. William Harvey and George Daniels were sentenced to six and 10 years of hard labor, respectively, for telling other black servicemen that they should not engage in a “white man’s war” when they weren't being treated as equals in their own country. The Dudleys sailed back and forth in front of the Portsmouth Naval Prison with a sign that read "Free Harvey and Daniels" until the soldiers were finally released.

Dudley was a delegate to the 1972 Democratic National Convention for George McGovern, working for him in the presidential primary race in New Hampshire. In 1974, Congressman Morris Udall came to Bedford, New Hampshire, to announce his run for the Democratic presidential nomination. Dudley became First District Coordinator for Udall's campaign, during which she hosted much of the campaign staff, including the candidate's son Mark, who lived with the family during the New Hampshire primary race. All the while, Dudley was pursuing a career of her own.

From 1972 to 1976, Dudley served in the New Hampshire House of Representatives. She was believed to be the first Democratic legislator from Durham in nearly fifty years. About halfway through her first term, an unexpected and environmentally significant change was proposed that would have altered Dudley's hometown and the entire seacoast of New Hampshire: the construction of an oil refinery, which would have been one of the largest in the world.

== Opposition to Onassis oil refinery plans ==
In 1974, Greek shipping magnate Aristotle Onassis announced plans to build a 400,000-barrel-a-day oil refinery on Great Bay in Durham. (Even today, there are only a few dozen larger refineries in operation.) In an effort to save her New England hometown from becoming a site for crude oil refining, Dudley helped rally thousands of local community members and delivered a petition that was created by the citizen group Save Our Shores (SOS). When she arrived at his office, then-Governor Meldrim Thomson ordered her out of his office, whereupon she unrolled the petition on the steps of the New Hampshire State House for a widely published news photograph.

It was a vicious battle, but Dudley eventually proposed legislation that convinced a special session of the state legislature to approve Home Rule Bill HB 18, giving Durham residents the right to veto the oil refinery. This legislation prevented 3,500 acres (1,400 ha) along the shore of Great Bay from becoming a six-hundred-million dollar refinery and earned Dudley a national reputation as an environmental activist.

The screenplay Oil and Water depicts the battle between Aristotle Onassis and Dudley. Written by Alfred Thomas Catalfo and Morgan Webster Dudley (Dudley's daughter), the script won the 2015 Nashville Film Festival Screenwriting Competition and placed as a finalist (top 0.5%) in the 2015 Script Pipeline Screenwriting Competition.

== Later political career ==
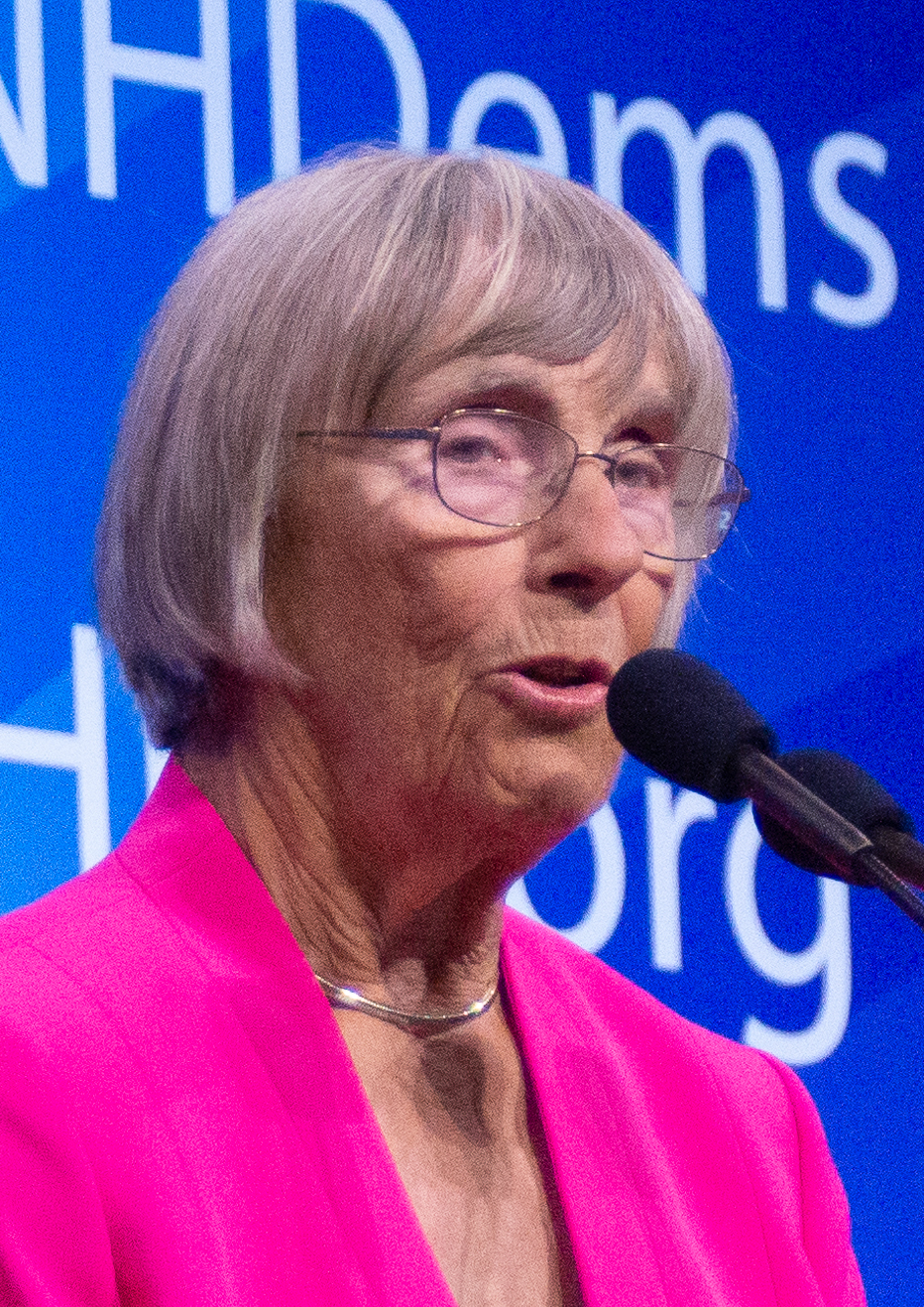
Dudley Dudley in 2019.

Following the oil refinery battle, Dudley was elected to the Executive Council of New Hampshire from the 3rd district, where she served from 1976 to 1984. At that time she was the first woman to serve in an office higher than Legislature, making her the highest politically ranked woman in the state.

In 1980, along with Joanne Simons, Dudley spearheaded the Draft Kennedy campaign, urging Senator Edward Kennedy to run for President. In addition to leading the Kennedy campaign, she has worked on the presidential campaigns of Eugene McCarthy, George McGovern, Mo Udall, Paul Tsongas, Bill Bradley, Wesley Clark, Barack Obama, Bernie Sanders and, most recently, Tom Steyer.

In 1984, Dudley won the Democratic nomination for the First Congressional District, and was defeated by Republican Bob Smith. Dudley's campaign slogan made a play on her name: "Dudley Dudley: Congress Congress", echoing slogans from her reelection campaigns for the executive council, "Dudley Dudley, Worth Repeating". That rebounded when Smith, a staunch conservative, coined his own catchphrase: "Dudley Dudley, Liberal Liberal".

From 1987 to 1998, Dudley was executive director of the Women Legislators' Lobby, a national organization of female state legislators who worked with their members of Congress to reduce the federal budget appropriation for military weapons.

Dudley is a past overseer of Dartmouth Medical School and past director of the NH Civil Liberties Union. She has served on the boards of the Ella Lyman Cabot Trust, the Greater Piscataqua Community Foundation, and RAIN for the Sahel and the Sahara.

Dudley has been a trustee of the University of New Hampshire and a director for the UNH Alumni Association board. She worked with a group of UNH students to reunite a Congolese family separated when the parents had to flee the country and leave their children behind.

Dudley received the Eleanor Roosevelt Award at the New Hampshire Democratic Party's annual Jefferson Jackson Dinner on November 16, 2013, where she was commended by state Democratic Party Chairman Ray Buckley for being an outstanding role model for young women looking to make a positive impact in their communities. Each year, the Eleanor Roosevelt Award is presented to a Granite State Democrat who has shown extraordinary commitment to the values of social and economic justice.

In 2016, Dudley was an elector in the Electoral College, casting one of New Hampshire's four electoral votes for Hillary Clinton.

Also in 2016, Dudley's portrait was commissioned to be hung in the Governor's Council Chambers at the New Hampshire State House in Concord.
