= Preston Lang Bethea =

American politician

Preston Lang Bethea (April 10, 1870 – April 15, 1944) was an American farmer and politician.

Born near Dillon, South Carolina, Bethea went to Wofford College in 1887 and 1888. He then graduated from Peabody College in 1891. Bethea was a farmer near Clio, South Carolina. He served in the South Carolina House of Representatives from 1911 to 1914. Bethea then served in the South Carolina State Senate from 1919 to 1923. He was an educator and lay preacher in the Methodist church. He was married to Josephine Weatherly of Marlborough County. They had two children, Weatherly Bethea (m Margaret Gailliard) and Mary MacLeod Bethea (m. Dr. Benjamin Franklin Hardy). He died at his home, Sunset Knoll, in Dillon County, South Carolina, after a long illness. His grandchildren were Elizabeth Bethea (m. Russell Long), Benjamin Franklin Hardy Jr. (m Jacqueline Allen), Preston Bethea Hardy (m. Mary Rogers), and Clifford Hensley Hardy (m. Louise Crosland).
