= John Edwin Windrow =

American educator (1899–1984)

- Born: September 26, 1899; Eagleville, Tennessee, U.S.
- Died: May 26, 1984 (aged 84); Nashville, Tennessee, U.S.
- Education: Middle Tennessee State University; Peabody College
- Occupation: Educator
- Employer: Peabody College
- Spouse: Elizabeth Grigsby
- Children: 1 daughter

John Edwin Windrow (September 26, 1899 – May 26, 1984) was an American educator. He became known as "Mr. Peabody" for his five-decade career at Peabody College in Nashville, Tennessee. He was a critic of Nashville's social ills and intellectual segregation.

== Early life ==
Windrow was born on September 26, 1899, in Eagleville, Tennessee, to John C. Windrow and Sarah Glenn. He graduated from Middle Tennessee State University, and he earned a PhD from Peabody College in 1937.

== Career ==
Windrow first taught in Clarksville and Tullahoma. He spent the rest of his career at Peabody College: first as the secretary of its alumni association in 1925, and later as "director of the Peabody Demonstration School, editor of the alumni magazine, acting chairman of the Department of Education and director of the Division of Public Services." He was the college historian and archivist from 1974 to 1984.

Windrow was opposed to "any emphasis on research at the cost of teaching, and the new trend toward corporation- or government-sponsored research." He was a staunch critic of Peabody's merger with Vanderbilt University, effective in 1979.

Windrow was awarded the honorary title of "ambassador extraordinary" by Peabody's board of trustees in 1972. He became the namesake of a Peabody scholarship with an endowment of $500,000 in 1982.

Windrow authored a book about John Berrien Lindsley, an Antebellum educator who served as the chancellor of the University of Nashville. In a review for The Journal of Southern History, Transylvania University professor F. Garvin Davenport suggested the book was "poorly organized" and he deplored the "lack of careful proof-reading", but he admitted that "certain sections of the study are interesting and informative." Windrow also edited a collection of essays authored by Alfred Leland Crabb, a Peabody professor and novelist. Reviewing it for the Tennessee Historical Quarterly, Professor Robert A. McGaw of Vanderbilt University explained that Windrow started the book with a 22-page introduction about Crabb and Peabody's history, followed by Crabb's essays, including one about William Walker.

== Views on Nashville ==
In 1945, Windrow criticized Nashville's elite for ignoring the city's many ills, including:

the smoke smoldering the city skyline, the "civil lethargy" represented by voter apathy; the "staggering death rate" of tuberculosis victims, and assorted social ills such as high venereal disease rates, infestation of flea-ridden rats, inadequate garbage collection, juvenile delinquency, and poor housing, sanitation, and sewage.

— Benjamin Houston, The Nashville Way

== Views on I.Q. tests ==
In a 1965 article for the Peabody Reflector, Windrow argued that intellectual segregation based on IQ tests was un-American. Instead, he argued that schools should give students a chance to develop by studying together regardless of test scores and rankings. He emphasized,

They (forces pushing the testing too strongly) ought to know that no free society was ever built on the stratification of its people socially, economically or intellectually.

— J. E. Windrow, The Peabody Reflector, quoted in The Tennessean

== Personal life and death ==
Windrow married Elizabeth Grigsby. They had a daughter.

Windrow died on May 26, 1984, in Nashville, Tennessee.

== Selected works ==
- Windrow, John Edwin (1938). John Berrien Lindsley: Educator, Physician, Social Philosopher. Chapel Hill, North Carolina: University of North Carolina Press. OCLC 776680222.
- Crabb, Alfred Leland (1977). Windrow, John Edwin (ed.). Peabody and Alfred Leland Crabb: The Story of Peabody as Reflected in Selected Writings of Alfred Leland Crabb. Nashville, Tennessee: Williams Press. OCLC 3670975.
