= Eben S. Stearns =

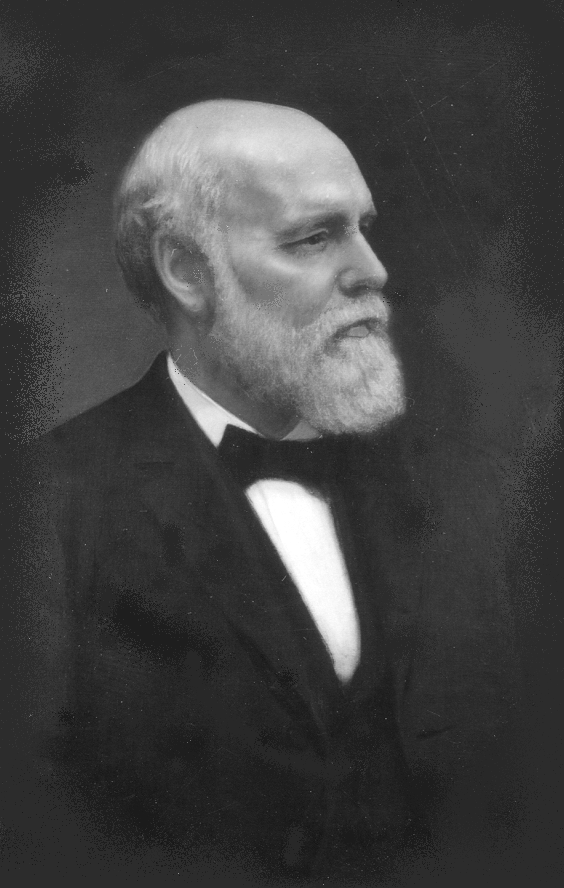
- Born: December 23, 1819; Bedford, Massachusetts, U.S.
- Died: April 11, 1887 (aged 67); Nashville, Tennessee, U.S.
- Education: Harvard University
- Occupation: Educator

Eben S. Stearns (1819–1887) was an American educator. He served as the President of Framingham State University from 1849 to 1855, and as the Chancellor of the University of Nashville and President of Peabody Normal School (which later merged with Vanderbilt University) from 1875 to 1887.

== Early life ==
Eben Sperry Stearns was born on December 23, 1819, in Bedford, Massachusetts. His father was a Congregational minister.

Stearns enrolled at Harvard University in 1841, where he received a master of arts degree in 1845. He received a Doctor of Divinity and a Doctor of Laws from other universities.

== Career ==
Stearns began his career as a teacher in an all girls' seminary in Ipswich, Massachusetts. He went on to teach in West Newton, Newburyport, Massachusetts, and Portland, Maine.

Stearns served as the President of Framingham State University from 1849 to 1855.

Stearns served as the Chancellor of the University of Nashville and President of the Peabody Normal School from 1875 to 1887. Under his leadership, the school attendance grew from 13 to 179 students. In 1885, he authored Historical Sketch of the Normal College, at Nashville, Tennessee.

== Personal life ==
Stearns was married, and he had children.

== Death and legacy ==
Stearns died on April 11, 1887, in Nashville, Tennessee. His funeral was held by an Episcopal pastor in Nashville, and he was buried in Bedford, Massachusetts.

Meanwhile, he was replaced as Chancellor of the University of Nashville and President of the Peabody Normal School by William H. Payne. A year after his death, in 1888, his portrait by Geo Drury was donated to the Peabody Normal College.
