= Vanderbilt Peabody College of Education and Human Development =

Education school of Vanderbilt University in Nashville, Tennessee

- Other names: Vanderbilt Peabody College, Peabody College
- Former names: George Peabody College for Teachers, Peabody Normal College
- Type: Private education school
- Established: 1875; 151 years ago
- Parent institution: Vanderbilt University
- Dean: Camilla Benbow
- Faculty: 179
- Students: 2,884 (2022)
- Undergraduates: 1,433 (2022)
- Postgraduates: 1,254 MEd, MPP, EdD (2022); 192 PhD (2022)
- Location: Nashville, Tennessee, U.S.
- Website: peabody.vanderbilt.edu

- George Peabody College for Teachers
- U.S. National Register of Historic Places
- U.S. National Historic Landmark
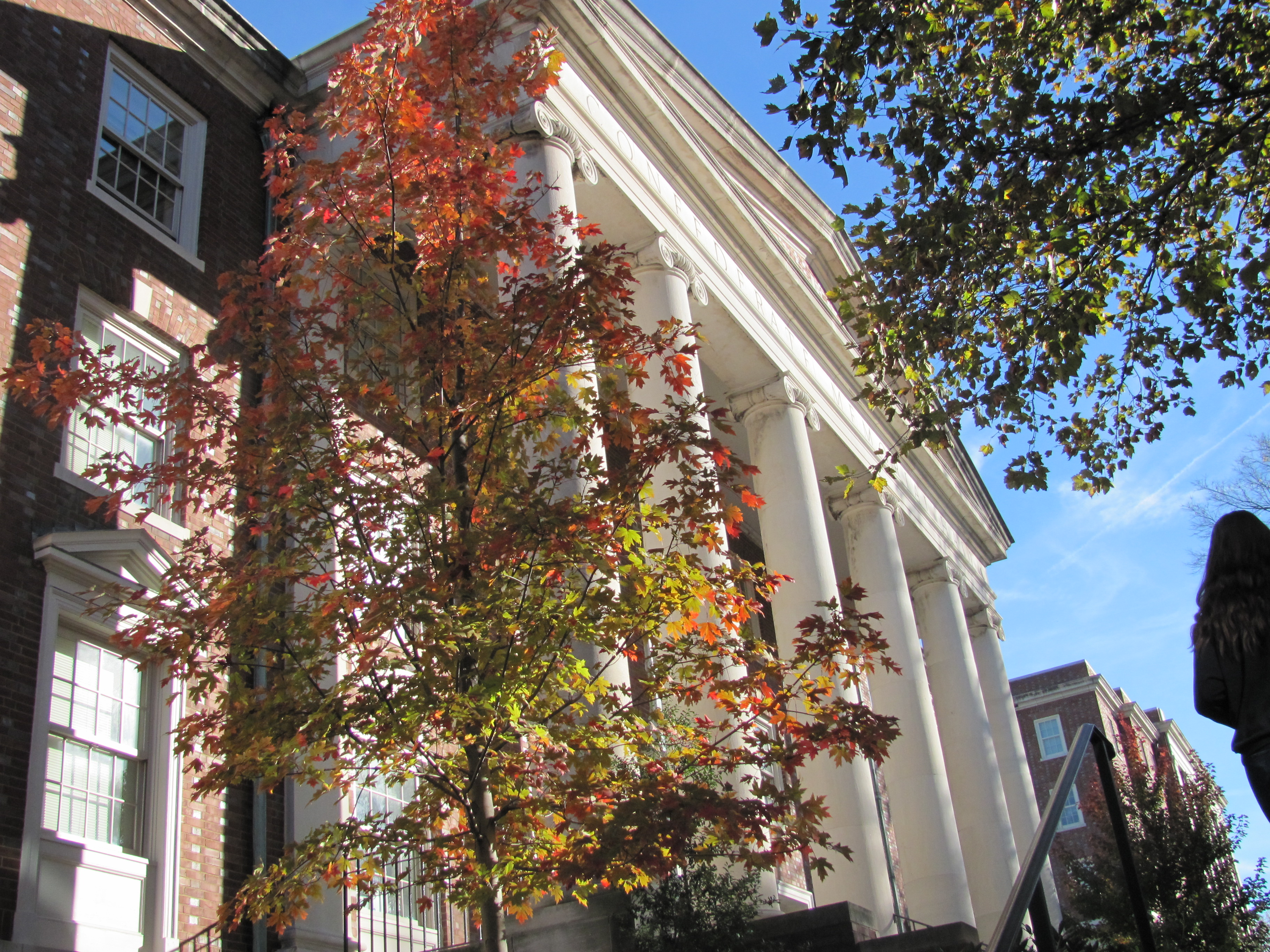
- Memorial Hall

- Location within Tennessee Location within the United States
- Location: 1212 21st Ave. S. and Edgehill Ave; Nashville, Tennessee
- Coordinates: 36°8′30″N 86°47′55″W
- Area: 50 acres (200,000 m^{2})
- Built: 1875
- Architect: Multiple
- Architectural style: Classical revival
- NRHP reference No.: 66000723

Significant dates
- Added to NRHP: October 15, 1966
- Designated NHL: December 21, 1965

Vanderbilt Peabody College of Education and Human Development (also known as Vanderbilt Peabody College, Peabody College, or simply Peabody) is the education school of Vanderbilt University, a private research university in Nashville, Tennessee. Founded in 1875, Peabody had a long history as an independent institution before merging with Vanderbilt University in 1979. The school is located on the Peabody Campus of Vanderbilt University in Nashville. The academic and administrative buildings surround the Peabody Esplanade and are southeast of Vanderbilt's main campus.

Peabody College is organized around five academic departments, and conducts research in education, psychology, and human development. The school offers undergraduate, master's, and doctoral degrees in more than 30 programs.

== History ==
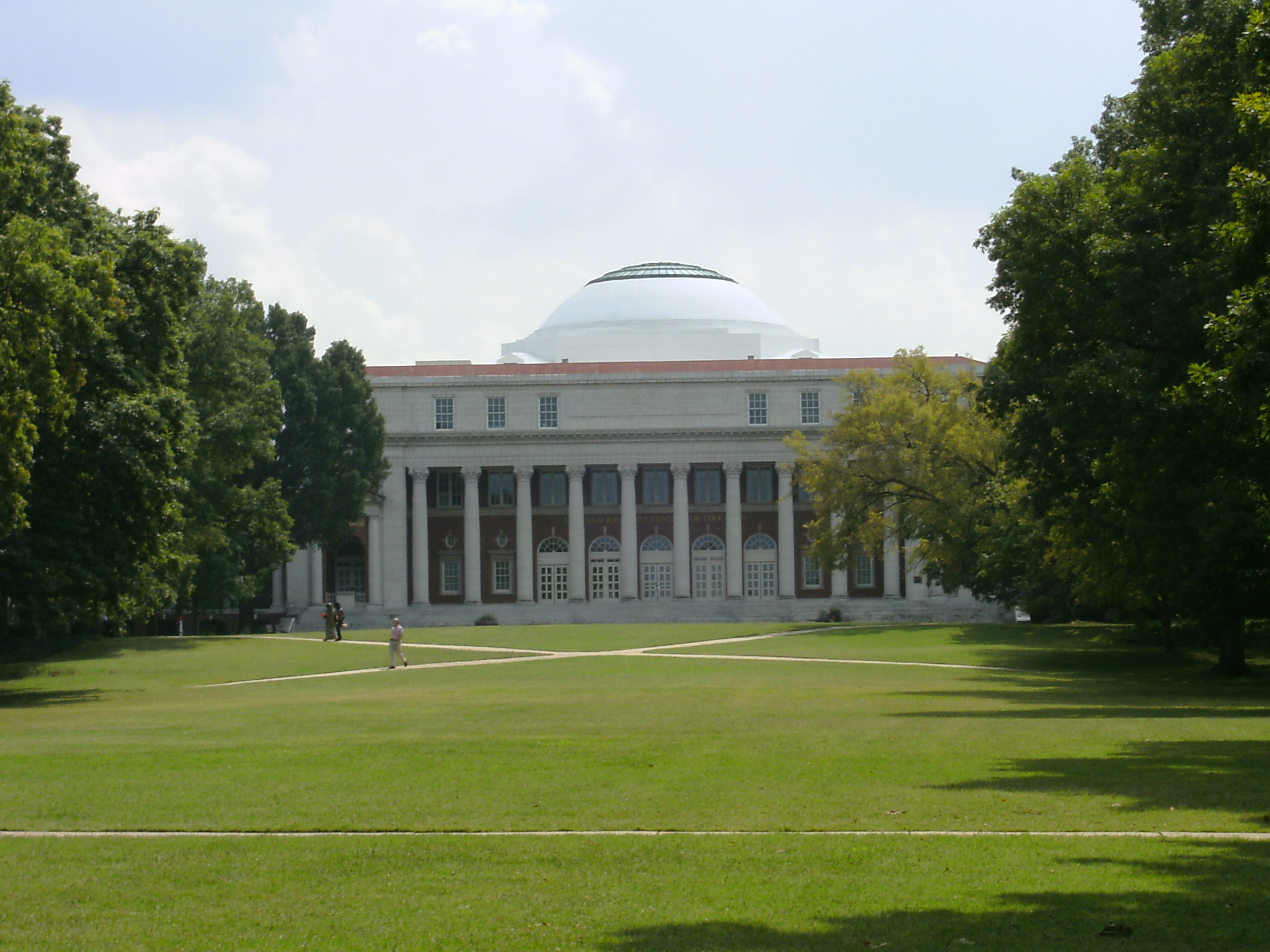
Peabody Lawn

=== Early years ===
Peabody College traces its history to 1785 when Davidson Academy was chartered by the state of North Carolina, of which Tennessee was then a part. In 1806, the school moved to downtown Nashville and was rechartered under the name Cumberland College. The institution was renamed once again to the University of Nashville in 1827.

In 1875, when the university was receiving financial assistance from the Peabody Education Fund started by George Peabody, the state legislature amended the charter to establish a State Normal School. The University of Nashville's operations were split into three separate entities. Its medical school became part of the newly established Vanderbilt University. Its preparatory school became independent as Montgomery Bell Academy, retaining the board of trustees from the University of Nashville. The literary arts collegiate program received the donation from the Peabody Education Fund and began emphasizing teacher preparation. In 1889, it was renamed Peabody Normal College.

=== George Peabody College for Teachers ===
In 1911, the George Peabody College for Teachers was moved from downtown Nashville to its present location directly across the street from the campus of Vanderbilt University. The location on what was then Nashville's western fringe was selected amidst high hopes for collaborations between the two institutions. The land for the new campus, which was donated to Peabody College, included the site of the campus of the former Roger Williams University, a school for African American students which was burned down in a series of arsons around 1906. Peabody was at that time a college for whites, although its "demonstration school" (now the University School of Nashville) became one of the first high schools in Nashville to be desegregated in the early 1960s. Peabody's first African American student, Tommie Morton-Young, graduated in 1955.

The design of the Peabody campus was inspired by the classical lines of Thomas Jefferson's design for the University of Virginia's Academical Village and the architecture of the 1893 World's Columbian Exposition in Chicago, Illinois. In contrast to the main Vanderbilt University campus, which is characterized by collegiate gothic architecture, Peabody's buildings and campus layout are examples of Palladian and Neoclassical styles of architecture.

Peabody became a renowned school of education, especially in the South. Notable faculty during the twentieth century included Joseph Peterson, Susan Gray, and Nicholas Hobbs. Hobbs helped to establish and then directed the John F. Kennedy Center for Education and Human Development at Peabody College. The Kennedy Center was founded in 1965 as one of twelve original university-based centers funded by the National Institute of Child Health and Human Development (NICHD) following the signing of the Community Mental Health Act of 1963.

Peabody seemed financially strong, due in part to an endowment that had been funded in part by its namesake, George Peabody. It had shared some facilities with Vanderbilt for many years, notably the Joint Universities Library, located across the street from Peabody's main academic buildings, and indeed closer to Peabody than to much of the main Vanderbilt academic quadrangle. Also, Peabody students were eligible for participation in Vanderbilt ROTC and the Vanderbilt Marching Band.

In the early 1970s Peabody students became eligible to participate in Vanderbilt athletic teams. This was said to be a concession to the fact that Peabody had no intercollegiate athletics of its own, but cynics noted that Peabody did have a major in physical education, a major frequently taken by scholarship athletes but one which had not been available at Vanderbilt, and the decision was seen by many as an attempt to get players onto Vanderbilt sports teams, notably football, who were not academically eligible for admission to Vanderbilt. In 1954, Nancy Reed won the women's individual intercollegiate golf championship (an event conducted by the Division of Girls' and Women's Sports (DGWS) — which later evolved into the current NCAA women's golf championship).

The 50-acre (20 ha) campus with its 22 main buildings was declared a National Historic Landmark in 1965 for its early association with George Peabody's funding efforts.

=== Merger with Vanderbilt University ===
Peabody College and Vanderbilt University had collaborated in a number of ways since 1914 when classes were first offered on Peabody's campus next to Vanderbilt. By the late 1970s a series of serious financial missteps had left Peabody's finances in such poor shape that the school's choices seemed to be reduced to three: either negotiating mergers with either primarily White Vanderbilt or primarily Black Tennessee State University or closing entirely. The former path was chosen, and Peabody became a part of Vanderbilt in 1979.

=== Development as part of Vanderbilt ===
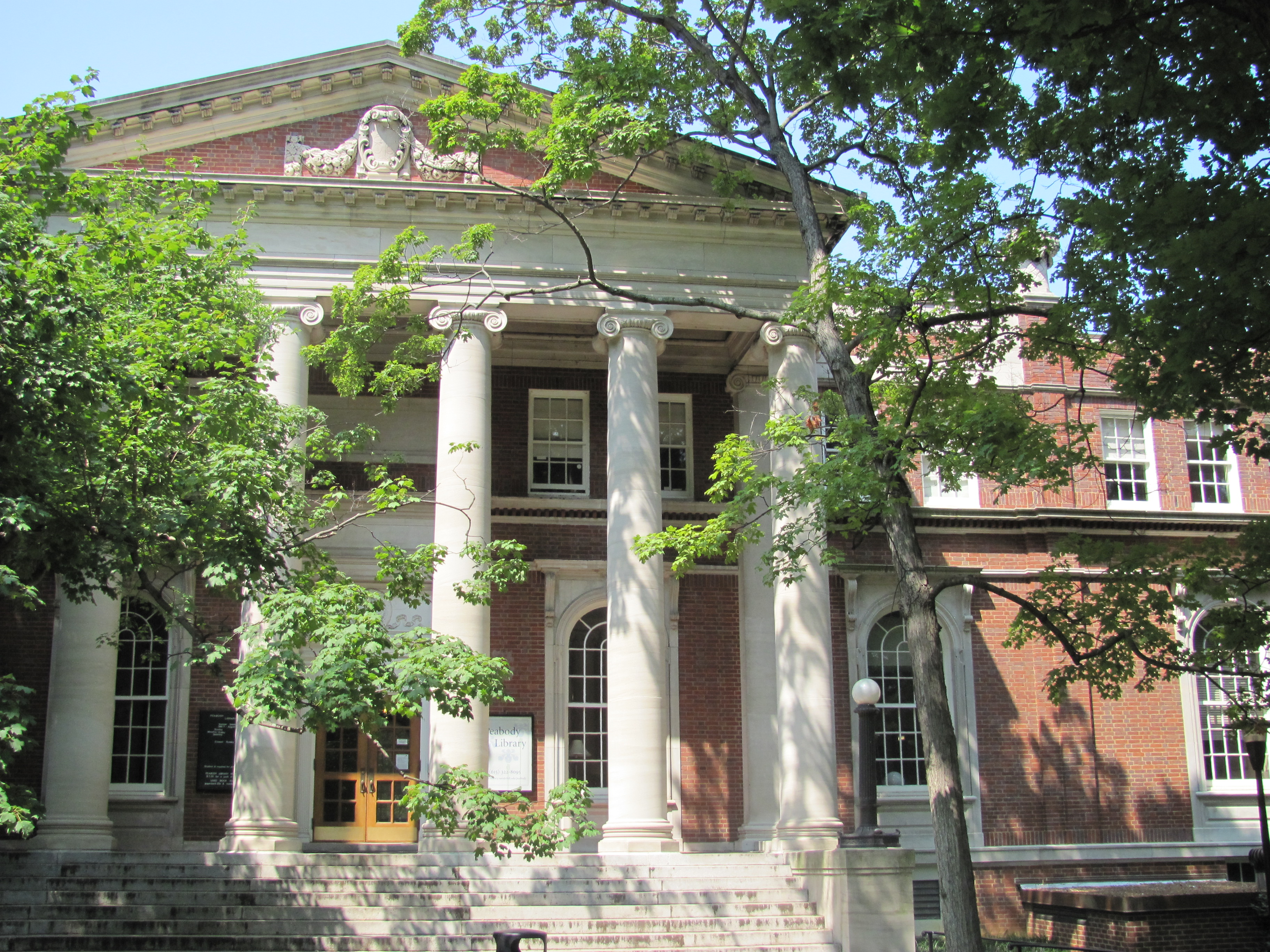
Peabody Library, Peabody College, Vanderbilt University.

For many years following the merger, Peabody maintained a considerable separate identity within Vanderbilt, but this is now somewhat diminished. In 2008, Peabody became the site of The Martha Rivers Ingram Commons, the housing for all first-year Vanderbilt students.

In an organizational sense, too, Peabody College constitutes a vital part of Vanderbilt University. As one of the university's ten schools, it not only trains undergraduate and graduate students – Peabody offers 6 Ph.D. programs, 3 Ed.D. program tracks, and 16 master's degree programs – but conducts substantial research in human learning and cognition and an array of other disciplines, including some research collaborations with Vanderbilt University Medical Center. It is now the host of 18 research centers, including two government-funded national research centers: the National Center on School Choice and the National Center on Performance Incentives. Peabody College is consistently ranked among the top graduate schools of education. Over the last 10 years, it has been ranked first among graduate schools of education by U.S. News & World Report five times, and seven of its graduate programs are currently ranked among the top five nationally, including #1 rankings for special education and education administration/supervision.

Peabody College publishes the Peabody Journal of Education, the second longest-running publication devoted exclusively to educational research, practice, and policy.

In 2017, Peabody began offering several online degree programs including an online Master of Education (M.Ed.) with a specialization in School Counseling and an online Doctorate of Education (Ed.D.) with a specialization in Leadership and Learning in Organizations.

== Administration and Organization ==
Peabody College's current dean is Camilla Benbow, who has served since 1998. Peabody College is organized into five academic departments:

- Department of Human and Organizational Development
- Department of Leadership, Policy, and Organizations
- Department of Psychology and Human Development
- Department of Special Education
- Department of Teaching and Learning

The following is a list of presidents of Peabody College (1875–1979) and its predecessor institutions (1785–1875) and deans of Peabody College after the merger with Vanderbilt University (1979–present).

	President or Dean	Tenure
1.	Thomas Craighead	1786–1809
2.	James Priestly	1809–1820
3.	Phillip Lindsley	1824–1850
4.	John Berrien Lindsley	1855–1873
5.	Eben S. Stearns	1875–1887
6.	William H. Payne	1887–1901
7.	James D. Porter	1901–1909
8.	Bruce Ryburn Payne	1911–1937
9.	Sidney C. Garrison	1937–1945
10.	Henry H. Hill	1945–1961
11.	Felix Robb	1961–1966
12.	John M. Claunch	1967–1974
13.	John Dunworth	1974–1980
14.	Willis Hawley	1980–1989
15.	James Pellegrino	1991–1998
16.	Camilla P. Benbow	1998–present

== Academics ==
=== Undergraduate ===
Peabody College is one of four schools at Vanderbilt University that awards degrees to undergraduates. Currently, students can earn a Bachelor of Science degree in seven undergraduate majors: Human and Organizational Development, Child Development, Elementary Education, Secondary Education, Special Education, Child Studies, and Cognitive Studies.

Human and Organizational Development (HOD) is one of the largest undergraduate majors at Vanderbilt University. Students can choose from one of five tracks to specialize in their studies.

=== Graduate ===
==== Master's degree programs ====
Peabody College offers roughly 20 master's degree programs, awarding either an EdM or an MPP degree. Students are able to pursue a dual degree with other Vanderbilt schools, such as Vanderbilt Law School or the Vanderbilt University School of Medicine. Undergraduates are also able to enroll in fifth-year master's degree programs through Peabody.

==== EdD programs ====
The Department of Leadership, Policy, and Organizations (LPO) offers a doctor of education degree (EdD) in K-12 education or higher education.

==== PhD programs ====
Peabody College offers six doctor of philosophy (PhD) programs:

- Community Research and Action
- Leadership and Policy Studies
- Psychological Sciences
- Special Education
- Teaching and Learning
- Educational Neuroscience

All Vanderbilt PhD programs are officially housed within the Graduate School.

== Campus buildings ==
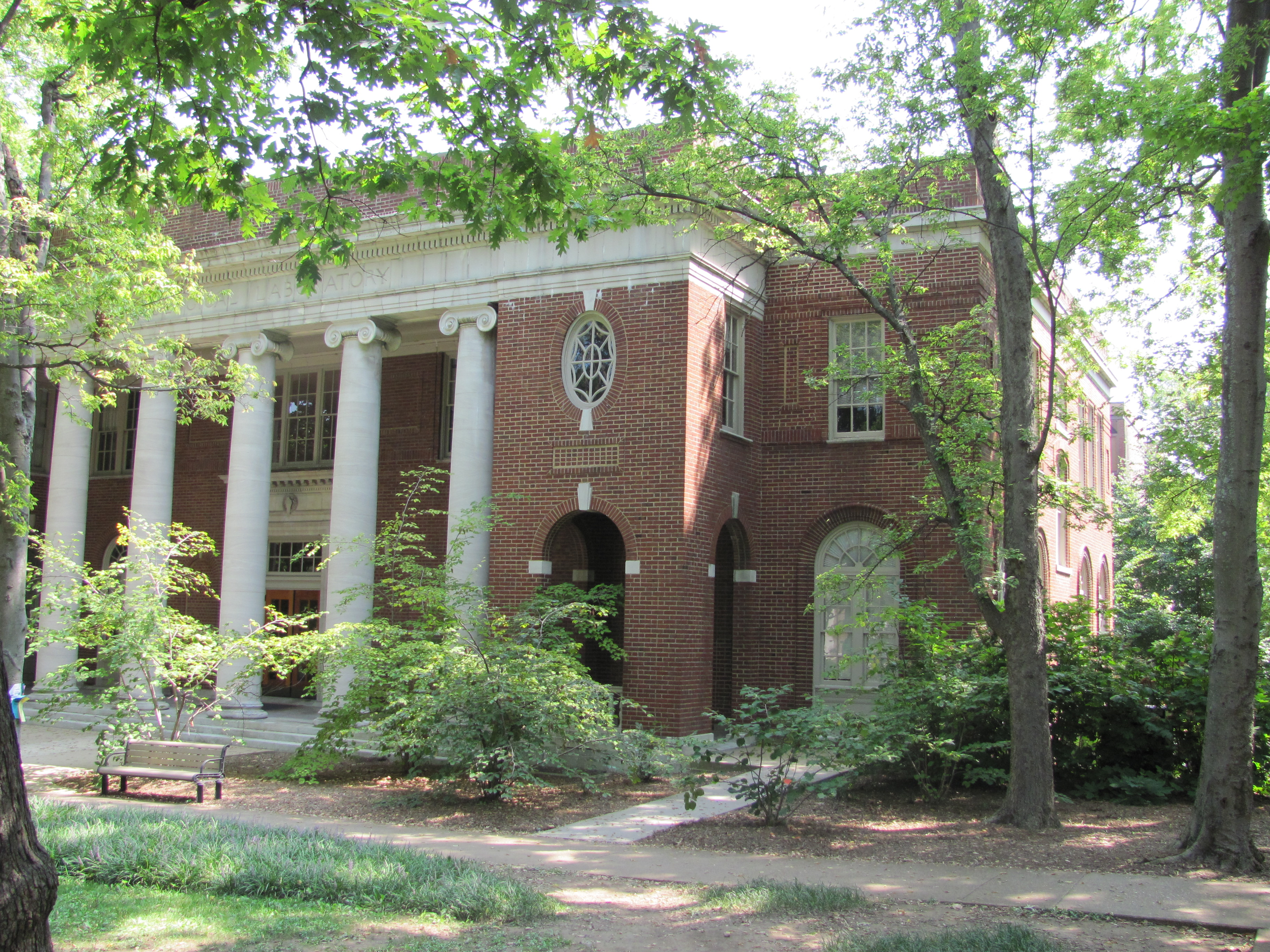
Jesup Psychological Building, Peabody Esplanade

- Wyatt Center (formerly the Social-Religious building)
- Peabody Library
- Home Economics Building
- Mayborn Building (formerly the Industrial Arts building)
- Cohen Memorial Hall (houses Vanderbilt Fine Arts Gallery whose collections include Peabody College's art collection)
- Payne Hall
- Peabody Administration Building
- Susan Gray School
- Jesup / Hobbs Buildings
- Vanderbilt Kennedy Center
- Martha Rivers Ingram Commons (consists of 10 dormitories housing all freshmen at Vanderbilt as well as the Commons Center)
- John Seigenthaler Center (houses the First Amendment Center)

== Notable alumni ==
- Scott Alden (1907–1977), Federal Bureau of Investigation Special Agent, special assistant to J. Edgar Hoover
- Robert E. Lee Allen (1865–1961), United States Representative from West Virginia (1923–1925)
- Gordon Anderson (1944–), sculptor and widower of film star Sondra Locke
- James Benjamin Aswell (1869–1931), United States Representative from Louisiana (1913–1931)
- Waldo Emerson Bailey (1896–1961), diplomat and U.S. Consul to London, England
- Alfred Baumeister (1934–2011), Vanderbilt Professor of Psychology known for his research on intellectual disabilities
- Preston Lang Bethea (1870–1944), member of the South Carolina Senate
- Theodore Bilbo (1877–1947), 39th and 43rd Governor of Mississippi, United States Senator from Mississippi (1935–1947)
- Bill Boner (1945–), Mayor of Nashville, United States Representative from Tennessee (1979–1987)
- Elizabeth Lee Bloomstein (1859–1927), American history professor, clubwoman, and suffragist
- Harold Bradley (1926–2019), session guitarist and entrepreneur, Musician's Hall of Fame
- Doak S. Campbell (1888–1973), 1st President of Florida State University
- Mel Chin (1951– ), conceptual artist and MacArthur Fellow
- Fred Coe (1914–1979), television producer and director, Peabody and Emmy winner
- Shirley Collado (B.A., 1994), 9th President of Ithaca College
- Compton Newby Crook (1908–1981), American science fiction writer, Hugo Award winner, namesake of the Compton Crook Award
- Julia Lester Dillon (1871–1959), teacher, landscape architect, and writer
- Herman Lee Donovan (1887–1964), 4th President of the University of Kentucky
- Ruth Denson Edwards (1893–1978), American hymnwriter and figure in the Sacred Harp movement
- J. McRee Elrod (1932–2016), Methodist activist for the Civil Rights Movement, anti-war and gay pride movements
- Tipper Gore (1948– ), activist, 35th Second Lady of the United States
- Red Grooms (born 1937), New York-based pop artist
- E. Bruce Heilman (1926–2019), 5th Chancellor of the University of Richmond
- Sylvia Hyman (1917–2012), American sculptor and ceramic artist
- William Inge (1913–1973), Pulitzer Prize-winning playwright, best known for Picnic
- Cone Johnson (1860–1933), Texas state senator and state legislator
- Z. T. Johnson (1897–1981), 8th President of Asbury University
- Connie Kasari, founding member of the Center for Autism Research and Treatment (CART) at UCLA
- Anne Gamble Kennedy (1920–2001), pianist, professor and accompanist for the Fisk Jubilee Singers
- Matthew Washington Kennedy (1921–2014), American classical pianist and composer
- Allie Beth Martin (1914–1976), President of the American Library Association
- Howard Justus McGinnis (1882–1971), 3rd President of East Carolina University
- Edward C. Merrill Jr. (1920–1995), 4th President of Gallaudet University
- Scott Douglas Miller, President of Virginia Wesleyan University, former president of Bethany College, Wesley College, and Lincoln Memorial University
- Charles N. Millican (1916–2010), founding President of University of Central Florida
- Fred Tom Mitchell (1891–1953), 10th President of Mississippi State University
- Bettie Page (1923–2008), American pop culture icon
- J. Percy Priest (1900–1956), teacher, journalist, United States Representative from Tennessee (1941–1956)
- Sylvia Lyons Render (1913–1986), academic, educator, and curator at the Library of Congress
- Martha E. Rogers (1914–1994) nursing theorist, creator of the science of unitary human beings
- Christine Sadler (1902–1983), pioneer female journalist; reporter and Sunday editor, The Washington Post; Washington D.C. editor, McCall's
- John Seigenthaler (1927–2014), founding editorial director of USA Today, founder of the First Amendment Center
- Jessie Carney Smith (1930– ), author, Dean of Fisk University Library
- Samuel L. Smith (1875–1956) American architect, academic administrator, educator, and former alumni and provost to Peabody
- John Abner Snell (1880–1936), medical missionary and superintendent of Soochow Hospital
- John Ridley Stroop (1897–1973), psychologist known for discovering the Stroop effect
- Carrie Sutherlin (1884–1971), college president
- Julie Tien (1937– ), Taiwanese politician and activist, National Women's League of Taiwan
- Robert Turner (1920–2012), Canadian composer, appointed Order of Canada in 2002
- Theodore Wachs (1941– ), American psychologist on development and behavioral genetics
- Ralph Wickiser (1910–1988), American painter
- John Edwin Windrow (1900–1984), educator and writer
- Howard H. Winger (1919-1997), dean and professor at the University of Chicago Graduate Library School
- Wolf Wolfensberger (1934–2011), creator of social role valorization, influencer of disability policy

== See also ==
- List of National Historic Landmarks in Tennessee
- National Register of Historic Places listings in Davidson County, Tennessee
