= Thomas Young (American revolutionary) =

American doctor, philosopher, and patriot (1731–1777)

- Born: February 19, 1731; Little Britain, New Windsor, New York Province, British North America
- Died: June 24, 1777 (aged 46); Philadelphia, Pennsylvania, U.S.
- Occupation: Physician
- Known for: Role in Boston Tea Party, creation of Vermont, and movement for American Independence

Thomas Young (February 19, 1731 – June 24, 1777) was a medical doctor, philosopher and a key organizer of the Boston Committee of Correspondence, Boston Tea Party, founding of Vermont, and Pennsylvania's independence from British rule. Historians consider Young one of the leading radicals of the American Revolution, though his importance in pushing the revolution forward has been largely forgotten.. Critics labeled Young a "firebrand" and "incendiary of the lower order." Young was a mentor and teacher to Ethan Allen and friend of Samuel Adams.

== Early life and activities ==
Thomas Young was born February 19, 1731, in Little Britain in New Windsor, New York. He was the son of first cousins John and Mary Crawford Young. John Young emigrated from Ireland to America in 1729 with a group led by Charles Clinton of County Longford.

Charles Clinton, John Young, and Mary Crawford Young were all second cousins through their grandparents, siblings James Clinton (1667–1718) and Margaret Clinton Parks (1650–1710). The Clintons, Youngs, and Crawfords shared a distant grandmother, Elizabeth Blount mistress of King Henry VIII and mother of the king's son Henry FitzRoy. As Covenanters, the Clinton family had escaped from Scotland to Ireland in the seventeenth century (New York Genealogical and Biographical Record 1882, Vol. 12: p. 193).

Although Charles Clinton and John Young had emigrated from Ireland with the intention of settling in Pennsylvania, near a group of fellow-Covenanters, their chartered ship, the George and Anne, was taken off-course by an unscrupulous captain who held Clinton and Young captive until they paid a ransom. During their captivity, most of their fellow passengers perished of small-pox, starvation, or ship fever. Finding themselves in Boston after this ordeal, within a year Young and Clinton made their way to Little Britain. It is unclear when Mary Crawford joined them in Little Britain or whether she was among the passengers of the George and Anne, although it seems likely that she emigrated with her cousins (New York Genealogical and Biographical Record 1882, Vol. 13, p. 882).

A biographical sketch of Charles Clinton describes Little Britain thus: "after investigation, [Charles Clinton] settled at a place designated (for town purposes until 1763) as 'the precinct of the highlands.' It is embraced in modern Orange County, but until after the Revolutionary War it was in Ulster County. His neighborhood was called Little Britain. James Kennedy, a New York merchant ... James Alexander, a New York lawyer and member of the Governor's council, and his co-partner, William Smith, had before secured grants of land in the precinct of the highlands. It was border-land toward the Indians, west of the Hudson, not yet settled by white men. It was without habitations, except Indian huts, and without roads, except Indian trails. So late as about 1845, more than one hundred years after this settlement, a living occupant could describe the appearance of one hundred wigwams on the side hills within sight of her father's house (Eager, p. 619)" (ibid.). Thomas Young's parents settled in farmland adjoining the Clintons, and here Thomas Young was born soon after the group's arrival in Little Britain.

After demonstrating much intellectual brilliance as a child, Thomas Young was apprenticed to a local physician and then began his own medical practice in Amenia in Dutchess County in 1753.

In 1755, he married Mary Winegar of Litchfield, Connecticut. They had two sons and four daughters. In August 1758 Young was indicted in the Crum Elbow Precinct of Dutchess County, New York, for speaking and publishing "blasphemous words" concerning the Christian religion.

Young met the young Ethan Allen while Allen was living in Salisbury, Connecticut, and Young was practicing medicine just across the provincial boundary in Amenia, New York. Only five years older than Allen, Young taught the younger Allen a great deal about philosophy and political theory. Young and Allen eventually decided to collaborate on a book intended to be an attack on organized religion, as Young had convinced Allen to become a Deist. They worked on the manuscript until 1764, when Young moved away from the area, taking the manuscript with him.

They also shared an interest in ingrafting, an early form of inoculation, particularly in relation to smallpox. Ingrafting was considered a heresy by New England clergy and punishable by law, if not conducted with the consent of the town selectman. In 1764, Allen insisted that Young inject him with the virus on the Salisbury meeting house steps to prove whether or not ingrafting worked. They did this on a Sunday. Allen did not suffer from the virus, but when news of what they had done spread Allen was hauled into court for a blasphemous response to the investigating official.

In October 1764, Young moved to Albany to establish a medical practice. While there his son Rasman was baptized at the Lutheran Church. Young invested in a real estate venture with John Henry Lydius, which subsequently failed. Young became involved in the resistance movement in Albany in the 1760s and helped found the Sons of Liberty there.

== Boston ==
Young arrived in Boston in 1765 and became a family physician to John Adams.

A committed radical populist, Young became deeply involved with Boston's Patriot movement, which centered around Samual Adams and James Otis, Jr.. He was the most active member and founder of the city’s Committee of Correspondence and became a committeeman for the Sons of Liberty. He was a prominent enough figure in the Sons of Liberty that he gave the oration at the first anniversary of the Boston Massacre.

Young is the first person to publicly suggest throwing British tea into Boston harbor, and is considered to be one of the active organizers of the Boston Tea Party, although the organizers purposely did not leave any record of their activities. In 1773 Philadelphia physician Benjamin Rush and member of the Philadelphia Sons of Liberty authored a diatribe inveighing against British Tea and its harmful properties, both physical and political. It was quickly reprinted in Boston, where Young had already spoken out in a similar vein in a letter to the Boston Evening Post of October 25. It is believed he himself did not actually participate in the destruction of the tea chests. At the time he was addressing a crowd at the Old South Meeting House on the negative health effects of tea drinking. According to the Boston Tea Party Museum, this was probably a diversion intended to help the Tea Party organizers by keeping the crowd in the Meeting House while the tea was being destroyed.

As one of Boston's leading radicals, he was a top target of the pro-British authorities in Massachusetts, and took pride in his status as a leading rabble-rouser. One night he was attacked on the street by two British soldiers, who, according to Young, nearly killed him and left him for dead. After this, his wife Mary became greatly "alarmed" and fearful for his safety.

Out of a concern for his safety and his wife's "reason", Young relocated his family to Newport, R.I. just as the tensions with Britain were leading the colonies to war. In Newport he remained active in supporting the patriot cause, and according to an account by his younger brother, Dr. Joseph Young, the local authorities and British troops eventually set out to capture him. But he was warned ahead of time, and barely escaped town in time to avoid arrest, eventually going to Philadelphia.

== Philadelphia ==
In 1775, he moved to Philadelphia and became involved in that colony's patriot movement, becoming a key member of a group of activists that included Thomas Paine and Timothy Matlack. This group, whose revolutionary activities were intentionally kept secret, are known today thanks to the diary of one of their members, Christopher Marshall. Young, Paine, Matlack, Marshall, and a few others were instrumental in organizing the peaceful, popular overthrow of Pennsylvania's colonial government on May 20, 1776 (likely working in concert with the Adams cousins in the Continental Congress, who Young was close to). Pennsylvania's new, revolutionary government supported independence from Britain, paving the way for America's Declaration of Independence.

As one of its framers and an outspoken radical, Young was instrumental in making Pennsylvania's the state constitution of 1776 by far the most radically democratic constitution among the original states. The highly democratic form of Pennsylvania's government was inspired in large part by Thomas Paine's suggestions for the formation of new state governments in Common Sense. Benjamin Franklin took a copy of this Constitution with him to France, where it was hailed by many French intellectuals for its revolutionary ideals.

Reflecting his radical politics, Young played a key role in the founding of Vermont. He wrote to disaffected residents of what was then a part of New York suggesting they set up their own state government, and even suggested the name of Vermont for the new state, which was originally called New Connecticut. His statement that the Continental Congress would support the creation of this new state greatly encouraged Vermont's founders to go through with its creation. But the Congress later vehemently repudiated Young and the legality of his suggestion, which would have created a precedent for any group of disaffected citizens to form their own state upon their own authority. Nevertheless, eventually Congress did recognize Vermont as a state.

Young's suggestion of the name Vermont derived from the fact that most of Vermont was in the Green Mountains, said to have been named by Samuel de Champlain. Young chose to combine Latin terms "vert" (green) with "mont" (mountain) to honor the Green Mountain Boys. Young named several communities in New York state, including Amenia.

Young died in Philadelphia on June 24, 1777, aged 46, of a fever contracted while working in a military hospital.

== Deism ==
In 1772 Young published a deist statement of beliefs in a Boston newspaper.

== Works ==
- A Poem to the Memory of James Wolfe ... Who was slain upon the Plains of Abraham, (1761)
- Reflections on the Disputes Between New York, New Hampshire and Col. John Henry Lydius in which he railed against land speculators and the New York aristocracy. (1764)
- Reason: the Only Oracle of Man – with Ethan Allen (published posthumously by Allen 1785)
