= John Beatty (New Jersey politician) =

American politician (1749–1826)

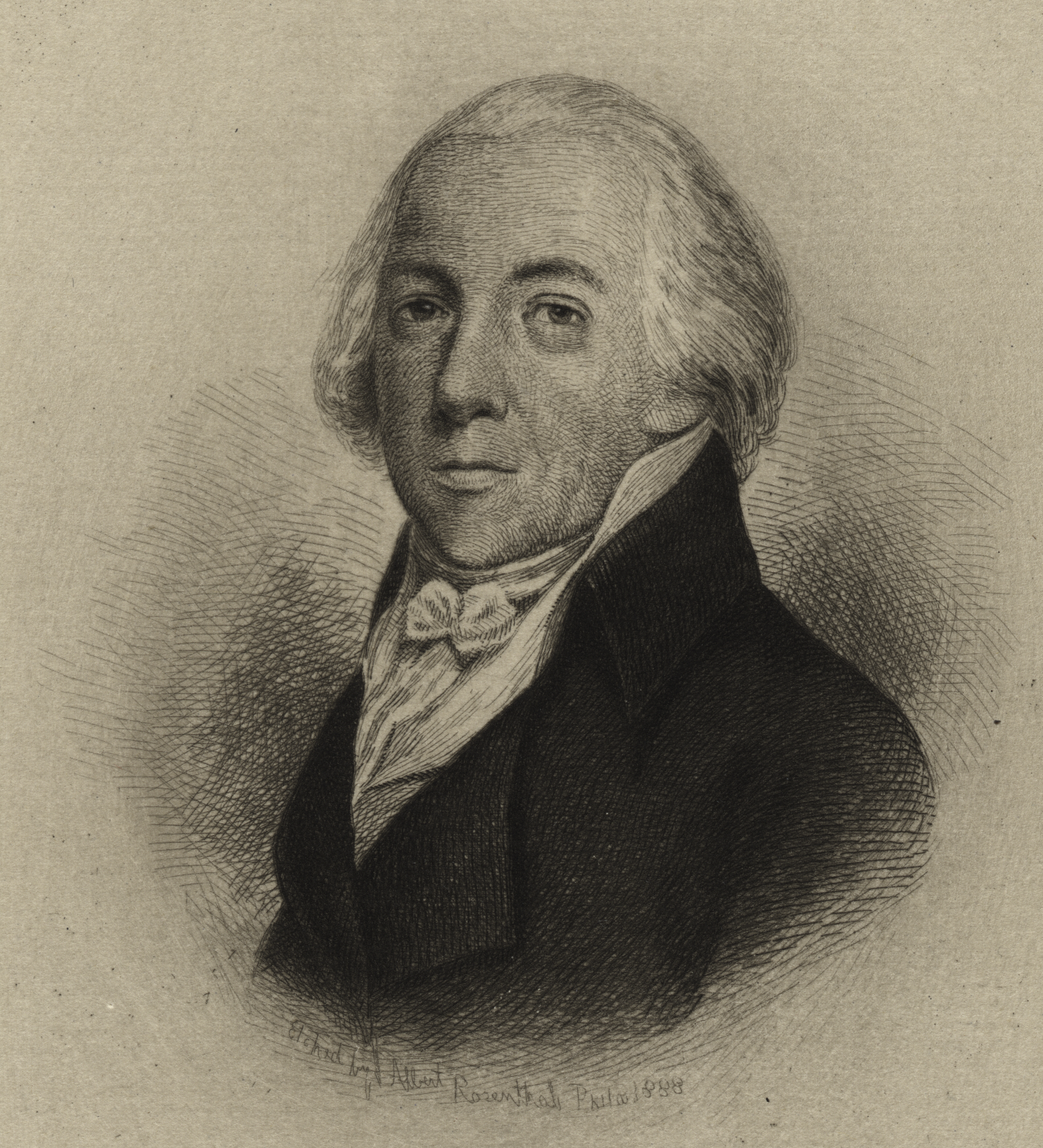

Secretary of State of New Jersey
- In office 1795–1805
- Governor: Richard Howell; Joseph Bloomfield
- Preceded by: Samuel W. Stockton
- Succeeded by: James Linn

Member of the U.S. House of Representatives from New Jersey's at-large district
- In office 1793 – 1795 alongside Elias Boudinot, Abraham Clark, Jonathan Dayton, and Lambert Cadwalader
- Preceded by: Elias Boudinot, Abraham Clark, Jonathan Dayton, and Aaron Kitchell
- Succeeded by: Jonathan Dayton, Aaron Kitchell, Mark Thomson, Thomas Henderson, and Isaac Smith

Speaker of the New Jersey General Assembly
- In office 1789–1790
- Preceded by: Benjamin Van Cleve
- Succeeded by: Jonathan Dayton

Personal details
- Born: December 10, 1749 Neshaminy, Province of Pennsylvania, British America
- Died: May 30, 1826 (aged 76) Trenton, New Jersey, U.S.
- Relations: John Reading (grandfather); James Clinton (great-grandfather)
- Education: College of New Jersey
- Occupation: Physician, politician

John Beatty (December 10, 1749 – May 30, 1826) was an American medical doctor, statesman and slaveowner from Princeton, New Jersey.

== Early life ==
Coat of Arms of John Beatty

He was born in Neshaminy in the Province of Pennsylvania on December 10, 1749. Beatty was the oldest of ten children of Irish born Rev. Charles Clinton Beatty (1715–1772) and Anne (née Reading) Beatty (1723–1768), who were married in 1746. His father was a Presbyterian minister who did missionary work among the Native Americans. At John Beatty was several siblings, including Mary Beatty (1747–1842), who was married William Enoch Green (1734–1776), Elizabeth Beatty (1752–1825), who was married tutor Philip Vickers Fithian (1747–1776), Reading Beatty (1757–1831), Erkuries Beatty (1759–1823) and William Pitt Beatty (1766–1848).

His maternal grandfather was John Reading (1686–1767), president of the New Jersey Provincial Council and acting Governor of the province of New Jersey. His paternal grandparents were John Beatty (1645–1729) and Christiana (née Clinton) Beatty (1685–1776). John's grandmother was the daughter of James Clinton (c. 1667–1718) and the sister of Charles Clinton (1690–1773) (himself the father of Revolutionary War Major General James Clinton (1736–1812) and Vice President George Clinton (1739–1812), and the grandfather of New York Governor DeWitt Clinton (1769–1828)).

Beatty graduated from the College of New Jersey (later known as Princeton University) in 1769. He was a student of Founding Father Benjamin Rush.

== Career ==
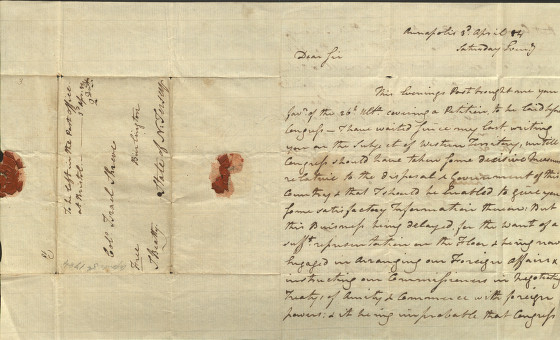
Letter from John Beatty, 1784

Beatty became a doctor and opened his first practice in Hartsville, Pennsylvania. He rose to the rank of major in the 6th Pennsylvania Regiment of the Continental Army during the American Revolutionary War. He was captured at the surrender of Fort Washington on November 16, 1776. After his exchange, he was appointed Commissary General for Prisoners with the rank of colonel.

By the end of the war he had become a resident of New Jersey, serving as a member of the New Jersey Legislative Council (now the New Jersey Senate) from 1781 to 1783, representing Middlesex County, and delegate from that state to the Continental Congress in 1784 and 1785.

In 1784, when Thomas Jefferson's proposed ban on slavery in all future territories came up for a vote in Congress, Beatty became sick and was absent from the meeting. As Jefferson noted, "[Je]rsey would have been for it, but there were but two members, one of whom [Beatty] was sick in his chambers"; thus, New Jersey could not submit its vote. The proposal failed to pass by one vote.

Beatty was the speaker of the New Jersey General Assembly from 1789 to 1790, an unsuccessful candidate for the U.S. House of Representatives in 1791, and a member of the U.S. House of Representatives in the Third Congress from 1793 to 1795. While serving in the U.S. House, he was one of nine representatives to vote against the Eleventh Amendment to the United States Constitution. He later served as Secretary of State of New Jersey from 1795 to 1805.

== Personal life ==
Beatty was married to Catherine DeKlyn, the daughter of Mary (née Van Sant) DeKlyn and Barnt DeKlyn, who became wealthy selling textiles to the Continental Army during the American Revolution. Together, they were the parents of Robert Beatty and William Beatty.

Beatty was admitted as an original member of The Society of the Cincinnati in the state of New Jersey, and served as the organization's treasurer from 1823 until his death on May 30, 1826, in Trenton in Mercer County, New Jersey.

=== Legacy ===
The Presbyterian Historical Society in Philadelphia, Pennsylvania, has a collection of personal papers, including diaries, correspondences and genealogical notes, related to the Beatty Family. Besides John Beatty's papers, the collection also includes journals by his father, Charles Clinton Beatty, who served as an early missionary with George Duffield among Native Americans.

U.S. House of Representatives
Preceded by Elias Boudinot, Abraham Clark, Jonathan Dayton, and Aaron Kitchell on a General ticket	Member of the U.S. House of Representatives from New Jersey's at-large congressional district alongside Elias Boudinot, Abraham Clark, Jonathan Dayton, and Lambert Cadwalader on a General ticket 1793–1795	Succeeded by Jonathan Dayton, Aaron Kitchell, Mark Thomson, Thomas Henderson, and Isaac Smith on a General ticket
Political offices
Preceded by Benjamin Van Cleve	Speaker of the New Jersey General Assembly; 1789–1790	Succeeded by Jonathan Dayton
Preceded by Samuel W. Stockton	Secretary of State of New Jersey; 1795–1805	Succeeded by James Linn
