= James Clinton (disambiguation) =

James Clinton (1733–1812) was an American Revolutionary War officer.

James Clinton may also refer to:

- James Clinton (soldier) (1667–1718), Irish soldier and politician
- James G. Clinton (1804–1849), American lawyer and politician
- James Vivian Clinton, Nigerian journalist
- James Clinton (sternwheeler), a steamboat on the upper Willamette River
- Jim Clinton (1850–1921), outfielder in Major League Baseball
