= James G. Clinton =

American politician (1804–1849)

Member of the U.S. House of Representatives from New York
- In office March 4, 1841 – March 3, 1845
- Preceded by: Nathaniel Jones
- Succeeded by: Archibald C. Niven
- Constituency: 6th district (1841–43); 9th district (1843–45)

Personal details
- Born: James Graham Clinton; January 2, 1804 Little Britain, New York, US
- Died: May 28, 1849 (aged 45) New York City, US
- Resting place: Woodlawn Cemetery in New Windsor
- Party: Democratic
- Relations: See Clinton family
- Parent(s): James Clinton; Mary Little
- Education: Newburgh Academy
- Occupation: Lawyer, Politician

James Graham Clinton (January 2, 1804 – May 28, 1849) was an American lawyer and politician. He served two terms as a U.S. representative from New York from 1841 to 1845.

He was part of the prominent Clinton family that produced a number of political and military leaders in the early days of the American republic.

== Early life ==
Born in Little Britain, New York, on January 2, 1804, he was the son of Mary Little (1768–1835) and Major-General James Clinton (1736–1812), a brevet major general in the American Revolutionary War. He was the half brother of DeWitt Clinton (1769–1828), the 6th Governor of New York, and George Clinton, Jr. (1771–1809), a U.S. Representative, through his father's first marriage to Mary De Witt (1737–1795). His uncle was George Clinton (1739–1812), who served as the 1st and 3rd Governor of New York from 1777 to 1795 and the U.S. Vice President from 1805 to 1812. His grandfather was Col. Charles Clinton (1690–1773), an Anglo-Irish colonel during the French and Indian War.

Clinton attended the common schools and Newburgh Academy. He studied law, was admitted to the bar in 1823 and practiced in Newburgh.

== Career ==
Clinton served as Orange County Master in Chancery, and judge of the county court of common pleas.

=== Military ===
He served as director of the Newburgh Whaling Company and of the Delaware and Hudson Railway. Clinton was also a colonel in the New York Militia.

=== Congress ===
Clinton was elected as a Democrat to the Twenty-seventh and Twenty-eighth Congresses (March 4, 1841 – March 3, 1845). He served as chairman of the Committee on Public Expenditures (Twenty-eighth Congress). He was not a candidate for reelection in 1844, and resumed practicing law.

== Death and burial ==
Clinton died in New York City on May 28, 1849, at the age of 45. He was interred in the family cemetery at Little Britain, and reinterred at Woodlawn Cemetery in New Windsor.

U.S. House of Representatives
Preceded by Nathaniel Jones	Member of the U.S. House of Representatives from New York's 6th congressional district March 4, 1841 – March 3, 1843	Succeeded by Hamilton Fish
Preceded by Hiram P. Hunt	Member of the U.S. House of Representatives from New York's 9th congressional district March 4, 1843 – March 3, 1845	Succeeded by Archibald C. Niven
