= George Clinton Jr. =

American politician and lawyer (1771–1809)

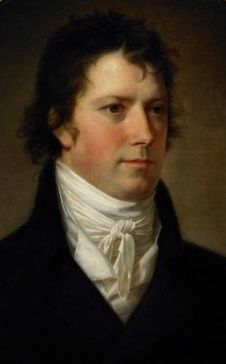
- John Vanderlyn portrait, circa 1805. Museum of the City of New York collections.

Member of the U.S. House of Representatives from New York
- In office February 14, 1805 – March 3, 1809
- Preceded by: Samuel L. Mitchill
- Succeeded by: Gurdon S. Mumford; William Denning; Jonathan Fisk
- Constituency: 3rd district (1805); 2nd district (1805–09)

Personal details
- Born: June 6, 1771 New York City
- Died: September 16, 1809 (aged 38) New York City
- Party: Democratic-Republican
- Spouse: Hannah Franklin (m. 1801)
- Relations: See Clinton family
- Parent(s): James Clinton; Mary De Witt
- Education: Columbia College
- Occupation: Lawyer, politician

George Clinton Jr. (June 6, 1771 – September 16, 1809) was an American politician and lawyer who served as a U.S. representative from New York from 1805 to 1809.

== Early life ==
He was born in New York City on June 6, 1771, the son of Mary De Witt and James Clinton, a brevet major general in the American Revolutionary War. He was the brother of DeWitt Clinton (1769–1828), the 6th governor of New York, and half-brother of James Graham Clinton, also a U.S. Representative.

He was the nephew of George Clinton (1739–1812), who served as the 1st and 3rd governor of New York from 1777 to 1795 and the U.S. Vice President from 1805 to 1812. His grandfather was Col. Charles Clinton (1690–1773), an Anglo-Irish colonel during the French and Indian War.

He graduated from Columbia College in 1793, studied law, and became an attorney.

== Career ==
He was involved in farming and business in New York City and New Windsor, and was an incorporator of the Newburgh and Cochecton Turnpike Company.

=== Politics and elected office ===
Clinton was an early member of the Tammany Hall organization, including serving as one of its sachems. He was a delegate to the New York State constitutional convention in 1801. In political organizing and at conventions, George Clinton Jr. was a manager and leader of the allies of his uncle George, in opposition to adherents of Aaron Burr as the two groups fought for supremacy in the Democratic-Republican Party.

He served in the New York State Assembly from 1804 to 1805. He was elected to the United States House of Representatives as a Democratic-Republican to fill the vacancy caused when Samuel L. Mitchill resigned to accept election to the United States Senate. He was subsequently elected to two full terms, and served from February 14, 1805, to March 3, 1809.

While in Congress George Clinton was one of the signers of a document protesting the caucus which nominated James Madison as the candidate of the Democratic-Republicans for President in 1808.

== Personal life ==
In 1801 George Clinton married Hannah Franklin (1780–1843). His wife was the sister of DeWitt Clinton's first wife, Mary Franklin, and a descendant of John Bowne and Elizabeth Fones. They had three children:

- Mary Caroline Clinton (1802–1870), who married Henry Overing
- Franklin Clinton, who died as a child
- Julia Matilda Clinton (d. 1880), who first married George C. Tallmadge. She later married James Foster Jr.

George Clinton died at his home in the Bloomingdale area of New York City, aged 38, on September 16, 1809.

U.S. House of Representatives
Preceded by Samuel L. Mitchill	Member of the U.S. House of Representatives from New York's 3rd congressional district 1805	Succeeded by Gurdon S. Mumford, George Clinton Jr.
Preceded by Joshua Sands, George Clinton Jr.	Member of the U.S. House of Representatives from New York; 2nd and 3rd District; 1805–1809 with Gurdon S. Mumford	Succeeded by Gurdon S. Mumford, William Denning, Jonathan Fisk
