= The New York Researcher =

The New York Researcher is a quarterly newsletter published by The New York Genealogical and Biographical Society (NYGBS). Since 1990, it has been mailed to all NYGBS members and also to libraries that subscribe to The New York Genealogical and Biographical Record. The Researcher carries reports on the Society's activities and news of other current events relevant to genealogy in New York State. Previous to the Winter 2004 issue, the newsletter was titled The NYG&B Newsletter.

The Genealogical Exchange is the queries section of the Researcher. Each member of the Society may have their queries published in this section; up to 50 words per issue free, and 51 to 100 words for $5, with a limit of 100 words per issue. Non-members may also have their queries published for a fee of $5 for 50 words or $10 for 100 words. All queries are also posted to the New York Genealogical and Biographical Society's official website.

The feature articles of the Researcher have made it a particularly useful research tool for New York genealogists. These articles cover topics such as descriptions of sources for New York genealogy, such as probate records, church records, census records, descriptions of holdings of other New York State libraries and record repositories, "How to" articles on New York genealogical research, both statewide and for particular counties or cities, religious or ethnic groups, or time periods, lists of accounts of New York families "hidden" in multi-family works, manuscript collections, and periodicals, articles on New York families published in other periodicals, past and present.

The Researcher is edited by Lauren Maehrlein, NYGBS Director of Education. Back issues are available, along with an every-name index to volumes 1-6 (1990–1995), through the New York Genealogical and Biographical Society.

== See also ==
- The New York Genealogical and Biographical Record
- New York Genealogical and Biographical Society
