= Gurdon S. Mumford =

American politician

President of the New York Stock Exchange
- In office 1818–1824
- Preceded by: Anthony Stockholm
- Succeeded by: Edward Lyde

Member of the U.S. House of Representatives from New York
- In office March 4, 1805 – March 3, 1811 Serving with William Denning and Samuel L. Mitchill
- Preceded by: George Clinton Jr.
- Succeeded by: William Paulding Jr. Samuel L. Mitchill
- Constituency: 2nd district and 3rd district (1805–1809); 2nd district (1809–1811)

Personal details
- Born: Gurdon Saltonstall Mumford; January 29, 1764 New London, Connecticut, British America
- Died: April 30, 1831 (aged 67) New York City, United States
- Party: Democratic-Republican
- Spouses: Anna Van Zandt (after 1793) Letitia Van Toren (m. 1810)
- Parent(s): David Mumford; Rebecca Winthrop Saltonstall

Gurdon Saltonstall Mumford (January 29, 1764 – April 30, 1831) was a United States representative from New York.

== Early life ==
Mumford was born in New London, Connecticut on January 29, 1764, and named in honor of his maternal grandfather. He was the second son of David Mumford Sr., a descendant of Thomas Mumford (one of the earliest settlers in Rhode Island), and Rebecca Winthrop Mumford (née Saltonstall), a granddaughter of Gurdon Saltonstall, the 25th Governor of Connecticut Colony.

He attended the common schools.

== Career ==
Through the influence of his uncle, U.S. Envoy to France Silas Deane (the husband of his mother's younger sister, Elizabeth Saltonstall), he was a private secretary to Benjamin Franklin during the latter part of his official residence in Paris.

In 1785, he returned to America with Franklin and settled in New York City where he became associated with his brothers in the commission business in 1791. In 1805, he was elected as a Democratic-Republican to the Ninth Congress to fill the vacancy caused by the resignation of Representative-elect Daniel D. Tompkins. Among his colleagues in Congress from New York were George Clinton Jr., Henry W. Livingston, Uri Tracy, Philip Van Cortlandt, and Killian K. Van Rensselaer.

He was reelected to the Tenth and Eleventh Congresses and served from March 4, 1805 to March 3, 1811. While in the House, he was chairman of the Committee on Commerce and Manufactures during the Ninth Congress.

Mumford was a presidential elector in 1812 and voted for Dewitt Clinton and Jared Ingersoll.

=== Later career ===
After retiring from active political life, he was elected director of the Bank of New York in 1812, and opened a broker's office in Wall Street in 1813. Mumford was one of the original founders of the New York Stock Exchange. From 1818 to 1824, he served as the second president of the New York Stock Exchange, succeeding Anthony Stockholm.

Mumford was also a member of the Société Française de Bienfaisance de New-York (also known as the French Benevolent Society of New York), which was established to help needy French and Swiss immigrants in 1806. In addition to its philanthropy, it was also a social club for its members.

== Personal life ==
On November 2, 1793, Mumford was married to Anna Van Zandt in the Reformed Dutch Church. Together, they were the parents of:

- Benjamin Franklin Mumford (1796–1817)
- Tobias Van Zandt Mumford (1796–1875), who married Mary Oliver Manwaring of Philadelphia. After her death, he married Catherine Brooks of New York.

After the death of his first wife, he remarried to Letitia Van Toren in 1810. Together, they lived at 23 Broadway and were the parents of:

- Gurdon Saltonstall Mumford Jr. (1811–1870), who married Catherine A. Snow (b. 1819) in 1866.
- George Clinton Mumford (b. 1812), who died in infancy.
- Anne Letitia Mumford (b. 1812), who married John Osgood.
- Emma Letitia Mumford (1814–1879), who died unmarried.
- George Washington Mumford (b. 1814), who died in infancy.
- George Lafayette Mumford, who died in infancy.
- Mary Margarita Mumford (1826–1888), who married Aaron Price Ransom (1825–1893) in 1846.
- Cornelia Matilda Mumford, who married George Warren Geer.

He died from a lingering illness in New York City on Saturday, April 30, 1831 and was interred in the Old Collegiate Dutch Church Cemetery.

U.S. House of Representatives
Preceded by Joshua Sands, George Clinton, Jr.	Member of the U.S. House of Representatives from New York; 2nd and 3rd District; 1805–1809 with George Clinton Jr.	Succeeded by Gurdon S. Mumford, William Denning, Jonathan Fisk
Preceded by Gurdon S. Mumford, George Clinton, Jr.	Member of the U.S. House of Representatives from New York's 2nd congressional district 1809–1811 with William Denning and Samuel L. Mitchill	Succeeded by William Paulding, Jr., Samuel L. Mitchill
