= New York Genealogical and Biographical Society =

American non-profit genealogical society

- Founded: New York City, United States (1869)
- Type: Genealogical society
- Purpose: Family history, Genealogy, Kinship and descent
- Location: New York City, U.S.
- Region served: New York state
- Services: Genealogical records, Historical records, Genealogy research, Genealogy education
- Website: www.newyorkfamilyhistory.org

The New York Genealogical and Biographical Society (NYG&B or NYGBS) is a non-profit institution located at 36 West 44th Street in New York City. Founded in 1869, it is the second-oldest genealogical society in the United States, and the only statewide genealogical society in New York state. Its purpose is to collect and make available information on genealogy, biography, and history, particularly in relation to New Yorkers. The Society also publishes periodicals and books, conducts educational programs, maintains a Committee on Heraldry, and offers other services.

== History ==
=== Creation ===
The New York Genealogical and Biographical Society was organized on the evening of February 27, 1869, by seven gentlemen meeting at the home of Dr. David Parsons Holton in New York City. On March 26 a certificate of incorporation was filed in the office of the Secretary of State of New York, stating that "the particular business and objects of the Society are to discover, procure, preserve and perpetuate whatever may relate to Genealogy and Biography, and more particularly to the genealogies and biographies of families, persons and citizens associated and identified with the State of New York." In April the By-Laws were adopted and officers elected, the first president being the historian Dr. Henry R. Stiles. The seal of the Society was adopted on May 8, 1869.

The founders were inspired by the example of the New England Historic Genealogical Society. While the New England society did not admit female members for many years, the New York society admitted its first female member on May 1, 1869, a few months after its creation.

The Society immediately established a library, and in December 1869 published an eight-page Bulletin. The reception of this publication encouraged the Trustees to launch a quarterly journal, The New York Genealogical and Biographical Record, the first issue of which was dated January 1870. The Record became the second-oldest genealogical periodical in continuous publication in the English-speaking world.

The Society's first permanent home was at Mott Memorial Hall, a house at 64 Madison Avenue near Madison Square Park. In 1888 the Society obtained space in the Berkeley Lyceum Building at 19 West 41st Street, and two years later moved to the new Berkeley Lyceum building at 23 West 44th Street. In 1891 Mrs. Elizabeth Underhill Coles died, leaving the Society a bequest of $20,000. With this money the Society was able to purchase a four-story brownstone at 226 West 58th Street, between Broadway and Seventh Avenue, in 1896. This became Genealogical Hall, the home of the Society for the next 33 years.

=== New facility ===
By 1912, the library had become too large to fit inside Genealogical Hall, and the Trustees decided to try to raise $65,000 to acquire the adjacent building lot for expansion. J. Pierpont Morgan contributed $10,000 on the condition that the Society raise the remainder, and this was accomplished by the end of 1913, mainly through the efforts of president Clarence Winthrop Bowen.

The expansion was ultimately precluded, and Bowen was still president when the Society moved building at 122-126 East 58th Street in 1928. The new facility, erected at a cost of $300,000, replaced three brownstone houses on the site. It was designed by La Farge, Warren and Clark. The formal dedication on December 11, 1929, was attended by former President of the United States Calvin Coolidge and former New York Governor (and future Chief Justice of the United States) Charles Evans Hughes. The new building provided ample space for the growth of the library.

Over the years the Society had also expanded its publications program. By 1929 each issue of the Record ran over 100 pages, and it had become recognized as one of the leading scholarly journals of genealogy. The Society had also published several volumes of its Collections from 1890. However, the Great Depression and World War II slowed the Society's progress; for instance, the Record became greatly reduced in size. In the years after the war, interest in genealogy declined.

=== Change ===
The Society formerly catered mostly to the well-to-do, but by the 1970s, there was increasing interest in 19th-century records, which were also now becoming more accessible. This was fueled by interest by descendants of 19th-century immigrants as well as African Americans, which in turn had resulted from 1977 telecast of Alex Haley's book Roots and the 1976 U.S. Bicentennial. The increased mobility of the population and increases in leisure time were other factors in the expansion of genealogical interest.

As a result, the Society started to expand, and in the late 1980s computers began to be used in administration, publishing, and the library. In 1990, the NYG&B Newsletter was launched and became an instant success; it was renamed The New York Researcher in 2004. At first an eight-page publication, the newsletter now contains an average of 24 pages per issue. In 1995, after the Society celebrated its 125th anniversary, the Record passed the same milestone. The Society continues to publish books dealing with New York genealogy.

The Society's formal education programs began in 1977 with a fall lecture series. Since then, each year's local calendar has been filled with a variety of lectures as well as book signings, walking tours, all-day events, and a biennial genealogical conference. Beginning in 1992 the Society conducted many out of town programs, often in cooperation with other genealogical societies. The Society has also established a presence at national, regional and local genealogical conferences sponsored by other organizations.

With the growing popularity of the Internet in the 1990s, the NYG&B launched its own website, nygbs.org (now newyorkfamilyhistory.org) in December 1998. The site has been completely redesigned twice since its inauguration.

=== New building and merger with NYPL collection ===
The eighty-year-old building was showing its age and in need of major rehabilitation and upgrades. This reality brought the board of trustees to the controversial decision to sell the building and combine the library collection with that of the New York Public Library. The building was sold to one of the tenants in November 2007, and the bulk of the collection was transferred to the Irma and Paul Milstein Division of U.S. History, Local History & Genealogy at the New York Public Library Main Branch in September 2008.

The NYG&B began a new partnership with the NYPL. Co-sponsored programs are held frequently. This arrangement has proved successful for the Society and its membership, and for the NYPL.

In November 2008 the Society purchased a commercial condominium at 36 West 44th Street in the landmark Bar Building and created entirely new private offices on the 7th floor. The architect Peter Pennoyer and designer John Claflin put the finishing touches on the plans. The space was cleared and new, attractive offices, library, and meeting room were constructed.

== Resources ==
=== e-Library ===
Launched in November 2005, the NYG&B eLibrary provides Society members with the ability to remotely access digitized versions of paper manuscripts from the NYG&B Library's collection. The eLibrary was funded by a grant from the Homeland Foundation, as well as the donations of several New York Genealogical and Biographical Society members.

There are currently over forty thousand fully searchable pages of material in the eLibrary database. Content includes cemetery transcriptions, religious records, civil records, family records, vital records as well as the Society's own publication, The New York Genealogical and Biographical Record. Material is continually added to the eLibrary.

In 2015, the eLibrary's platform was moved to Findmypast.com. Members of the NYG&B still have free access to the eLibrary, and they also have free access to the U.S. and Canadian collections on the Findmypast website as a benefit of membership.

=== Library ===
The Society's former collection consisted of more than 80,000 books, some 40,000 manuscripts, and over 25,000 microforms and computer media. The library's major focus was New York State genealogy and local history. For New York's colonial period, the library's resources were unparalleled. Other well represented areas included the New England and Mid-Atlantic. There was also an extensive collection of reference books for beginning genealogists of every background.

The Manuscript Collection, in particular, was a treasure-trove of unpublished material on early New York families. Items consisted of original deeds, wills, etc. as far back as the 16th-century, unpublished genealogies and genealogists' research notes, transcriptions of New York church and cemetery records, genealogical charts, maps, personal diaries, vital records from family bibles, papers of prominent genealogists and historians as well as other relevant genealogical material.

The library was permanently closed on June 1, 2008; all material was donated to the New York Public Library.

=== Portrait collection ===
Shortly after the dedication of the Society's 58th Street building in 1929, plans were made for the artistic enhancement of the building with the use of suitable portraits. Clarence Winthrop Bowen, president of the Society (1907–1931), after whom the third floor gallery was named, and Samuel P. Avery, Jr., art connoisseur, Trustee and Benefactor, raised gifts for a small endowment for this purpose.

Some of the portraits were gifts, while a number were commissioned by the Society or purchased. Fifteen of the works were painted by Frank O. Salisbury (1874–1962), one of the most popular English portrait painters of the twentieth century. Photographs of a number of the paintings have been reproduced in The New York Genealogical and Biographical Record, and citations are given in the catalog as appropriate. The Avery Art and Publication Fund enabled the Society to acquire portraits and publish high quality illustrations in the Record for over fifty years.

In 1992 eight portraits given by the Delafield Family Association were added to the collection.

With the move to smaller quarters the Society is unable to exhibit the entire collection. As a result, those portraits they are unable to exhibit are in storage or given, on loan, to other groups or societies who are able to provide a forum for some of these portraits.

== Publications ==
=== Newsletters and journals ===
Since 1870, the Society has published The New York Genealogical and Biographical Record, which is ranked as one of the leading scholarly genealogical journals. The more than 125 annual volumes contain a vast collection of material relating to New York families of the 17th, 18th and 19th centuries. With four issues per year, the Record continues to publish compiled genealogies, transcripts of New York primary sources, and newly discovered origins of immigrants to New York.

Since 1990, the New York Genealogical and Biographical Society has published The New York Researcher on a quarterly basis. The newsletter describes NYG&B activities and genealogical events of New York interest, as well as feature articles on New York genealogical sources and research techniques and New York-related queries. In 2004, the newsletter was renamed The New York Researcher.

=== Other publications ===
The NYG&B has sponsored the publication of a number of books, including New York church, probate, and naturalization records. Some of these are part of the series known as the Collections of the Society. Recent publications include Voices of the Irish Immigrant: Information Wanted Ads in The Truth Teller, New York City 1825-1844, Minutes of Coroners Proceedings, City and County of New York, John Burnet, Coroner, 1748-1758, Kings County, New York, Administration Proceedings 1817-1856, as well as several others. A complete list of volumes is available through the Society's office, though a truncated list of books published can be found on the NYG&B website.

In 2015, the NYG&B published the New York Family History Research Guide and Gazetteer, an 858-page guide to genealogical research in New York State. The first third of the book contains chapters on the major record groups, published sources, and essential repositories containing New York records. The rest of the book contains guides to all 62 counties of New York State. Each county guide features a map, list of current and historic place names organized by city and town, a description of local repositories, and a bibliography of key printed and online sources.
