= William Denning =

American politician

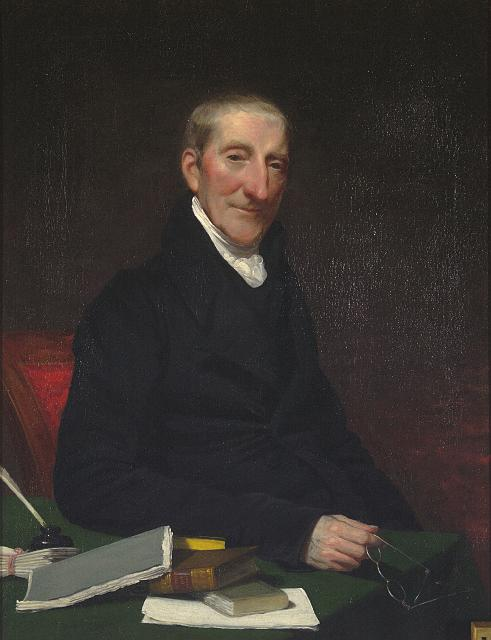
- Portrait of Denning by John Vanderlyn, 1831

Member of the U.S. House of Representatives from New York's 2nd district
- In office March 4, 1809 – 1810 with Gurdon S. Mumford
- Preceded by: Gurdon S. Mumford; George Clinton, Jr.
- Succeeded by: Gurdon S. Mumford; Samuel L. Mitchill

Personal details
- Born: April 1740 St. John's, Newfoundland Colony
- Died: October 30, 1819 (aged 79) New York City, New York, U.S.
- Party: Democratic-Republican
- Spouses: Sarah Hawxhurst (m. 1765; died 1776) Amy Hawxhurst McIntosh (m. 1777; died 1808)
- Relations: William Alexander Duer (son-in-law)
- Children: 9

William Denning (April 1740 – October 30, 1819) was a merchant and United States representative from New York.

== Early life ==
Denning was likely born in St. John's in the Newfoundland Colony in April 1740. As a youth, he moved to New York City in early youth and engaged in mercantile pursuits.

== Career ==
He was a member of the Committee of One Hundred in 1775, was a delegate to the New York Provincial Congress from 1775 to 1777 and was a member of the convention of State representatives in 1776 and 1777. He served in the New York State Assembly from 1784 to 1787 and in the New York State Senate from 1798 to 1808. He was a member of the Council of Appointment in 1799.

Denning was elected as a Democratic-Republican to the 11th United States Congress, beginning on March 4, 1809, but never took his seat, and eventually resigned in 1810.

== Personal life ==
On June 28, 1765, Denning was married to Sarah Hawxhurst (1740–1776). Together, they were the parents of:

- Lucretia Ann Denning (1766–1843), who married Nathaniel Mould Shaler (1747–1817) on June 2, 1787.
- Charles Denning (1767–1768), who died young.
- William Denning (1768–1849), who married Catharine L. Smith (1770–1869), daughter of Thomas Smith, Esq., on November 3, 1794.
- Sally Hawxhurst Denning (1770–1770), who died young.
- Philip Denning (1772–1773), who died young.
- Sarah Denning (1775–1835), who married William Henderson (1767–1825) on June 11, 1798.

After his first wife's death, the next year he married Amy (née Hawxhurst) McIntosh (1747–1808), the younger sister of his first wife and the widow of Phineas McIntosh, a merchant. Together, they were the parents of:

- Amy Amelia Denning (1778–1853), who married James Gillespie, a merchant, on April 20, 1806.
- Hannah Maria Denning (1782–1862), who married William Alexander Duer (1780–1858), the 7th President of Columbia University and son of Col. William Duer, on September 11, 1806.
- Charles Denning (1785–1807), who worked for Minturn and Champlin.

He died in New York City in 1819; interment was in St. Paul's Churchyard.

=== Descendants ===
Through his son William, he was a grandfather of Emily Denning, who married Jacob Rutsen Van Rensselaer, the son of Cornelia De Peyster and Jacob Rutsen Van Rensselaer (1767–1835).

Through his daughter Hannah, he was a grandfather of Denning Duer (1812–1891), who married Caroline King (daughter of James Gore King) and Elizabeth Denning Duer (1821–1900), who married Archibald Gracie King, her elder brother's brother-in-law (both Caroline and Archibald were children of James Gore King).

U.S. House of Representatives
| Preceded by Gurdon S. Mumford, George Clinton, Jr. | Member of the U.S. House of Representatives from New York's 2nd congressional district 1809 – 1810? with Gurdon S. Mumford | Succeeded by Gurdon S. Mumford, Samuel L. Mitchill |
