= James Clinton (soldier) =

American soldier (1667–1718)

- Coat of Arms of James Clinton
- Born: c. 1667; Kingdom of Ireland
- Died: 24 January 1718; County Longford, Kingdom of Ireland
- Occupations: Soldier and Politician
- Spouse: Elizabeth Smith
- Children: 3, including Charles
- Parent(s): William Clinton; Elizabeth Kennedy
- Relatives: James Clinton (grandson); George Clinton (grandson)

James Clinton (c. 1667 – 24 January 1718) sired the American branch of the prominent Clinton family, whose members included George Clinton, the fourth Vice President of the United States, and James Clinton, a major general in the American Revolutionary War.

According to family lore, Clinton was an Anglo-Irish soldier and politician. His name does not appear to be extant in contemporary political papers, or contemporary military documents, and the details of possible military and political careers thus far remain a mystery.

== Early life ==
Clinton was born circa 1667 in Ireland. He was the son of Elizabeth (née Kennedy) Clinton and William Clinton (1614–1684), who is said to have been a royalist officer in the army of Charles I of England (A corresponding army commission for a William Clinton has yet to be located.)

James’ father is alleged to have been a nephew of Thomas Clinton, 3rd Earl of Lincoln and a grandson of Henry Clinton, 2nd Earl of Lincoln (Note: George Clinton, youngest son of the sixth Earl of Lincoln, was a Naval Commander, politician and Colonial administrator. His son, General Sir Henry Clinton was Commander-in-Chief of the British in North America from 1778 to 1782, fighting against James' descendants. Henry's sons, General Sir William Henry Clinton and Lieutenant-General Sir Henry Clinton, were also successful military commanders.) How this family relationship has been deduced is unclear. It was not mentioned by either Charles, George, or Dewitt Clinton; and no William has been identified in the corresponding generation of the family of the Earls of Lincoln who fits the dates attributed to William Clinton, father of James.

After the king's death in 1649, James’ father William went into exile on the Continent for a time before going to Scotland, possibly in support of the heir to the throne, Charles II. While in Scotland he married his mother, Elizabeth Kennedy. His parents subsequently moved to the northern part of Ireland where they had one son, James.

== Legacy ==
James Clinton is reported to have made an unsuccessful attempt to recover his patrimonial estates in England. The location of these estates in England, and the date of Clinton’s suit, is unknown, as no corroborating documents have so far been identified. While there he is said to have married Elizabeth Smith, (d. 1728) the daughter of a New Model Army captain under Cromwell. James returned to Ireland, where he and his wife had three children, two daughters and a son:

- Christiana Clinton (1685–1776), who married John Beatty (1645–1729).
- Mary Clinton
- Charles Clinton (1690–1773), who married Elizabeth Denniston (1701–1779) and had seven children.

In May 1729, his then forty-year-old son Charles left Dublin and emigrated to New Ulster (now Ulster County in New York, United States) in a vessel called the George and Anne. Charles had paid for the passage of 94 people aboard the ship.

=== Descendants ===
Through his daughter Christiana, he was the grandfather of the Rev. Charles Clinton Beatty (1715–1772) and the great-grandfather of Dr. John Beatty (1749–1826), who served as a Continental Congressman as well as the Speaker of the New Jersey General Assembly, Secretary of State of New Jersey, and a U.S. Representative from New Jersey.

Through his only son Charles, he was the grandfather of seven, including Revolutionary War Major General James Clinton (1736–1812) and New York Governor George Clinton (1739–1812), who served as the 4th Vice President of the United States.
