= List of longest-serving United States governors =

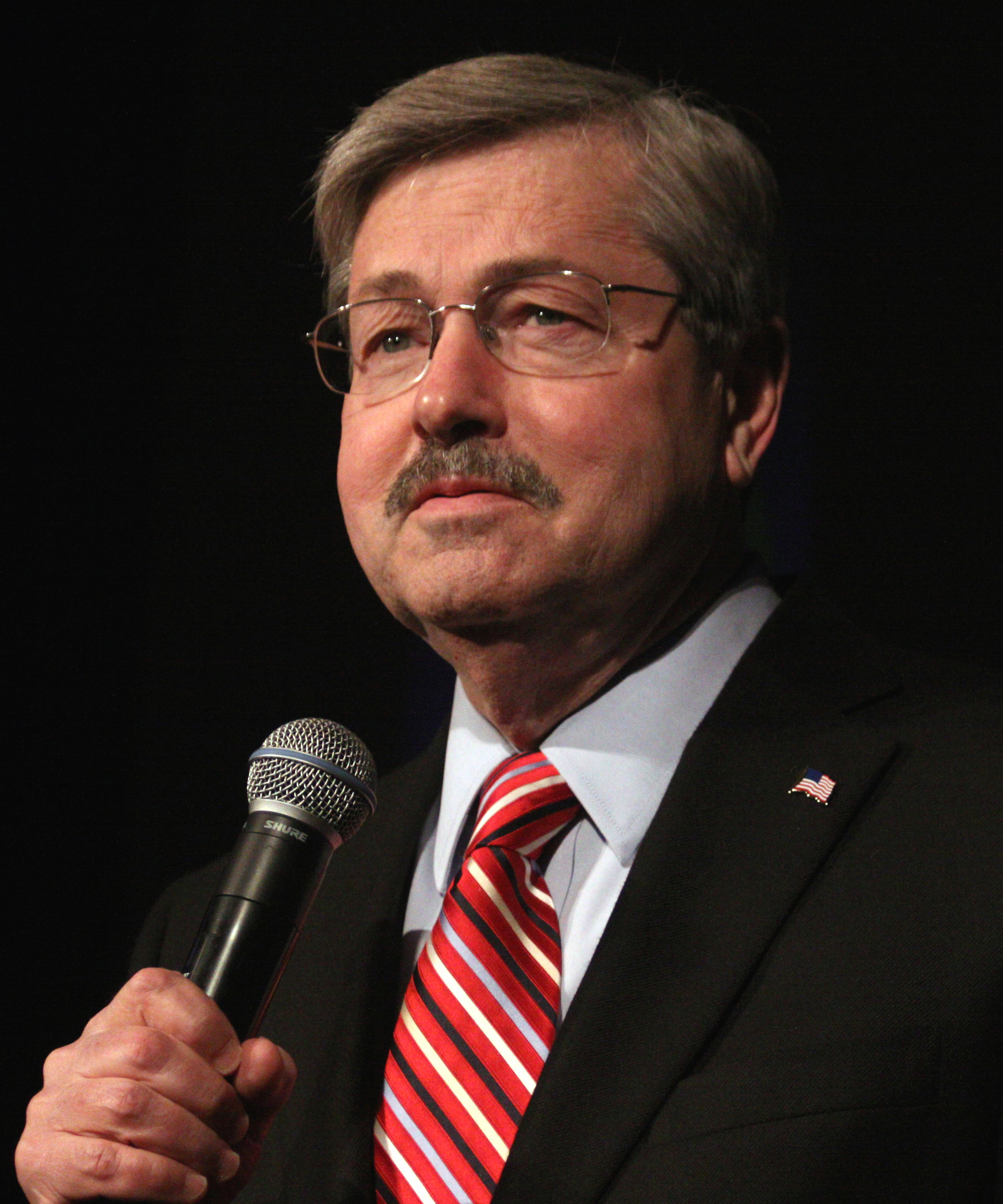
Terry Branstad is the longest-serving governor in American history, with a tenure of 22 years, four months, and 13 days, as governor of Iowa.

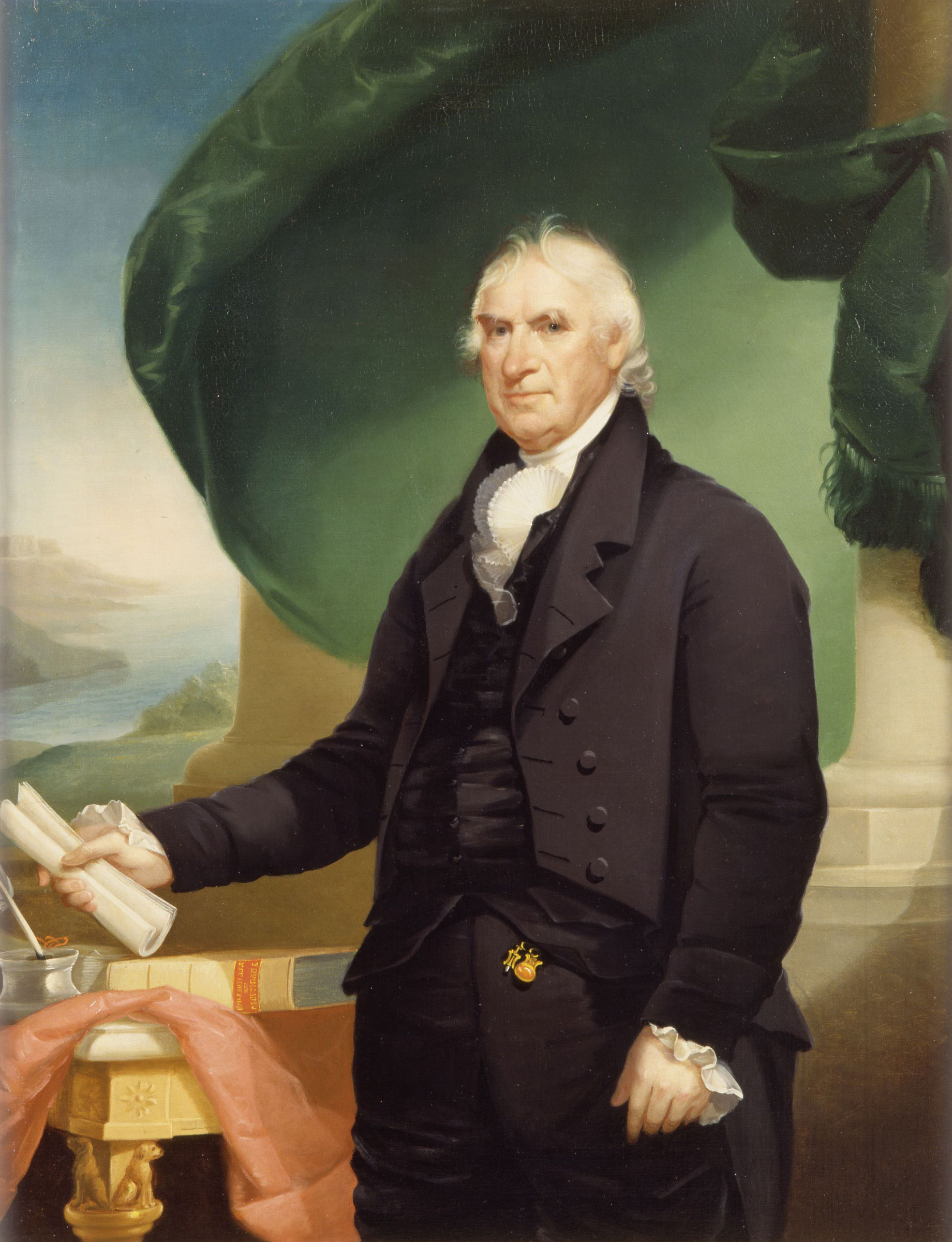
George Clinton is the longest-serving governor in American history from the Democratic-Republican Party, and the second-longest serving governor overall, with a tenure of 20 years, 11 months, and two days, as governor of New York. He remains the longest continuously-serving governor, at 17 years, 11 months, and two days.

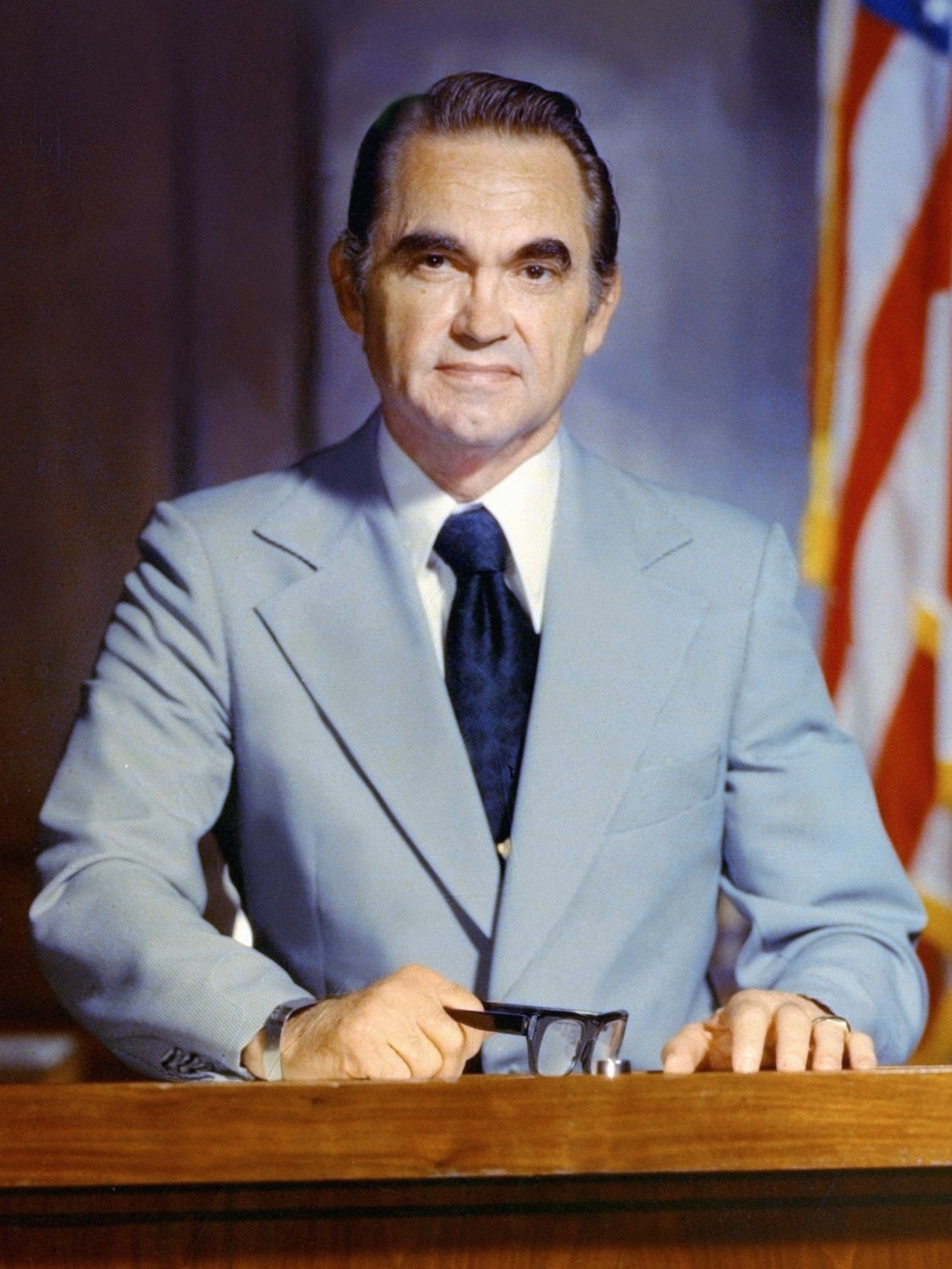
George Wallace is the longest-serving governor in American history from the Democratic Party and the third-longest serving governor overall, with a tenure of 16 years and eight days, as governor of Alabama.

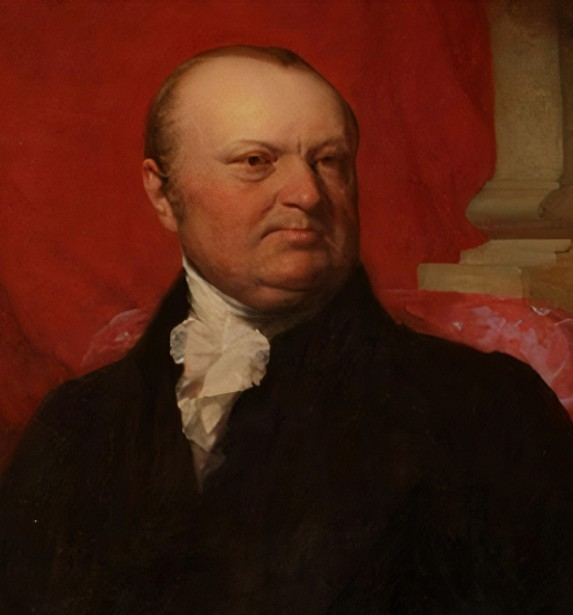
John Taylor Gilman is the longest-serving governor in American history from the Federalist Party, with a tenure of 13 years, 11 months, and 25 days, as governor of New Hampshire.

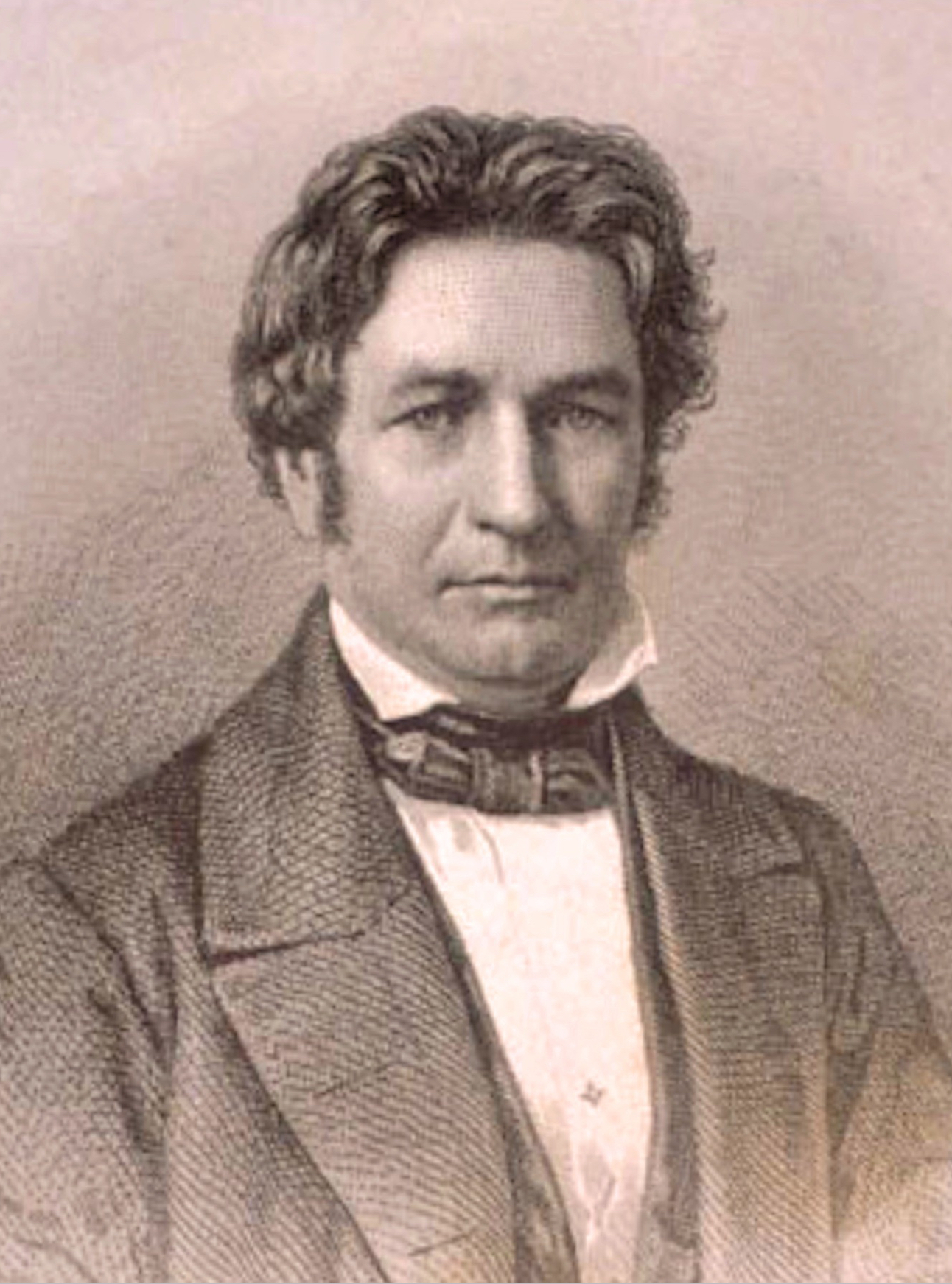
André B. Roman is the longest-serving governor in American history from the Whig Party, with a tenure of 8 years and 1 day, as governor of Louisiana.

This list contains the 50 longest-serving terms for governors of U.S. states, consecutively or otherwise. Pre-statehood territorial and colonial governors are not included.

#	Governor	State	Time in office	Took office	Left office	Party
1	Terry Branstad	Iowa	8,169 days	January 14, 1983	January 15, 1999	Republican
1	Terry Branstad	Iowa	8,169 days	January 14, 2011	May 24, 2017	Republican
2	George Clinton	New York	7,641 days	July 30, 1777	June 30, 1795	Democratic-Republican
2	George Clinton	New York	7,641 days	July 1, 1801	June 30, 1804	Democratic-Republican
3	George Wallace	Alabama	5,848 days	January 14, 1963	January 16, 1967	Democratic
3	George Wallace	Alabama	5,848 days	January 18, 1971	January 15, 1979	Democratic
3	George Wallace	Alabama	5,848 days	January 17, 1983	January 19, 1987	Democratic
4	Jerry Brown	California	5,847 days	January 6, 1975	January 3, 1983	Democratic
4	Jerry Brown	California	5,847 days	January 3, 2011	January 7, 2019	Democratic
4	Bill Janklow	South Dakota	5,847 days	January 1, 1979	January 6, 1987	Republican
4	Bill Janklow	South Dakota	5,847 days	January 7, 1995	January 3, 2003	Republican
6	Jim Rhodes	Ohio	5,840 days	January 14, 1963	January 11, 1971	Republican
6	Jim Rhodes	Ohio	5,840 days	January 13, 1975	January 10, 1983	Republican
6	Jim Hunt	North Carolina	5,840 days	January 8, 1977	January 5, 1985	Democratic
6	Jim Hunt	North Carolina	5,840 days	January 9, 1993	January 6, 2001	Democratic
8	Edwin Edwards	Louisiana	5,784 days	May 9, 1972	March 10, 1980	Democratic
8	Edwin Edwards	Louisiana	5,784 days	March 12, 1984	March 14, 1988	Democratic
8	Edwin Edwards	Louisiana	5,784 days	January 13, 1992	January 8, 1996	Democratic
9	Arthur Fenner	Rhode Island	5,642 days	May 5, 1790	October 15, 1805	Country
10	Albert Ritchie	Maryland	5,475 days	January 14, 1920	January 9, 1935	Democratic
11	Nelson Rockefeller	New York	5,466 days	January 1, 1959	December 18, 1973	Republican
12	Rick Perry	Texas	5,144 days	December 21, 2000	January 20, 2015	Republican
13	Tommy Thompson	Wisconsin	5,142 days	January 5, 1987	February 1, 2001	Republican
14	Cecil Andrus	Idaho	5,132 days	January 4, 1971	January 23, 1977	Democratic
14	Cecil Andrus	Idaho	5,132 days	January 5, 1987	January 2, 1995	Democratic
15	John Taylor Gilman	New Hampshire	5,119 days	June 5, 1794	June 6, 1805	Federalist
15	John Taylor Gilman	New Hampshire	5,119 days	June 3, 1813	June 6, 1816	Federalist
16	Jim Thompson	Illinois	5,118 days	January 10, 1977	January 14, 1991	Republican
17	Robert D. Ray	Iowa	5,112 days	January 16, 1969	January 14, 1983	Republican
18	William Milliken	Michigan	5,093 days	January 22, 1969	January 1, 1983	Republican
19	George W. P. Hunt	Arizona	5,090 days	February 14, 1912	January 1, 1917	Democratic
19	George W. P. Hunt	Arizona	5,090 days	December 25, 1917	January 6, 1919	Democratic
19	George W. P. Hunt	Arizona	5,090 days	January 1, 1923	January 7, 1929	Democratic
19	George W. P. Hunt	Arizona	5,090 days	January 5, 1931	January 2, 1933	Democratic
20	William Livingston	New Jersey	5,077 days	August 31, 1776	July 25, 1790	Federalist
21	James Fenner	Rhode Island	4,749 days	May 6, 1807	May 1, 1811	Democratic-Republican, Law and Order
21	James Fenner	Rhode Island	4,749 days	May 5, 1824	May 4, 1831	Democratic-Republican, Law and Order
21	James Fenner	Rhode Island	4,749 days	May 2, 1843	May 6, 1845	Democratic-Republican, Law and Order
22	Isaac Halstead Williamson	New Jersey	4,650 days	February 6, 1817	October 30, 1829	Democratic-Republican
23	John Kitzhaber	Oregon	4,428 days	January 9, 1995	January 13, 2003	Democratic
23	John Kitzhaber	Oregon	4,428 days	January 10, 2011	February 18, 2015	Democratic
24	William Carroll	Tennessee	4,395 days	October 1, 1821	October 1, 1827	Democratic-Republican, Democratic
24	William Carroll	Tennessee	4,395 days	October 1, 1829	October 12, 1835	Democratic-Republican, Democratic
25	Arch A. Moore Jr.	West Virginia	4,391 days	January 13, 1969	January 17, 1977	Republican
25	Arch A. Moore Jr.	West Virginia	4,391 days	January 14, 1985	January 16, 1989	Republican
26	Butch Otter	Idaho	4,390 days	January 1, 2007	January 7, 2019	Republican
27	Bruce King	New Mexico	4,386 days	January 1, 1971	January 1, 1975	Democratic
27	Bruce King	New Mexico	4,386 days	January 1, 1979	January 1, 1983	Democratic
27	Bruce King	New Mexico	4,386 days	January 1, 1991	January 1, 1995	Democratic
28	Arthur B. Langlie	Washington	4,384 days	January 15, 1941	January 10, 1945	Republican
28	Arthur B. Langlie	Washington	4,384 days	January 12, 1949	January 16, 1957	Republican
28	G. Mennen Williams	Michigan	4,384 days	January 1, 1949	January 1, 1961	Democratic
28	Michael Dukakis	Massachusetts	4,384 days	January 2, 1975	January 4, 1979	Democratic
28	Michael Dukakis	Massachusetts	4,384 days	January 6, 1983	January 3, 1991	Democratic
28	John Engler	Michigan	4,384 days	January 1, 1991	January 1, 2003	Republican
32	Thomas E. Dewey	New York	4,383 days	January 1, 1943	December 31, 1954	Republican
32	Robert E. Smylie	Idaho	4,383 days	January 3, 1955	January 2, 1967	Republican
32	Orval Faubus	Arkansas	4,383 days	January 11, 1955	January 10, 1967	Democratic
32	John A. Burns	Hawaii	4,383 days	December 3, 1962	December 2, 1974	Democratic
32	Cal Rampton	Utah	4,383 days	January 4, 1965	January 3, 1977	Democratic
32	Daniel J. Evans	Washington	4,383 days	January 13, 1965	January 12, 1977	Republican
32	George Ariyoshi	Hawaii	4,383 days	December 2, 1974	December 1, 1986	Democratic
32	Edgar Herschler	Wyoming	4,383 days	January 6, 1975	January 5, 1987	Democratic
32	Richard Lamm	Colorado	4,383 days	January 14, 1975	January 13, 1987	Democratic
32	Mario Cuomo	New York	4,383 days	January 1, 1983	December 31, 1994	Democratic
32	Roy Romer	Colorado	4,383 days	January 13, 1987	January 12, 1999	Democratic
32	George Pataki	New York	4,383 days	January 1, 1995	December 31, 2006	Republican
32	Jay Inslee	Washington	4,383 days	January 16, 2013	January 15, 2025	Democratic
45	William L. Guy	North Dakota	4,382 days	January 4, 1961	January 2, 1973	Democratic–Nonpartisan League
46	Bill Clinton	Arkansas	4,366 days	January 9, 1979	January 19, 1981	Democratic
46	Bill Clinton	Arkansas	4,366 days	January 11, 1983	December 12, 1992	Democratic
47	William A. Egan	Alaska	4,351 days	January 3, 1959	December 5, 1966	Democratic
47	William A. Egan	Alaska	4,351 days	December 7, 1970	December 2, 1974	Democratic
48	Greg Abbott	Texas	4,308 days	January 20, 2015	incumbent	Republican
49	John Marshall Stone	Mississippi	4,305 days	March 29, 1876	January 2, 1882	Democratic
49	John Marshall Stone	Mississippi	4,305 days	January 13, 1890	January 20, 1896	Democratic
50	Jonathan Trumbull Jr.	Connecticut	4,267 days	December 1, 1797	August 7, 1809	Federalist
