= Samuel L. Mitchill =

American politician (1764–1831)

Samuel Latham Mitchill
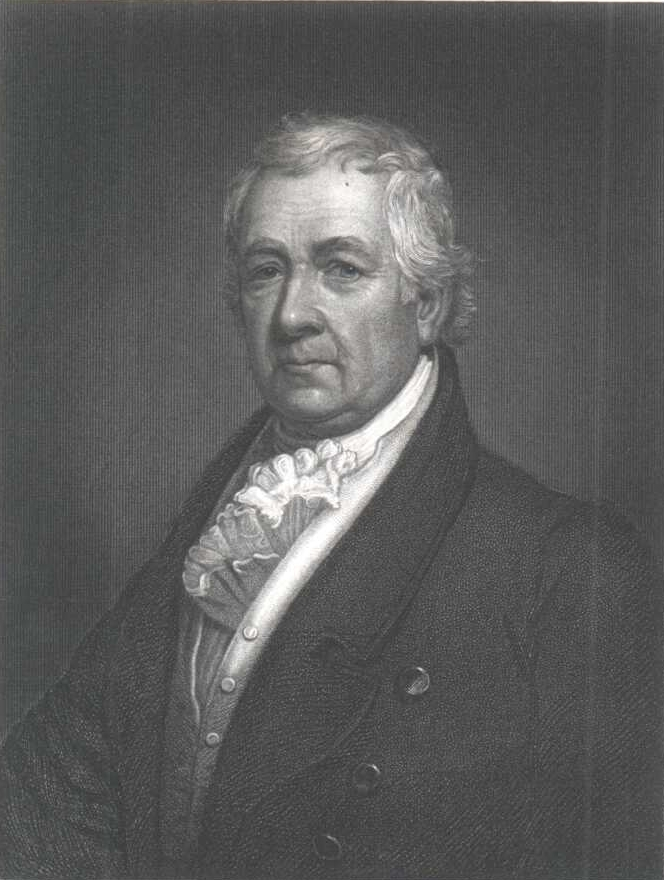

United States Senator from New York
- In office November 23, 1804 – March 4, 1809
- Preceded by: John Armstrong, Jr.
- Succeeded by: Obadiah German

Member of the U.S. House of Representatives from New York
- In office December 4, 1810 – March 3, 1813
- Preceded by: William Denning; Gurdon S. Mumford
- Succeeded by: Jotham Post, Jr. Egbert Benson
- Constituency: 2nd district
- In office March 4, 1801 – November 22, 1804
- Preceded by: Edward Livingston
- Succeeded by: George Clinton, Jr.
- Constituency: 2nd district (1801–03); 3rd district (1803–04)

Personal details
- Born: August 20, 1764 Hempstead, Province of New York, British America
- Died: September 7, 1831 (aged 67) New York City, New York, U.S.
- Party: Democratic-Republican

Samuel Latham Mitchill (August 20, 1764 – September 7, 1831) was an American medical doctor, naturalist, politician, and public gadfly (see Personality), who lived in Plandome, New York.

== Early life ==
Samuel Mitchill was born in Hempstead in the Province of New York, the son of Robert Mitchill and his wife, Mary Latham, both Quakers.

He was sent to Scotland and graduated in 1786 from the University of Edinburgh Medical School with an MD, his education being paid for by a wealthy uncle. Returning to the United States after medical school, Mitchill also completed law school. As a lawyer, he oversaw the purchase of lands in western New York from the Iroquois Indians in 1788.

== Career ==
Mitchill taught chemistry, botany, and natural history at Columbia College from 1792 to 1801 and was a founding editor of The Medical Repository, the first medical journal in the United States. In 1793, he was elected a Foreign Fellow of the Royal Society of Edinburgh. His proposers were James Gregory, Dugald Stewart, and John Rotherham.

In addition to his Columbia lectures on botany, zoology, and mineralogy, Mitchill collected, identified, and classified many plants and animals, particularly aquatic organisms. He was elected a Fellow of the American Academy of Arts and Sciences in 1797. From 1807 to 1826, he taught at the College of Physicians and Surgeons of New York and then helped organize the short-lived Rutgers Medical College of New Jersey, for which he served as vice president until 1830. While at Columbia, Mitchill developed a fallacious theory of disease, but it resulted in his promotion of personal hygiene and improved sanitation.

Mitchill served in the New York State Assembly in 1791 and again in 1798 and was then elected as a Democratic-Republican to the United States House of Representatives, serving from 1801 until his resignation on November 22, 1804. As a congressman, he was one of the impeachment managers, who in the impeachment trial, successfully prosecuted the articles of impeachment adopted by the House against Judge John Pickering. In November 1804, Mitchill was elected a U.S. Senator from New York to fill the vacancy caused by the resignation of John Armstrong, and served from November 23, 1804, to March 4, 1809. He then served again in the House of Representatives from December 4, 1810, to March 4, 1813.

Mitchill was elected a member of the American Antiquarian Society in 1814. On January 29, 1817, Mitchill convened the first meeting of the New York Academy of Sciences, originally called the Lyceum of Natural History, of which he was later elected president.

Mitchill strongly endorsed the building of the Erie Canal, sponsored by his friend and political ally DeWitt Clinton; they were both members of the short-lived New-York Institution.

Mitchill suggested renaming the United States of America to Fredonia, combining the English "freedom" with a Latinate ending. Although the suggestion was not seriously considered, some towns adopted the name, including Fredonia, New York. Some freebooters established a short-lived republic under that name in Texas in the late 1820s.

The earliest recorded argument in its favor is found in a broadside, printed probably in 1803, with the title Generic Names for the Country and People of the United States of America. The text refers to its “authors” who “are citizens of the United States, and are zealous for their prosperity, honour, and reputation. They wish them to possess a name among the nations of the earth. They lament that hitherto and at present the country is destitute of one.” The piece is signed, and some of the phrases used match those in later writings known to be Mitchill’s, so this 1803 broadside is also ascribed to him. It is impossible to tell if there really was a group for whom Mitchill was writing, or if that was merely a pious fiction.

== Personality ==
Samuel L. Mitchill and Thomas Jefferson were letter correspondents.

Mitchill was a man of "irrepressible energies... polyglot enthusiasms... [and] distinguished eccentricities" who was not "a man afraid to speak out loud about the loves of plants and animals; indeed, he was not a man afraid to speak out loud on most any topic. In the early nineteenth century, Mitchill was New York's "most publicly universal gentleman... a man known variously as the 'living encyclopedia,' as a 'stalking library,' and (to his admired Jefferson) as the 'Congressional Dictionary.'" "Once described as a 'chaos of knowledge,' Mitchill was generally more admired for his encyclopedic breadth of understanding than for much originality of thought." As a personality, he was affable but also egotistical and pedantic. Mitchill enjoyed popularizing scientific knowledge and promoting practical applications of scientific inquiry.

== Published works ==
- Mitchill, S. L. 1818. Description of three species of fish. Journal of the Academy of Natural Sciences of Philadelphia 1, 407–412. (BHL link)

== Taxon described by him ==
- See Category:Taxa named by Samuel L. Mitchill

== Taxon named in his honor ==
The Bay Anchovy, Anchoa mitchilli Valenciennes, 1848 was named after him.

U.S. House of Representatives
Preceded by Edward Livingston	Member of the U.S. House of Representatives from New York's 2nd congressional district 1801–1803	Succeeded by Joshua Sands
Preceded by Philip Van Cortlandt	Member of the U.S. House of Representatives from New York's 3rd congressional district 1803–1804	Succeeded by George Clinton, Jr.
U.S. Senate
Preceded by John Armstrong, Jr.	U.S. senator (Class 1) from New York; 1804–1809; Served alongside: John Smith	Succeeded by Obadiah German
U.S. House of Representatives
Preceded by William Denning, Gurdon S. Mumford	Member of the U.S. House of Representatives from New York's 2nd congressional district 1810–1813 with Gurdon S. Mumford and William Paulding, Jr.	Succeeded by Jotham Post, Jr., Egbert Benson
