= Christopher Marshall =

Christopher or Chris Marshall may refer to:

- Christopher Marshall (revolutionary) (1709–1797), Irish-born leader in the American Revolution
- Christopher Marshall (medical scientist) (1949–2015), British cancer biologist
- Christopher Marshall (composer) (born 1956), New Zealand classical music composer
- Chris Marshall (DJ) (born 1991), American DJ and producer better known by his stage name Crizzly
- Chris Marshall (American football) (born 2003), American college football wide receiver

== See also ==
- Kris Marshall (born 1973), English actor
