= Anthony Stockholm =

Anthony Stockholm was the first president of the New York Stock Exchange from 1817 to 1818.

The origin of the NYSE can be traced to May 17, 1792, when the Buttonwood Agreement was signed by 24 stock brokers outside of 68 Wall Street in New York under a buttonwood tree on Wall Street which earlier was the site of a stockade fence. On March 8, 1817, the organization drafted a constitution and renamed itself the "New York Stock & Exchange Board" (this name was shortened to its current form in 1863). Anthony Stockholm was elected the Exchange's first president.
