= Little Britain, New York =

Area of New York, United States

Coordinates: 41°28′40″N 74°07′47″W

Little Britain is an area in the town of New Windsor, Orange County, New York, United States, south of and adjacent to Stewart International Airport. The name spread to the surrounding region, which at that time was part of Ulster County.

== History ==
The area of Little Britain was part of a patent issued to Andrew Johnston on July 19, 1719 for 2,000 acres. It was first settled circa 1724 by John Humphrey, who purchased a farm lot of 250 acres. Peter Mullinder purchased a farm in 1729; the following month Robert Burnet of Scotland, by way of Raritan, New Jersey and John Reid also bought land.

Charles Clinton was a native of County Longford, Ireland, who espoused Jacobite sympathies. Having persuaded a number of his friends and relatives to join him, he left Ireland and arrived at Little Britain in 1731. Among those who accompanied him were William Borland, Alexander Denniston, Thomas Dunlap, Robert Frazer, William Hamilton, and George Lille. Clinton became a judge of the court of common pleas.

In 1770, Little Britain was designated a road district for the purpose of maintenance. Little Britain Road was one of the first roads in the town.

In 1737, there being but few children in the settlement, Little Britain had no schoolmaster, but around 1751 the Rev. John Moffat, pastor of Goodwill Church, having succeeded John McNeil, opened "Moffat's Academy", which was located in a house on a farm owned by Robert Shaw, on the road from Little Britain to Washingtonville. By 1814, the Little Britain Meetinghouse school district was established.

The first post office in the town was established at Little Britain on May 29, 1824. Hamilton Morrison was postmaster.

Little Britain was the birthplace of New York Governor DeWitt Clinton, his father General James Clinton and his uncle U.S. Vice President George Clinton.

Today it lends its name to Little Britain Elementary School, part of the Washingtonville school district. The Little Britain Grange hall also still stands near the intersection of NY 207 and NY 747.
