= The New York Genealogical and Biographical Record =

The New York Genealogical and Biographical Record is a scholarly publication devoted to the interests of American genealogy and biography. It is published on a quarterly basis by The New York Genealogical and Biographical Society.

== History ==
Since its inception in 1870, The New York Genealogical and Biographical Record has been a source for genealogists, historians and biographers researching New Yorkers and their families. It is issued in the months of January, April, July and October. The content of the journal has always centered on compiled genealogies of families residing in New York State as well as adjacent areas; genealogical source material such as church registers, will and deed abstracts, newspaper extracts, muster rolls, census records, and family records such as those found in Bibles; and book reviews, library accession lists, and proceedings of the NYG&B Society.

== See also ==
The first volume, published in 1870.

- New York Genealogical and Biographical Society
