= James Clinton =

Continental Army officer (1736–1812)

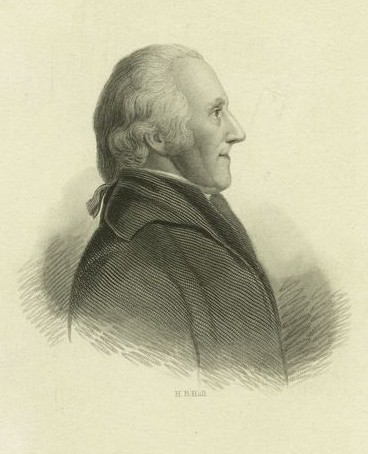
- 1861 sketch of Clinton
- Born: August 9, 1736; Little Britain, Province of New York
- Died: September 22, 1812 (aged 76); Little Britain, New York, United States
- Spouses: Mary DeWitt (m. 1765; died 1795): Mary Gray
- Children: 13, including DeWitt, George, James
- Parent(s): Col. Charles Clinton; Elizabeth Denniston
- Relatives: George Clinton (brother); William W Clinton (great-grandfather); James Clinton (grandfather); George W. Clinton (grandson); Ambrose Spencer (son-in-law)

Major General James Clinton (August 9, 1736 – September 22, 1812) was a Continental Army officer and politician who fought in the American Revolutionary War.

During the war he, along with John Sullivan, led the 1779 Sullivan Expedition against the British-allied Haudenosaunee. The Americans destroyed 40 villages as well as their winter stores of wheat and other produce. This forced 5,000 Haudenosaunee to flee to British controlled Fort Niagara and caused the deaths of several hundred Haudenosaunee during the harsh winter of 1779–1780. He subsequently obtained the rank of brevet major general.

After leaving the army, Clinton was a founding member of the New York Society of the Cincinnati and served as an assemblyman in the New York State legislature and later as a New York State Senator from 1788 to 1792.

== Early life ==
Coat of Arms of James Clinton

Clinton was born in Ulster County in the colony of New York, at Little Britain in the town of New Windsor, now part of Orange County, New York. He was the third son of Col. Charles Clinton, an Anglo-Irish colonist and a colonel in the French and Indian War who immigrated to New Ulster in 1729, and his wife Elizabeth Denniston.

He was the brother of George Clinton, who was elected and served as Governor of New York from 1777 to 1795 and as U.S. Vice President from 1805 to 1812, and the father of DeWitt Clinton, who would also serve as Governor of New York. He was the grandson of James Clinton (d. 1718), and the great-grandson of William Clinton (1614–1684), a Royalist officer in the army of Charles I of England.

== Career ==
=== French and Indian War ===
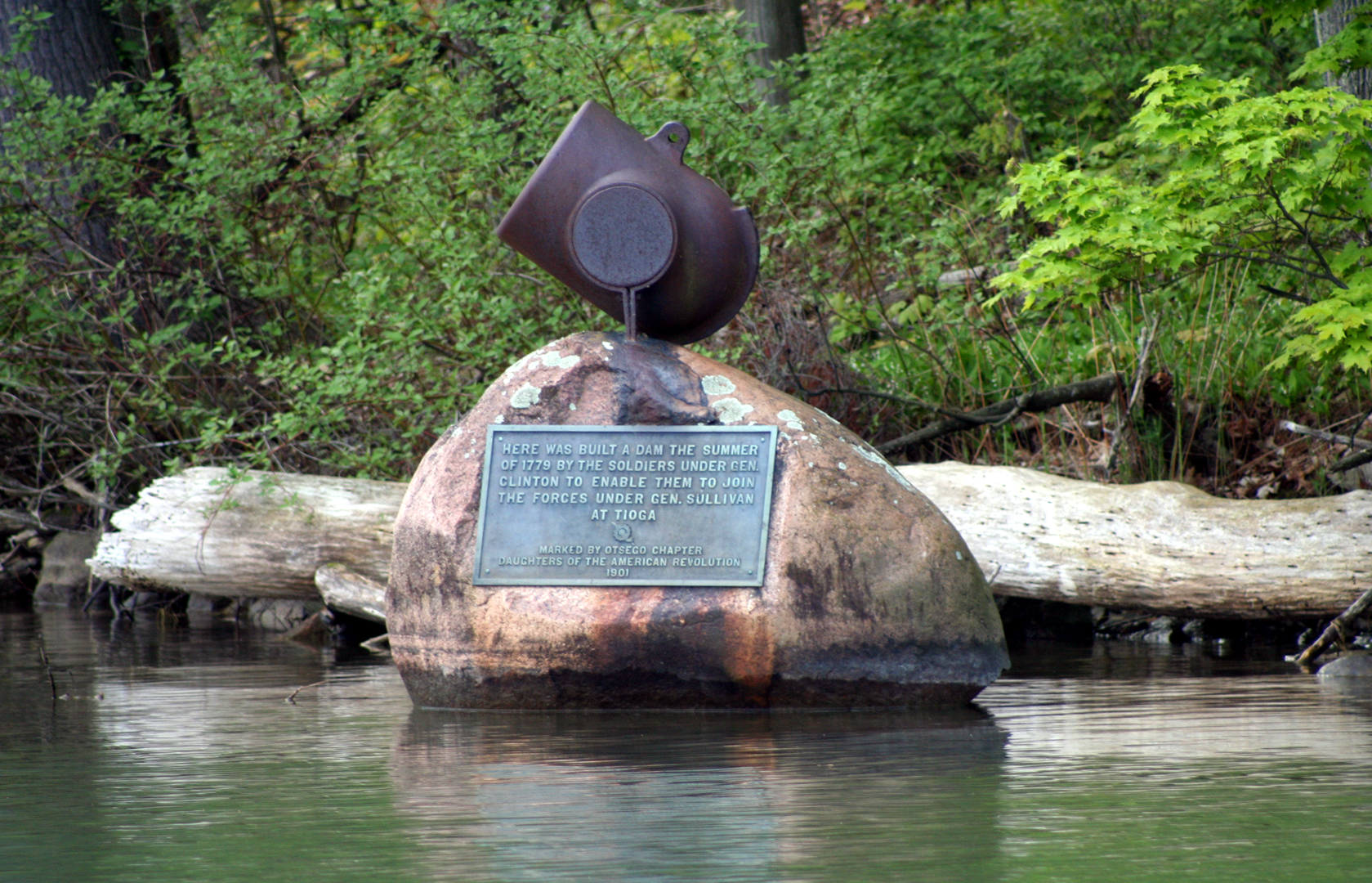
Monument at the site of Gen. Clinton's dam at the source of the Susquehanna River on Otsego Lake in Cooperstown, New York

James Clinton's military experience began in the French and Indian War (the North American front of the Seven Years' War), where he served in the provincial troops of New York in the British cause. He was commissioned an ensign in 1757 and achieved the rank of captain in the New York Regiment in 1759. Commanding a company in 1758, he participated, along with his father (Colonel) and brother George (Lieutenant), in General John Bradstreet’s capture of Fort Frontenac (now Kingston, Ontario). He and his brother played a key role in capturing a French vessel.

Clinton remained in the army, and was stationed at various frontier posts. In 1763 he raised and commanded a corps of two hundred men, who were designated as "Guards of the Frontier". After the war, he retired and married Mary De Witt.

=== American Revolutionary War ===
A month after the first open armed conflict in Lexington, the Continental Congress resolved on May 25, 1775, to build fortifications in the Hudson highlands for the purpose of protecting and maintaining control of the Hudson River. Clinton and Major Christopher Tappen, lifetime residents of the area, were sent to scout appropriate locations. Clinton was commissioned as colonel of the 3rd New York Regiment, which took part in Brig. Gen. Richard Montgomery’s unsuccessful expedition to Quebec in 1775. In March 1776, Clinton took command of the 2nd New York Regiment and soon after, in August, was promoted to brigadier general in the Continental Army.

He served most of the war in the Northern Department, along the New York frontier. During the Saratoga Campaign in 1777, he commanded Fort Clinton in the Hudson Highlands. He participated in a successful effort to prevent British General Sir Henry Clinton from rescuing General John Burgoyne at Saratoga, but he and his troops were unable to hold Forts Clinton and Montgomery. Clinton sustained a bayonet wound in the leg during the assault. In 1778 he was stationed in Albany to oppose Indian and Tory forces.

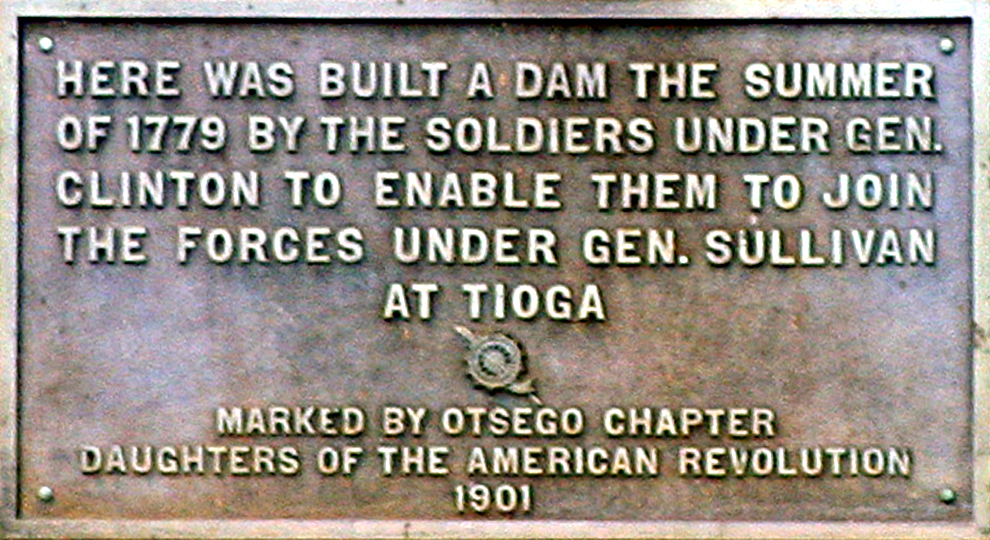
Plaque on the Monument at the site of Gen. Clinton's dam

In 1779, Clinton led an expedition down the Susquehanna River after making the upper portion navigable by damming up the river's source at Otsego Lake, allowing the lake's level to rise, and then destroying the dam and flooding the river for miles downstream. This event is described by James Fenimore Cooper in the introduction to his popular novel The Pioneers (1823). It is commemorated by an annual Memorial Day canoe race.

At Tioga, New York, Clinton met up with General John Sullivan's forces, who had marched from Easton, Pennsylvania. Together, on August 29, they defeated the Tories and British-allied Haudenosaunee at the Battle of Newtown (near today's city of Elmira, New York). This became known as the "Sullivan-Clinton Campaign" or the "Sullivan Expedition." They also attacked Haudenosaunee villages throughout western New York, destroying 40 as well as the winter stores of the people. Around 5,000 Haudenosaunee fled to British controlled Niagara and mortality was high that winter because of starvation with several hundred deaths.

In 1780, Clinton temporarily commanded the Northern Department. By October 1781, his brigade had joined George Washington's army in the siege of Yorktown.

=== Post-war years ===
After leaving he army, Clinton served on the commission defining the New York-Pennsylvania boundary. In 1783 General Clinton became an original member of the New York Society of the Cincinnati. He entered state politics, serving as an assemblyman in the New York State legislature from 1787 to 1788 and again from 1800 to 1801, and as a New York State Senator from 1788 to 1792.

== Personal life ==
On February 18, 1765, James Clinton married Mary DeWitt (1737–1795), the only daughter of Egbert DeWitt, members of a colonial Dutch family. They had seven children, including:

- Alexander Clinton (1765–1787), who served in Colonel Lamb's regiment during the Revolution and drowned in the Hudson River
- Charles Clinton (1767–1829), who married Elizabeth Mulliner (1770–1865)
- DeWitt Clinton (1769–1828), a politician and later governor of New York
- George Clinton, Jr. (1771–1809), politician who served as a U.S. representative in Congress
- Mary Clinton (1773–1808), who married Robert Burrage Norton. After his death, she married Judge Ambrose Spencer (1765–1848).
- Elizabeth Clinton (1776–1832), who married William Stuart
- Katharine Clinton (1778–1837), who married Samuel Lake Norton, brother to her sister Mary's husband. After his death, she married Ambrose Spencer, her sister's widower.

His second wife was Mary (née Little) Gray (1768–1835), the widow of Alexander Gray (1762–1795), who was born in Ireland. Together, James and Mary were the parents of six children:

- James G. Clinton, who died young.
- Caroline Hannah Clinton (1800–1864), who married Charles Augustus Dewey (1793–1866), an Associate Justice of the Massachusetts Supreme Judicial Court
- Emma Little Clinton (1802–1823), who never married.
- James Graham Clinton (1804–1849), who married Margaret Ellsworth Conger and served in Congress.
- Letitia Clinton (1806–1842), who married Dr. Francis Bolton (1804–1849).
- Anna Clinton (1809–1833), who married Lt. Edward Ross.

Clinton died in Little Britain, New York, on September 22, 1812, the same year as his brother George.

=== Descendants ===
Through his son DeWitt, he was the grandfather of ten, including George William Clinton (1807–1885) who served as Mayor of Buffalo, New York from 1842 to 1843. Through his son George, he was the grandfather of three.
