= George Clinton (vice president) =

Vice President of the United States from 1805 to 1812

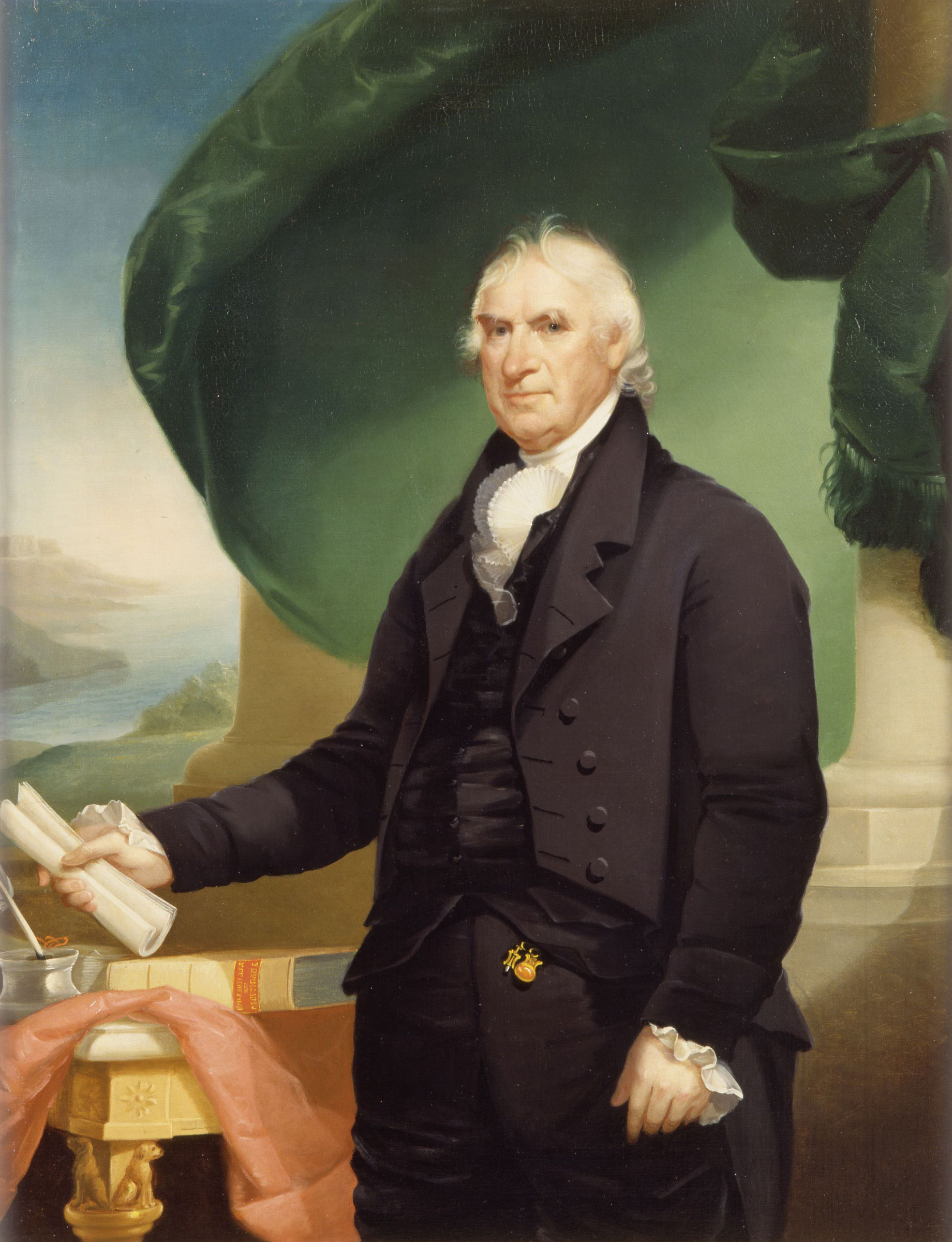
- Posthumous portrait by Ezra Ames, 1814

4th Vice President of the United States
- In office March 4, 1805 – April 20, 1812
- President: Thomas Jefferson (1805–1809); James Madison (1809–1812)
- Preceded by: Aaron Burr
- Succeeded by: Elbridge Gerry

1st Governor of New York
- In office July 1, 1801 – June 30, 1804
- Lieutenant: Jeremiah Van Rensselaer
- Preceded by: John Jay
- Succeeded by: Morgan Lewis
- In office July 30, 1777 – June 30, 1795
- Lieutenant: Pierre Van Cortlandt
- Preceded by: Office established (Note: Andrew Elliot (as acting British governor))
- Succeeded by: John Jay

Delegate to the Continental Congress from New York
- In office May 15, 1775 – July 8, 1776

Member of the New York General Assembly from Ulster County
- In office 1768–1775

Acting President of Columbia University
- In office 1784–1787
- Preceded by: Benjamin Moore (acting)
- Succeeded by: William Samuel Johnson

Personal details
- Born: 26 July [O.S. 15 July] 1739 Little Britain, Province of New York, British America
- Died: April 20, 1812 (aged 72) Washington, D.C., U.S.
- Resting place: Old Dutch Churchyard, Kingston, New York, U.S.
- Party: Democratic-Republican
- Spouse: Cornelia Tappen (m. 1770; died 1800)
- Children: Catharine; Cornelia; George; Elizabeth; Martha; Maria
- Parent(s): Charles Clinton (father); Elizabeth Denniston (mother)

Military service
- Allegiance: Kingdom of Great Britain; United States
- Branch/service: (Kingdom of Great Britain) Privateer (GB); British Army (GB); Continental Army (US)
- Rank: Lieutenant (GB); Brigadier general (US)
- Unit: Defiance
- Battles/wars: French and Indian War; Battle of Fort Frontenac; American Revolutionary War

George Clinton (26 July [O.S. 15 July] 1739 – April 20, 1812) was an American soldier, statesman, and a prominent Democratic-Republican in the formative years of the United States. Clinton served as the fourth vice president during the second term of Thomas Jefferson's presidency and the first term of James Madison's presidency from 1805 until his death in 1812. He also served as the first governor of New York from 1777 to 1795 and again from 1801 to 1804; his tenure makes him the second-longest-serving governor in U.S. history. Clinton was the first vice president to die in office and the first to die at all. He was also the first of two vice presidents to serve under two different presidents. (Note: John C. Calhoun, who served under John Quincy Adams and Andrew Jackson, is the only other vice president to hold office under two consecutive presidents.)

Born in the Province of New York on July 26, 1739, Clinton served in the French and Indian War, rising to the rank of lieutenant in the colonial militia. He began a legal practice after the war and served as a district attorney for New York City. Then he became a Member of the New York State Assembly from 1768 to 1775. He became Governor of New York in 1777 and remained in that office until 1795. Clinton supported the cause of independence during the American Revolutionary War and served in the Continental Army despite his gubernatorial position. During and after the war, Clinton was an opponent of Vermont's entrance into the Union on account of disputes over land claims.

Clinton became the longest continuously serving governor in US history, with a tenure of 17 years, 11 months, and two days from 1777 to 1795. He opposed the ratification of the United States Constitution, became a prominent Anti-Federalist, and advocated for the addition of the United States Bill of Rights. In the early 1790s, he emerged as a leader of the incipient Democratic-Republican Party, serving as the party's vice presidential candidate in the 1792 presidential election. Clinton received the third most electoral votes in the election, as President George Washington and Vice President John Adams both won re-election. Clinton did not seek re-election in 1795, but returned to the governorship from 1801 to 1804. With a total tenure of 20 years, 11 months, and two days, Clinton was the longest-serving governor in U.S. history until 2015. (Note: Governor of Iowa Terry Branstad surpassed Clinton's record in 2015.)

Clinton was picked again as the Democratic-Republican vice-presidential nominee in the 1804 election, as President Thomas Jefferson dumped Aaron Burr from the ticket. Clinton sought his party's presidential nomination in the 1808 election, but the party's congressional nominating caucus instead nominated James Madison. Despite his opposition to Madison, Clinton was re-elected as vice president. Clinton died on April 20, 1812, of a heart attack, leaving the office of vice president vacant for the first time in U.S. history. Clinton's nephew, DeWitt Clinton, continued the Clinton New York political dynasty after his uncle's death.

== Early life ==
Clinton was born in 1739 in Little Britain, province of New York. His parents were Anglo-Irish Colonel Charles Clinton (1690–1773) and Elizabeth Denniston Clinton (1701–1779), who had left County Longford, Ireland, in 1729 to escape the Penal Laws, a series of laws passed by the Irish Parliament designed to force nonconformists and Catholics to accept the Anglican Church of Ireland. His political interests were inspired by his father, who was a farmer, surveyor, and land speculator, and served as a member of the New York colonial assembly. George Clinton was the brother of General James Clinton and the uncle of New York's future governor, DeWitt Clinton. George was tutored by a local Scottish clergyman.

== Early career ==
=== French and Indian War service ===
During the French and Indian War, he first served on the privateer Defiance operating in the Caribbean, before enlisting in the provincial militia, where his father held the rank of Colonel. During the French and Indian War George rose to the rank of Lieutenant, accompanying his father in 1758 on Bradstreet's 1758 seizure of Fort Frontenac, cutting one of the major communication and supply lines between the eastern centers of Montreal and Quebec City and France's western territories. He and his brother James were instrumental in capturing a French vessel.

=== Starting a political career ===
Coat of Arms of George Clinton

His father's survey of the New York frontier so impressed the provincial governor (also named George Clinton, and "a distant relative") that he was offered a position as sheriff of New York City and the surrounding county in 1748. After the elder Clinton declined the honor, the governor later designated George as successor to the Clerk of the Ulster County Court of Common Pleas, a position he would assume in 1759 and hold for the next 52 years.

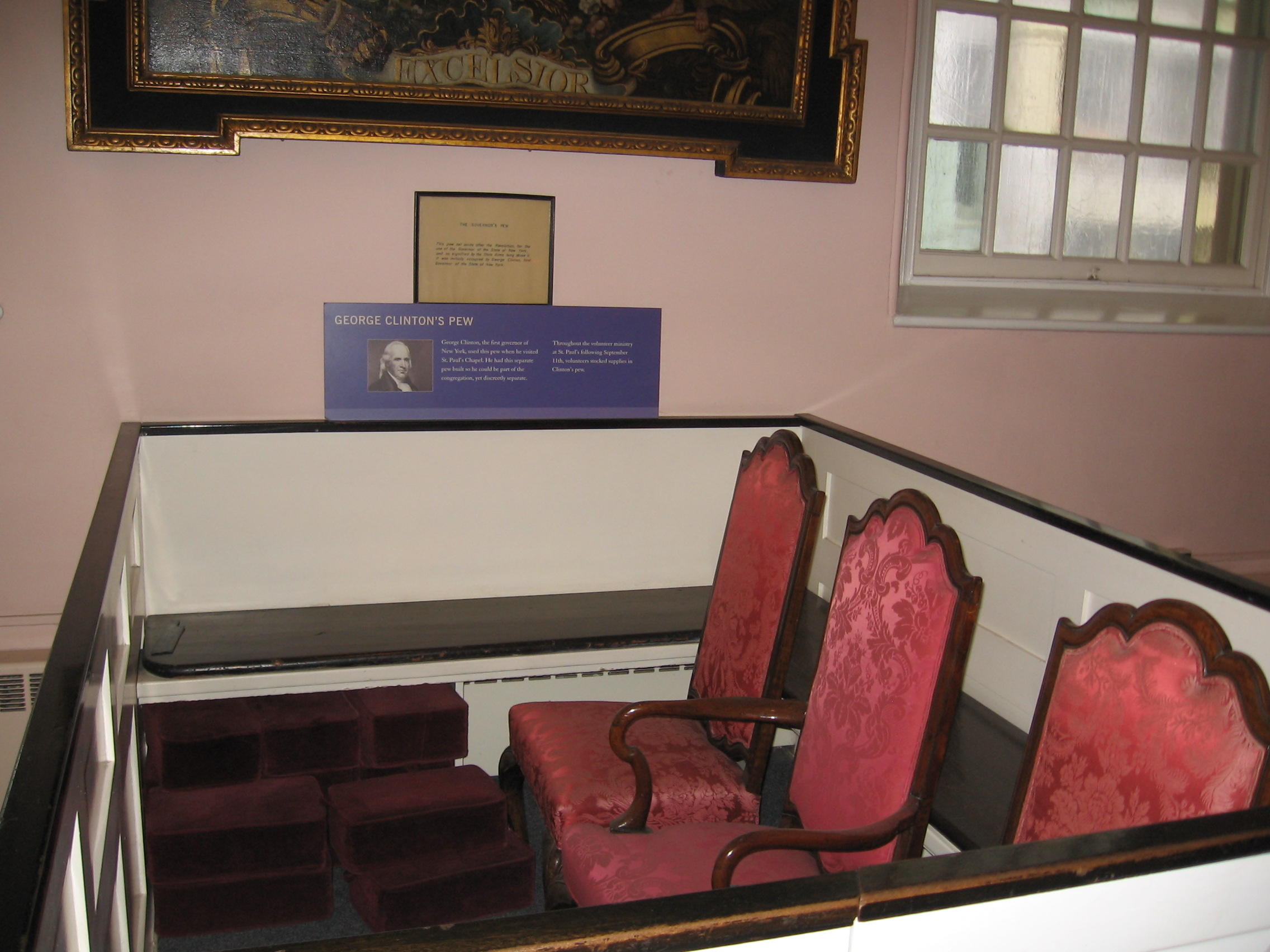
Clinton's pew at St. Paul's Chapel in New York City

After the war, he read law in New York City under the attorney William Smith. He returned home (which at that time was part of Ulster County) and began his legal practice in 1764. He became district attorney the following year. He was a member of the New York General Assembly for Ulster County from 1768 to 1775, aligned with the anti-British Livingston faction. His brother James was a member of the New York Provincial Congress that assembled in New York City on April 20, 1775.

== Revolutionary War ==
As a member of the New York General Assembly, Clinton was a vocal opponent of British imperial policies. In January 1775, he introduced a motion for the Assembly to approve the resolutions of the First Continental Congress. The motion was defeated, prompting Clinton to warn that the colonies would soon need to take to arms. In March 1775, he twice introduced a motion to declare that the British Parliament had no right to levy taxes on American colonies. His actions caught the attention of the Provincial Congress, which elected him to be one of New York's delegates to the Second Continental Congress. In Philadelphia, Clinton took his seat in Congress on May 15, 1775. He remained a delegate until July 8, 1776. However, on December 19, 1775, the Provincial Congress commissioned him a brigadier general in New York's state militia, tasked with defending the Highlands of the Hudson River from British attack. This role caused him to be absent from many sessions of the Continental Congress. Although he resigned his seat before New York's delegates had been granted permission to vote for, or sign, the Declaration of Independence, he was an enthusiastic supporter of American independence, even suggesting in one speech to Congress that a reward should be offered for the assassination of King George III. While commanding forces of the New York state militia, he built two forts along the Hudson River and stretched a giant chain across the river to keep British forces in New York City from sailing northward.

=== Wartime governor of New York ===
On March 25, 1777, Clinton was commissioned a brigadier general in the Continental Army. In June 1777, he was elected at the same time Governor and Lieutenant Governor of New York. He formally resigned the Lieutenant Governor's office and took the oath of office as Governor on July 30. He was re-elected five times, remaining in office until June 1795. Although he had been elected governor, he retained his commission in the Continental Army and commanded forces at Fort Clinton and Fort Montgomery on October 6, 1777. He remained in the Continental Army until it was disbanded on November 3, 1783.

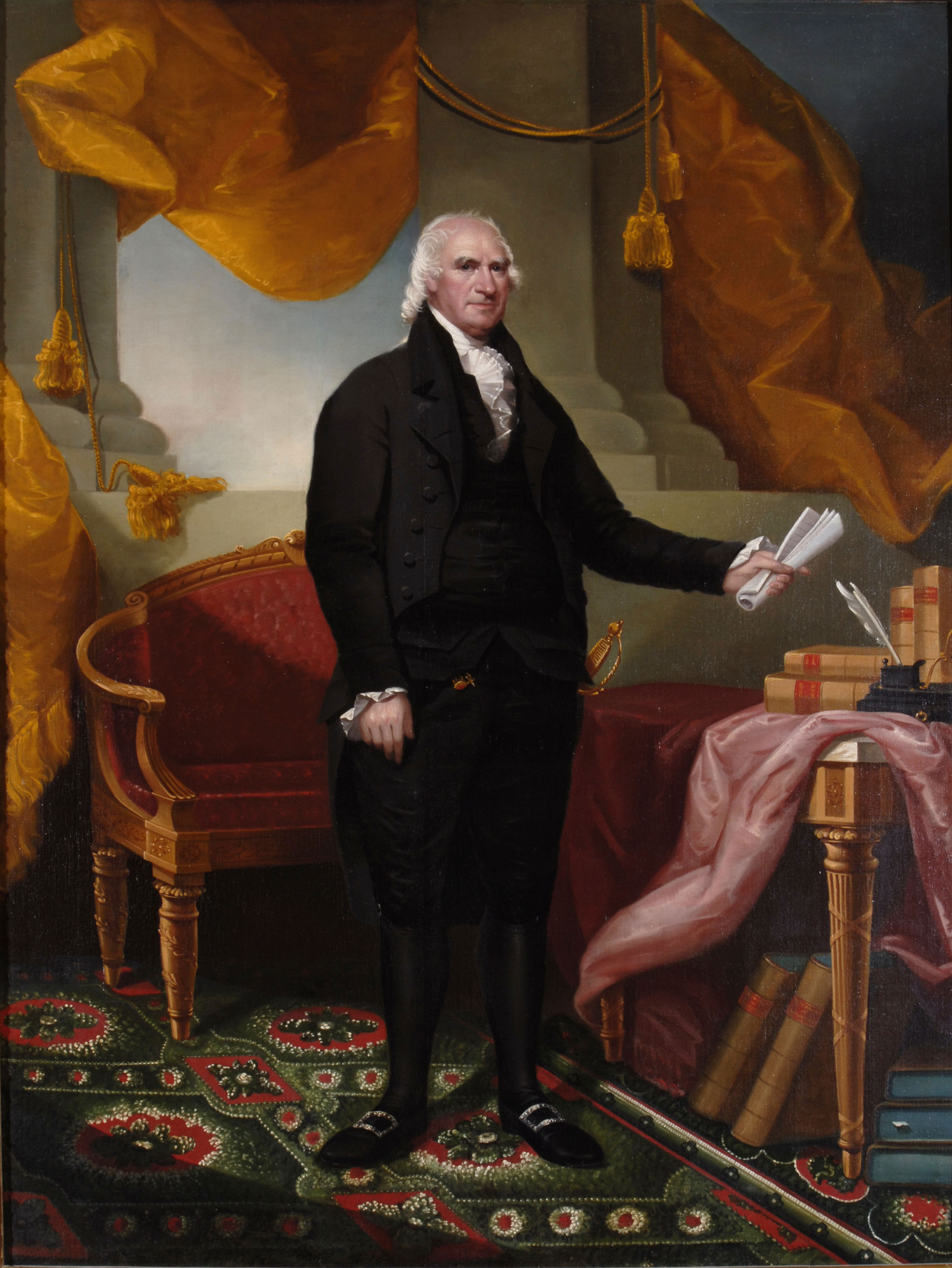
Gubernatorial portrait of George Clinton by Ezra Ames

He was known for his hatred of Tories and used the seizure and sale of Tory estates to help keep taxes down. A supporter and friend of George Washington, he supplied food to the troops at Valley Forge, rode with Washington to the first inauguration and gave an impressive dinner to celebrate it. In 1783, at Dobbs Ferry, Clinton and Washington negotiated with General Sir Guy Carleton for the evacuation of the British troops from their remaining posts in the United States. That same year, Clinton became an original member of the New York Society of the Cincinnati and served as its president from 1794 to 1795.

== Governorships of New York (1777-1795; 1801-1804) ==
=== 1780s ===
In the early 1780s, Clinton supported Alexander Hamilton's call for a stronger federal government than had been provided in the Articles of Confederation. However, Clinton eventually came to oppose Hamilton's proposal to allow Congress to impose tariffs, fearing that this power would cut into his home state's main source of income. He became one of the most prominent opponents to the ratification of the proposed United States Constitution, which would grant several new powers to the federal government. After New York and other states had ratified the Constitution, Clinton focused on passing constitutional amendments designed to weaken the powers of the federal government. In 1791, three years after the ratification of the Constitution, the states ratified the United States Bill of Rights.

Twentieth-century historian Herbert Storing identifies Clinton as "Cato", the pseudonymous author of the Anti-Federalist essays which appeared in New York newspapers during the ratification debates. However, the authorship of the essays is disputed.

In the first U.S. presidential election, held from 1788 to 1789, many Anti-Federalists supported Clinton for the position of vice president. Federalists rallied around the candidacy of John Adams, and Adams finished second in the electoral vote behind George Washington, making Adams vice president. Clinton received just three electoral votes, partly because the New York legislature deadlocked and was unable to appoint a slate of electors.

=== Threats to conquer Vermont ===
The land that is in the present-day state of Vermont was before 1764 a disputed territory claimed by the colonies of New Hampshire and New York. During 1749–1764 it was governed as a de facto part of New Hampshire and many thousands of settlers arrived. In 1764 King George III awarded the disputed region, then called the New Hampshire Grants, to New York. New York refused to recognize property claims based on New Hampshire law, thus threatening the eviction of many settlers. Consequently, New York's authority was resisted by local authorities and the militia known as the Green Mountain Boys. In 1777, having no further hope of rulings from the king or courts of England to protect their property, the politicians of the disputed territory declared it an independent state to be called Vermont. Vermont's repeated petitions for admission to the Union over the next several years were denied by the Continental Congress, in large part because of opposition from the state of New York and its governor George Clinton.

In 1778, Clinton wrote to some Vermonters loyal to New York, encouraging them "to Oppose the ridiculous and destructive Scheme of erecting those Lands into an Independent State."

On March 2, 1784, the legislature of New York, with Clinton's support, instructed its Congressional delegates to "press Congress for a decision in the long protracted controversy" and that New York would have to "recur to force, for the preservation of her lawful authority" and that if Congress would not act, then New York would be "destitute of the protection of the United States."

However, a Congressional committee recommended recognition of Vermont and its admission to the Union. The committee's recommended bill was opposed by New York's delegates and did not pass. Six years later the New York legislature decided to give up New York's claims to Vermont on the condition that Congress would admit Vermont to the Union, and the new state was admitted on March 4, 1791.

=== 1790s ===
In the 1792 presidential election, Clinton was chosen by the nascent Democratic-Republican Party as their candidate for vice president. While the Republicans joined in the general acclamation of Washington for a second term as president, they objected to the allegedly "monarchical" attitude of Vice President Adams. Clinton was nominated rather than Thomas Jefferson because the Virginia electors could not vote for Washington, and for a second Virginian. Clinton received 50 electoral votes to 77 for Adams. His candidacy was damaged by his anti-Federalist record and by his narrow and disputed re-election as governor in 1792. (He won by only 108 votes, and the substantial anti-Clinton vote of Otsego County was excluded on a technicality.)

Clinton did not run for reelection as governor in 1795. Some Democratic-Republican party leaders attempted to recruit him to run for vice president in 1796 election, but Clinton refused to run and party leaders instead turned to another New Yorker, Aaron Burr. Clinton nonetheless received seven electoral votes.

Clinton held no political office after 1795 until he was elected to the New York State Assembly in April 1800, and was a member of the 24th New York State Legislature. He entered the 1801 gubernatorial race at Burr's urging, and defeated the Federalist Party nominee, Stephen Van Rensselaer. Clinton served as governor until 1804. With 21 years of service, he was the longest-serving governor of a U.S. state until December 14, 2015, when Iowa governor Terry Branstad surpassed him.

== Vice presidency (1805–1812) ==
Clinton was selected as President Jefferson's running mate in the 1804 presidential election, replacing Aaron Burr. Vice President Burr had fallen out with the Jefferson administration early in his tenure, and President Jefferson often consulted with Clinton rather than Burr regarding New York appointments. Clinton was selected to replace Burr in 1804 due to his long public service and his popularity in the electorally important state of New York. He was also favored by Jefferson because, at age 69 in 1808, Jefferson hoped that Clinton would be too old to launch a presidential bid against Jefferson's preferred successor, Secretary of State James Madison.

When the Democratic-Republican ticket won the 1804 election, Clinton became the fourth vice president of the United States, and would become the first vice president to serve under two presidents, Jefferson and Madison. During his first term as vice president, under Thomas Jefferson, Clinton found himself marginalized by the President, as Jefferson sought to avoid enhancing his vice president's stature―still cognizant that Clinton could challenge Madison in 1808. Not only was Clinton largely ignored by President Jefferson, he struggled in his position as President of the Senate. He was unfamiliar with the rules of the Senate, and many senators viewed him as an ineffective presiding officer.

Clinton attempted to challenge Madison for the presidency in the 1808 election, but was outmaneuvered by Madison's supporters when the congressional nominating caucus chose him as the vice presidential nominee. Clinton's supporters nonetheless put him forward as a presidential candidate, attacking the foreign policy of the Jefferson administration. The Federalist Party considered endorsing Clinton's candidacy, but ultimately chose to re-nominate their 1804 ticket of Charles Cotesworth Pinckney and Rufus King. Clinton received just six electoral votes for president as Madison consolidated support within the party. Although Clinton had effectively run against Madison, he received the vice presidential votes of most Democratic-Republican electors, who did not want to set a precedent of defying the choice of the congressional nominating caucus. By his receiving votes for both offices in the 1808 election, Clinton became (and remains) the only person to receive votes in six different electoral college contests.

After the 1808 election, although he was ostensibly a member of the Madison administration, Clinton and his supporters frequently opposed Madison. Clinton helped block the appointment of Albert Gallatin as Secretary of State. He also cast an important tie-breaking vote that prevented the recharter of the First Bank of the United States.

== Death ==
In his eighth year as Vice President (his fourth under President Madison), George Clinton died from a heart attack on April 20, 1812, at the age of 72. Clinton was the first vice president to die in office as well as the first vice president to die overall. Clinton was the first of two vice presidents to serve in the position under two different presidents, the other being John C. Calhoun.

His original burial was in Washington, D.C. He was re-interred at the Old Dutch Churchyard in Kingston, New York, in 1908.

George died intestate with a large estate which was complex in probate court. A special legislative act was created for the succession of his estate, called "An ACT for the Relief of the Heirs of the late George Clinton, Esquire, deceased" passed March 12, 1813. This act was amended by a later act titled "An ACT to amend an act, entitled "an act for the relief of the heirs of the late George Clinton, Esquire, deceased" and passed April 6, 1814. These acts describe the complications of his land ownership and claims, and appoint heirs administrators of the estate.

Clinton's nephew, DeWitt Clinton, challenged Madison in 1812 after George Clinton's death. DeWitt Clinton won the backing of most Federalists, but was nonetheless defeated by Madison.

== Marriage and children ==
On February 7, 1770, Clinton married Sarah Cornelia Tappen (died 1800); they had five daughters and one son. Only three of them outlived their father, and the longest-lived child died at the age of just 44.

1. Catharine Clinton (1770–1811); married firstly, to John Taylor, and secondly Pierre Van Cortlandt, Jr. (1762–1848)
2. Cornelia Tappen Clinton (1774–1810); married Edmond-Charles Genêt (1763–1834)
3. George Washington Clinton (1778–1813); married Anna Floyd (1785–1857), daughter of William Floyd (1734–1821)
4. Elizabeth Clinton (1780–1825); married Matthias B. Tallmadge (1774–1819)
5. Martha Washington Clinton (1783–1795)
6. Maria Clinton (1785–1829); married Dr. Stephen D. Beekman, a grandson of Pierre Van Cortlandt (1721–1814)

== Legacy ==
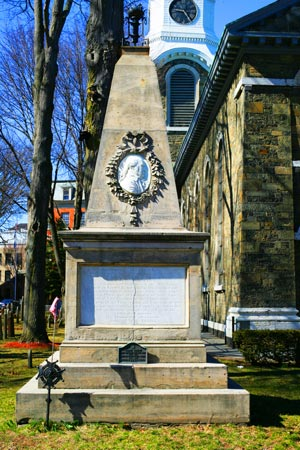
The grave monument of George Clinton in Kingston, New York

Historian Alan Taylor described George Clinton as "The astutest politician in Revolutionary New York," a man who "understood the power of symbolism and the new popularity of a plain style especially when practiced by a man with the means and accomplishments to set himself above the common people." His marriage to Cornelia Tappen strengthened his political position in heavily Dutch Ulster County.

Clinton County, New York; Clinton County, Ohio; the village of Clinton, Oneida County, New York (site of Hamilton College), and Clintonville, Columbus, Ohio are all named for him.

In 1873, the state of New York donated a bronze statue of Clinton to the U.S. Capitol's National Statuary Hall Collection. In 1787 Clinton was depicted on an unauthorized copper coin minted privately in New York with "EXCELSIOR" on reverse.

He was depicted in the painting Declaration of Independence by John Trumbull even though he neither signed it nor was present when it was signed. In 1976 the painting appeared on the reverse of the two dollar bill and printed again in series 1995 and 2003.

In 2000, the State of New York ceremonially renamed the Kingston-Rhinecliff Bridge in honor of Clinton.

== Notes ==
New office	Governor of New York; 1777–1795	Succeeded by John Jay
Preceded by John Jay	Governor of New York; 1801–1804	Succeeded by Morgan Lewis
Preceded by Aaron Burr	Vice President of the United States; 1805–1812	Succeeded by Elbridge Gerry
Academic offices
Preceded by Benjamin Moore; Acting	President of Columbia College; Acting; 1784–1787	Succeeded by William S. Johnson
New office	Chancellor of the University of the State of New York; 1787–1795	Succeeded by John Jay
Preceded by John Jay	Chancellor of the University of the State of New York; 1802–1804	Succeeded by Morgan Lewis
Party political offices
New political party	Democratic-Republican nominee for Governor of New York; 1792	Succeeded by Robert Yates
New political party	Democratic-Republican nominee for Vice President of the United States^{(1)} 1792	Succeeded by Aaron Burr^{(1)}
Preceded by Robert R. Livingston	Democratic-Republican nominee for Governor of New York; 1801	Succeeded by Morgan Lewis
Preceded by Aaron Burr^{(1)}	Democratic-Republican nominee for Vice President of the United States; 1804, 1808	Succeeded by John Langdon; Withdrew
Notes and references
1. Prior to the passage of the Twelfth Amendment in 1804, each presidential elector would cast two votes; the highest vote-getter with a majority would become president and the runner-up would become vice president. In 1792, with George Washington as the prohibitive favorite to be elected president, the Democratic-Republican Party fielded Clinton with the intention that he be elected vice president. Similarly, in both 1796 and 1800, the Democratic-Republican Party fielded both Aaron Burr and Thomas Jefferson, with the intention that Jefferson be elected president and Burr be elected vice president.
