= Charles Clinton =

Anglo-Irish soldier (1690–1773)

- Coat of Arms of Charles Clinton
- Born: 1690; Corboy, County Longford, Kingdom of Ireland
- Died: 19 November 1773 (aged 83); Little Britain, Province of New York
- Occupations: Soldier and Politician
- Title: Colonel
- Spouse: Elizabeth Denniston (m. 1720)
- Children: Catherine; James; Mary; Alexander; Charles; James; George
- Parent(s): James Clinton (father); Elizabeth Smith (mother)

Col. Charles Clinton (1690 – 19 November 1773) was an Anglo-Irish soldier and politician in colonial America. A colonel of the French and Indian War, he was the father of General James Clinton and George Clinton, and the grandfather of DeWitt Clinton.

== Early life ==
Charles Clinton was born in Corboy, County Longford, Kingdom of Ireland. He was the son of James Clinton and Elizabeth (née Smith) Clinton.

== Life in America ==
In May 1729, Charles, his wife Elizabeth, with two daughters and one son, chartered a ship from Dublin called the George and Anne and sailed for Philadelphia with a group of neighbors and friends from County Longford intending to settle in Pennsylvania. According to his papers, he paid for ninety four of the passengers. The captain of the ship intentionally starved the passengers, possibly as a way to steal their belongings. Ninety-six of the passengers died, including Clinton's son and a daughter. In October 1729, they arrived at Cape Cod, and after paying a large ransom for their lives, the survivors were allowed to disembark.

In the spring of 1731, the group moved to Ulster County, New York (now Orange County), where they settled in an area called Little Britain about eight miles from the Hudson River and sixty miles north of New York City. The farm was a little more than 312 acres. Charles Clinton's life there is described in this selection from DeWitt Clinton's memoir:

... these hardy pioneers were at that period so exposed to the incursions of the Indians, then inhabiting the vicinity of their residence, that it was found necessary to erect a palisade work around his house, for the security of himself and his neighbours. In this retreat Mr. Clinton spent his time in the improvement of his farm, in the cultivation of literature, in the enjoyment of his library, the education of his children, and occasionally acting as a surveyor of land, for which he was well qualified by his education, and particularly his mathematical knowledge, in which he eminently excelled. Possessed of a well selected library, and endowed with extraordinary talents, he made continual accessions to his store of useful knowledge.

His first appointment was that of a Justice of the peace; he was afterwards promoted to the station of a Judge of the Common Pleas for the county of Ulster. In 1756 he was appointed by colonial governor Sir Charles Hardy, a Lt. Colonel of the militia of the province, and commanded a regiment at the capture of Fort Frontenac, now Kingston, by Colonel Bradstreet. His sons James and George served with him at Frontenac.

== Personal life ==
Charles Clinton married Elizabeth Denniston. Together, they had seven children:

- Catherine Clinton (1723–1762) married Col. James McClaughry (1722–1790)
- James Clinton (1726–1729) died at sea
- Mary Clinton (1728–1729) died at sea
- Alexander Clinton (1732–1758) became a physician and died of smallpox in 1758
- Charles Clinton (1734–1791) became a surgeon
- Major-General James Clinton (1736–1812)
- Governor George Clinton (1739–1812), who served as the 4th vice president of the United States.

Clinton died on his farm on 19 November 1773 at the age of 83, just before the revolution in which his sons would play a part. His widow, Elizabeth, died at the residence of their son James in 1779.
