= Lindsley =

Lindsley is a surname. Notable people with the surname include:

- Adrian Van Sinderen Lindsley (1814–1885), businessman, politician, member of the Tennessee Senate from 1868 to 1869
- Blake Lindsley (born 1973), American actress
- James Girard Lindsley (1819–1898), U.S. Representative from New York
- Joe Lindsley, American journalist
- John Berrien Lindsley (1822–1897), American educator, President of the now-defunct University of Nashville from 1855 to 1897
- Lawrence Denny Lindsley (1879–1974), American photographer and also worked as a miner, hunter, and guide
- Ogden Lindsley (1922–2004), American psychologist
- Philip Lindsley (1786–1855), American educator, Vice President of the College of New Jersey (later known as Princeton University) from 1822 to 1824, and as the first President of the now-defunct University of Nashville from 1824 to 1850
- William D. Lindsley (1812–1890), U.S. Representative from Ohio

== See also ==
- Lindsley House (disambiguation)
- Linsley (disambiguation)
