= Lindsley Hall =

- U.S. National Register of Historic Places
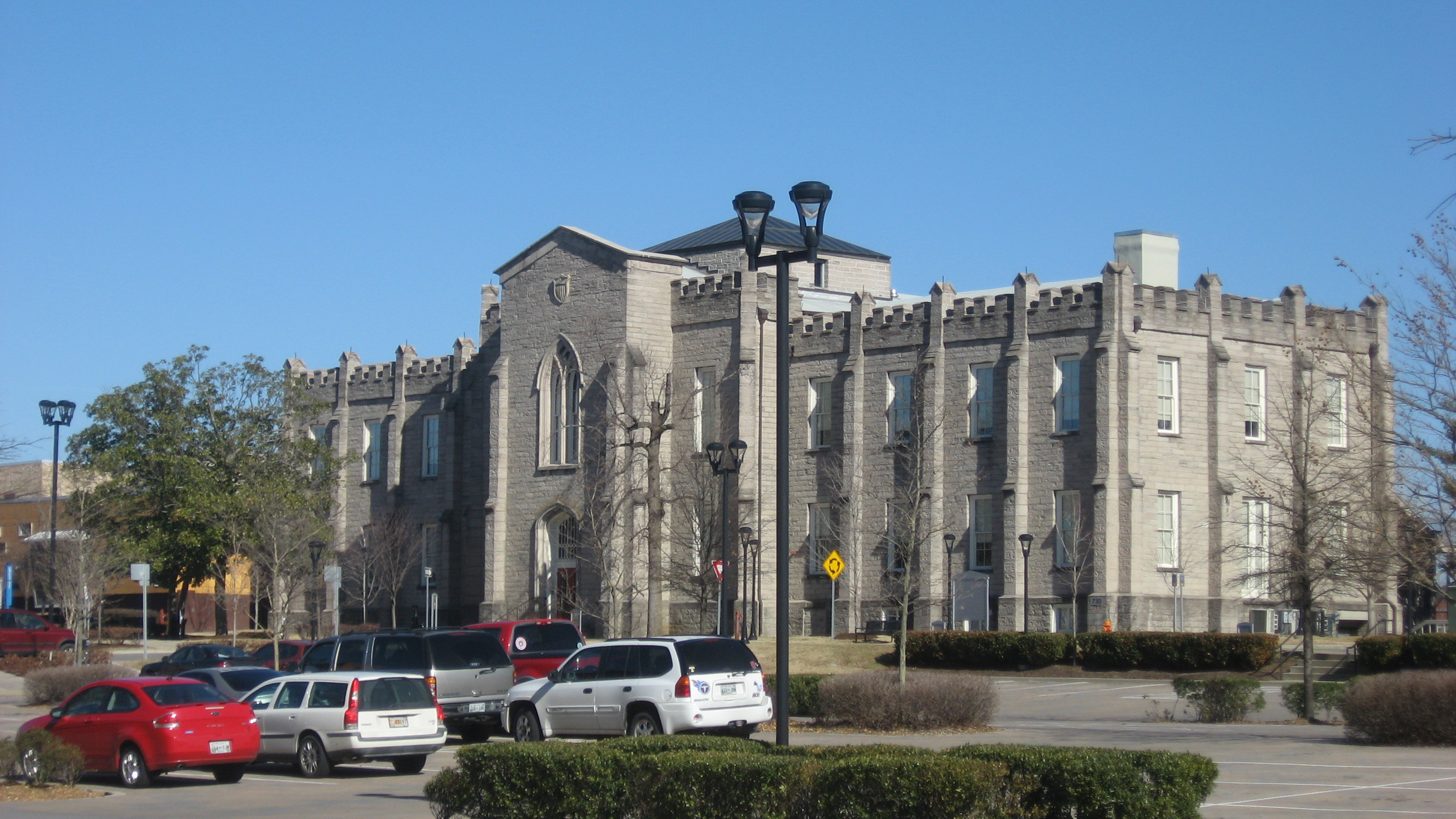
- Lindsley Hall in January 2014

- Location within Tennessee Location within the United States
- Location: 724 2nd Avenue, South; Nashville, Tennessee, U.S.
- Coordinates: 36°09′15.0″N 86°46′05.0″W
- Area: 4 acres (1.6 ha)
- Built: 1853
- Architect: Adolphus Heiman
- Architectural style: Gothic Revival
- NRHP reference No.: 71000818
- Added to NRHP: May 6, 1971

Lindsley Hall is a historic building in Nashville, Tennessee. Built in the antebellum South as the main building of the University of Nashville, it served as a Union hospital during the Civil War. It became the Nashville Children's Museum in 1945. In 1974 the museum moved to a new facility at 800 Fort Negley Boulevard, became the Cumberland Science Museum and is now known as the Adventure Science Center. The building is once again called Lindsley Hall and is used by the City of Nashville for Metro Government offices.

== Location ==
The building is located at 724 2nd Avenue South in Nashville, the county seat of Davidson County, Tennessee in the Southern United States.

== History ==
The building, constructed with grey limestone, was completed in 1853. It was designed by Prussian-born architect Adolphus Heiman in the Gothic Revival architectural style. It was built as the main hall for the University of Nashville while the university was closed from 1850 to 1855 due to a cholera epidemic. It was named Lindsley Hall in honor of Dr John Berrien Lindsley, who served as the Chancellor of the University of Nashville from 1855 to its demise in 1873. During the American Civil War, it was turned into a hospital for the Union Army in 1862.

From 1867 to 1905, the building was home to the Montgomery Bell Academy, Peabody College, and the Agricultural and Industrial State Normal College (later renamed Tennessee State University, a historically black university). From 1914 to 1925, it was home to the Vanderbilt University School of Medicine. Later, it was used as an armory for the Tennessee State Guard and as a public health center. The building was the location of the Nashville Children's Museum from 1945 to 1974. More recently, it was renovated as an office building to USGBC LEED Silver standard in 2011.

== Architectural significance ==
It has been listed on the National Register of Historic Places since May 6, 1971.

== Interior ==
=== Floor plans ===
Floor plans of Lindsley Hall

Foundation

First Floor

Second Floor

Layout and room names as of 1933
