= John Berrien Lindsley =

American historian (1822–1897)

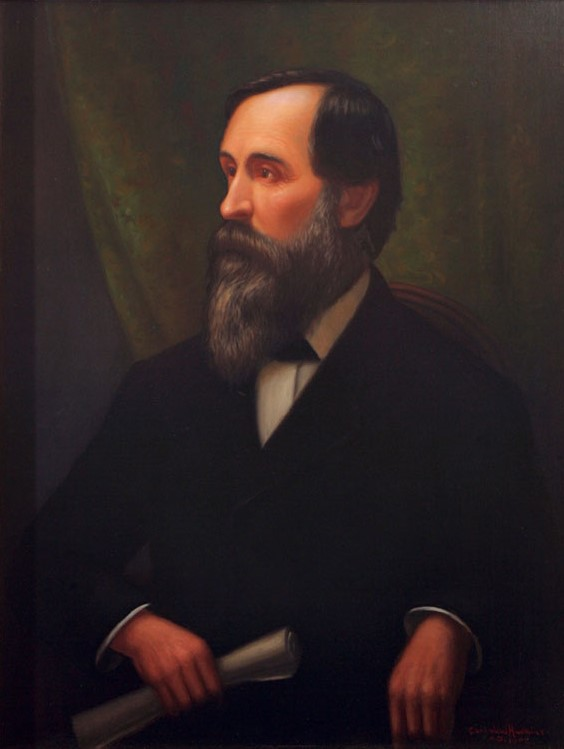
- Portrait by Cornelius Hankins
- Born: October 24, 1822; Princeton, New Jersey, U.S.
- Died: 1897 (aged 74–75); Nashville, Tennessee, U.S.
- Resting place: Mount Olivet Cemetery
- Education: University of Nashville; University of Pennsylvania
- Occupations: Preacher, educator
- Spouse: Sarah McGavock
- Children: 6
- Parent(s): Philip Lindsley; Margaret Lawrence Lindsley
- Relatives: Nathaniel Lawrence (maternal grandfather); Adrian Van Sinderen Lindsley (brother); Nathaniel Lawrence Lindsley (brother); Randal William McGavock (brother-in-law); Percy Warner (son-in-law)

John Berrien Lindsley (1822–1897) was an American Presbyterian minister and educator in Nashville, Tennessee.

Born in Princeton, New Jersey, and educated at the University of Pennsylvania Medical School, he married an heiress to the Carnton plantation and ministered to slaves and the poor. He was Professor of Medicine at the University of Nashville and co-founder of its Medical Department (a precursor to the Vanderbilt University School of Medicine). He served as the Dean of the Medical Department from 1850 to 1855, and as the Chancellor of the University of Nashville from 1855 to its demise in 1873.

During the American Civil War of 1861-1865, he protected its campus buildings, and he was in charge of Confederate hospitals in Nashville. After the war, he was a superintendent of Nashville schools and a co-founder of the Montgomery Bell Academy.

== Early life ==
Lindsley was born on October 24, 1822, in Princeton, New Jersey. His father, Dr. Philip Lindsley, was an acting president of Princeton University and resigned in 1824 to become president of the University of Nashville. His mother was Margaret Lawrence Lindsley. He had a brother, Adrian Van Sinderen Lindsley. Lindsley moved to Nashville, Tennessee, with his family when he was two years old.

Lindsley received a Bachelor of Arts degree from University of Nashville in 1839, and a Master of Arts degree in 1841. He received his M.D. degree in 1843 from the Medical School at the University of Pennsylvania.

Lindsley became a congregant at the First Presbyterian Church of Nashville in 1840. Four years later, on April 10, 1845, he was ordained as a Presbyterian minister. He received a Doctor of Sacred Theology from Princeton University in 1858.

== Career ==
Lindsley became the pastor of the First Presbyterian Church of Smyrna, Tennessee, in 1846. He returned to Nashville in 1847, where he was appointed by the Presbyterian Board of Domestic Missions to preach to African slaves and poor whites. He was also the pastor of Tulip Grove, a plantation owned by Andrew Jackson Donelson next to The Hermitage, another plantation owned by President Andrew Jackson near Nashville.

Meanwhile, Lindsley had been a classmate and he was a good friend William Walker, who ruled Nicaragua between 1856 and 1857. He was Southern Presbyterian and believed in the mission of civilizing the world. His belief was shared and supported by his friend William Walker.

Lindsley was a lecturer in the Theological Department of Cumberland University in Lebanon, Tennessee, in 1848-1850. By 1850, he joined his father at the University of Nashville and co-founded the Medical Department alongside Dr. William K. Bowling and others. He was a professor of chemistry at the University of Nashville and served in that position until 1873. He served as the first Dean of the medical faculty until 1855, when he was elected as a chancellor of University of Nashville. During those years, he oversaw the merger of the Western Military Institute with the University of Nashville, and he hired Prussian-born architect Adolphus Heiman to design Lindsley Hall, the main building on campus, which was completed in 1853. Additionally, he served on the Tennessee Board of Education from 1856 to 1860. Meanwhile, Lindsley took trips with Gerard Troost to look for fossils in the Tennessee countryside, and considered becoming a geologist himself.

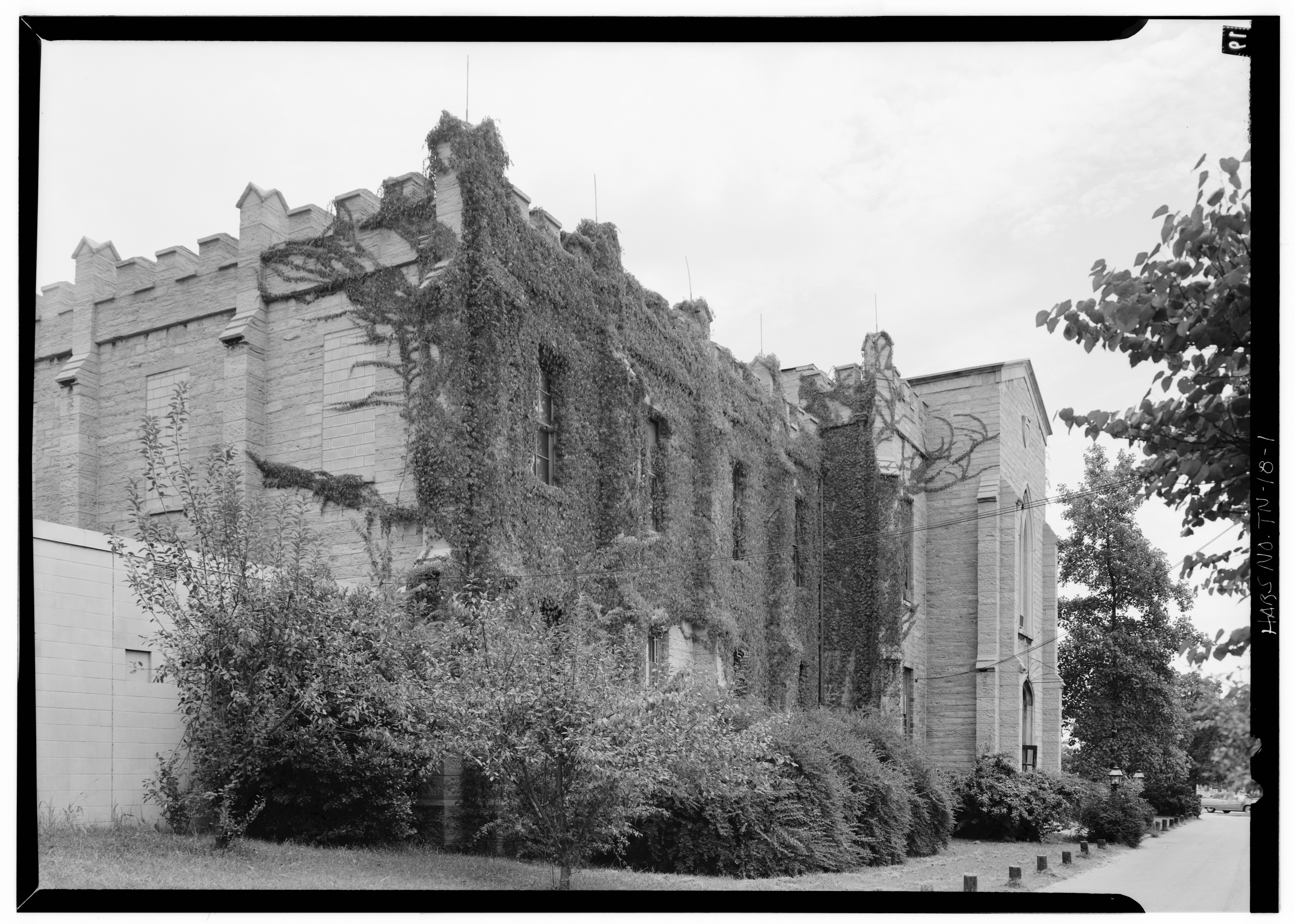
Lindsley Hall, the main building of the University of Nashville commissioned by Lindsley.

During the American Civil War, Lindsley was responsible for protecting the University of Nashville from the Union Army. He turned the university buildings into a hospital for the Confederate States Army. He was also in charge of all Confederate hospitals in Nashville.

Lindsley was appointed as superintendent of schools in Tennessee in 1866. A year later, in 1867, he established Montgomery Bell Academy in 1867. Three years later, in 1870, he was a co-founder of the Tennessee College of Pharmacy. Lindsley served as secretary of the Tennessee Board of Health from 1877 to 1897.

Lindsley was a co-founder of the American Association for the Advancement of Science. He was a member of the American Public Health Association, the American Medical Association, the American Academy of Medicine, the American Chemical Society, the American Historical Association, the Medical Society of Tennessee, and the Tennessee Historical Society.

Lindsley authored The Confederate Military Annals of Tennessee, published in 1886.

== Personal life ==
Lindsley married Sarah McGavock, the daughter of Jacob McGavock, on February 9, 1857. Sarah was the granddaughter of Randal McGavock, who was the owner of the Carnton plantation and served as Mayor of Nashville from 1824 to 1825, as well as Felix Grundy, who served as the Senator from Tennessee from 1829 to 1838 and as the 13th United States Attorney General from 1838 to 1840. She was also the sister of Randal William McGavock, who served as the mayor of Nashville from 1858 to 1859.

They had six children. Their daughter Margaret married Percy Warner, a prominent Nashville businessman and the namesake of the Percy Warner Park.

== Death and legacy ==
Lindsley died in 1897 in Nashville, Tennessee. He was buried in the Mount Olivet Cemetery. Two of his granddaughters, Mary and Pierce, were the first and second wives of Luke Lea, who served as the Senator from Tennessee from 1911 to 1917.

The University of Nashville Medical Department is a precursor to the Vanderbilt University School of Medicine, founded in 1875. As a result, Lindsley's portrait is on display on the Vanderbilt campus. It is also on display on the second floor of the Nashville Public Library.
