= Adrian Van Sinderen Lindsley =

American lawyer, businessman and politician (1814–1885)

- Born: September 8, 1814; Princeton, New Jersey
- Died: January 23, 1885 (aged 70); Nashville, Tennessee
- Resting place: Mount Olivet Cemetery
- Education: University of Nashville
- Occupations: Lawyer, businessman, politician
- Spouse: Eliza Trimble Lindsley
- Children: 9
- Parent(s): Philip Lindsley; Margaret Lawrence Lindsley
- Relatives: John Berrien Lindsley (brother); Nathaniel Lawrence Lindsley (brother); Nathaniel Lawrence (maternal grandfather)

Adrian Van Sinderen Lindsley (September 8, 1814 – January 23, 1885) was an American lawyer, businessman and politician from Tennessee.

== Early life and education ==
Adrian Van Sinderen Lindsley was born on September 8, 1814 in Princeton, New Jersey. His father, Philip Lindsley (1786–1855), served as the first President of the University of Nashville in Nashville, Tennessee. His brother, John Berrien Lindsley (1822–1897), served as its second President. His mother was Margaret Lawrence Lindsley. His maternal grandfather was Nathaniel Lawrence (1761–1797), who served as the New York Attorney General from 1792 to 1795.

Lindsley graduated from the University of Nashville.

== Career ==
Lindsley started his career as a lawyer. He later became President of the Mt Olivet Cemetery Company, which established the Mount Olivet Cemetery in Nashville. He also served as President of the Nashville and Lebanon Turnpike Company, which built a toll road from Nashville to Lebanon, Tennessee. He also served as the Secretary of the Board of Trust of his alma mater, the University of Nashville, from 1839 to 1885.

Lindsley was a Republican and supported the Union. He served as Nashville postmaster from 1862 to 1867, during the American Civil War of 1861–1865. In a letter to Governor Andrew Johnson (1808–1875) on April 22, 1862, he blamed Reverend John Berry McFerrin (1807–1887), a minister of the Methodist Episcopal Church, South for encouraging secessionist activities in Nashville, as opposed to more moderate Methodists like Reverend Holland Nimmons McTyeire (1824–1889), Reverend John B. Somers (1801–1876), Reverend James L. Houston (1806–1888) and Alexander Little Page Green (1806–1874).

After the war, Lindsley served as a member of the Tennessee Senate from 1868 to 1869. As Senator, he opposed the coercive policies towards former Confederates imposed by Governor William Gannaway Brownlow (1805–1877).

== Personal life ==
Lindsley married Eliza Trimble Lindsley (1819–1893). They had nine children.

Lindsley died on January 23, 1885 in Nashville, Davidson County, Tennessee. He was buried at the Mount Olivet Cemetery in Nashville.
