= Downtown YMCA =

Building in Columbus, Ohio

- Central Building of the Columbus Young Men's Christian Association
- U.S. National Register of Historic Places
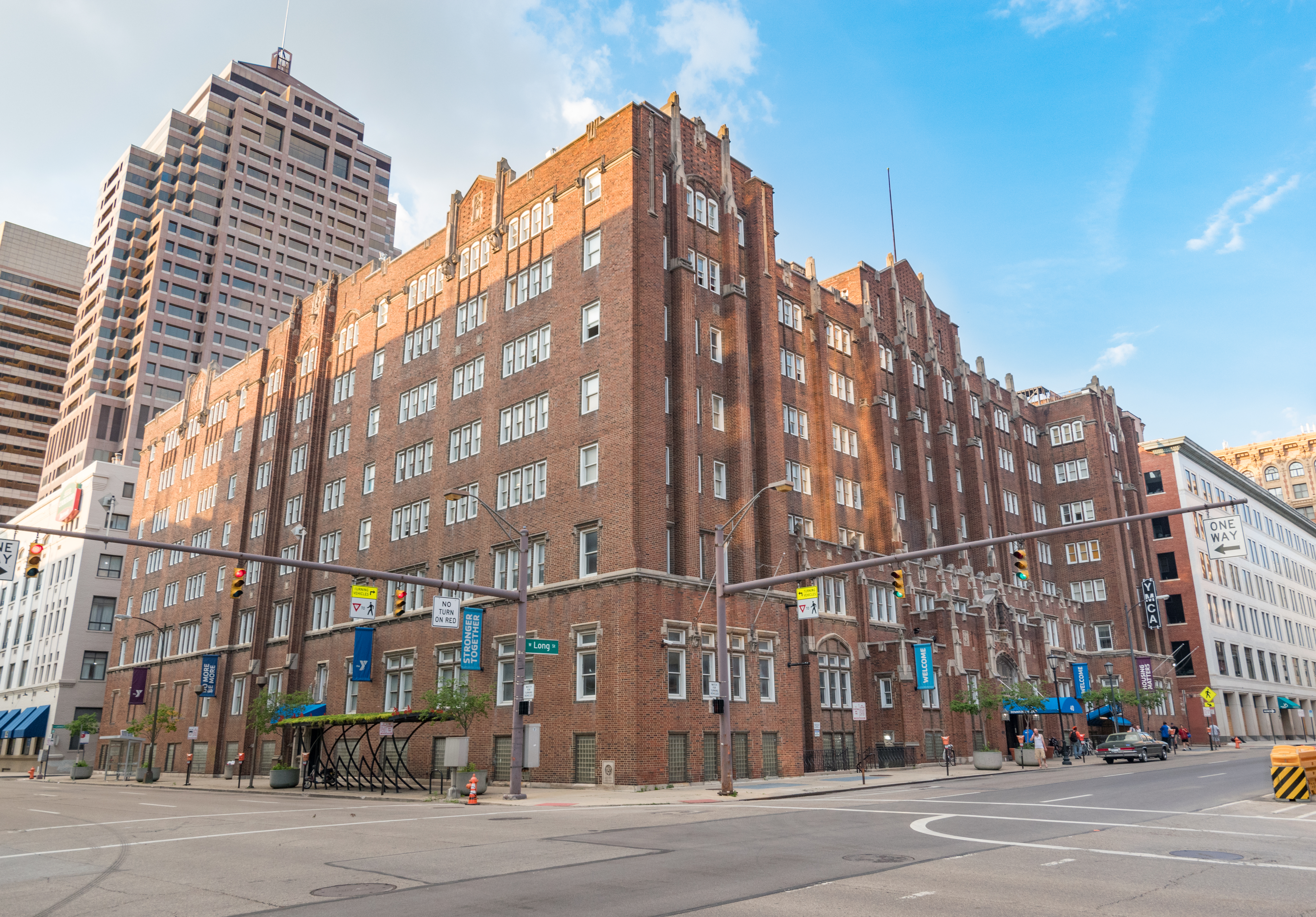
- Interactive map highlighting the building's location
- Location: 40 W. Long St., Columbus, Ohio
- Coordinates: 39.965°N 83.0025°W
- Built: 1924
- Architect: Shattuck & Layer
- Architectural style: Jacobethan Revival, Late Gothic Revival
- NRHP reference No.: 93000402
- Added to NRHP: May 6, 1993

The Downtown YMCA is a historic former YMCA building in Downtown Columbus, Ohio. It was the largest YMCA resident facility in the United States. It was listed on the National Register of Historic Places in 1993. The seven-story building was designed in the Jacobethan Revival and Late Gothic Revival styles by Chicago architecture firm Shattuck & Layer.

== Design ==
The Downtown YMCA was designed by Shattuck & Layer, Chicago architects who designed many YMCA buildings across the United States and abroad. The firm designed the Columbus building in the Jacobethan Revival style, with complex brickwork, cut-stone details, three-part rectangular windows, and roofline battlements. It also makes use of several Late Gothic Revival elements including pointed arches and buttressing. The exterior makes use of dark red brick and light-colored cut limestone, adding contrast and depth to the facade.

The massive seven-story building has a steel frame and a concrete foundation. Its exterior is faced with Flemish-bond brick and limestone ornamentation.

== History ==
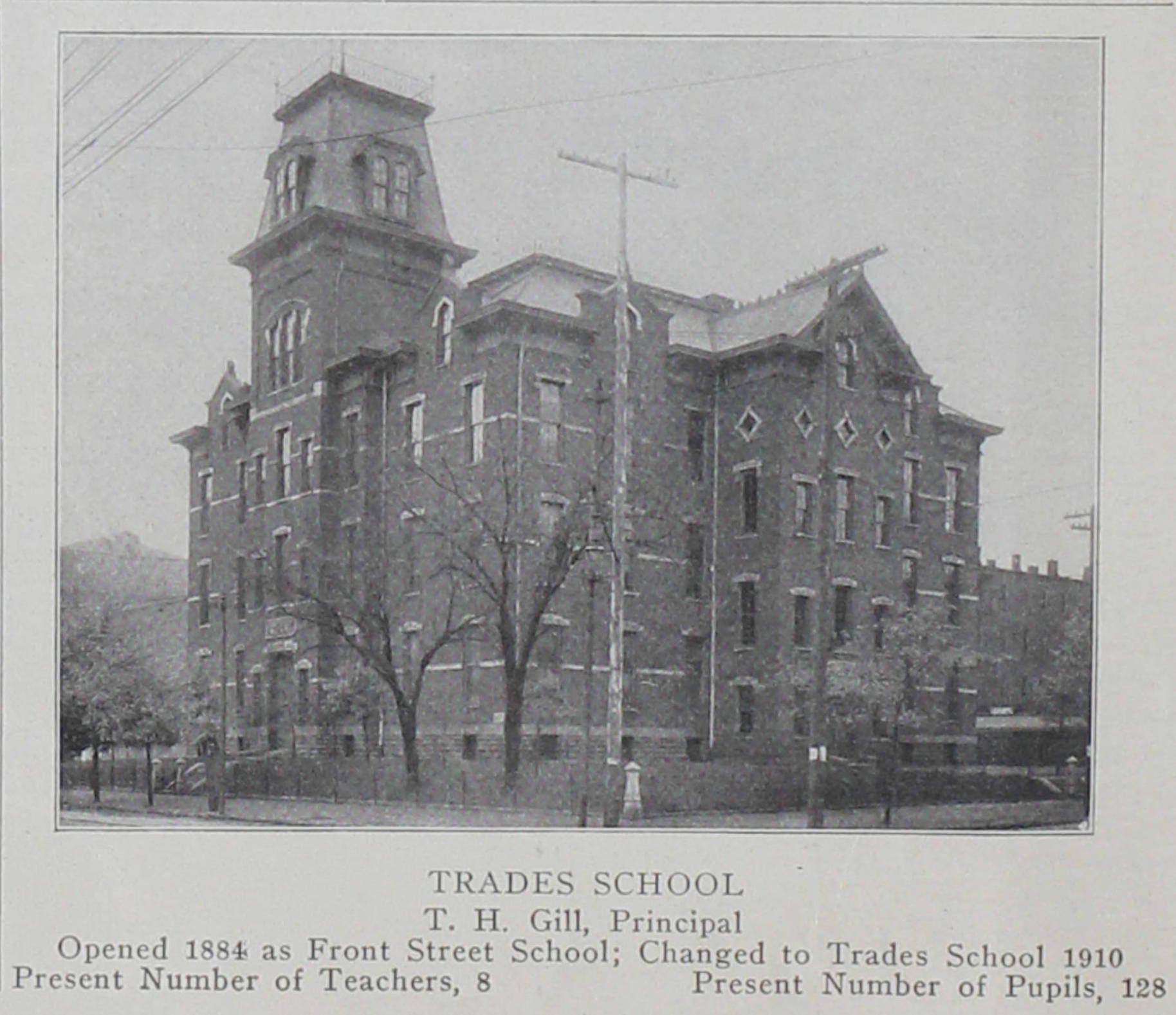
The Front St. or Trades School, formerly on the site

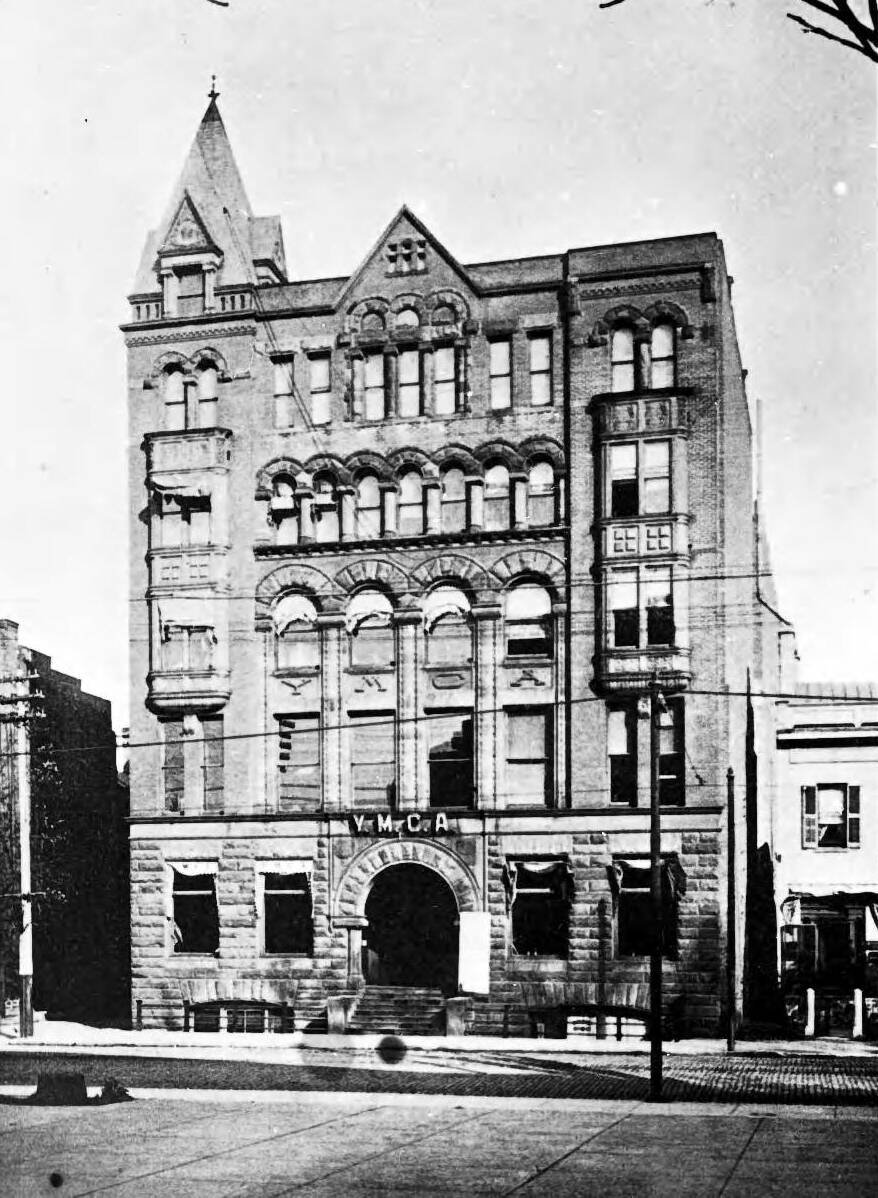
Home of the Columbus YMCA on Capitol Square, 1893–1923

The YMCA was first established in Columbus in 1855, reorganized in 1875, and moved locations numerous times. Its first headquarters opened at 34 S. 3rd St. (on Capitol Square) in 1893, in a Yost & Packard building. The site now holds the Columbus Dispatch Building. Several branches to the Columbus YMCA opened over the next decades; during this time the organization realized it needed more space to accommodate its growing membership.

The organization purchased the lot for the current YMCA in December 1916, with delayed construction due to World War I. The Front Street School, built in 1885, was demolished in 1918 to make way for the YMCA building. Ground was broken for the building on November 11, 1921, and its cornerstone was laid on January 5, 1923. The building was dedicated on January 13, 1924. It cost $850,000 to build, and at the time it was claimed to be the largest YMCA in the world. The building hosted the first evening high school which evolved to include post-secondary and professional programs to become Franklin University.

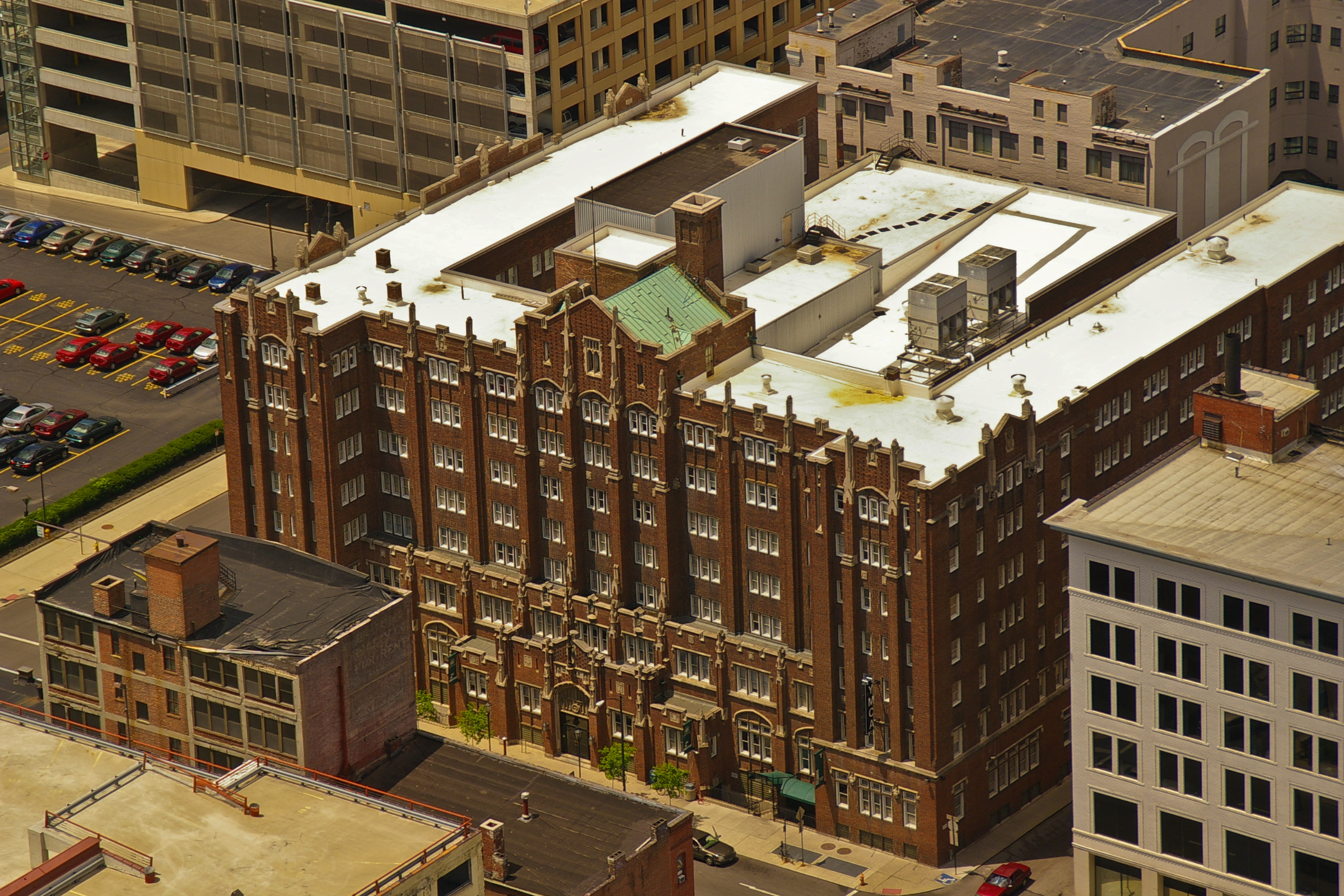
View from the Rhodes State Office Tower

The building was listed on the National Register of Historic Places in 1993. In 1995, the building's title was temporarily transferred to the Columbus City Council to help a $19 million restoration of the building qualify for a 30-year exemption on real estate taxes. The project, designed by architects Lusk & Harkins of Columbus, included renovating the existing 350 apartments, adding 50 additional units, installing air conditioning, expanding fitness facilities, and restoring the original lobbies. The renovations began in 1997. According to the architects, the project involved a complete historic restoration, and began a 30-year effort to restore YMCA buildings throughout Central Ohio.

In 2019, after years of studying potential renovations, the 403-unit building was announced to close in three to seven years, as the YMCA moved its residents to newer facilities. The 235,118-square-foot (21,843.2 m^{2}) building has a market value of $5.6 million, and would require $50–60 million in renovation, not affordable as it is close to the Columbus YMCA's entire annual budget. The organization planned to lease out a facility and redistribute residents to existing facilities, and to build a new full-service downtown facility for its 3,400 YMCA members in the next five to ten years. The YMCA was confident the building can be repurposed, having talked to 8-10 developers, with none who have toured having proposed demolishing it.

In August 2022, YMCA of Central Ohio and the Columbus Downtown Development Corporation (CDDC) began working on a deal for the CDDC to take over ownership of the building by January 2023. Several dozen current residents of the building would be moved to new housing for low-income seniors operated by the Columbus Metropolitan Housing Authority in Franklinton. On March 16, 2023, the building was sold to the CDDC for $1 million. The Columbus Landmarks Foundation listed the Downtown YMCA as an endangered site in June 2023, in the 2023 edition of its Most Endangered List.

== See also ==
- National Register of Historic Places listings in Columbus, Ohio
- Social services and homelessness in Columbus, Ohio
