= Shattuck and Hussey =

Shattuck and Hussey was a Chicago-based architectural firm founded by Walter F. Shattuck (1871–1948) and Harry Hussey (1882–1967).

== History ==
Shattuck studied architecture at the University of Illinois. After graduation, he taught construction and perspective at the Chicago School of Architecture (now the Art Institute of Chicago) from 1891 to 1916. Hussey was born in Ontario, Canada in 1882 and worked at a knitting mill and a mine before entering architecture school with the encouragement of the mine owners. In Chicago, Hussey and Shattuck met and decided to go into business together.

In the early 1900s, the Shattuck and Hussey won a design competition for the YMCA and went on to design dozens of the nearly 200 YMCA buildings built between 1906 and World War I. The YMCA treated the firm's designers as quasi-employees and relied on the firm to produce functional, cost-effective facilities. These could easily be replicated from project to project and reduce risk to local YMCA building committees. Their designs for the organization were heavily influenced by the Chicago School which clad steel and concrete structures with masonry and neoclassical details.

In 1911, Hussey embarked on a long stay in Asia where the firm was hired to design a dozen YMCAs, including Seoul and Hong Kong.

== Works ==
Partial list of works:

- Kroehler YMCA, Naperville, Illinois, US (1910)
- Young Women's Christian Association Building in Nashville, Tennessee, US (1911)
- Peking Union Medical College, Beijing, China (1917)
- Chinese YMCA of Hong Kong, at No. 51 Bridges Street, Sheung Wan, Hong Kong (1918)
- The Historic YWCA at 2 S Adams Avenue, Mason City, Iowa, US (1918)
- Minneapolis YMCA Central Building, Minneapolis, Minnesota, US (1919)
- Downtown YMCA, Columbus, Ohio, US (1924)
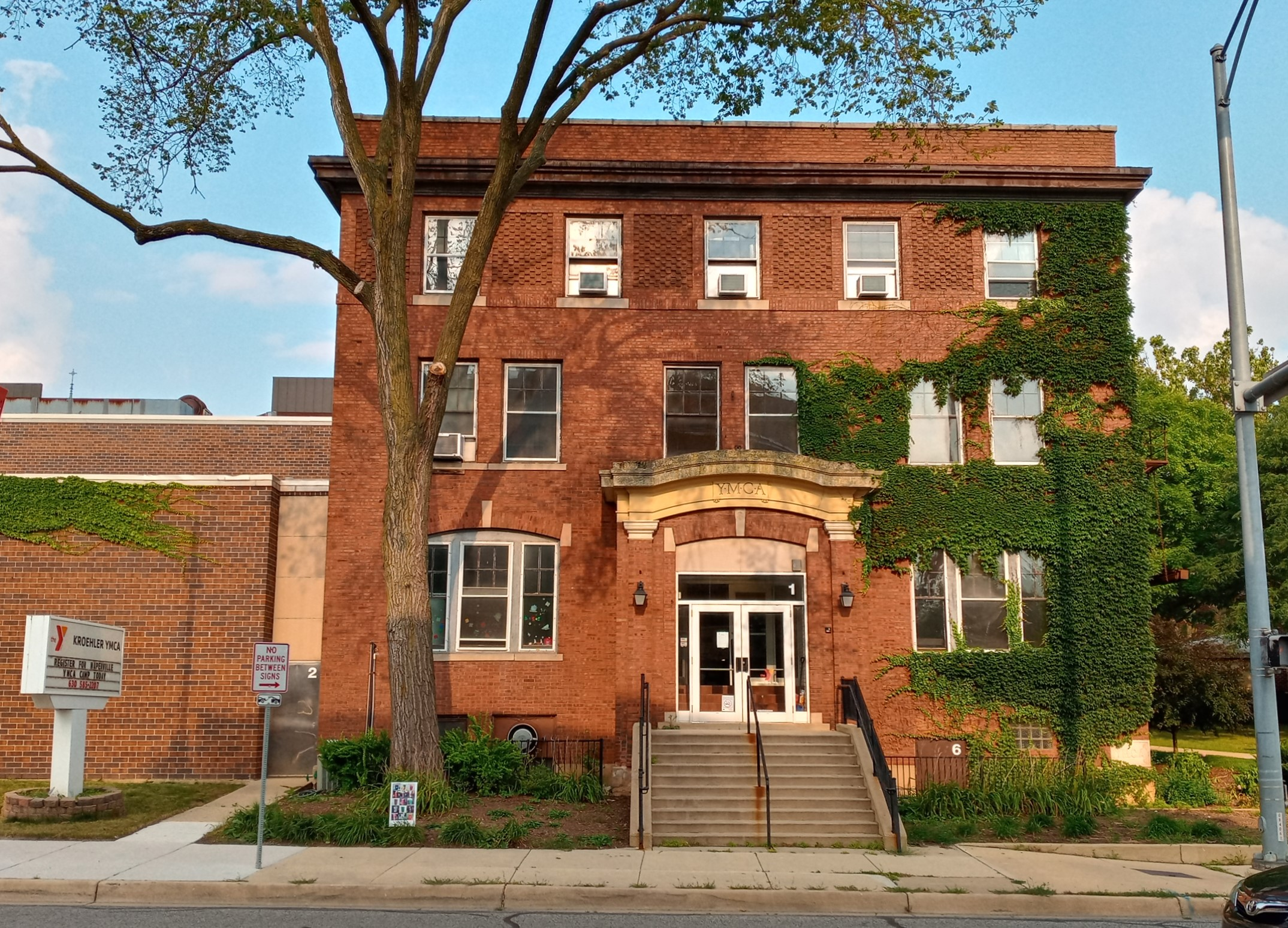
Kroehler YMCA, Naperville, Illinois

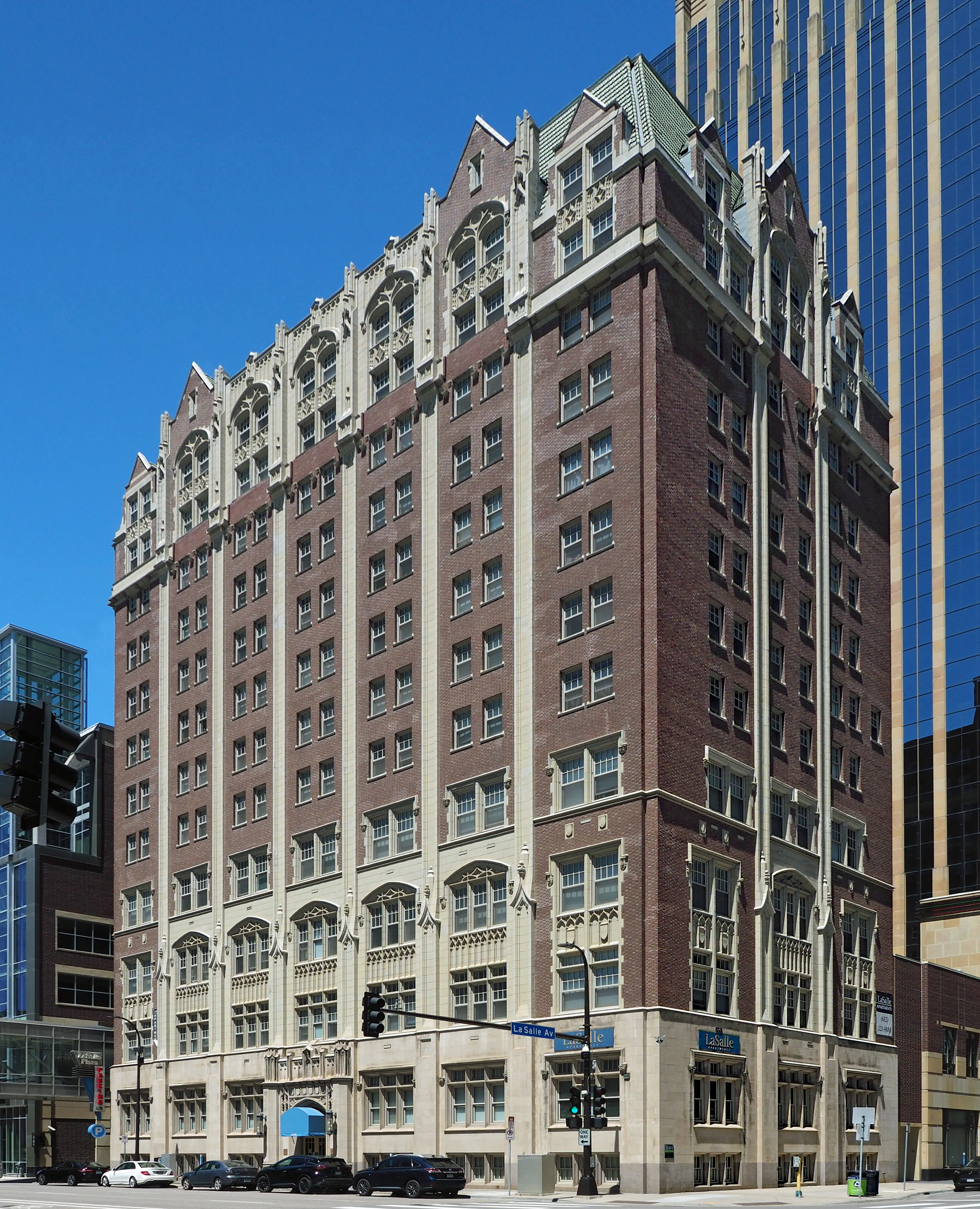
Minneapolis YMCA Central Building

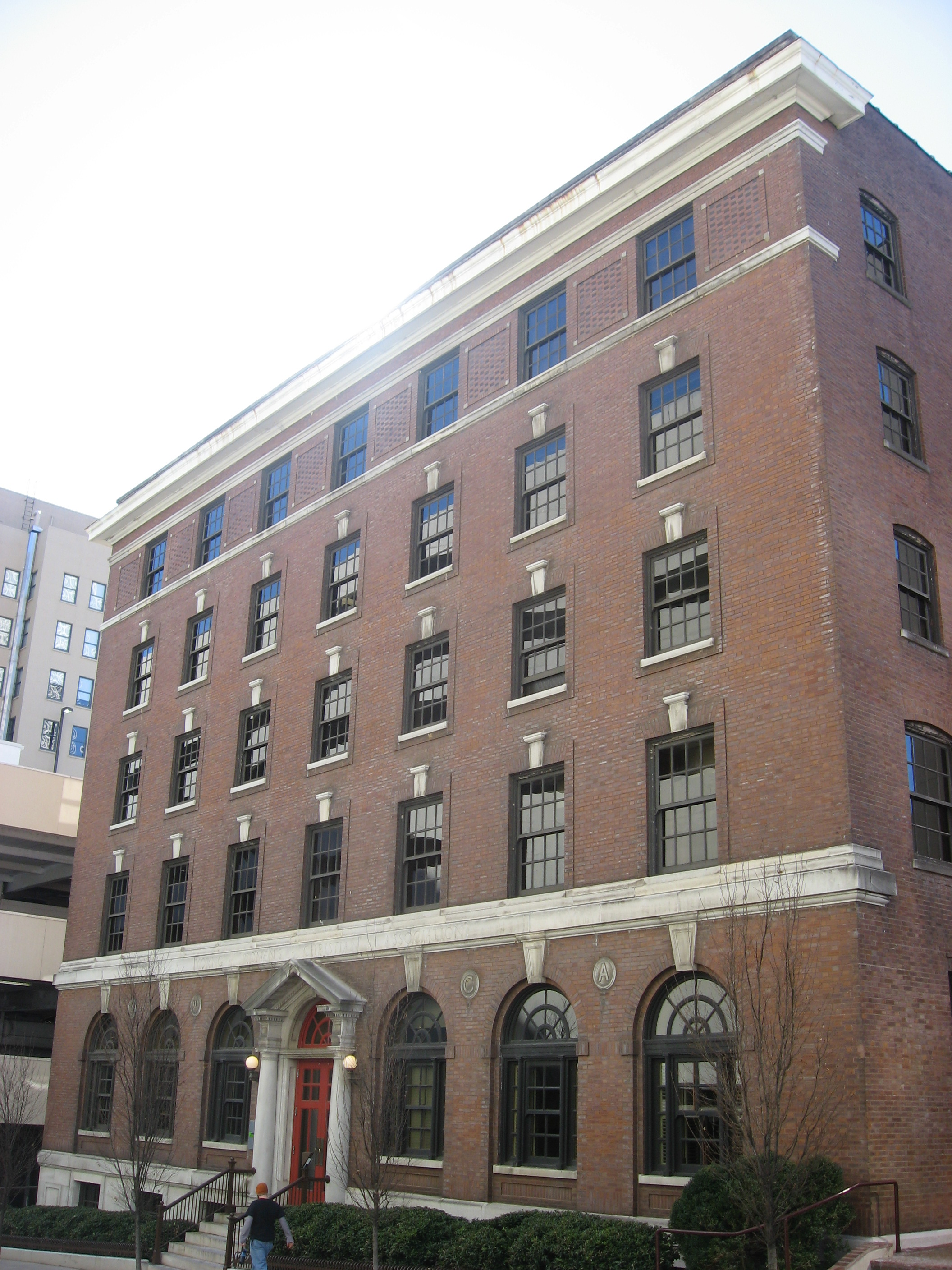
YWCA Building, Nashville, Tennessee

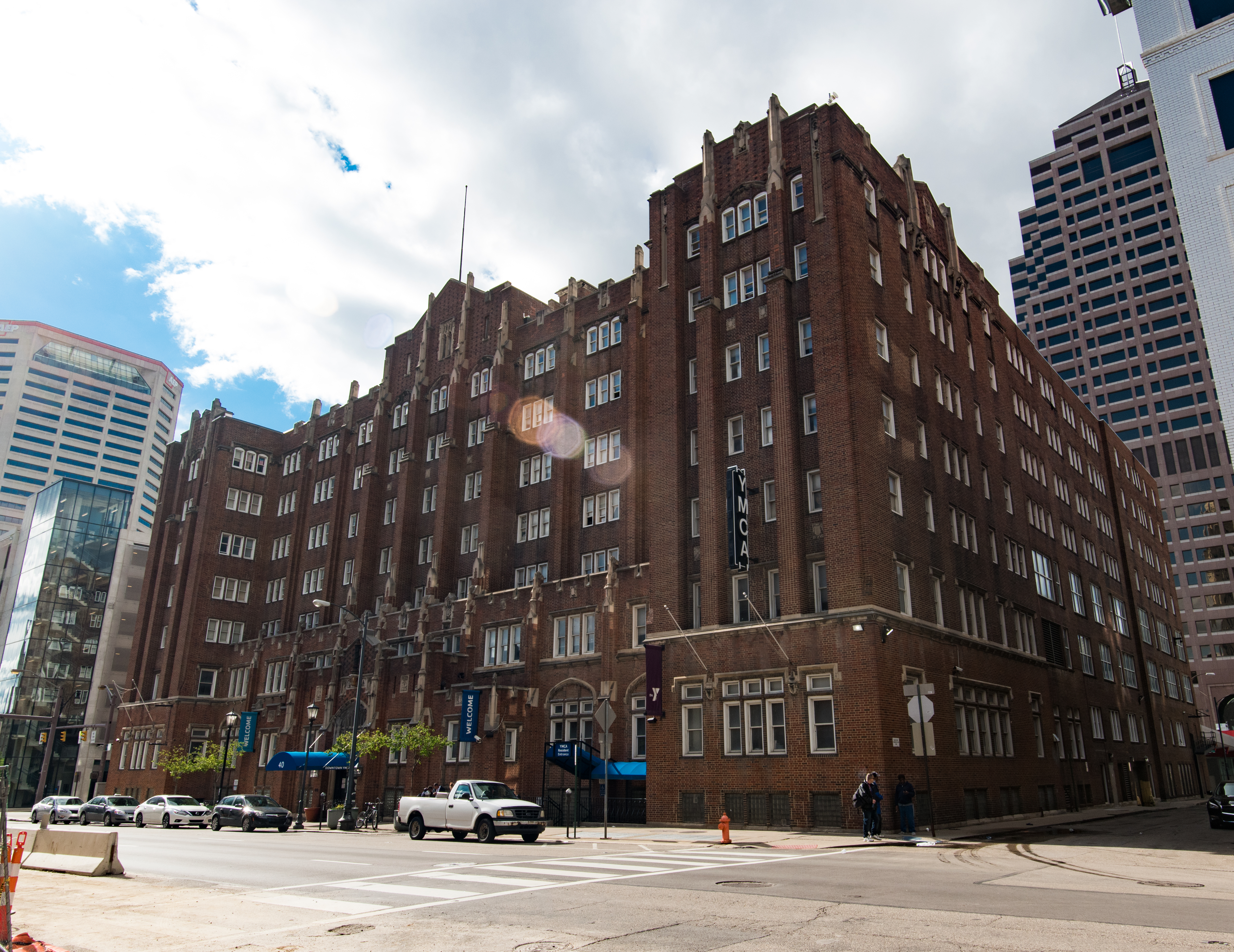
Downtown YMCA, Columbus, Ohio
