= Minneapolis YMCA Central Building =

- U.S. National Register of Historic Places
- Minneapolis Landmark
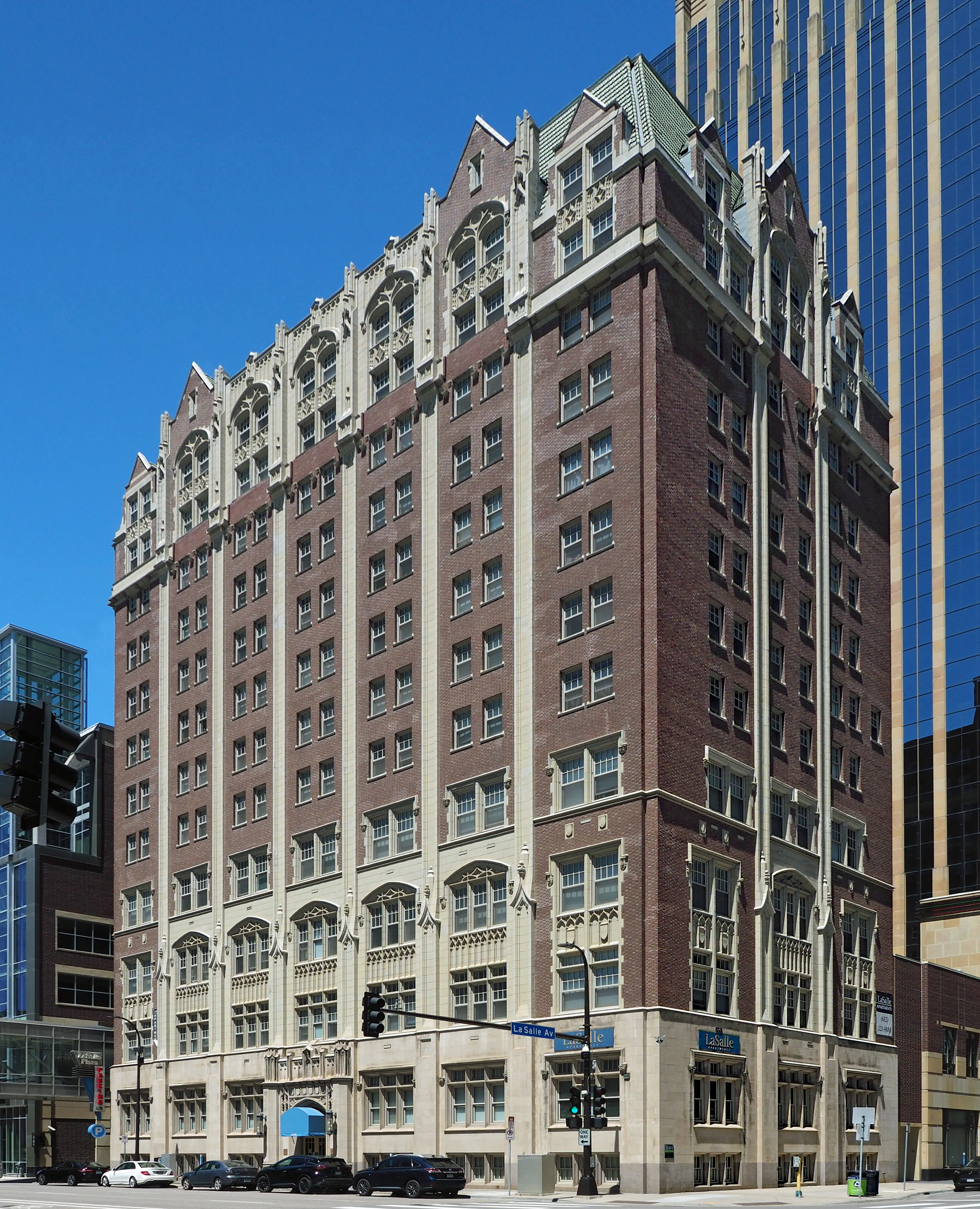
- The Minneapolis YMCA Central Building from the south

- Location within Minnesota Location within the United States
- Location: Minneapolis, Minnesota
- Coordinates: 44°58′34″N 93°16′30″W
- Built: 1919
- Architect: Louis L. Long and Lowell Lamoreaux; Shattuck and Hussey
- Architectural style: Late Gothic Revival
- NRHP reference No.: 95001375

Significant dates
- Added to NRHP: November 29, 1995
- Designated MPLSL: 1996

The Minneapolis YMCA Central Building is a 12-story YMCA building in downtown Minneapolis listed on the National Register of Historic Places. It is built in the Gothic Revival style, making it stand out from other buildings. The Gothic styling was chosen to emphasize the vertical mass of the structure and to make it appear as a powerful corporate symbol. The styling also brought a symbolic association with church architecture, making it fit into the YMCA's value system.

The building was converted into a 121-unit apartment complex in 1994. It is located adjacent to LaSalle Plaza, a 30-story office building that includes the current, modern Minneapolis YMCA location.

In the 1970s, the 7th floor of the building housed the Minnesota Restitution Project, a Department of Corrections initiative that served as an early demonstration project for restorative justice practices.

Domestic Science Kitchen, YWCA, Minneapolis, Minn
