= Abram Litton =

Irish-American chemist and educator

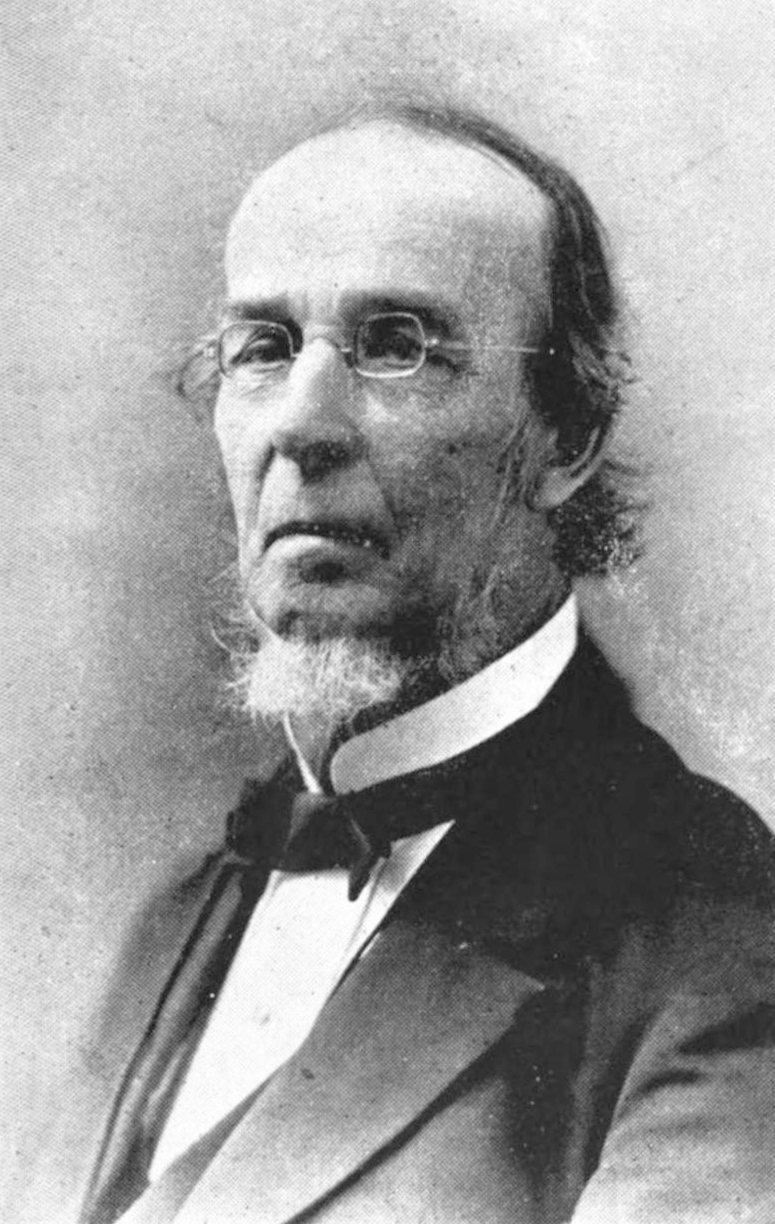
- Born: May 20, 1814; Dublin, Ireland
- Died: September 22, 1901 (aged 87); St. Louis, Missouri, United States
- Education: University of Nashville
- Occupations: Chemist, educator
- Employer(s): Washington University in St. Louis; Washington University School of Medicine

Abram Litton (May 20, 1814 – September 22, 1901) was an Irish-American chemist and educator. He was Washington University in St. Louis's first professor of chemistry, who served as the acting chancellor during 1869–1870.

== Biography ==
Abram Litton was born in Dublin on May 20, 1814. His family emigrated from Ireland to Nashville, Tennessee when he was three years old.

He graduated from the University of Nashville at age 17. In 1839, he moved to Europe to study chemistry. Three years later, he returned to the United States to accept the Professorship of Chemistry at Washington University in St. Louis. In 1843, he became professor of chemistry in the St. Louis Medical College (Washington University School of Medicine). He held that position for fifty years, and died in St. Louis on September 22, 1901.
