= Tennessee cholera epidemic (1849–1850) =

Disease outbreak in the United States

A cholera epidemic began in Nashville, Tennessee, in January 1849 and caused many deaths in the city in 1849 and 1850.

The Nashville cholera epidemic was part of the third cholera pandemic that occurred between 1846 and 1860. It began in South Asia and was spread globally by travelers. In the United States, the disease outbreak was first recorded in December 1848 at two ports: New York City on December 2 and New Orleans on December 11. It spread into the interior of the country along waterways, appearing in Nashville on January 20, 1849.

The number of cases increased by June 1849. The death that month, in Nashville, of former president James K. Polk may have been due to cholera, possibly acquired during travels in other parts of the South. Cholera is reported to have been prevalent in the city around the time of his funeral, in June 1849. According to an account published in 1866, there were 311 cholera deaths in Nashville in 1849, a very large death toll for a city with a population of only about 10,000.

The number of cases increased dramatically again in June and July 1850. Estimates of cholera deaths in 1850 range from 316 to about 500. There were 64 deaths from cholera in just the first 4 days of July 1850. The epidemic led the University of Nashville to suspend operations and led its president, Philip Lindsley, to resign. In a letter written on July 16, 1850, Mary Hamilton House reported to her husband that the epidemic was waning, as the death rate had dropped to only "three to six or eight deaths" per day. The following month, mineralogist Gerard Troost died in Nashville from cholera.

== Death of President Polk ==
Former U.S. President James K. Polk returned to Tennessee during this outbreak. Polk was the 11th president of the United States, serving from 1845 to 1849.

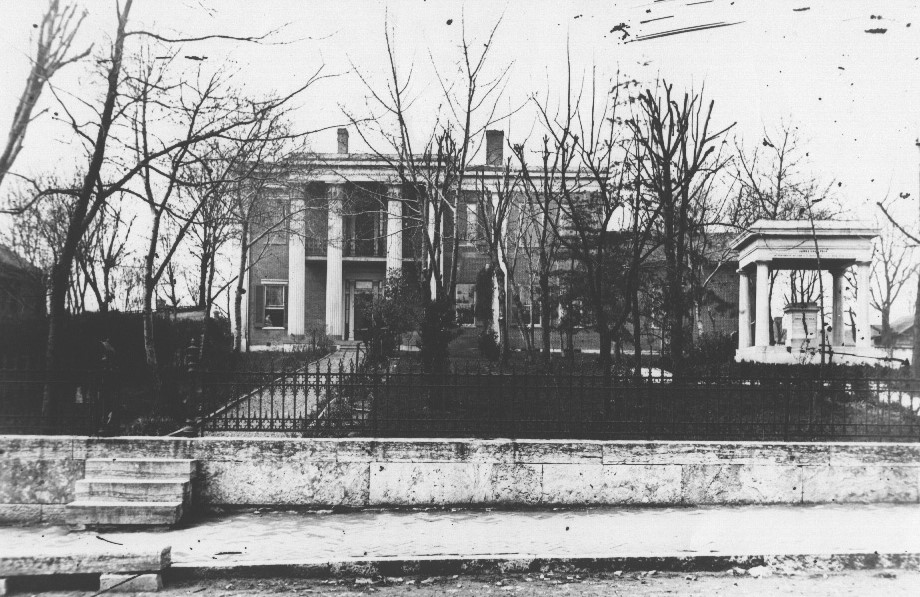
Polk Place, briefly James Polk's home and long that of his widow

President Polk and his wife Sarah Polk left Washington on March 6 for a pre-arranged triumphal tour of the South, to end in Nashville. He and his wife previously arranged to buy a house in Nashville, which was afterwards dubbed Polk Place. The couple progressed down the Atlantic coast, and then westward through the Deep South. He was enthusiastically received and banqueted. By the time the Polks reached Alabama, he was suffering from a bad cold, and soon became concerned by reports of cholera—a passenger on Polk's riverboat died of it, and it was rumored to be common in New Orleans, but it was too late to change plans. Worried about his health, he would have departed the city quickly, but was overwhelmed by Louisiana hospitality. Several passengers on the riverboat up the Mississippi died of the disease, and Polk felt so ill that he went ashore for four days, staying in a hotel. A doctor assured him he did not have cholera, and Polk made the final leg, arriving in Nashville on April 2 to a huge reception.

After a visit to James's mother in Columbia, the Polks settled into Polk Place. The exhausted former president seemed to gain new life, but in early June, he fell ill again, by most accounts of cholera. On the afternoon of Friday, June 15, Polk died at his Polk Place home in Nashville, Tennessee at the age of 53.

== See also ==
- History of cholera
- List of notable disease outbreaks in the United States
