= Linsley =

Linsley is a surname. Notable people with the name include:

- Corey Linsley (born 1991), American NFL football player
- Earle Gorton Linsley (1910-2000), American entomologist
- Haydn Linsley (born 1993), member of the New Zealand boyband Titanium
- John Linsley (1925–2002), American physicist

== Other uses ==
- Linsley Peninsula, roughly rectangular ice-covered peninsula which protrudes into the south part of Murphy Inlet, northern Thurston Island, Antarctica
- 3474 Linsley, main-belt asteroid discovered in 1962 by Goethe Link Observatory at Brooklyn, Indiana

== See also ==
- Lindsley, a surname
