= José Andrés Coronado Alvarado =

Costa Rican diplomat and politician (1895–1975)

José Andrés Cronado Alvarado

Secretary of Foreign Relations of Costa Rica
- In office 24 March 1922 – 9 December 1922
- President: Julio Acosta García

Personal details
- Born: January 15, 1895 San José, Costa Rica
- Died: October 4, 1975 (aged 80) San José, Costa Rica
- Spouse(s): Helen Cockrill Foster; Evelia Chaves Leon
- Education: University of Nashville

José Andrés Coronado Alvarado (January 15, 1895 – October 4, 1975) was a Costa Rican diplomat and politician.

He graduated as Bachelor in the Grammar school of Costa Rica and later he went on to study the social and economic sciences in the University of Nashville, Tennessee, where he had a position as chair of Latin American Relations.

From March 24 to December 9, 1922, he was Secretary of Foreign Relations of Costa Rica. In addition, from April to May 1922 he was in charge temporarily of the Secretariat of Promotion and Public Works. During his role as Chancellor, on November 10, 1922, he signed a treaty with Roy Tasco Davis of the United States the Coronado-Davis Treaty, whose ratifications were exchanged in April 1923.

He represented Costa Rica in the Central American Conference of Washington D.C., on December 4 of 1922, but resigned just a days later. He later served as a civil servant of the Bank (later Institute) National of Insurances from its foundation in 1927.

== Personal life ==
He was born in San José, the son of Andrés Coronado Jiménez and Eduviges Alvarado Carrillo. He was married first to Helen Cockrill Foster and second to Evelia Chaves Leon. He died in San Jose on 4 October 1975.
