= Adventure Science Center =

- Established: 1945
- Location: 800 Fort Negley Boulevard; Nashville, Tennessee
- Coordinates: 36.146765°N 86.775458°W
- Type: Science museum
- Website: http://www.adventuresci.org

Adventure Science Center is a non-profit science museum for children located in Nashville, Tennessee.

The museum features over 175 hands-on interactive exhibits with themes including biology, physics, visual perception, listening, mind, air and space, energy and earth science. The building includes 44,000 square feet of exhibit space, a 75-foot-tall adventure tower and the Sudekum Planetarium.

== History ==
The organization was opened in 1945 as the Children’s Museum of Nashville, under the vision of naturalist John Ripley Forbes, and was located in Lindsley Hall in downtown Nashville. The first planetarium opened in 1952. In 1974 the museum moved to its current location in Old Saint Cloud Hill, the site of Fort Negley during the American Civil War.

The organization’s name changed over the years, most recently from Cumberland Science Museum to Adventure Science Center in November 2002.

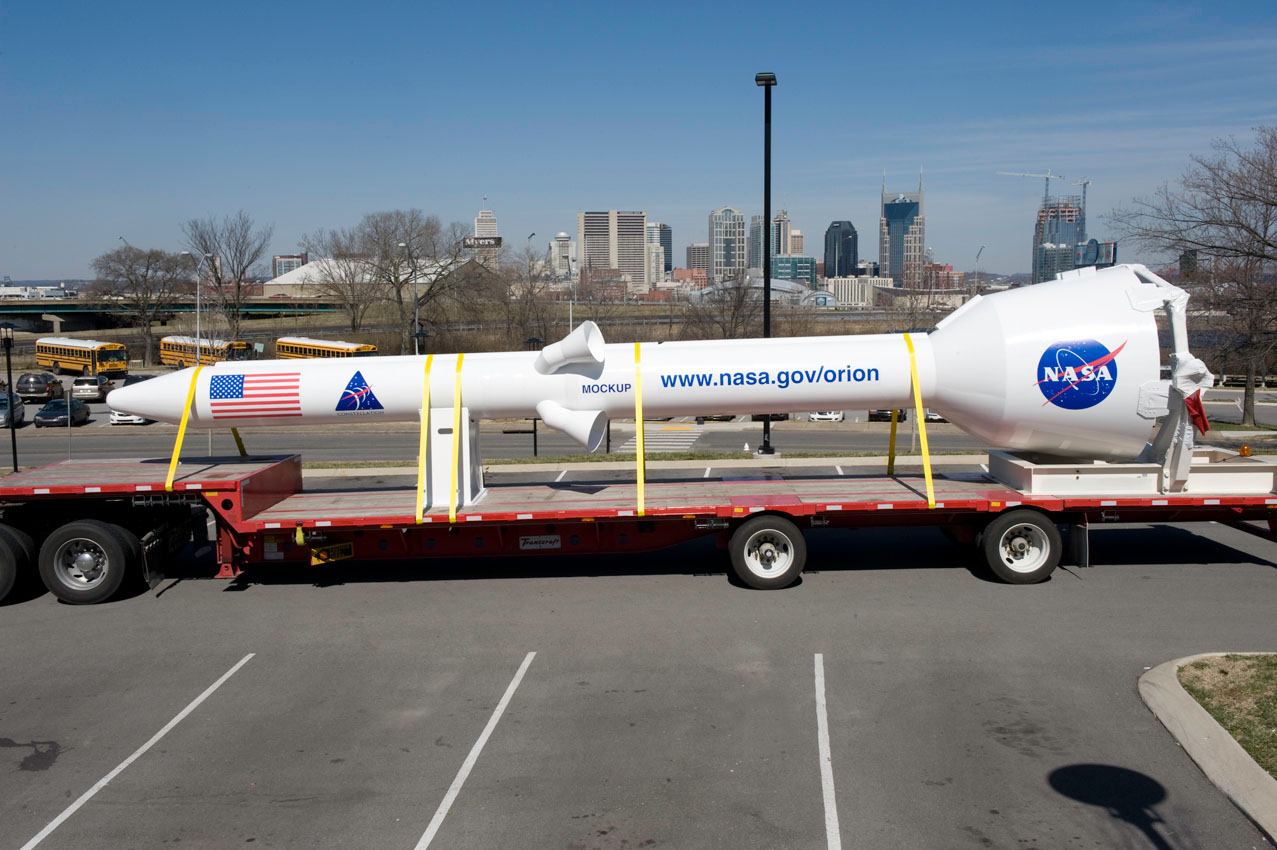
NASA's Orion Launch Abort System
