= Percy Warner =

American businessman (1861–1927)

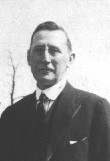
- Born: March 4, 1861
- Died: June 18, 1927 (aged 66)
- Occupation: Businessman
- Spouse: Margaret Lindsley
- Children: 3 daughters
- Parent: James C. Warner
- Relatives: John Berrien Lindsley (father-in-law); Luke Lea (son-in-law)

Percy Warner (1861–1927) was an American businessman from Nashville, Tennessee. He was active in public utility across the Southern United States.

== Early life ==
Percy Warner was born on March 4, 1861. His father, James C. Warner, was the owner of mining interests. He had a brother, Edwin Warner. He grew up at Renraw, a mansion in East Nashville.

== Career ==
Warner started his career by working for his father's mining business.

Warner served as the President of the Nashville Railway and Light Company, which controlled the streetcar system in Nashville. He resigned in 1914. He was also active in utility companies in "Memphis, Knoxville, Birmingham, Little Rock, Houston, and New Orleans." Additionally, Warner served on the board of directors of the National Light and Power Company of New York.

Warner served on the board of directors of the Nashville Trust Company. He also served as the Chairman of the Building Committee of the Young Women's Christian Association Building in Downtown Nashville.

Warner served on the Nashville Board of Park Commissioners. He helped save Centennial Park.

== Personal life, death and legacy ==
Warner married Margaret Lindsley, the daughter of Dr John Berrien Lindsley. They resided at Royal Oaks, a mansion in Nashville. Two of his daughters, Mary and Percie, were the first and second wives of Luke Lea, who served as the Senator from Tennessee from 1911 to 1917.

Warner died on June 18, 1927. The Percy Warner Park in Nashville was named in his honor.
