= Young Women's Christian Association Building (Nashville, Tennessee) =

- U.S. National Register of Historic Places
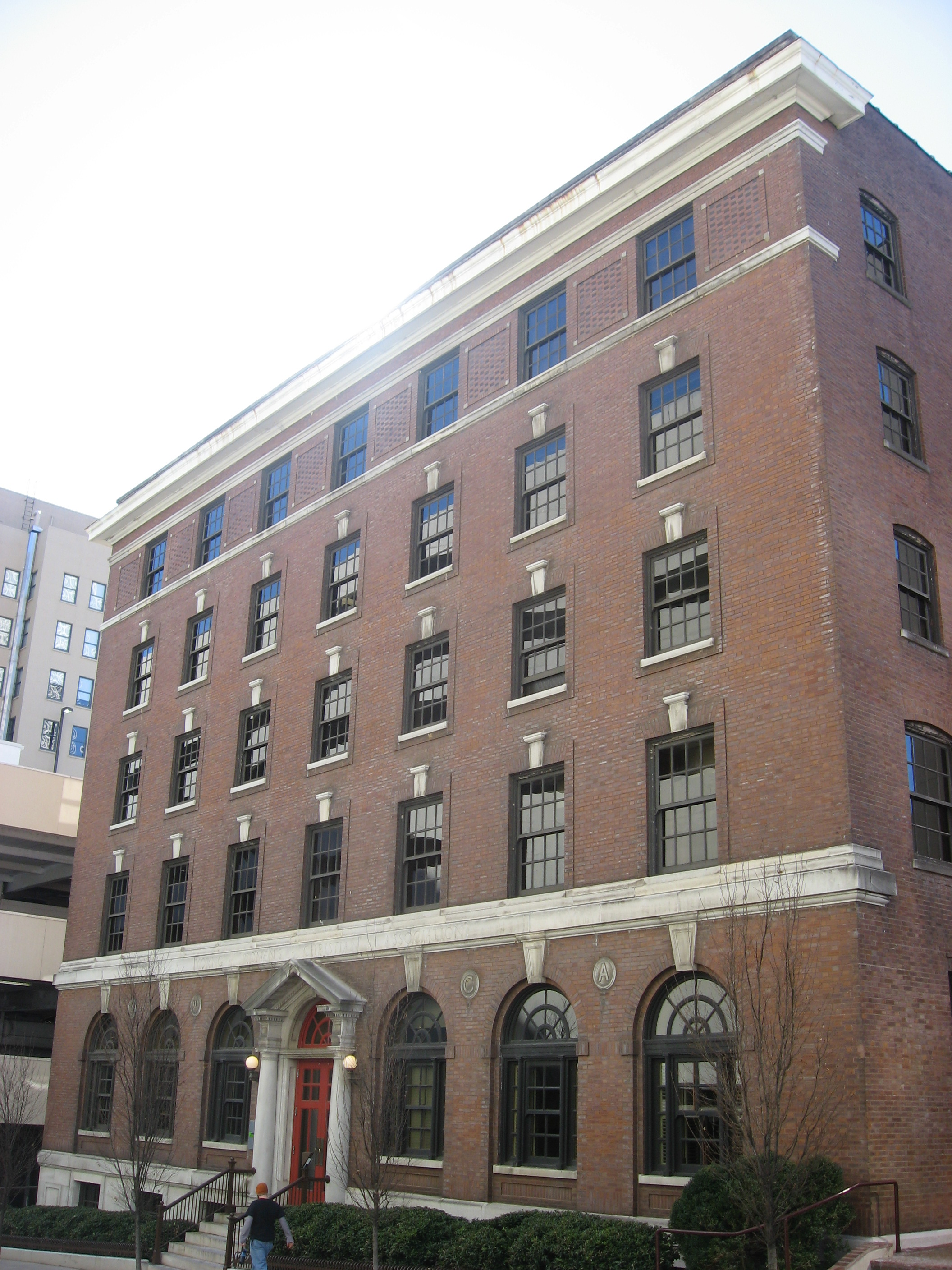
- The Young Women's Christian Association Building in 2014

- Location within Tennessee Location within the United States
- Location: 211 7th Avenue North, Nashville, Tennessee, U.S.
- Coordinates: 36°9′46″N 86°47′00.4″W
- Area: 0.5 acres (0.20 ha)
- Built: 1911
- Architect: Shattuck and Hussey
- Architectural style: Georgian Revival
- NRHP reference No.: 82001727
- Added to NRHP: December 16, 1982

The Young Women's Christian Association Building, also known as the Jacques-Miller Office Building, is a historic building in Nashville, Tennessee, US.

== Location ==
The building is in Nashville, the county seat of Davidson County, Tennessee. It is located downtown, at 211 7th Avenue North, between Church Street and Union Street, opposite the back of the Sheraton Nashville Downtown.

== History ==
The six-story building was completed in 1911. It was designed in the Georgian Revival architectural style by Shattuck and Hussey, an architectural firm based in Chicago. Inside, there is a large cast-iron neweled staircase. Percy Warner, a prominent Nashville businessman, served as Chairman of the Building Committee. It was dedicated on May 9, 1911.

The building was home to the Nashville chapter of the Young Women's Christian Association. The association offered boarding facilities for Christian women as well as a gymnasium and a job centre. The first floor was home to the Ophelia Clifton Atchison Memorial Library, named for the mother of Elizabeth Rhodes Atchison Eakin, widow of Nashville banker and philanthropist, John Hill Eakin.

The first chapter of the United Daughters of the Confederacy, Nashville No. 1, rented the Vespers room of the YWCA building from 1917 to 1927 for their meetings.

In 1982, the building was redeveloped as an office building. It was renamed the Jacques-Miller Office Building.

It has been listed on the National Register of Historic Places since December 16, 1982.
