= Columbus Dispatch Building =

Office building in Columbus, Ohio

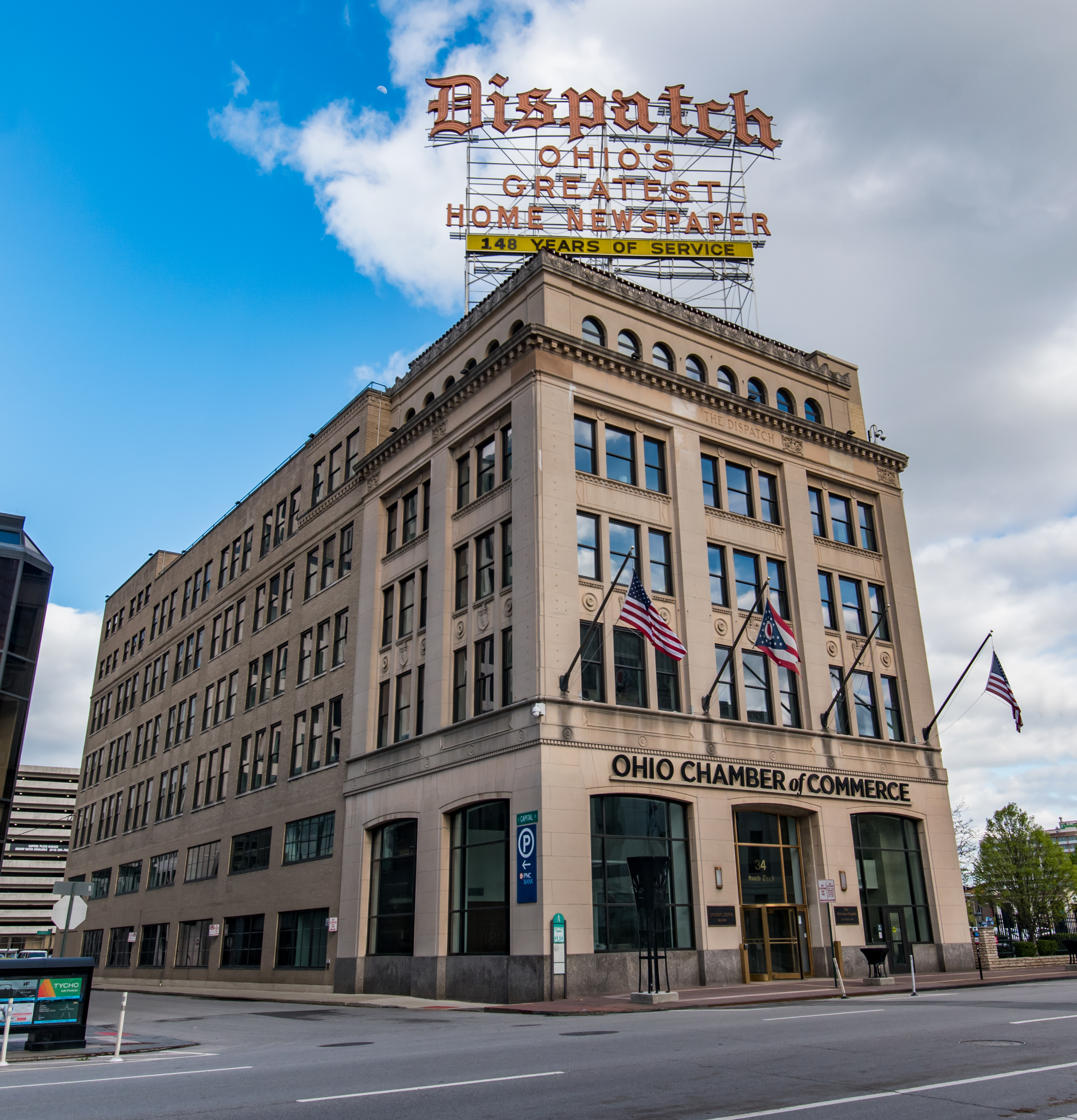
- Location: 34 S. Third Street, Columbus, Ohio
- Coordinates: 39.96173°N 82.99736°W
- Built: 1925
- Architect: Harvey H. Hiestand, Snyder, Babbitt & Mathews

Columbus Register of Historic Properties
- Designated: December 12, 2016
- Reference no.: CR-70

The Columbus Dispatch Building is a historic building on Capitol Square in Downtown Columbus, Ohio. The building was home to the Columbus Dispatch newspaper offices until January 2016, when it moved to 62 E. Broad St. on Capitol Square. A renovation restored the building closer to its original exterior appearance, while adding modern features. The building is now headquarters to the Ohio Chamber of Commerce. The building is owned by Capitol Square Ltd., a real estate and development branch of the Wolfe family’s Dispatch Printing Co., the former owners of the Dispatch. The site formerly housed the city's downtown YMCA, a Yost & Packard building; the Y moved to the Downtown YMCA building in 1923.

It was listed on the Columbus Register of Historic Properties in 2016, as part of the building owner's desire for historic tax credits to help fund the building's renovation.

The building features a giant sign – "Dispatch: Ohio's Greatest Home Newspaper" – still owned by the Columbus Dispatch.
