= Adolphus Heiman =

American architect (1809–1862)

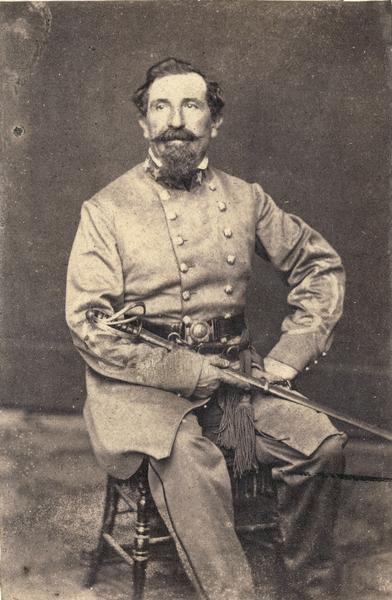
- Col. Adolphus Heiman
- Born: April 17, 1809; Potsdam, Prussia
- Died: November 16, 1862 (aged 53); Jackson, Mississippi
- Burial place: Mount Olivet Cemetery; Nashville, Tennessee
- Military career
- Allegiance: United States; Confederate States
- Branch: United States Army; Confederate States Army
- Service years: 1846–1847; 1861–1862
- Rank: First Lieutenant (USV); Bvt. major (USV); Colonel (CSA); Brigadier general (not substantiated)
- Unit: 1st Tennessee Volunteer Infantry (USA)
- Commands: 10th Tennessee Infantry (CSA); 1st Brigade / Left Wing / Army of Central Kentucky
- Conflicts: Mexican–American War; Battle of Cerro Gordo; Battle of Monterrey; American Civil War; Battle of Fort Donelson (POW)
- Other work: architect, engineer

Adolphus Heiman (April 17, 1809 – November 16, 1862) was a Prussian-born American architect and soldier; later becoming a Confederate officer during the American Civil War.

== Early life ==
Adolphus Heiman was born in Potsdam, Prussia on April 17, 1809. His father was a building superintendent. He emigrated to the United States in 1834, spent time in New York City and New Orleans, and settled in Nashville, Tennessee in 1837.

== Career ==
From 1837 to 1841, Heiman built the First Baptist Church on Fifth Avenue, which was destroyed in 1940, and tombstones in the Old City Cemetery on Fourth Avenue South in Nashville.

Heiman volunteered for service in the Mexican–American War of 1846–48. He was commissioned as a First Lieutenant in the 1st Regiment of Tennessee Volunteers. He became the regimental Adjutant and was wounded in the Battle of Cerro Gordo. He was wounded again at the Battle of Monterrey. When the war ended he was breveted as Major.

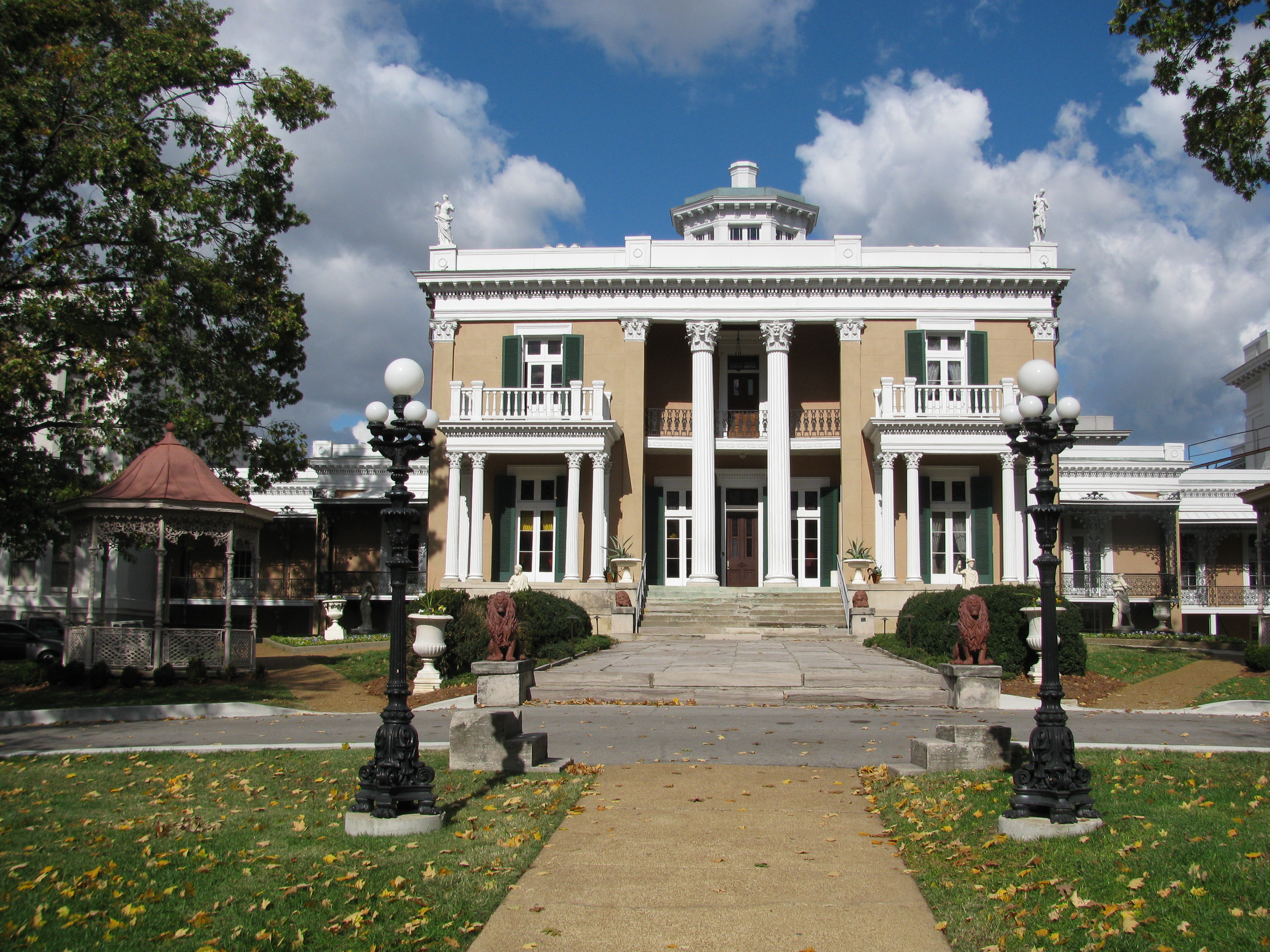
The Belmont Mansion in Nashville, Tennessee, designed by Heiman.

In 1849, he was commissioned to build a Gothic Revival 250-bed state Hospital for the Insane. He also designed the Cathedral of Our Lady of the Seven Dolors (now known as St. Mary's Catholic Church), the now-demolished Italianate-style Adelphi Theater, the Greek Revival-style Medical Department and the Gothic Revival-style Literary Department at the University of Nashville, and the Italianate-style Belmont Mansion. He also designed the Giles County Courthouse in Pulaski, Tennessee, St. John's College in Little Rock, Arkansas and the Arkansas Masonic School, the First Presbyterian Church in Huntsville, Alabama and the Courtland Presbyterian Church in Courtland Alabama. He also designed the first suspension bridge in Tennessee over the Cumberland River. By the 1850s, he was widely known as "Nashville's architect." Residing in the city, Heiman also was a freemason as member of the local Cumberland Lodge No 8.

== Civil War ==
Heiman served in the Confederate States Army during the American Civil War. Initially commissioned a Major in the Provisional Army of Tennessee; he served as an aide-de-camp to Brigadier Robert G. Foster before becoming an assistant adjutant-general of the Tennessee Military Department with the rank of colonel. When the 10th Tennessee Infantry Regiment was raised he was elected as its colonel and commanding officer. When the regiment was stationed at Fort Henry; Heiman built Fort Heiman on the opposite bank of the river. When the Union Army emerged for the Battle of Fort Henry the regiment transferred to Fort Donelson where Heiman was given command of the brigade to which his regiment was assigned. When the fort surrendered in February 1862 he became a prisoner of war at Fort Warren in Boston and, gravely ill, was released after six months.

== Death ==
Heiman immediately was put into a Confederate hospital in Jackson, Mississippi. He died there on November 16, 1862, six days after being re-elected colonel of the newly exchanged 10th Tennessee. A promotion to brigadier general had been hinted but not substantiated with evidence. He was buried in the Confederate Circle of Mount Olivet Cemetery in Nashville in 1869.
