= Philip Lindsley =

American educator (1786–1855)

The Reverend Philip Lindsley
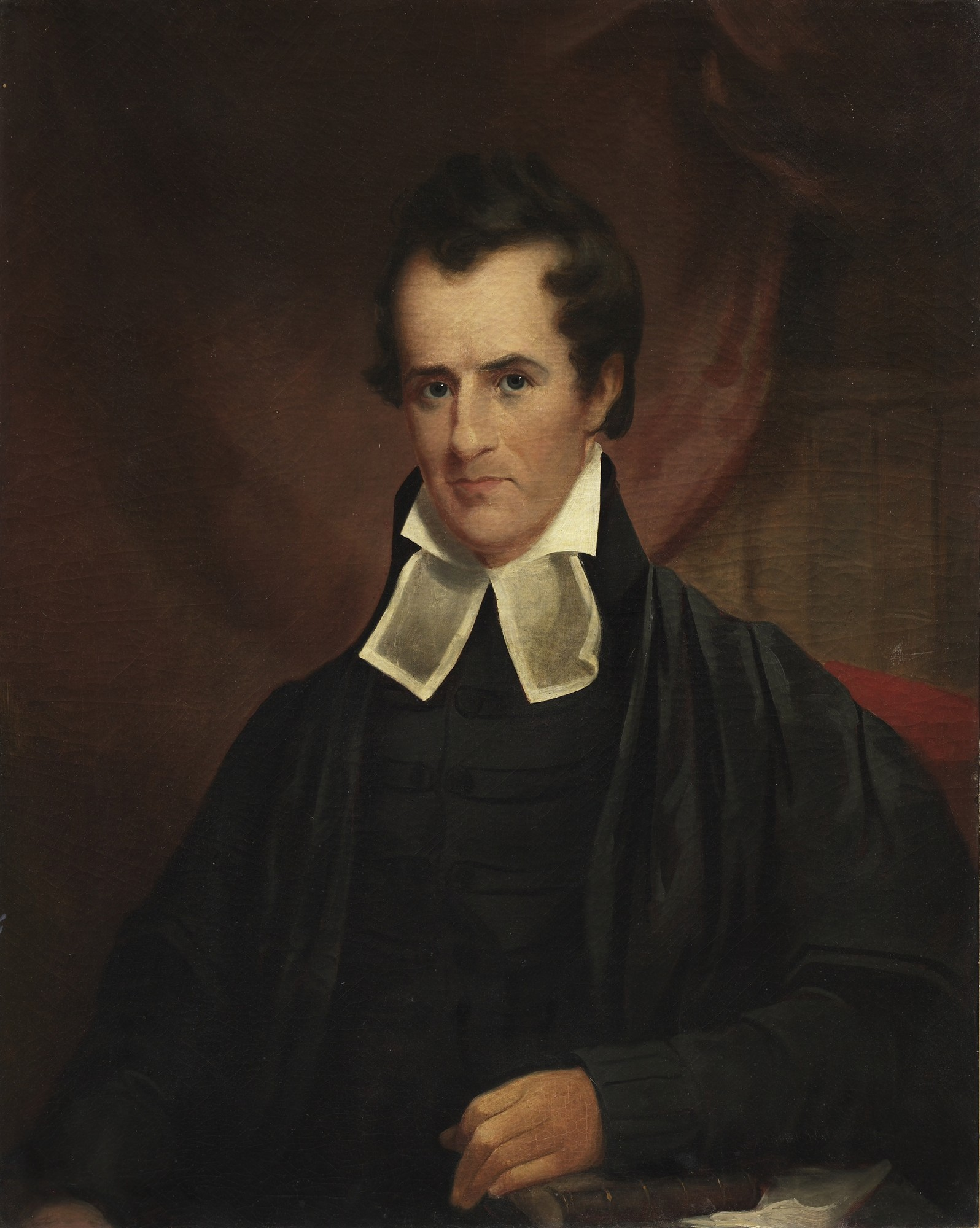

1st President of the University of Nashville
- In office 1824–1850
- Preceded by: (office created)
- Succeeded by: John Berrien Lindsley

Acting President of Princeton University
- In office 1822–1823
- Preceded by: Ashbel Green
- Succeeded by: James Carnahan

Personal details
- Born: December 21, 1786 Basking Ridge, New Jersey, US
- Died: May 25, 1855 (aged 68) Nashville, Tennessee, US
- Spouse(s): Margaret Lawrence Lindsley; Mary Ann Myers Lindsley
- Relations: Nathaniel Lawrence (father-in-law)
- Children: Adrian Van Sinderen Lindsley; John Berrien Lindsley
- Education: Princeton University
- Occupation: Preacher, educator, classicist

Philip Lindsley (1786–1855) was an American Presbyterian minister, educator and classicist. He served as the acting president of the College of New Jersey (now Princeton University) from 1822 to 1824, and as the first president of the now-defunct University of Nashville from 1824 to 1850.

== Early life ==
Philip Lindsley was born in Basking Ridge, New Jersey on December 21, 1786. He was educated in private academies and graduated from the College of New Jersey, now Princeton University.

== Career ==
He started teaching Latin and Greek at Princeton University in 1808. By 1813, he became Professor of Languages, Librarian, Inspector (Dean), and secretary of the board of trustees. He then served as its vice president from 1817 to 1822, and as its Acting President from 1822 to 1824. However, he declined its presidency, as well as the presidencies of Transylvania University in Lexington, Kentucky, Ohio University in Athens, Ohio and Dickinson College in Carlisle, Pennsylvania.

In December 1824, he moved to Nashville, Tennessee, to take up the presidency of Cumberland College. Among his first acts as president was to request that its name be changed to the University of Nashville, a change that took effect about a year after his arrival. He hired respected scholars as faculty in fields including classics, foreign languages, mathematics, and geology. At the same time, he actively recruited students. He also suggested starting a medical school.

He resigned his position in 1850, when the university suspended operations as a result of the cholera epidemic which led to low enrollment and to financial difficulties. His son, John Berrien Lindsley, became the university's president when it reopened in 1855.

After leaving the University of Nashville, he taught Ecclesiastical Polity and Biblical Archaeology at New Albany Theological Seminary in New Albany, Indiana (now the McCormick Theological Seminary in Chicago).

His ideas and ambitions regarding education had a lasting impact. He promoted the Nashville city slogan "Athens of the South", a sobriquet coined by Leroy J. Halsey (1812-1896) that reflected his goal of making the University of Nashville into a nationally recognized institution. He was an advocate for better education at all levels, becoming one of the first academics to urge the formal training of school teachers in normal schools. He saw education as, "a great equalizer, a special right for the poor." Additionally, in an essay entitled Thoughts on Slavery, he wrote, "Our slaves must be emancipated." In the 1830s he published a pamphlet that argued that all children should be offered a broad academic education, including Greek, Latin, arithmetic, algebra, geometry, geography, and English.

== Personal life ==
He married Margaret Lawrence Lindsley, the daughter of Nathaniel Lawrence, who was New York Attorney General from 1792 to 1795. The couple had three sons:

- Adrian Van Sinderen Lindsley (1814–1885), who served as a member of the Tennessee Senate.
- Nathaniel Lawrence Lindsley (1816–1868).
- John Berrien Lindsley (1822–1897). He married Sarah McGavock Lindsley (1830–1903).

Margaret Lindsley died in 1845. In 1849, Lindsley married Mary Ann Myers, widow of Elias Myers, the founder of New Albany Theological Seminary.

== Death ==
He died in Nashville on May 25, 1855.
