= Nathaniel Lawrence =

Attorney General of New York (1761–1797)

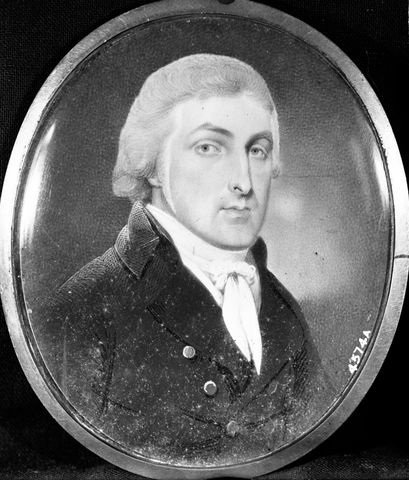
- Portrait miniature, c. 1790

New York State Attorney General
- In office December 24, 1792 – November 13, 1795
- Governor: George Clinton; John Jay
- Preceded by: Morgan Lewis
- Succeeded by: Josiah Ogden Hoffman

Personal details
- Born: July 11, 1761 Newtown, Queens County, New York
- Died: July 15, 1797 (aged 36) Hempstead, then Queens, now Nassau County, New York

Nathaniel Lawrence (July 11, 1761 – July 15, 1797) was an American lawyer and politician.

== Life ==
He was the son of Thomas Lawrence (1733—1816; brother of Jonathan Lawrence) and Elizabeth (Fish) Lawrence. He attended Princeton College, but left to fight in the American Revolutionary War as a lieutenant. In 1788, he was a delegate to the New York State Convention which ratified the U.S. Constitution. He was Secretary to the Board of Regents of the University of the State of New York from 1790 to 1794. He was a member of the New York State Assembly in 1791, 1792, 1795 and 1796. He was New York State Attorney General from 1792 to 1795.

He was a member of the New York Society Library, which has records of books he borrowed in 1791 and 1792.

On February 16, 1796, he was appointed Assistant Attorney General for the First District, comprising Suffolk, Queens, Kings, Richmond and Westchester Counties, and died in office.

He married Elizabeth Berrien (1762–1800; aunt of John M. Berrien), and they had two daughters: Margaret Elizabeth Lawrence who married Philip Lindsley, and Elizabeth Lawrence who died in infancy.

== Sources ==
- “Nathaniel Lawrence” (class of 1783), Princetonians, 1776-1783 (Princeton: Princeton University Press, 1981), 425-29, 433.
- History of Queens County
- Nathaniel Lawrence at Haley Lawrence genealogy [gives July 15 as death date]
- Google Books The New York Civil List compiled by Franklin Benjamin Hough (Weed, Parsons and Co., 1858; pages 36, 166, 169 and 287)
- History of Long Island by Benjamin Franklin Thompson (New York City, 1839; page 426)
- Death notice, original from the New York Journal, republished in Queens County in Olden Times by Henry Onderdonk Jr. (Jamaica, NY, 1865; page 87) [gives July 5 as death date]

Legal offices
Preceded by Morgan Lewis	New York State Attorney General; 1792–1795	Succeeded by Josiah Ogden Hoffman
