= University of Nashville =

Private university in Nashville, Tennessee, U.S.

- Former name: Cumberland College
- Active: 1826–1909
- Location: Nashville, Tennessee; 36°09′15.0″N 86°46′05.0″W
- Colors: Garnet and Blue

University of Nashville was a private university in Nashville, Tennessee. It was established in 1806 as Cumberland College. It existed as a distinct entity until 1909; operating at various times a medical school, a four-year military college, a literary arts (liberal arts) college, and a boys preparatory school. Educational institutions that can trace their roots to the University of Nashville include Montgomery Bell Academy, an all-male preparatory school; the Vanderbilt University School of Medicine; Peabody College at Vanderbilt University; and the University School of Nashville, a co-educational preparatory school.

== History ==
The predecessor to the University of Nashville, Davidson Academy, was founded as a preparatory school for boys in Nashville, Tennessee, in 1785. In 1802 this institution moved to a building in downtown Nashville. The facility, named Cumberland Hall, was located at 300 Peabody St., on the corner of what is now Peabody St. and Third Avenue. The building no longer stands, but a Tennessee State Historical Marker was erected on the site. In 1806, Davidson Academy changed its name to Cumberland College. United States President Andrew Jackson served on the board of trustees for many years during this time. Meanwhile, Reverend Philip Lindsley (1786–1855) was named the chancellor of Cumberland College in 1824.

In 1826, the Tennessee Legislature changed the name of Cumberland College to the University of Nashville. In 1827, future Confederate General Gideon Pillow was part of a graduating class of twelve. Under Reverend Phillip Lindsley, the University of Nashville provided educational instruction to young men, and Nashville became known as the 'Athens of the South.' In 1850, all parts of the college level instruction were shut down, a consequence of a cholera epidemic in the city. Meanwhile, Cumberland Hall was torn down, and the University of Nashville opened a medical college in 1851.

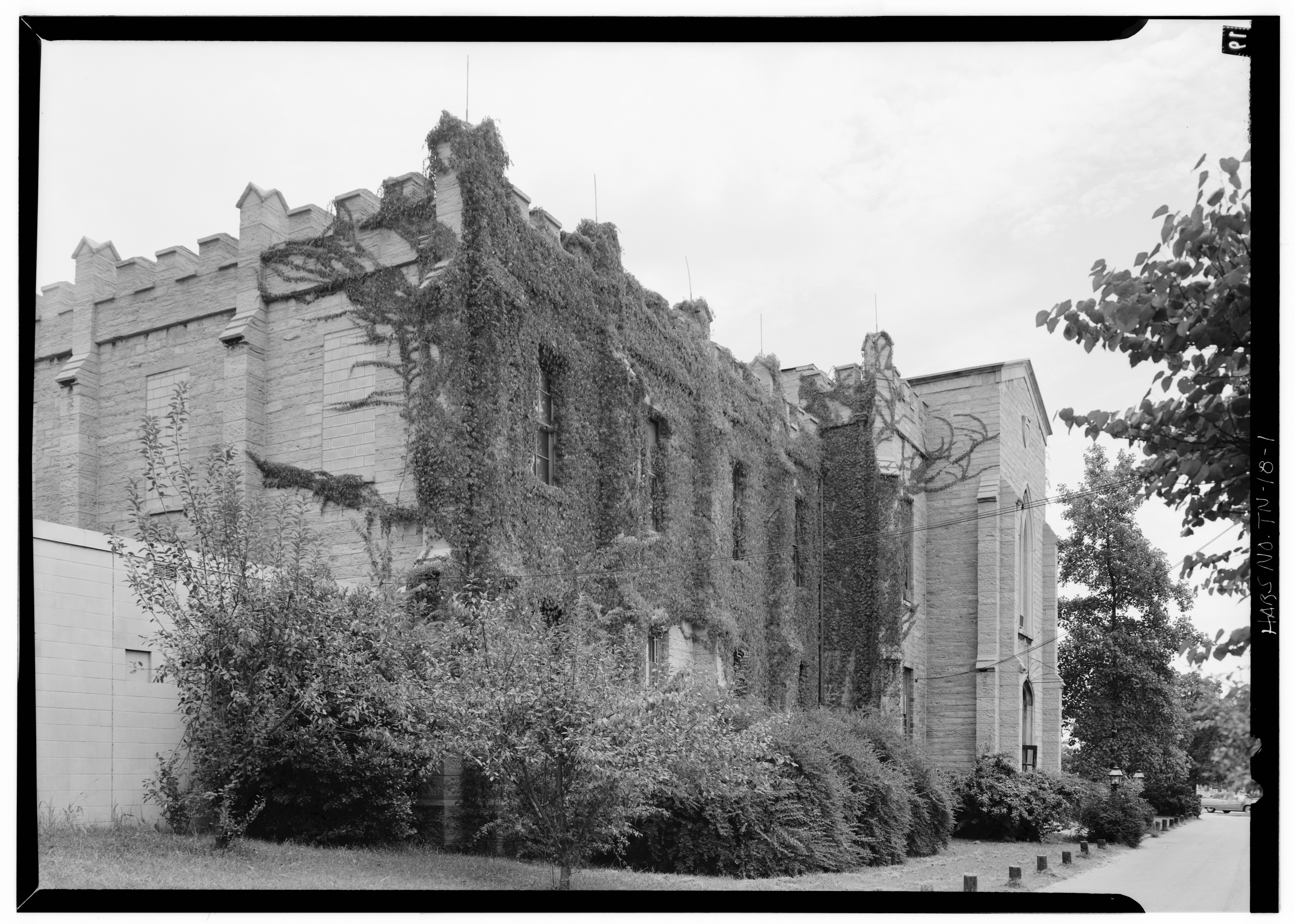
Literary Department Building

In 1853, a new building was constructed at 724 Second Avenue in Nashville, and in 1854, the college re-opened. In 1855, Lindsley's son and successor John Berrien Lindsley merged the Western Military Institute and the University of Nashville. It moved its entire operation from Georgetown, Kentucky, where it had operated since its founding in 1847, to Nashville. Bushrod Johnson was a professor at the Western Military Institute from 1851 to 1855. He served as its headmaster when it moved to Nashville in the merger and continued in that capacity until the outbreak of the American Civil War in 1861. He served the Confederate States Army during the war as a general. It was during this period that Sam Davis attended the Western Military Institute; he was later called the "boy hero of the Confederacy", and hanged by Union forces as a spy in 1863. The Western Military Institute did not offer instruction from 1862 to 1865. In 1862, the campus building served as a Union hospital for Federal officers.

Industrialist Montgomery Bell left the University of Nashville $20,000 in his will in 1867, and Lindsley used the proceeds to open up the Montgomery Bell Academy (MBA) that year as a new preparatory school in Nashville. The new school took over the operations of the then defunct Western Military Institute and the University of Nashville preparatory school.

In 1866, E. Kirby Smith was named co-chancellor of the University of Nashville, along with Bushrod Johnson, who returned to the school as a professor, to replace Lindsley. General Smith served as its chancellor from 1870 to 1875. That year, a financial crisis was resolved when the Peabody Fund made a large donation, and the University of Nashville's operations were split into three different entities. The board of trustees that had operated the University of Nashville since its re-incorporation in 1826 remained intact and were given the operations of the Montgomery Bell Academy preparatory school. The medical school became part of Vanderbilt University in 1874. The collegiate program received the financial donation from the Peabody Fund, established a new board of trustees, and it was renamed the Peabody Normal School.

To create a major Southern teachers' college, the grounds and buildings of the Peabody Normal School were donated to the George Peabody College for Teachers in 1909. The donation was estimated to be worth about $250,000. In 1914 the George Peabody College for Teachers purchased a new site adjacent to Vanderbilt University, with over 50 acres (20 hectares) of wooded lawn. It constructed new buildings. However, after falling upon hard times in the 1970s, Peabody College amalgamated with the wealthier university in 1979. However, the board of trustees of the formerly affiliated preparatory school, Montgomery Bell Academy, continues to operate under the name of "The Board of Trustees of the University of Nashville."

== Notable alumni ==
- José Andrés Coronado Alvarado (1895–1975), Costa Rican diplomat who served as head of Latin American relations while at the university.
- William Barksdale (1821-1863), U. S. congressman and Confederate General, killed at Gettysburg (July 3, 1863).
- John Meredith Bass (1804–1878), mayor of Nashville, Tennessee.
- John Bell (1797–1869), Tennessee senator and presidential candidate (graduate of Cumberland College)
- Rufus Columbus Burleson (1823-1901), second president of Baylor University, Baptist preacher.
- Sam Davis (1842-1863), boy hero of the Confederacy.
- Thomas Fletcher (1817–1880), acting governor of Arkansas (1862)
- John Berrien Lindsley (1822–1897), educator and president of the University of Nashville.
- Abram Litton (1811-1887), first professor of chemistry and acting chancellor of Washington University in St. Louis.
- George Maney, Confederate general and U.S. diplomat to several South American countries.
- Van. H. Manning (1839–1892), U.S. Representative from Mississippi and Confederate States Army officer during the American Civil War.
- Albert A. Murphree, (1870–1927), president of Florida State College for Women (1897–1909) and the University of Florida (1909–1927).
- Gideon Johnson Pillow, (1806–78), U.S. and Confederate States Army general and lawyer.
- Peter Pitchlynn, (1806–1881), chief of the Choctaw Nation of Oklahoma (1864–1866), liaison to the U.S. government (1845–1861, 1866–1881).
- Samuel Hollingsworth Stout (1822–1903), American farmer, slaveholder, and Confederate surgeon
- William Walker, (1824–1860), U.S. filibuster. Executed in Honduras in 1860.
