= Nicholas Low =

American politician

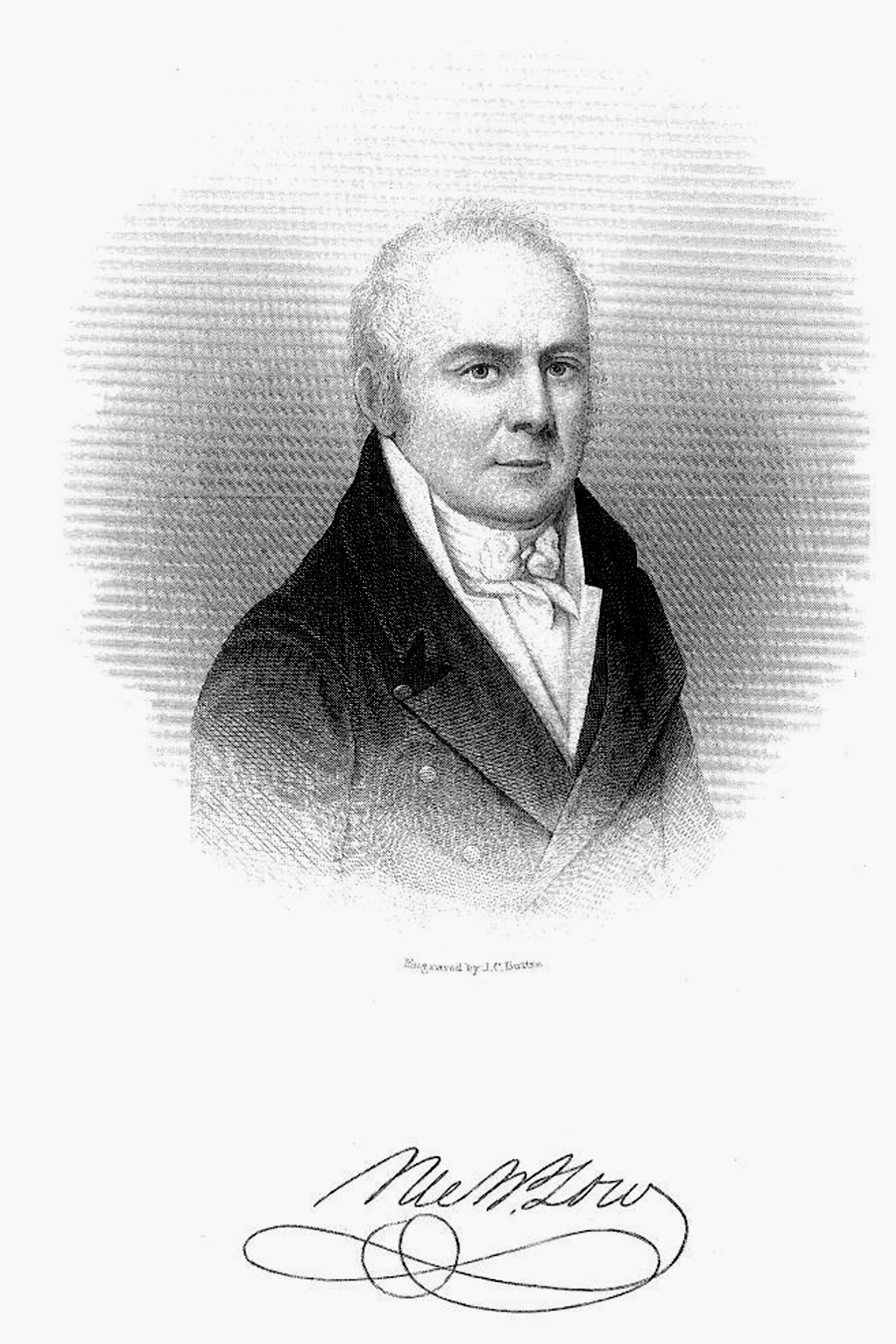

Member of the New York State Assembly
- In office July 1, 1787 – June 30, 1789

Personal details
- Born: 30 March 1739 Piscataway, Province of New Jersey, British America
- Died: 15 November 1826 (aged 87) New York City, New York, U.S.
- Party: Federalist
- Spouse: Alice Halliburton (died 1818)
- Parent(s): Cornelius Low Jr. Johanna Gouverneur
- Relatives: Issac Low (brother); Charles King (son-in-law); Mary Alsop King (granddaughter)
- Occupation: Merchant

Nicholas Low (March 30, 1739 – November 15, 1826) was an American merchant and developer from New York City. He developed properties in upstate New York, including Lowville (in Lewis County) which was named for him.

== Early life ==
Nicholas Low was born in the Raritan Landing section of Piscataway Township, Middlesex County, New Jersey and was the younger brother of Isaac Low. Low's family was descended from German, Dutch and French Huguenot settlers. Their father, Cornelius Low Jr., was a well-established merchant and shipper who had brought prominence to the community of Raritan Landing. The elder Low also had built the Cornelius Low House, a magnificent 1741 Georgian mansion.

== Career ==
Like his brother, Nicholas became a prominent merchant (Low & Wallace) in New York before the revolution. Unlike Isaac, he remained a supporter of the rebel cause during the American Revolution.

Low became active in civic and state affairs for a decade. A power vacuum was created in the city when the Loyalist population, including his brother Isaac, left with the British Army evacuated in 1783.

Nicholas served in the New York State Assembly from 1787 to 1789 as part of the 11th (Note: As a member of the 11th New York State Legislature, he represented New York County alongside Evert Bancker, Nicholas Bayard, David Brooks, Richard Harison, Daniel Nivin, Comfort Sands, Richard Varick, and Gulian Verplanck.) and 11th New York State Legislatures. (Note: As a member of the 12th New York State Legislature, he represented New York County alongside William W. Gilbert, Richard Harison, Nicholas Hoffman, Henry Brockholst Livingston, Alexander Macomb, Comfort Sands, Gulian Verplanck, and John Watts Jr.) He attended the state's 1788 convention that ratified the United States Constitution.

In the turmoil that followed the revolution, Low acquired several large tracts of land in upstate New York. At first these were purchased as speculations, but Low turned his attention to their development. He laid out townsites and divided his holdings to sell both land and lots. He is particularly tied with the early development of the city of Watertown and the town of Lowville.

=== Later life ===
In later years, Low turned his attention to developing his own properties. He built the Sans Souci hotel and factories in the Town of Ballston (Saratoga County). Low Street in Ballston Spa is named after him.

== Personal life ==
Late in life, Nicholas married Alice Halliburton (d. 1818). Together, the couple had three children:

- Ann Low (1779–1823), who married John Johnstone, descendant of New York mayor John Johnstone.
- Cornelius Low (1786–1849), who served as a Federalist in the 26th New York State Legislature.
- Nicholas Low Jr. (1797–1859)
- Henrietta Liston Low (1799–1882), who married Charles King (1789–1867), son of U.S. Senator Rufus King.

Low died in 1826 at his home in New York City.

=== Descendants ===
Through his daughter Henrietta, he was the grandfather of Anne Johnstone King (1827–1891); Cornelius Low King (1829–1893), who married Julia Ellen Lawrence (1832–1862), and later, Janet De Kay (1839–1896); Henrietta Low King (b. 1833); Gertrude Wallace King (b. 1836); Mary Alsop King (1839–1894), who became a writer and who married William Henry Waddington (1826–1894); and Augustus Fleming King (1841–1862), who died during the Civil War.
