= John A. King (1817–1900) =

American politician from New York

John Alsop King
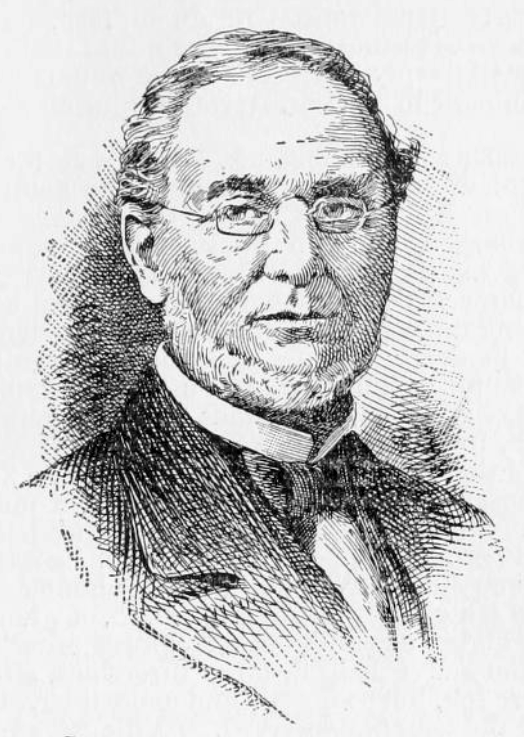

Member of the New York State Senate from the 1st district
- In office January 1, 1874 – December 31, 1875
- Preceded by: Townsend D. Cock
- Succeeded by: L. Bradford Prince

Personal details
- Born: July 14, 1817 Queens, New York, U.S.
- Died: November 21, 1900 (aged 83) Manhattan, New York, U.S.
- Party: Republican
- Spouse: Mary Colden Rhinelander (after 1839)
- Children: 5
- Parent(s): John Alsop King; Mary Ray King
- Relatives: Rufus King (grandfather); Charles Ray King (brother)
- Education: Harvard College
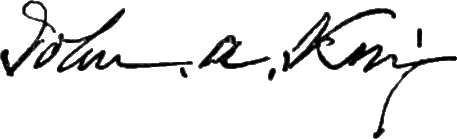
- Signature

John Alsop King Jr. (July 14, 1817 – November 21, 1900) was an American politician from New York.

== Early life ==
King was born on July 14, 1817, in Jamaica, Queens County, New York. He was the second son of children born to New York Governor John Alsop King (1788–1867) and Mary (née Ray) King (1790–1873). His brother was Charles Ray King and his sister, Elizabeth Ray King, was married to U.S. Congressman Henry Bell Van Rensselaer.

His grandfather was U.S. Senator and U.S. Ambassador to the United Kingdom, Rufus King, and great-grandfather was John Alsop (1724–1794), a prominent merchant. His uncles included Charles King, who was President of Columbia University, James Gore King, a U.S. Congressman, Edward King, the Speaker of the Ohio House of Representatives .

King attended Union Hall Academy in Jamaica; and graduated from Harvard College in 1835.

== Career ==
Then he engaged briefly in mercantile pursuits, studied law, was admitted to the bar, and practiced for some time. However, he spent most of his life as a gentleman farmer, looking after the family estate.

He was a delegate to the 1872 Republican National Convention; a presidential elector in 1872, voting for Ulysses S. Grant and Henry Wilson; and a member of the New York State Senate (1st D.) in 1874 and 1875. In 1876 and 1880, he ran unsuccessfully for the United States Congress.

He was President of the New-York Historical Society for eighteen years from 1887 until his death. The Society commissioned a portrait of King in 1892 by Robert Hinckley.

== Personal life ==
On February 21, 1839, he married Mary Colden Rhinelander (1818–1894), the only daughter of Philip Rhinelander and Mary Colden (née Hoffman) Rhinelander. Mary was a granddaughter of New York Attorney General Josiah Ogden Hoffman (1766–1837), and they had five daughters, several who died young including Cornelia Ray, Ellen and Frederica, including:

- Mary Rhinelander King (1842–1909), a philanthropist who did not marry.
- Alice King (1860–1920), who married Gherardi Davis (1858–1941), son of George Henry Davis, on April 7, 1894.

He died of pneumonia at the Savoy Hotel in Manhattan which had been his winter residence for a number of years, and was buried at the Grace Episcopal Churchyard in Jamaica, Queens.

== Sources ==
New York State Senate
Preceded by Townsend D. Cock	New York State Senate; 1st District; 1874–1875	Succeeded by L. Bradford Prince
