= John A. King =

22nd Governor of New York (1788–1867)

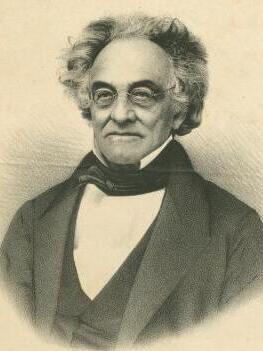

20th Governor of New York
- In office January 1, 1857 – December 31, 1858
- Lieutenant: Henry R. Selden
- Preceded by: Myron H. Clark
- Succeeded by: Edwin D. Morgan

Member of the U.S. House of Representatives from New York's 1st district
- In office March 4, 1849 – March 3, 1851
- Preceded by: Frederick W. Lord
- Succeeded by: John G. Floyd

Member of the New York State Senate from the 1st district
- In office January 1, 1823 – December 31, 1823
- Preceded by: New district
- Succeeded by: David Gardiner

Member of the New York State Assembly from the Queens County district
- In office January 1, 1840 – December 31, 1840
- Preceded by: Elias Hicks
- Succeeded by: John W. Lawrence
- In office January 1, 1838 – December 31, 1838
- In office January 1, 1832 – December 31, 1832
- In office January 1, 1819 – December 31, 1821

Personal details
- Born: John Alsop King; January 3, 1788 Queens County, New York, U.S.
- Died: July 7, 1867 (aged 79) Queens County, New York, U.S.
- Resting place: Grace Episcopal Churchyard
- Party: Republican; Whig
- Spouse: Mary Ray
- Children: 8, including Charles and John
- Parent(s): Rufus King; Mary Alsop
- Relatives: James G. King (brother); Charles King (brother); Edward King (brother); John Alsop (grandfather); Henry Bell Van Rensselaer (son-in-law)

John Alsop King (January 3, 1788 – July 7, 1867) was an American politician who was the twentieth governor of New York from 1857 to 1858. He was the 1st Republican governor of New York.

== Life ==
King was born in the area now encompassed by New York City on January 3, 1788, to U.S. senator Rufus King (1755–1827) and Mary (née Alsop) King. His maternal grandparents were John Alsop (1724–1794), a prominent merchant and Mary Frogat (1744–1772). John A. King was part of the King family of Massachusetts and New York through his mother.

He had four younger brothers, including Charles King (1789–1867), who was President of Columbia University, and Congressman James G. King (1791–1853), Edward King (1795–1836) and Frederic Gore King (1802–1829).

When his father was appointed the U.S. ambassador to Great Britain, the family moved to Britain, and King was educated at Harrow School. Upon graduating from Harrow, King returned to New York City to study law. He was admitted to the bar and practiced in New York City.

== Career ==
John King's law career was interrupted by a stint in the military; he served as a cavalry lieutenant in the War of 1812. After the war, however, he returned to his law practice and then ventured into politics. King was a member of the New York State Assembly (Queens Co.) in 1819, 1820 and 1820–21; of the New York State Senate (First D.) in 1823; and again of the State Assembly in 1832, 1838 and 1840.

He was president of the New York State Agricultural Society in 1849.

=== United States Congress ===
King was elected as a Whig to the 31st United States Congress, holding office from March 4, 1849, to March 3, 1851.

=== Governor of New York ===
His term as Governor of New York from 1857 to 1858 was noted for improvements to the State's education system and the enlargement of the Erie Canal. Following a series of attacks (the so-called Quarantine War of 1858) on the quarantine facility on Staten Island, King dispatched several units of the New York State Militia to briefly occupy the island. In 1859, King was elected as an honorary member of the New York Society of the Cincinnati.

=== Presidential Elector ===
In the 1860 presidential election, when the Republicans won New York, King was elected a presidential elector and voted for Abraham Lincoln and Hannibal Hamlin.

== Personal life ==
He was married to Mary Ray (1790–1873), daughter of Cornelius and Elizabeth Elmendorf Ray. Together, John and Mary had:

- Mary King (1810–1894), who married Phineas Miller Nightingale (1803–1873)
- Charles Ray King (1813–1901), who married Hannah Wharton Fisher (1816–1870) in 1839. After her death, he married her sister, Nancy Wharton Fisher (1826–1905) in 1872.
- Elizabeth Ray King (1815–1900), who married Henry Bell Van Rensselaer (1810–1864), a United States Congressman and member of the Van Rensselaer family.
- John Alsop King Jr. (1817–1900), a state senator who married Mary Colden Rhinelander (1818–1894), granddaughter of Josiah Ogden Hoffman (1766–1837)
- Caroline King (1820–1900), who married her first cousin, James Gore King Jr. (1819–1867), son of James G. King
- Richard King (1822–1891), who married Elizabeth Lewis (1822–1891), daughter of Mordecai Lewis in 1839
- Cornelia King (1824–1897)
- Ellen King (1825–1827)

King died on July 7, 1867, in Queens County, New York, and was buried at the Grace Church Cemetery in Jamaica, Queens.

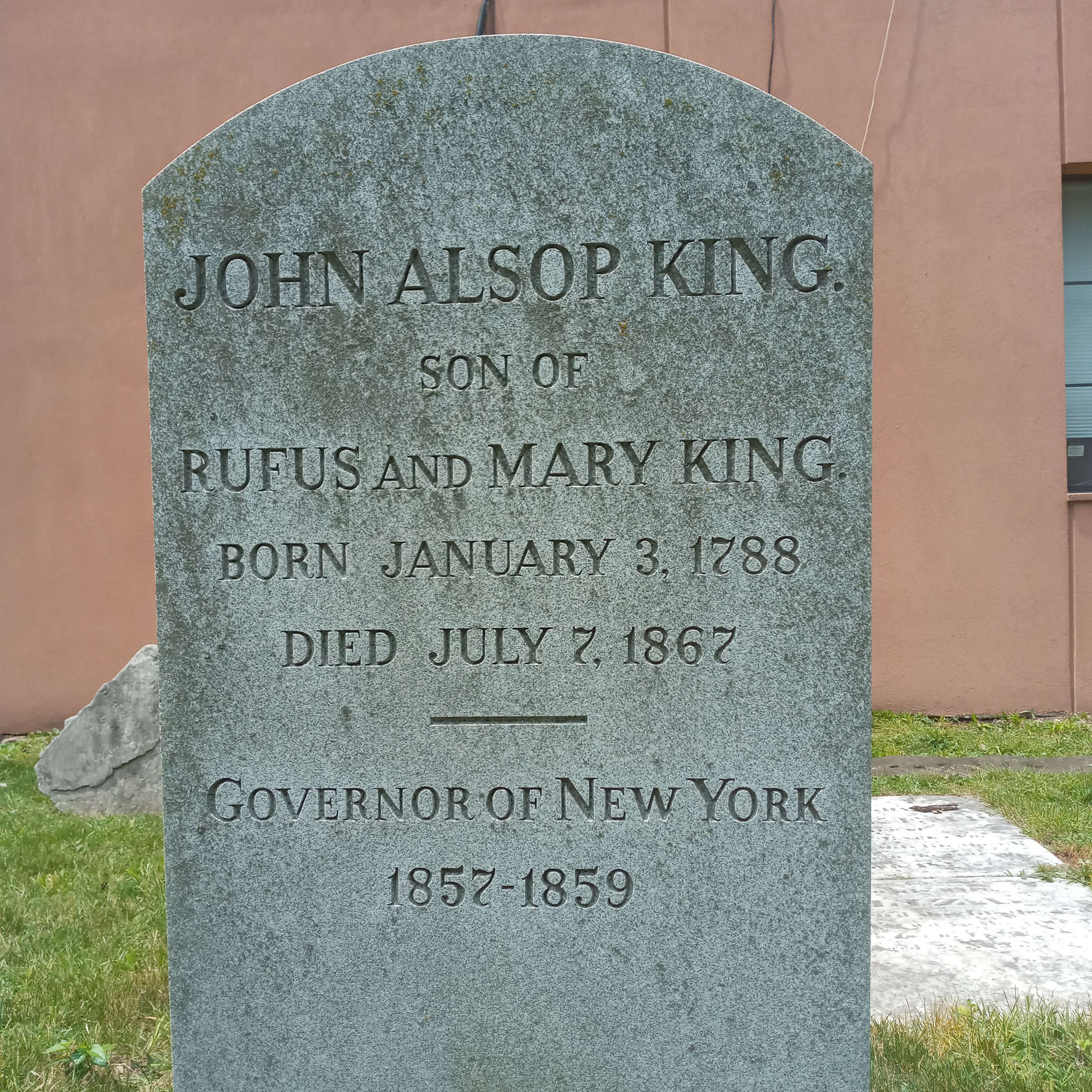
The gravesite of Governor John Alsop King

Party political offices
| First | Republican nominee for Governor of New York; 1856 | Succeeded by Edwin D. Morgan |
New York State Senate
| Preceded by New district | New York State Senate; First district (Class 1); 1823 | Succeeded by David Gardiner |
U.S. House of Representatives
| Preceded by Frederick W. Lord | Member of the U.S. House of Representatives from New York's 1st congressional district 1849–1851 | Succeeded by John G. Floyd |
Political offices
| Preceded by Myron H. Clark | Governor of New York; 1857–1858 | Succeeded by Edwin D. Morgan |
