= Rufus King Jr. =

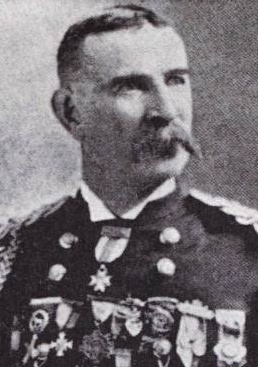
- King after the American Civil War
- Born: March 21, 1838; New York City, New York
- Died: March 18, 1900 (aged 61); New York City
- Military career
- Allegiance: United States of America; Union
- Branch: United States Army; Union Army
- Service years: 1861 - 1871
- Rank: Brevet Major
- Units: (New York (state)) 7th New York Militia (United States) 4th U.S. Light Artillery, Battery A (United States) 4th U.S. Infantry Regiment
- Conflicts: American Civil War
- Awards: Medal of Honor

Rufus King Jr. (March 21, 1838 – March 18, 1900) was an artillery officer in the Union Army during the American Civil War, and a Medal of Honor recipient.

== Family ==
Born in New York City, Rufus King Jr. was the son of Rufus King, a graduate of the United States Military Academy, Class of 1833, and brigadier general during the Civil War, and the brother of Charles King, who was a military commander in the Philippine–American War. His great-grandfather was Rufus King, who was one of the signers of the United States Constitution.

== Military career ==
The younger King entered the army as a private in Company F, 7th New York Militia, serving a three-month enlistment from April to June 1861. He acquired a direct commission as a first lieutenant in the regular U.S. Army, and was assigned to the 4th U.S. Artillery, on August 5, 1861. He served in the Army of the Potomac throughout the war, eventually commanding (from 1864) 4th U.S. Light Artillery, Battery A, in the famed U.S. Horse Artillery Brigade. Lieutenant King was awarded one brevet promotion (to captain) for his bravery during the Seven Days Battles, in actions at the Battle of White Oak Swamp, on June 30, 1862. During that fight, King ranked only as a section chief, took command of combined Batteries A & C, 4th U.S. Artillery, when his commander was wounded.

At the end of the war, King was brevetted major for conduct during the war, but would have to wait until 1869 to receive his permanent promotion to captain. He was honorably mustered out of the Army on January 1, 1871.

Rufus King has been incorrectly credited with designing a disappearing gun carriage known as King's Depression Carriage in the late 1860s. This carriage was, in fact, designed by William Rice King, of the Army Corps of Engineers. This used a counterweight to allow a 15-inch (381 mm) Rodman gun to be moved up and down a swiveling ramp, so the weapon could be reloaded, elevated, and traversed behind cover. It was not adopted. Part of a test installation at Fort Foote, Maryland remains.

King was a Veteran companion of the Military Order of the Loyal Legion of the United States and an hereditary companion of the Military Order of Foreign Wars.

Major King died in New York on March 18, 1900. He was buried at the Evergreen Cemetery and Crematory, Hillside, Union County, New Jersey, Plot: 42-Lawn Plot, Map 5.

== The Medal of Honor ==
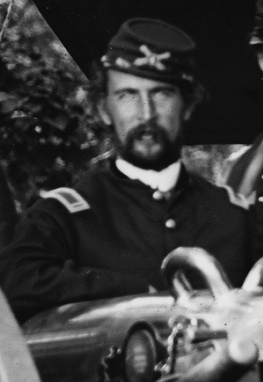
King during the American Civil War

On March 22, 1898, the United States Army finally awarded King the Medal of Honor for his actions at White Oak Swamp.

Rank and organization: First Lieutenant, 4th U.S. Artillery. Place and date: At White Oak Swamp Bridge, Va., June 30, 1862. Entered service at: New York. Birth: New York. Date of issue: April 2, 1898.

Citation:

This officer, when his captain was wounded, succeeded to the command of two batteries while engaged against a superior force of the enemy and fought his guns most gallantly until compelled to retire.

== See also ==
- List of Medal of Honor recipients
- List of American Civil War Medal of Honor recipients: G–L
