= King political family =

Family of politicians from the United States

The King family is a family of politicians from the United States. Below is a list of members:

- Stephanus Van Cortlandt (1643–1700), Mayor of New York City 1677-1678 1686–1688. Great-great-great-grandfather of Henry Van Rensselaer.
- Jacobus Van Cortlandt (1658–1739), Mayor of New York City 1710–1711. Brother of Stephanus Van Cortlandt.
- Pieter Schuyler (1657–1724), acting Governor of New York Colony 1709 1719–1720. Brother-in-law of Stephanus Van Cortlandt and Jacobus Van Cortlandt.
  - John Alsop (1724–1794), New York Colony Assemblyman, Delegate to the Continental Congress from New York 1774–1776. Father-in-law of Rufus King.
    - Philip Livingston (1716–1778), New York City Alderman 1754–1762, New York Colony Representative 1763–1769, member of the New York Committee of Correspondence, Delegate to the Continental Congress from New York 1775–1778, President of the New York Colony Convention 1775, New York Assemblyman 1776, New York State Senator 1777. Father-in-law of Stephen Van Rensselaer III.
    - William Livingston (1723–1790), Delegate to the Continental Congress from New Jersey 1774–1776, Governor of New Jersey 1776–1790. Brother of Philip Livingston.
    - Rufus King (1755–1827), member of the Massachusetts General Court 1783–1785, Delegate to the Continental Congress from Massachusetts 1784–1787, delegate to the Philadelphia Convention, New York Assemblyman, U.S. Senator from New York 1789-1796 1813–1825, candidate for Vice President of the United States 1804 1808 candidate for President of the United States 1816, U.S. Minister to Great Britain 1825–1826. Son-in-law of John Alsop.
    - William King (1768–1862), Massachusetts State Representative 1795 1799 1804, Massachusetts State Senator, Governor of Maine 1820–1821, candidate for Governor of Maine 1834. Brother of Rufus King and Cyrus King.
    - Cyrus King (1772–1817), U.S. Representative from Massachusetts 1813–1817. Brother of Rufus King and William King.
      - Stephen Van Rensselaer III (1764–1839), New York Assemblyman 1789–1791, New York State Senator 1791–1796, Lieutenant Governor of New York 1795–1801, U.S. Representative from New York 1822–1829. Son-in-law of Philip Livingston.
      - John Alsop King (1788–1867), New York 1819-1821 1832 1838 1840, New York State Senator 1823–1825, U.S. Chargé d'Affaires to England 1826, delegate to the Whig Party National Convention 1839 1852, U.S. Representative from New York 1849–1851, delegate to the Republican National Convention 1856, Governor of New York 1857-1857. Son of Rufus King.
      - James G. King (1791–1853), U.S. Representative from New Jersey 1849–1851. Son of Rufus King.
        - Rufus King (1814–1876), delegate to the Wisconsin Constitutional Convention 1848, U.S. Minister to the Papal States 1863. Grandson of Rufus King.
        - Henry Van Rensselaer (1810–1864), U.S. Representative from New York 1841–1843. Son of Stephen Van Rensselaer and son-in-law of John Alsop King.

NOTE: Philip Livingston and William Livingston were also cousins of U.S. Secretary of State Edward Livingston and U.S. Secretary of Foreign Affairs Robert R. Livingston.

== See also ==
- List of United States political families
