= Jean-Charles-Alexandre Sallandrouze de Lamornaix =

French admiral

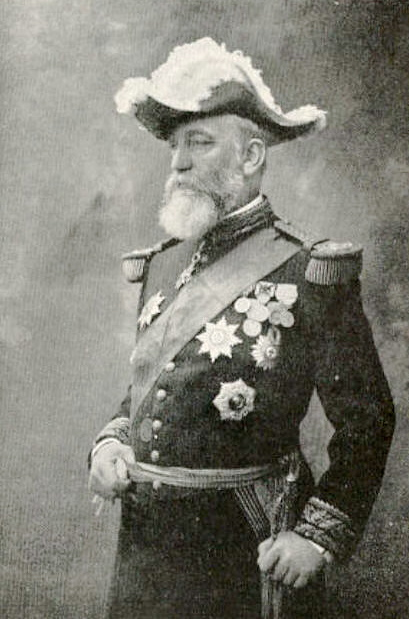
- Born: 16 April 1840; Paris, Kingdom of France
- Died: 18 September 1899 (aged 59) Cherbourg, France
- Allegiance: Kingdom of France; French Third Republic
- Branch: French Navy
- Service years: 1855 – July 1898
- Rank: Naval Officer; Commander; Vice-amiral

Jean-Charles-Alexandre Sallandrouze de Lamornaix (16 April 1840 in Paris – 18 September 1899 in Cherbourg) was a French admiral who served as the Chief of Staff of the French Navy from 1896 to 1898. He died on the Formidable in Cherbourg Harbour. He was decorated with the French Legion of Honor, Grand Cross of the Order of Saint Anna, the Order of Saint Stanislaus, the Order of Aviz, the Order of Christ of Portugal, the Order of the Holy Sepulchre, the Order of the Medjidie, the Order of the Sacred Treasure and the Order of the Crown of Siam.

== Life ==
Jean-Charles-Alexandre Sallandrouze de Lamornaix was the second son of the politician Charles Sallandrouze de Lamornaix, who represented Creuse in the National Assembly between 1846 and 1847.

Sallandrouze de Lamornaix began his career in 1855, as a naval officer at the École navale aboard the training ship Borda (formerly the Commerce de Paris). After a brief station in Brest from August to October 1857, he was assigned to the Algésiras, a ship belonging to the French navy's training squadron (Escadre d'évolution). He was stationed on board the Artémise during a voyage to Iceland in 1860, and then aboard the Biche in the Levant, becoming a sub-lieutenant (Enseigne de vaisseau) while serving on the latter ship in September 1861. Stations on the battleship Masséna and the ships Montezuma and Normandie in the Gulf of Mexico followed, and he became a Chevalier of the Legion of Honour (Légion d'Honneur) in July 1862. He was promoted to lieutenant (Lieutenant de Vaisseau) in January 1864, and stationed for a time in the United Kingdom. Upon his return he translated and published into French the Commercial Code devised by the British Board of Trade; the Code later evolved into the International Code of Signals.

Sallandrouze de Lamornaix gained his first independent command in August 1870, as commander of the gunboat Scorpion in the Far East naval division (division navale de l'Extrême-Orient). He was promoted to commander (Capitaine de Frégate) in 1875, and stationed on the ironclad Gauloise from 1877 until 1879, when he became aide-de-camp to Rear-Admiral Laurent Joseph Lejuene, the commander of the Escadre d'évolution, where he served on the latter's flagship, the ironclad Provence. He commanded the Hirondelle in the same squadron from 1882 until 1885, during which time he was advanced to Officer of the Legion of Honour, in 1882, and promoted to captain (Capitaine de Vaisseau) in March 1884.

In 1885, Sallandrouze de Lamornaix returned to the École navale as commander (although the Commerce de Paris had been scrapped and replaced by the Intrépide), before taking command of the ironclad Courbet in the Mediterranean from 1889. He became a rear-admiral (Contre-amiral) in 1890, and a Knight of the Order of the Holy Sepulchre in the same year. From 1891 to 1893, he served as a member of the Board of Construction (Conseil des travaux), and was raised to Commander of the Legion of Honour in 1892. He became commander-in-chief of the naval training division (Division navale volante et d'instruction) in 1893.

Sallandrouze de Lamornaix was present at the coronation of Tsar Nicholas II in May 1896. Promoted to vice-admiral (Vice-amiral), he replaced Admiral Charles Chauvin as Chief of Staff of the French Navy (Chef d’état-major de la Marine) in June 1896, and served until July 1898, during which time he also acted as private secretary (Directeur de Cabinet) to naval minister Armand Besnard. He took command of the Northern Squadron (escadre du Nord) in 1899, and died while aboard flagship his Formidable in September 1899. He is buried in the Père Lachaise cemetery in Paris.

== Personal life ==
He married Marie Adélaïde Hébert de La Grave in 1875. The couple had four children:

- Jean (born 1878)
- Renée (born 1880)
- Charlotte (born 1882)
- Marie-Magdeleine (born 1885)

Charlotte married Francis Richard Waddington, the son of prime minister William Waddington and his wife Mary Alsop King.

== Honours ==
- France
  - National Order of the Legion of Honour, July 1862
- Russian Empire
  - Order of Saint Anna
  - Order of Saint Stanislaus (House of Romanov)
- Kingdom of Portugal
  - Military Order of Aviz
    - Military Order of Christ
- Empire of Japan
  - Order of the Sacred Treasure
- Ottoman Empire
  - Order of the Medjidie
- Siam
  - Order of the Crown of Thailand
- Vatican
  - Order of the Holy Sepulchre, 1890
