= Kauyaichits =

Native American ethnic group

Kauyaichits are a Chemehuevi subdivision, a mixed Shoshone and Paiute people in the area of Ash Meadows, Nye co, Nevada, United States. They were also known as Ash Meadows Paiute, but were called Siwindu (Easterners) by the Shoshone and nu (people), the name they applied to themselves.

Ash Meadows is within the Amargosa Desert, and Charles King gave it the name (1872) due to the number of trees around the springs. Pine nuts and mesquite beans were the staple foods of the Indians.

== See also ==
- Ash Meadows National Wildlife Refuge
