= Charles Ray King =

American physician, farmer and author

- Born: March 16, 1813; Jamaica, New York (state)
- Died: April 5, 1901 (aged 88); Pennsylvania
- Occupations: Physician; Author
- Notable work: The Life and Correspondence of Rufus King; King Library
- Spouses: Hannah Wharton Fisher (1816–1870); Nancy Wharton Fisher (1826–1905)
- Parent(s): John Alsop King; Mary Ray King
- Relatives: Rufus King (grandfather); John A. King (brother)

Charles Ray King (March 16, 1813 – April 5, 1901) was an American physician, farmer and author. He was the second child of John A. King, Governor of New York from 1857 to 1858, and grandson of Constitution signer Rufus King. He authored the book The Life and Correspondence of Rufus King and founded King Library in Andalusia, Pennsylvania. Some sources incorrectly state Charles Ray King's name as Charles Rufus King.

== Life ==
Charles Ray King was born on March 16, 1813, in Jamaica, New York (state) to John Alsop King and Mary Ray King. He was the second of eight children. His brother, also named John A. King, was a delegate to the 1872 Republican National Convention and later a member of the New York State Senate. Charles Ray King attended grammar school in Jamaica and graduated from Columbia University in 1831, King received medical degree from the University of Pennsylvania in 1834. After spending two years studying in Paris, he returned to New York and worked as a physician. He married Hannah Wharton Fisher (1816–1870) on December 12, 1839.

King moved to Philadelphia and retired from medicine in 1848. He purchased the Chelwood estate from Edward Biddle, son of Nicholas Biddle and later moved to Devon, an adjacent estate. Devon was subject to a fire five years after King moved in. King rebuilt the house and moved his personal library, the King library, to his estate. Hannah Wharton Fisher died in 1870, two years later in 1872, he married her sister Nancy Wharton Fisher (1826–1905).

His desired to build a more ambitious library led to the founding of King Library on 1065 Bristol Pike in Andalusia in 1882. The library's architecture was based on John Quincy Adams Library, now known as Stone Library, located in Quincy, Massachusetts. The King Library building was completed and opened to the public in 1888. King donated a large portion of his own books to the library.

== Death ==
King died on April 5, 1901, at the age of 88.
