= William Waddington =

19th century French statesman, Prime Minister (1879) and an Ambassador of France

His Excellency William Waddington
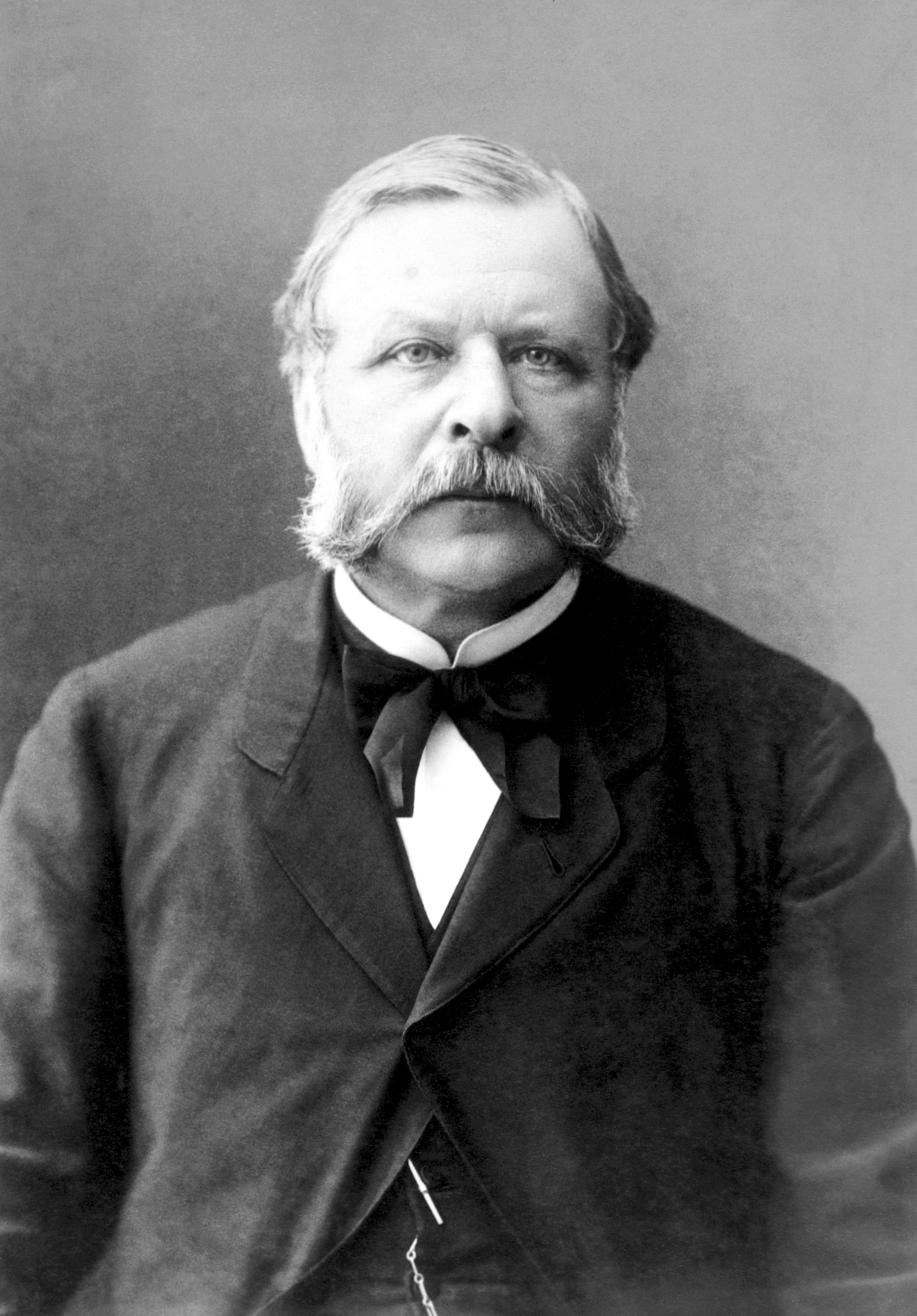

France's Ambassador to the United Kingdom
- In office 1883–1893
- Preceded by: Paul-Armand Challemel-Lacour
- Succeeded by: Alphonse Chodron, baron de Courcel

Prime Minister of France
- In office 4 February 1879 – 28 December 1879
- President: Jules Grévy
- Preceded by: Jules Dufaure
- Succeeded by: Charles de Freycinet

Personal details
- Born: 11 December 1826 Saint-Rémy-sur-Avre
- Died: 13 January 1894 (aged 67) Paris
- Party: None
- Spouses: Mathilde Lutteroth (m. 1850; died 1852) Mary Alsop King (m. 1874)
- Children: Henri Waddington; Francis Richard Waddington
- Parent(s): Thomas Waddington; Anne Chisholm
- Relatives: Richard Waddington (brother); Charles Waddington (cousin); Walter Shirley (uncle)
- Education: Rugby School
- Alma mater: Trinity College, Cambridge
- Awards: Grand-Croix, Légion d'honneur

William Henry Waddington (11 December 1826 – 13 January 1894) was a French statesman who served as Prime Minister in 1879, and as an Ambassador of France to London.

== Early life and education ==
Waddington was born at the Château of Saint-Rémy in Eure-et-Loir, the son of a rich British industrialist, Thomas Waddington, whose family had established a large cotton manufacturing business in France, Établissements Waddington fils et Cie.

His father and mother Anne (née Chisholm - Scottish) were both naturalised French citizens, and Waddington received his early education at the Lycée Louis-le-Grand in Paris. He was then sent to Repton School and then Rugby School in Britain, supervised by his uncle Walter Shirley. After Rugby, he was admitted to Trinity College, Cambridge; he took an MA degree, having won Second Prize in Classics as well as the prestigious Chancellor's Gold Medal.

Waddington rowed in the victorious Cambridge eight in the Oxford and Cambridge Boat Race on the Thames in race of March 1849; he did not take part in the repeat race in December that year, which Oxford won.

== Career ==
=== Archaeological research ===
Returning to France, Waddington devoted himself for some years to archaeological research. He travelled throughout Asia Minor, Greece and Syria, and his experiences and discoveries are detailed in two Mémoires, the first produced by the French Institute and subsequently in his Mélanges de numismatique et de philologie ("Numismatic and Philological Miscellanies", 1861).

Except for his essay on "The Protestant Church in France", published in 1856 in Cambridge Essays, his remaining works all concerned archaeology. They include his Fastes des Provinces Asiatiques de l'Empire Romain ("The Governor-Lists of the Asiatic Provinces of the Roman Empire", 1872), and editions of Diocletian's Edict on Maximum Prices and of Philippe Le Bas' Voyage archéologique (1868–1877).

A Fellow of the Society of Antiquaries of London, in 1865, Waddington was also elected a member of the Académie des Inscriptions et Belles-Lettres.

=== Chamber of Deputies ===
After contesting the seat of the Aisne for the Chamber of Deputies unsuccessfully in 1865 and 1860, Waddington was elected as Deputy in January 1871. In 1873, he was appointed Minister of Public Instruction in Prime Minister Dufaure's short-lived second government of 18–24 May 1873.

=== Senator for the Aisne ===
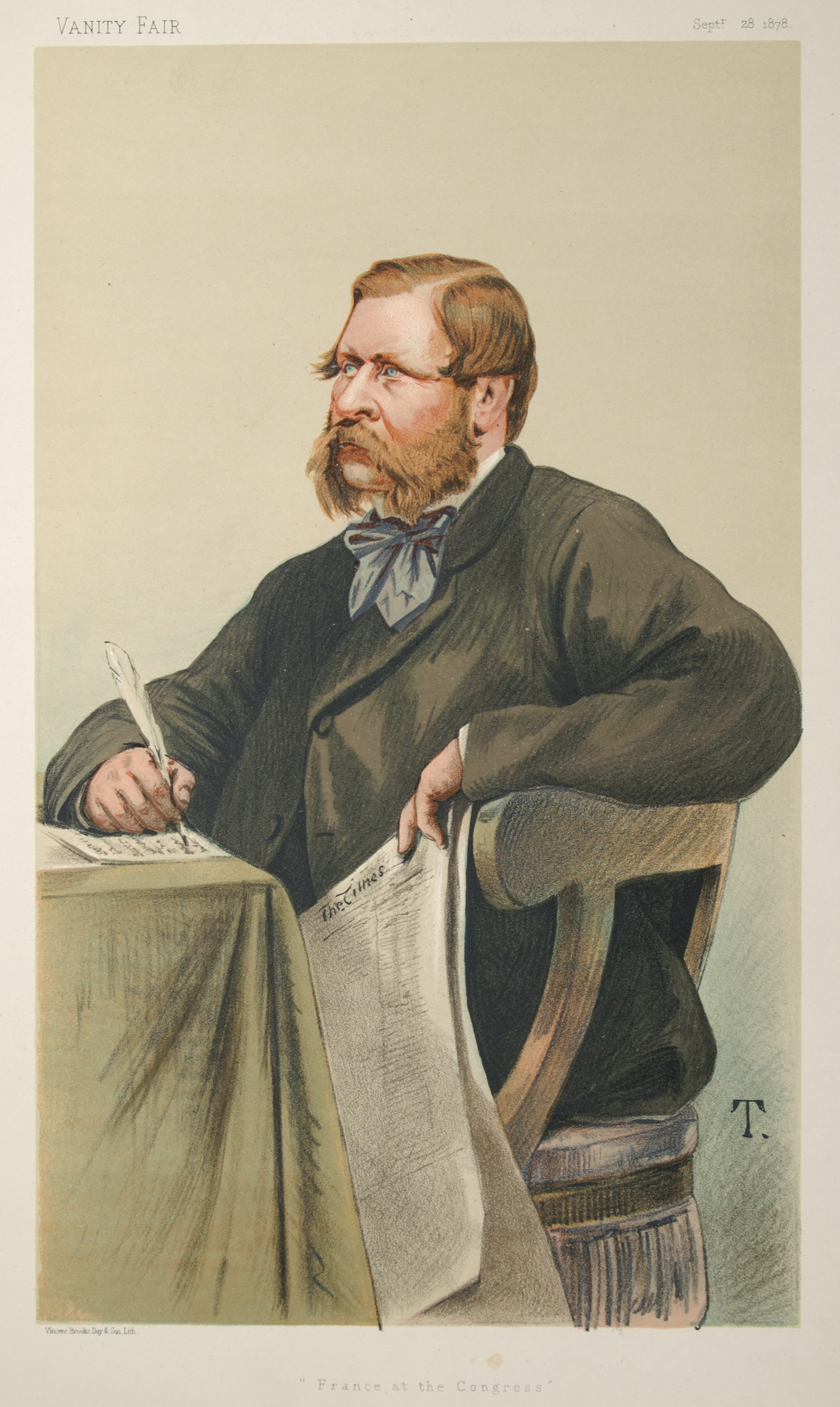
"France at the Congress", caricature by T in Vanity Fair, 1878.

On 30 January 1876, he was elected Senator for Aisne and was again nominated by Prime Minister Dufaure to the ministerial brief of Public Instruction. He was charged with devising a Bill transferring extra powers to the State, a tricky task which he negotiated through the Chamber, but was defeated in the Senate. He continued to hold office under Jules Simon's premiership until being thrown out during the Seize mai constitutional crisis (16 May 1877).

The triumph of the Republicans in the following October 1877 General Election returned Waddington to government as Minister of Foreign Affairs, again under Prime Minister Dufaure. He was one of the French plenipotentiaries at the Berlin Congress (1878). The cession of Cyprus to the United Kingdom was, at first, perceived by the French newspapers as a great blow to his diplomatic reputation, until it became clear that his discussions with Lord Salisbury had resulted in Britain's agreement to allow France a free hand in Tunisia. In 1885, he was re-elected for the senate.

=== Prime Minister of France ===
Early in 1879 Waddington agreed to take over from Jules Dufaure as a caretaker Prime Minister with the agreement of Léon Gambetta. He kept peace between the radicals and the reactionaries till the delay of urgent reforms lost him the support of all parties. He stepped down on 27 December.

He refused the immediate offer of ambassadorship to London, preferring to take up the role in 1880 of rapporteur to the parliamentary committee for the Scrutin de liste (of elections); he delivered an adverse judgment.

==== Waddington's Government, 5 February – 28 December 1879 ====
- William Henry Waddington – President of the Council and Minister of Foreign Affairs
- Henri François Xavier Gresley – Minister of Defence
- Émile de Marcère – Minister of the Interior and Worship
- Léon Say – Minister of Finance
- Philippe Le Royer – Minister of Justice
- Jean Bernard Jauréguiberry – Minister of Marine and Colonies
- Jules Ferry – Minister of Public Instruction
- Charles de Freycinet – Minister of Public Works
- Adolphe Cochery – Minister of Posts and Telegraphs
- Charles Lepère – Minister of Agriculture and Commerce

Ministerial changes

- 4 March 1879 – Charles Lepère succeeded Marcère as Minister of the Interior and Worship; and Pierre Tirard succeeded Lepère as Minister of Agriculture and Commerce.

=== French Ambassador to London ===
In 1883 Waddington accepted the appointment and dignity of Ambassadeur de France to London. He held this post for ten years until 1893, during which time his wife, Mary Alsop King, wrote some recollections of their diplomatic experiences – Letters of a Diplomat's Wife, 1883–1900 (New York, 1903), and Italian Letters of a Diplomat's Wife (1904), which were published after her husband's death.

== Personal life ==
Waddington's first wife, whom he married in 1850, was Mathilde (died 1852), daughter of the banker, Henri Lutteroth; they had a son Henri (1852–1939), a captain in the Chasseurs Alpins (French Army), who married Émilie de La Robertie.

In Paris in 1874, Waddington married his second wife, Mary Alsop King (died 1923), an American-born author from New York City, daughter of US Representative Charles King (also ninth President of Columbia University), by his second wife, travel writer Henrietta Liston Low. They had one son, Francis Richard, who married (18 January 1903, Paris) Charlotte, daughter of Vice-Admiral Jean-Charles-Alexandre Sallandrouze de Lamornaix. Charlotte was the granddaughter of Charles Sallandrouze de Lamornaix.

=== Honours ===
- Grand-Croix, Légion d'honneur
- Hon. LLD (Cantab)

== See also ==
- Professor Charles Waddington, cousin of William Henry Waddington
- Senator Richard Waddington, brother of William Henry Waddington
- Alfred Waddington, uncle of William Henry Waddington
- Saint-Rémy-sur-Avre
- List of Cambridge University Boat Race crews
- List of Ambassadors of France to the United Kingdom

== Sources ==
Political offices
Preceded by Jules Simon	Minister of Public Instruction; 1873	Succeeded by Anselme Batbie
Preceded by Henri Wallon	Minister of Public Instruction; 1876–1877	Succeeded by Joseph Brunet
Preceded by Marquis de Banneville	Minister of Foreign Affairs; 1877–1879	Succeeded by Charles de Freycinet
Preceded by Jules Dufaure	Prime Minister of France; 1879	Succeeded by Charles de Freycinet
