= Rufus King (general) =

American soldier and diplomat

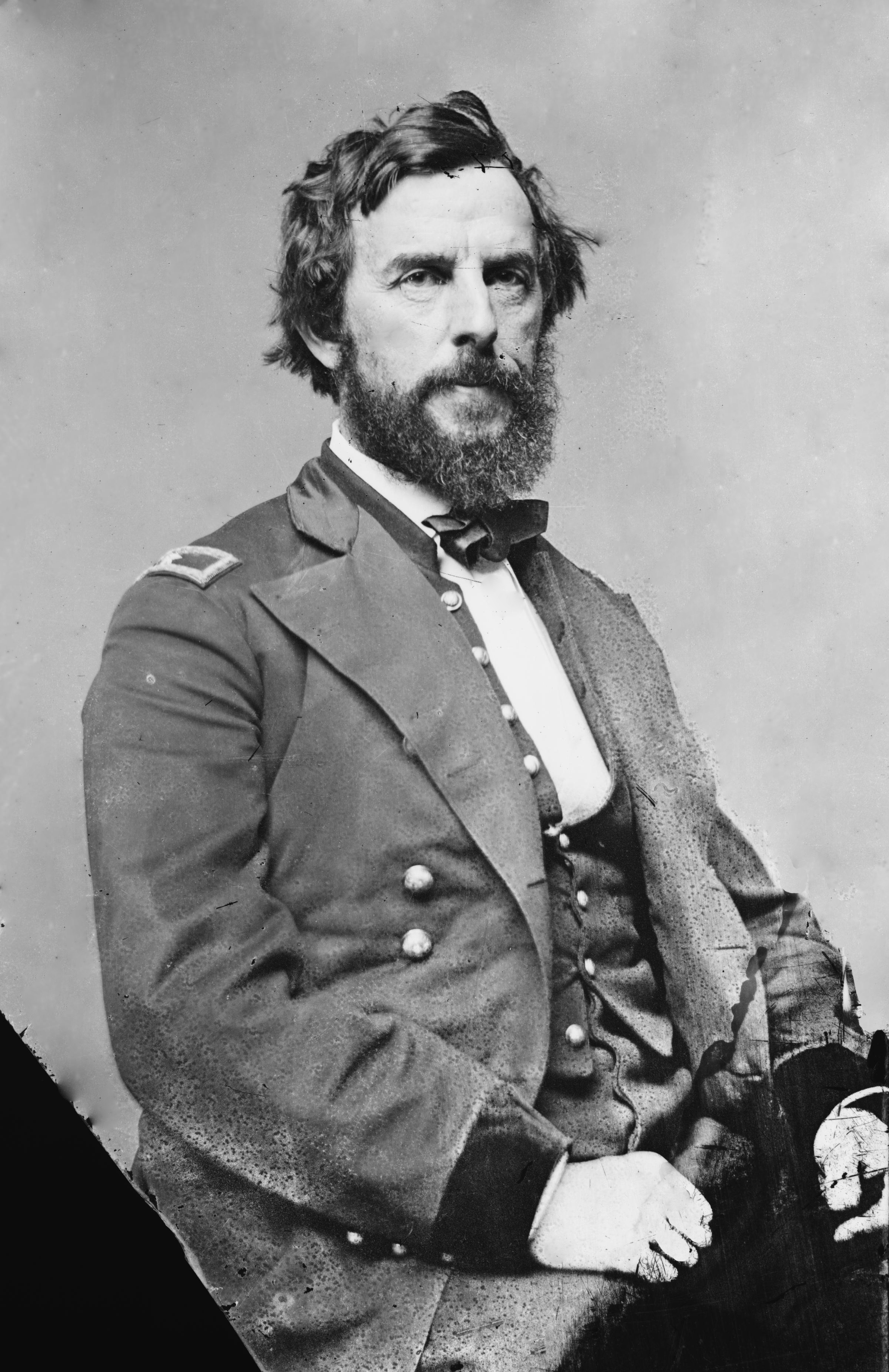
- A photograph of King taken between 1855-1865

5th United States Minister to the Papal States
- In office January 8, 1864 – August 17, 1867
- President: Abraham Lincoln; Andrew Johnson
- Preceded by: Richard M. Blatchford
- Succeeded by: Diplomatic relations severed

17th Adjutant General of New York
- In office January 1839 – January 1843
- Preceded by: Allan Macdonald
- Succeeded by: Lyman Sanford

Personal details
- Born: January 26, 1814 New York City, New York, U.S.
- Died: October 13, 1876 (aged 62) New York City, New York, U.S.
- Resting place: Grace Episcopal Churchyard, Jamaica, New York
- Spouses: Ellen Eliot (m. 1836; died 1838) Susan Eliot (m. 1843–1876)
- Children: Rufus, Jr. Charles
- Parents: Charles King (father); Eliza Gracie (mother)

Military service
- Allegiance: United States
- Branch/service: United States Army; New York Militia; United States Volunteers; Union Army
- Years of service: 1833–1836 (USA); 1839–1843 (NY); 1861–1863 (USV)
- Rank: Brigadier General, USV
- Commands: Iron Brigade
- Battles/wars: American Civil War; Northern Virginia campaign; Second Battle of Bull Run; Maryland campaign

Rufus King (January 26, 1814 – October 13, 1876) was an American newspaper editor, public servant, diplomat, and soldier. He served as a Union Army brigadier general in the American Civil War, and was responsible for assembling the famed Iron Brigade of the Army of the Potomac. He was later U.S. minister (ambassador) to the Papal States from 1864 to 1867 and was instrumental in the capture of accused Lincoln assassination plotter John Surratt. Earlier in life, he had been a member of the first board of regents of the University of Wisconsin.

== Early life ==
King was born in New York City, New York, to Charles King, president of Columbia College, and Eliza Gracie. He was the grandson of Rufus King, delegate for Massachusetts to the Continental Congress and the Constitutional Convention and U.S. Senator from New York. The Kings were part of the King family of Massachusetts, New York, and Maine. After graduation from Columbia Grammar & Preparatory School, King enrolled in the United States Military Academy at West Point in 1829 and graduated fourth in his class. He was commissioned into the United States Corps of Engineers in 1833 but resigned in 1836 to become the civil engineer for the New York and Erie Railroad.

After three years with the railroad, King decided to change his career path and became a newspaper editor. He worked at the Albany Daily Advertiser and the Albany Evening Journal, which were published by Thurlow Weed, a leading figure in the New York's Whig Party. In 1839, King was appointed Adjutant General of New York by Governor William H. Seward, a political ally of Weed. He held this post until 1843, and was succeeded by Lyman Sanford.

== Family ==
In 1836, King married Ellen Eliot, who died two years into marriage; they had no children. After five years, King married her sister Susan Eliot, and they had two children. His son Rufus King Jr. became a Union Army officer of the U.S. Horse Artillery Brigade and was awarded the Medal of Honor; his other son, Charles King became a brigadier general of volunteers during the Spanish–American War and a writer of Western novels.

== Moving to Wisconsin ==
In 1845, he left New York and moved to the Wisconsin Territory, accomplishing a mixture of politics (member of the 1848 Wisconsin constitutional convention), journalism (editor and part owner of the Milwaukee Sentinel and Gazette), and education (superintendent of schools in Milwaukee in 1859–1860, and a regent of the University of Wisconsin in 1848–1854). King organized and played in the first three baseball games played in the state of Wisconsin. The matches were played at the old State Fairgrounds, now the Marquette University campus, during the winter of 1859.

== Civil War ==
King was appointed by President Abraham Lincoln as Minister to the Papal States in 1861 after being recommended by Secretary of State Seward. On his way to Rome when the Civil War broke out, he took a leave of absence to join the Union Army. He was appointed a brigadier general of the Wisconsin militia on April 15, 1861, and of U.S. Volunteers on May 17, and was given authorization to raise a Wisconsin regiment. King helped organize what came to be known as the famous Iron Brigade, the Second, Fifth, Sixth, and Seventh Wisconsin, and Nineteenth Indiana volunteers, which he commanded briefly.

Before the Iron Brigade saw combat, King was promoted on March 13, 1862, to command of a division, which included the Iron Brigade, in the I Corps of the Army of the Potomac replacing general Irvin McDowell. The Division's first action was in the Second Battle of Bull Run in August 1862. On August 28, 1862, King received orders to advance on Warrenton Turnpike towards Centreville, Virginia. Later in the day, his division was attacked by Confederate forces under Stonewall Jackson's command.

Suffering from epileptic seizures, King spent the battle in an ambulance wagon and turned over command of the division to Brig. Gen John P. Hatch, the ranking brigade commander. Hatch then led King's division at Second Bull Run and during the Maryland Campaign until being wounded at South Mountain. In December 1862, King served on the court-martial of Maj. Gen. Fitz John Porter for disobedience and cowardice at Second Bull Run.

King performed garrison duty at Fort Monroe, Virginia, and was a military governor of Norfolk. His epileptic seizures became more frequent, and in October 1863, King resigned his commission. He succeeded Richard Milford Blatchford as Minister to the Papal States. He served until the end of 1867, and was instrumental in apprehending John Surratt in Rome.

== Postbellum career ==
Returning to New York from Rome in 1868, King served for two years as deputy comptroller of customs for the Port of New York. He then retired on account of failing health. He quietly lived in retirement until he died in New York City on October 13, 1876. He is buried in Grace Churchyard, Jamaica, New York.

== Legacy ==
Rufus King International High School, formerly Rufus King High School, in Milwaukee is named for him. The school's teams are known as the Generals.

In the SCP Foundation universe, the "Ouroboros" series of articles depicts King as O5-6, the oldest of the O5 council and founder of the first Mobile Task Force.

== See also ==
- List of American Civil War generals (Union)

Military offices
Preceded by Allan Macdonald	Adjutant General of New York; January 1839 – January 1843	Succeeded by Lyman Sanford
Diplomatic posts
Preceded by Richard M. Blatchford	United States Minister to the Papal States; January 8, 1864 – August 17, 1867	Diplomatic relations severed
