= Richard Waddington =

French parliamentarian and historian

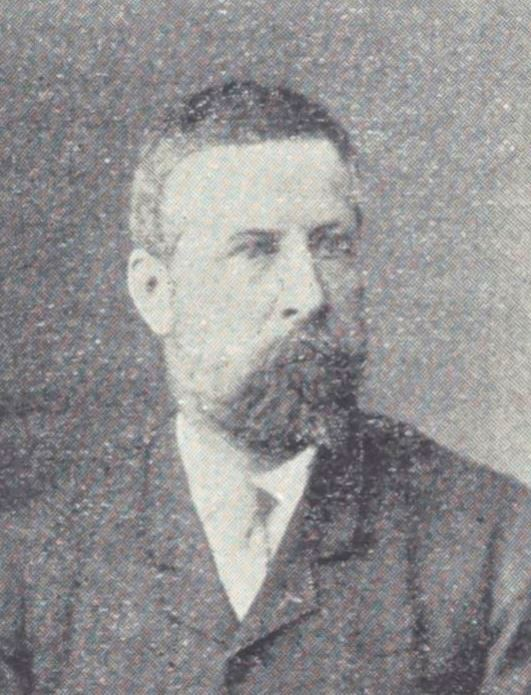
- M. le sénateur Richard Waddington
- Born: 22 May 1838
- Died: 26 June 1913 (aged 75)
- Occupation: historian
- Spouse: Louise Marie Anne Collison (m. 1860)
- Children: Walter Waddington
- Parent(s): Thomas Waddington; Anne Chisholm
- Relatives: William Henry Waddington (brother); Charles Waddington (cousin); Walter Shirley (uncle)

Richard Waddington (22 May 1838 – 26 June 1913) was a French parliamentarian and historian, brother of William Henry (Prime Minister of France) and cousin of Professor Charles Waddington.

== Family business ==
The Waddingtons originally came from Lincolnshire. They became merchant bankers in London and established cotton mills in Lancashire.

His father, Thomas Waddington, took control of the family business ventures in France after his brother William's death in 1821. Senator Waddington's mother was Anne, granddaughter of William Chisholm MD, son of The Chisholm (qv. Roderick Chisholm, 21st Chief of Chisholm).

Richard Waddington was a director of "Établissements Waddington fils et Cie" at Saint-Rémy-sur-Avre in Eure-et-Loir.

== Politics and writing ==
Waddington was elected a Deputy in the French Parliament in 1876, where his industrial experience was valued. He sat on the Centre-Left benches until 1891 when he was elected as Senator for Seine-Inférieure. He returned to the Senate in 1900 and in 1909. He served until his death in 1913.

He wrote Louis XV et le renversement des alliances (Paris: Firmin-Didot et cie, 1896), and La guerre de sept ans: histoire diplomatique et militaire (five volumes, Paris: Firmin-Didot et cie, published 1899–1914).

M. le sénateur Waddington died in 1913. Some of his writings were published later.

=== Marriage ===
In 1860, he married Louise Marie Anne Collison. They had a son, Brigadier-General Walter Waddington (born 1864), a senior French Army officer, who died in Germany in 1920.

== Honours ==
- - Chevalier, Légion d'honneur

== See also ==
- Professor Charles Waddington, cousin of William Henry Waddington
- William Henry Waddington, Prime Minister of France and brother of Richard Waddington
- Alfred Waddington, uncle of Richard Waddington
