= Battle of Pagsanjan =

1899 battle in Laguna, Philippines

- Part of Philippine–American War
Date	April 11, 1899
Location	Pagsanjan, Laguna
Result	American victory

Belligerents
United States	First Philippine Republic

Commanders and leaders
Charles King; Henry Ware Lawton	Pedro Caballes

Strength
140 soldiers	25–30 soldiers

Casualties and losses
1 wounded	8 killed

The Battle of Pagsanjan was a small skirmish between the 1st Battalion of Sharpshooters, under the command of Brigadier General Charles King, and Philippine Nationalists led by Col. Pedro Caballes during the Laguna Campaign of the Philippine–American War.

On April 11, 1899, upon capturing Santa Cruz, General Henry W. Lawton then sought out to capture the town of Pagsanjan from the Filipinos. The expedition began at 6 a.m.

A battalion of sharpshooters was sent ahead of the command as an advance guard, and as they came within 1.5 miles (2 km) of Pagsanjan, they were fired upon by a small force of Filipinos from hastily built breastworks blocking the road.

The sharpshooters returned fire and caused considerable losses to the Filipinos. An artillery piece was then brought up and fired two shrapnel rounds into the breastworks, which were soon abandoned by most of the Filipinos. Some Filipinos remained in the breastworks after the bombardment and were driven out as well after the sharpshooters gave the breastworks another heavy volley.

General Lawton and his command then went on to capture Pagsanjan with no further resistance. Lawton summarized the events in his Report of An Expedition to the province of Laguna, Luzon, Philippine Islands, April 8 to April 17, 1899:

"After advancing along the main road about two miles our scouts developed the enemy strongly entrenched across the road and along an adjacent open field. The column promptly deployed, the artillery brought into action, as had been contemplated and directed in General Field Orders No. 3, given above. The enemy fled precipitately as soon as the artillery opened on them. The insurgent loss was reported as eight dead, left on the field. Our casualty was let Lieut. E. E. Southern, 1st Washingtons, severe wound, right arm.

The advance was resumed toward Pagsanjan and the town occupied without further resistance.

With the exception of two Spaniards who claimed to have escaped from the insurgents, and a few chinese, the town was entirely deserted."

The next day, Lawton's command succeeded in capturing Paete and the Laguna Campaign was over and deemed a success, since the Americans now controlled the Pasig river and their gunboats patrolled the lake.
