= Walter Waddington =

French cavalry officer and general

Walter Francis Chisholm Waddington
- Born: 29 April 1864; Dublin, Ireland
- Died: 23 June 1920 (aged 56); Mainz
- Spouse: Isabella Marie Rowland
- Military career
- Allegiance: France
- Branch: French Army
- Service years: 1885–1920
- Rank: Général de brigade
- Conflicts: Madagascar (1896–1897); First World War (1914–1918); Occupation of the Rhineland (1918–1920)

Walter Francis Chisholm Waddington (29 April 1864 – 23 June 1920) was a French cavalry officer and general. Born in Dublin, Ireland to a British Army officer, he followed his father to France and enlisted in the cavalry. Commissioned within five years, he saw service in Madagascar and was made an officer of the Legion of Honour before being promoted to the rank of général de brigade. Waddington had command of the French 12th Dragoon Brigade in the Occupation of the Rhineland following the First World War, and died there at Mainz on 23 June 1920.

== Early life and career ==
Walter Francis Chisholm Waddington was born on 29 April 1864 in Dublin, Ireland. His father was Richard Pendrell Waddington, who was then serving at the Royal Barracks as a lieutenant in the British Army's Royal Artillery, but later emigrated with his family to France where he became a businessman, army officer, historian and member of the National Assembly and Senate. Walter's mother was Louise Marie Anne Collison Miles Waddington.

Waddington volunteered for a five-year engagement with the 6th Chasseur Regiment on 22 January 1885 at Rouen and was enlisted as a 2nd class chasseur four days later. He was promoted to brigadier (corporal) on 27 July 1885 and to maréchal-des-logis (senior non-commissioned officer) on 30 January 1886. Waddington attended the École d'application de la cavalerie (cavalry training school) in Saumur from 1 October 1888 to 31 August 1889 and graduated second in his class of 130 candidates.

== As a junior officer ==
Waddington received a commission as a sous-lieutenant in the 12th Chasseur Regiment on 17 September 1889 and was promoted to lieutenant on 1 December 1891 and to first lieutenant on 6 January 1895. He served on a special mission to southern Africa from 13 January and was stationed in Madagascar from 14 April to 29 January 1896, when he transferred to the 4th Chasseur Regiment as a first lieutenant. During this time he was praised by his superiors for his calm under pressure and his ceaseless energy, and was assigned many difficult and perilous tasks. Waddington was promoted to captain and transferred to the 10th Hussar Regiment on 10 October 1896, leaving Madagascar on 26 November. He received the Madagascar commemorative medal on 15 January 1896.

Waddington married Isabella Marie Rowland on 17 February 1897 and they lived in Paris with their son. He transferred to the 18th Dragoon Regiment on 21 August 1900 and was promoted to chef d'escadrons in the 7th Dragoon Regiment on 13 October 1906. Waddington taught a practical course at the Saumur school from 3 May to 26 June 1909 and was made a chevalier of the Legion of Honour on 11 July 1909. He was also a 2nd class member of the Russian Order of Saint Stanislaus.

== First World War ==
Waddington was promoted to lieutenant-colonel on 26 March 1912 and transferred back to the 4th Cuirassiers Regiment. Upon the outbreak of war, he was mobilised into the 6th Military Region of France and given command of the cavalry of the 51st Infantry Division and later the 31st Dragoon Regiment. At the start of the war he was commended for leading his groups of squadrons in action against the German forces in Belgium, at Voulpaix and at Mondement-Montgivroux. He was promoted to colonel on 5 May 1915 and given command of his regiment.

Waddington led the regiment at the front at Vezouze and was with them between 12 July and 1 September 1915 at the front at Bezange-la-Grande and later at Leimbach. With the regiment he fought in the Battle of the Somme between July and October 1916 and saw service at the front at Condé-en-Brie before participating in the Second Battle of the Aisne and the Battle of the Hills in 1917. In April 1918 the regiment formed part of the 2nd Cavalry division in Flanders where Waddington received a particularly distinguished mention in dispatches and was described as "valiant amongst the valiant" by General de Rascas. He was promoted to général de brigade with command of the 12th Dragoon Brigade on 11 June 1918. Becoming ill whilst on campaign, he refused to seek treatment for fear of missing an action in the field and led the brigade at the Third Battle of Picardy and in the pursuit of withdrawing German forces towards the end of the war.

Two of Waddington's staff officers stand guard over the coffin at his funeral

Waddington was with the 12th Dragoon Brigade at the time of the Armistice with Germany and was made an officer of the Legion of Honour on 29 December 1918. Waddington was given command of the 7th Dragoon Brigade upon the dissolution of the 12th Dragoon Brigade. He was with this brigade in the French Army of Occupation in Germany when he died, of the illness contracted in Summer 1918, at Mainz on 23 June 1920.

== Funeral ==
Waddington's funeral was attended by many generals and other officers. The honour guard was provided by his entire cavalry brigade together with detachments of troops from the rest of the French Army of the Rhine, flags and standards were flown veiled in black crepe. Those present included chairman of the Inter-Allied Rhineland High Commission, Paul Tirard; commander of the French Army of the Rhine, General Jean Degoutte and generals Georges Demetz and Henri Mordacq (together with at least eleven other French generals). There were delegations from the Belgian, British and American armies as well as Roman Catholic and Jewish chaplains. Degoutte spoke of Waddington as a brilliant military leader and close friend who had served with him in Madagascar and whose untimely death had cut short a promising military career.
