= Charles Waddington (philosopher) =

French philosopher (1819–1914)

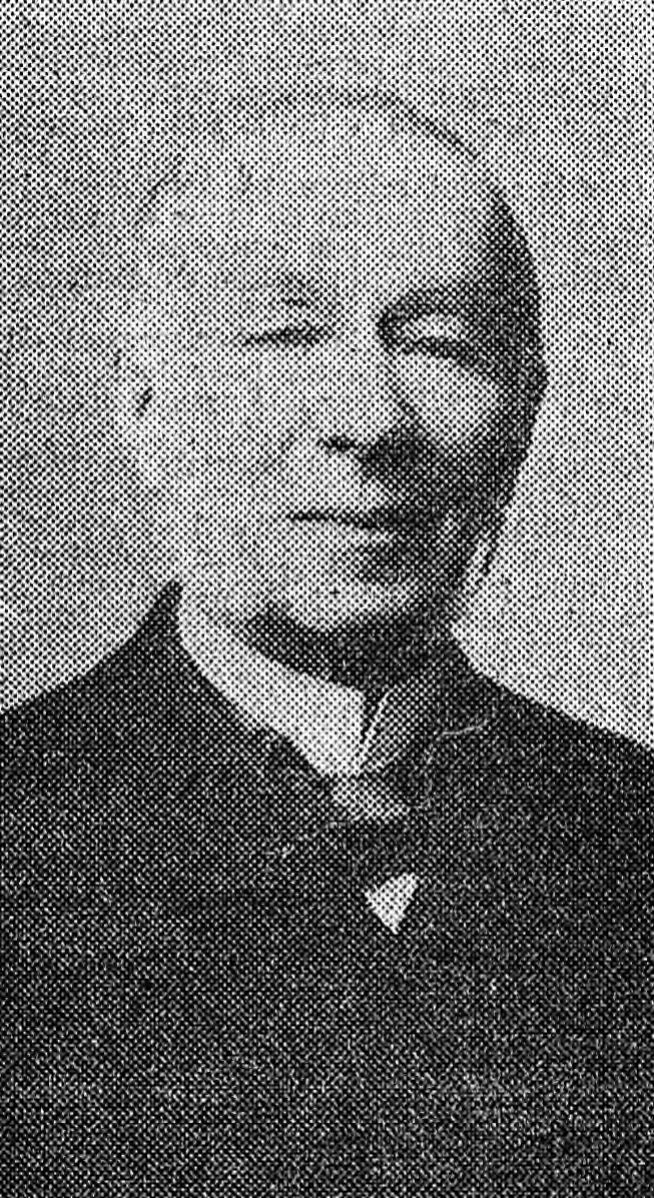
- Born: June 19, 1819; Milan
- Died: March 18, 1914 (aged 94)
- Occupation: Philosopher

Charles-Pendrell Waddington (19 June 1819 – 18 March 1914) was a French philosopher, cousin of Richard and William H. Waddington. He was born in Milan, of a Protestant family of English origin. Graduating from the École normale supérieure at 19, he taught at various institutions, including the Protestant Seminary at Strasbourg, the Lycée Louis-le-Grand, and the Sorbonne, where in 1879 he was appointed professor of ancient philosophy. In 1888 he became a member of the Académie des sciences morales et politiques. His works include:

- Ramus (Pierre de la Ramée): Sa vie, ses écrits et ses opinions (1855)
- Essai de logique (1858)
- De l'idée de Dieu dans l'athéisme contemporain (1859)
- De l'âme humaine, études de psychologie (1863)
- Dieu et la conscience (1870)
- De la science du bien (1875)
- L'athéisme en France à la fin du XVIIIème siècle (1892)
- La philosophie ancienne et la critique historique (1904)

== See also ==
- William Waddington, Prime Minister of France and cousin of Charles Waddington
- Senator Richard Waddington, cousin of Charles Waddington
- Alfred Waddington, uncle of Charles Waddington
