= Grace Episcopal Church Complex (Queens) =

- U.S. National Register of Historic Places
- New York City Landmark
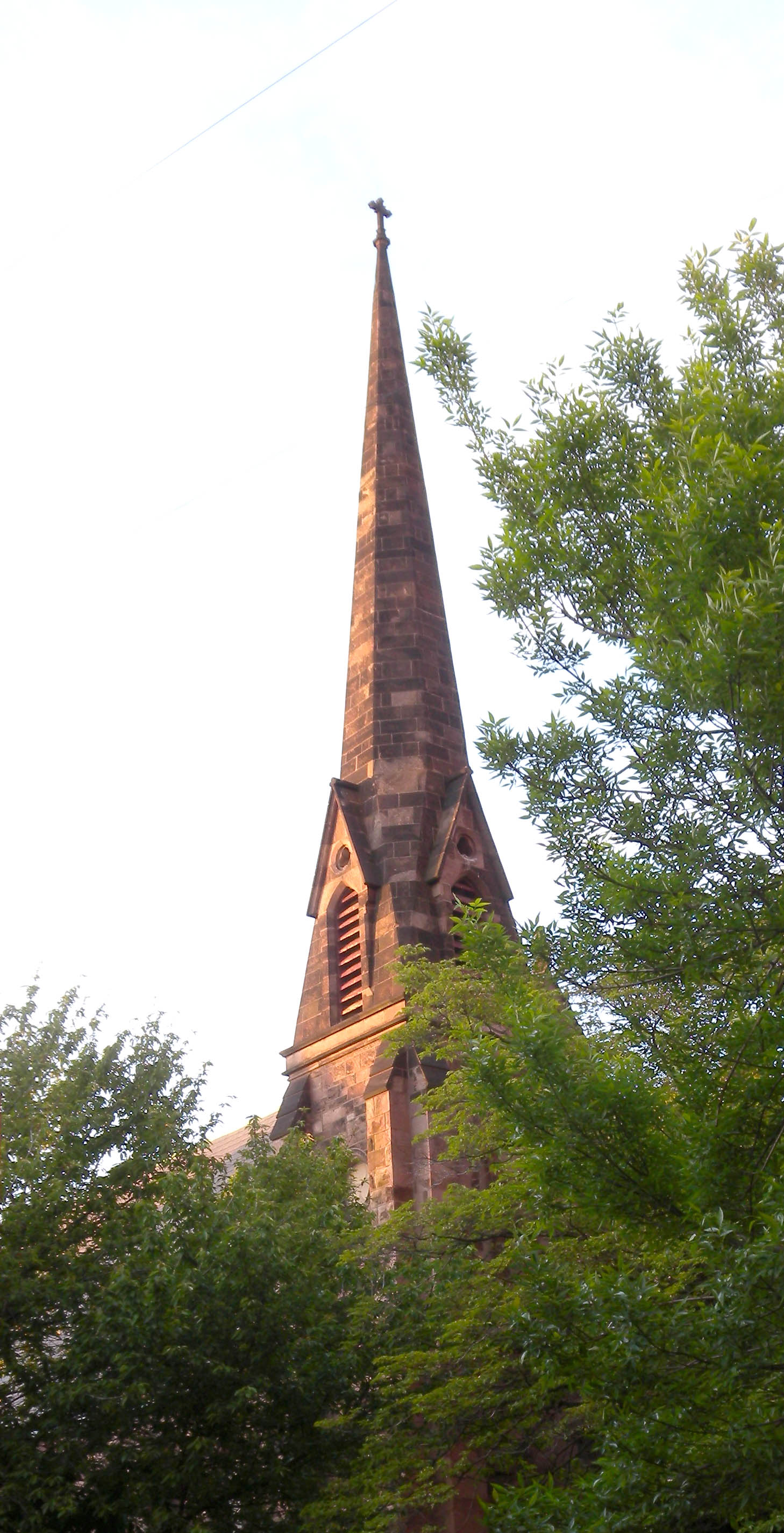

- Location within New York City Location within New York Location within the United States
- Location: 155-15 Jamaica Ave., Jamaica, Queens, New York
- Coordinates: 40°42′14″N 73°48′7″W
- Area: less than one acre
- Built: 1734
- Architect: Dudley Field; Cady, Berg & See
- Architectural style: Gothic Revival, Tudor Revival
- NRHP reference No.: 83001771
- NYCL No.: 0487

Significant dates
- Added to NRHP: September 8, 1983
- Designated NYCL: May 25, 1967

Grace Episcopal Church Complex is a historic Episcopal church complex at 155-15 Jamaica Avenue in Jamaica, Queens, New York City, in U.S. state of New York. The complex includes the church, parish house, and cemetery. The church was built between 1861 and 1862. It is constructed of rough-cut sandstone and features a steeply pitched roof and tall, sharp spire in the Gothic Revival style. A chancel, designed by Cady, Berg & See, was added at the rear of the church in 1901–1902. The parish house, known as Grace Memorial House, was built in 1912. It is three-story brick building in the Tudor Revival style. The surrounding cemetery includes burials dating to 1734, when the church located at this site. Notable interments include Rufus King (1755–1827), Charles King (1789–1867) and William Duer (1743–1799).

== History ==
This church is the oldest Episcopal Church on Long Island, as well as the second-largest in New York State. Grace Episcopal Church was founded in 1702, long before the American Revolution. The parish's unofficial church life began in 1693. During that time, an English organization called the "Society for the Propagation of the Gospel in Foreign Parts" sent a missionary minister to respond to the request made by a group of Jamaica residents. It was founded by the Rev. Patrick Gordon, who was appointed by the Bishop of London to serve as "rector of Queens County with residence in Jamaica". The reason for this response was to provide spiritual help and religious teachings. Gordon died in Jamaica before performing his ministry in 1702, but his duties were succeeded by the Rev. John Bartow. Furthermore, a group of Anglicans founded their own church in 1704. In 1733, around ½ acre of land was provided by many heirs to Thomas Colgan, where the members of the Church of England built their first church; it was christened the "Grace Church", of which its first rector and bishop were the Rev. Thomas Colgan and Rev. Samuel Seabury, respectively. The first church on the present site opened for worship in 1734.

== Figures buried ==
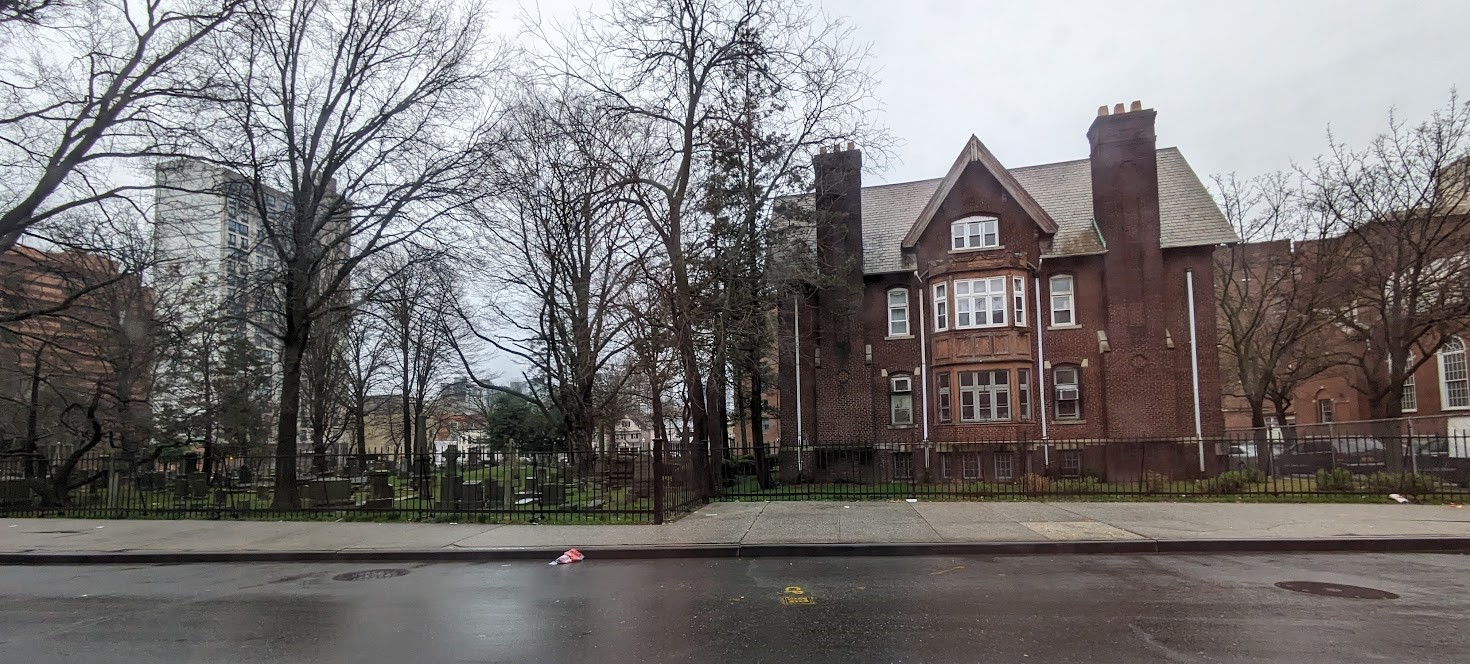
Graveyard and parish house behind the church

Various people have been buried in the cemetery or burial grounds of Grace Episcopal Church. The tombstones of each person have been inscribed with a sacred and emotional message. One such person buried here was Edward Willet. Willett died at the age of 93 on December 8, 1794, and his tombstone contained the following verse: "Exact my soul in the joys that follow from God's Almighty hand. While here my mould'ring body lies to rest at God's Command."

The burial grounds of Grace Episcopal Church are also the resting place of Robert McCormick, a New Yorker and war correspondent. According to Felix T. Cuervo, president of the Native New Yorkers Historical Association, McCormick was a man who sought to "expand the frontiers of the Old West and was also a conservationist, who did much to protect our native wild life." As a war correspondent, McCormick provided detailed accounts and descriptions of his experiences during both the Crimean War and the American Civil War. Additionally, he was also a member of the new Republican Party and a friend of Abraham Lincoln.

== Activities, services and recreation ==
Aside from holding weekly prayers and masses, Grace Episcopal Church has also hosted a number of special events for its community. October 1966 marked the 262nd anniversary of the founding of Grace Episcopal Church. To celebrate the occasion, the rector (the Rev. Philip F. Lewis) conducted and held anniversary services, assisted by the Rev. Joseph H. Titus, who retired the previous year. The church's anniversary also provided a display featuring the royal charter granted by King George of Great Britain, and ancient silver chalice (one of eight remaining in the United States), a painted coat of arms of the church provided by Queen Anne of Great Britain, and a set of six collection plates ("alms bassins").

Grace Episcopal Church has been known for volunteering its services toward gun control and removals. In August 1980, five churches, Grace Episcopal Church included, were named as places where those possessing illegal firearms turned in their weapons: this was done under the city's amnesty program. Mayor Koch and Dr. Robert Polk of the Council of Churches felt it best to use five houses of worship, where the weapons would be accepted with no issues or complications for the volunteers. Threats of arrest were dismissed as part of this service, as were questions and the provision of names. This amnesty program went into effect on July 10, 1980, and ended in August when a tougher gun law was enacted. Around 163 guns were surrendered.

In August 1995, the church welcomed the Black Heritage Foundation and Cultural Collaborative Jamaica, which, in association with the New York Foundation on the Arts, presented several jazz musicians to perform for fans and residents of Queens. The performers included the Bross Townsend Orchestra, composed of Bross Townsend (on the piano), John Dooley (on bass), Walter Perkins (on drums), Bubber Brooks (on tenor saxophone), Fred Smith (trumpet), and 80-year-old Al Casey, a "pioneer of the amplified guitar." This free jazz concert provided an in-depth, historical perspective on jazz and the contributions made by jazz pioneers.

== Symbolism and significance of the church ==
Grace Episcopal Church is seen by many people as "a place of inspiration." Historians view this structure to be an ancient institution with an interesting and trouble past.

== Vandalism ==
In 1957, the church was struck by vandalism, when a dozen tombstones within its burial grounds were smashed and another dozen toppled. Some of these tombstones were 100 years old. The tombstones belonging to Charles and Henrietta King, and those of the Cornell family, were among those smashed. Sergeant Paul Keane of the Jamaica Squad, ascertained that this was the result of "teenage hoodlums."

== Landmark status ==
It was listed as a New York City Landmark in 1967 and added to the National Register of Historic Places in 1983. However, the church members fought to prevent or cease these actions in 2010. A campaign was launched in December 2010 by members of the Grace Episcopal Church; their intention was to meet with members of city council in order to overrule the Landmarks Preservation Commission's designation of the Church as a historical landmark when it voted the following year. According to the Rev. Darryl James, this designation "siphons off potential funding." The nearby Grace Episcopal Church Memorial Hall was listed separately as a New York City Landmark in 2010.

== See also ==
- List of New York City Designated Landmarks in Queens
- National Register of Historic Places listings in Queens County, New York
