= Saint-Rémy-sur-Avre =

- Commune
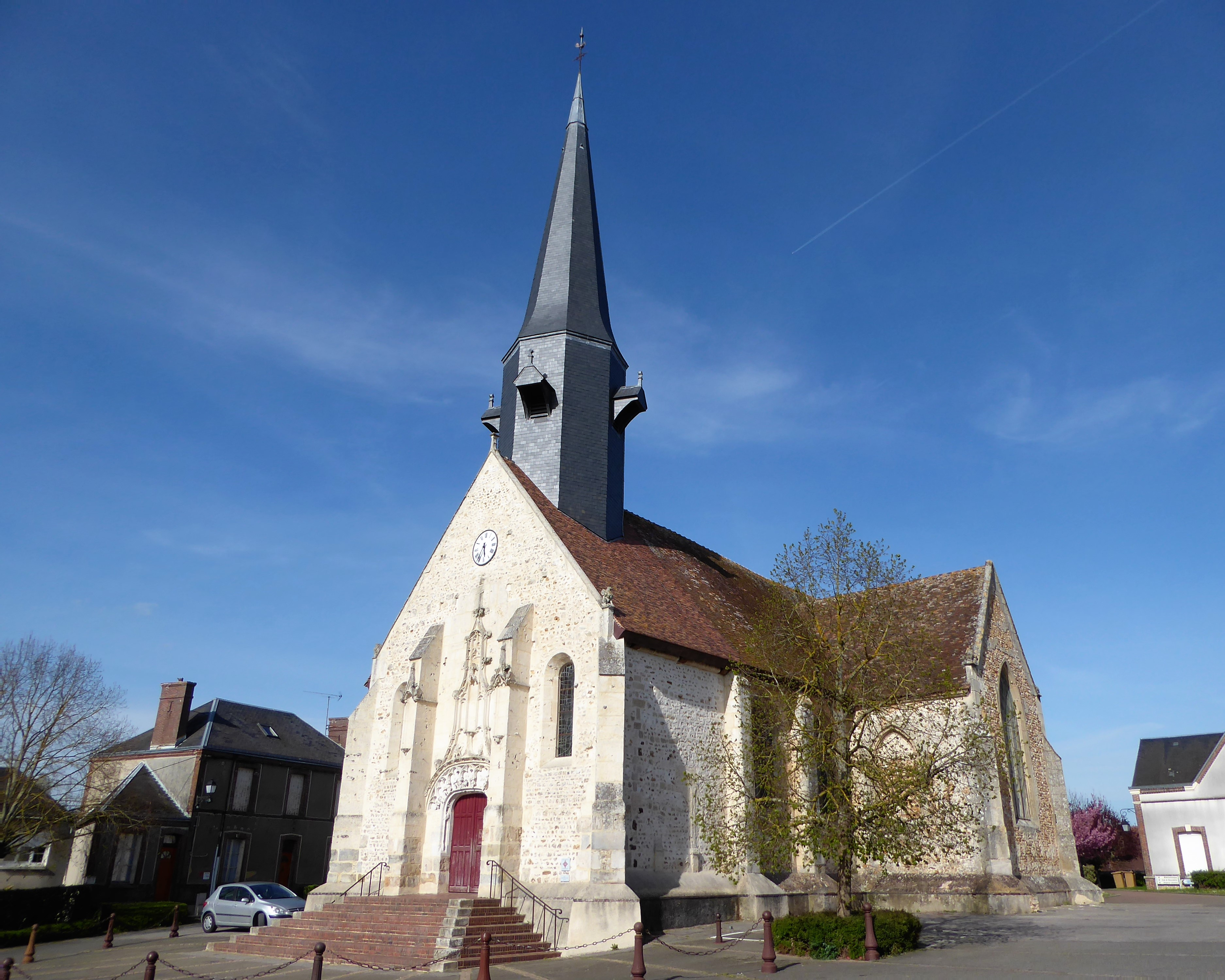
- The church in Saint-Rémy-sur-Avre

- Coat of arms
- Location of Saint-Rémy-sur-Avre
- Location within France Location within Centre-Val de Loire
- Coordinates: 48°45′43″N 1°14′35″E
- Country: France
- Region: Centre-Val de Loire
- Department: Eure-et-Loir
- Arrondissement: Dreux
- Canton: Saint-Lubin-des-Joncherets
- Intercommunality: CA Pays de Dreux

Government
  - Mayor (2020–2026): Patrick Riehl
- Area^{1}: 13.05 km^{2} (5.04 sq mi)
- Elevation: 100 m (330 ft)
- Highest elevation: 164 m (538 ft)
- Lowest elevation: 90 m (300 ft)
- Population (2023): 4,058
  - Density: 311.0/km^{2} (805.4/sq mi)
- Time zone: UTC+01:00 (CET)
  - Summer (DST): UTC+02:00 (CEST)
- INSEE/Postal code: 28359 /28380
- ^{1} French Land Register data, which excludes lakes, ponds, glaciers > 1 km^{2} (0.386 sq mi or 247 acres) and river estuaries.

Saint-Rémy-sur-Avre (French pronunciation: [sɛ̃ ʁemi syʁ avʁ], literally Saint-Rémy on Avre) is a commune in the Eure-et-Loir department in northern France.

== Population ==
Historical population
| Year | Pop. | ±% p.a. |
|---|---|---|
| 1968 | 1,876 | — |
| 1975 | 2,524 | +4.33% |
| 1982 | 3,034 | +2.66% |
| 1990 | 3,568 | +2.05% |
| 1999 | 3,553 | −0.05% |
| 2007 | 3,650 | +0.34% |
| 2012 | 3,763 | +0.61% |
| 2017 | 4,010 | +1.28% |
| 2023 | 4,058 | +0.20% |
Source: INSEE

== See also ==
- Communes of the Eure-et-Loir department
