= Rufus King =

American Founding Father (1755–1827)

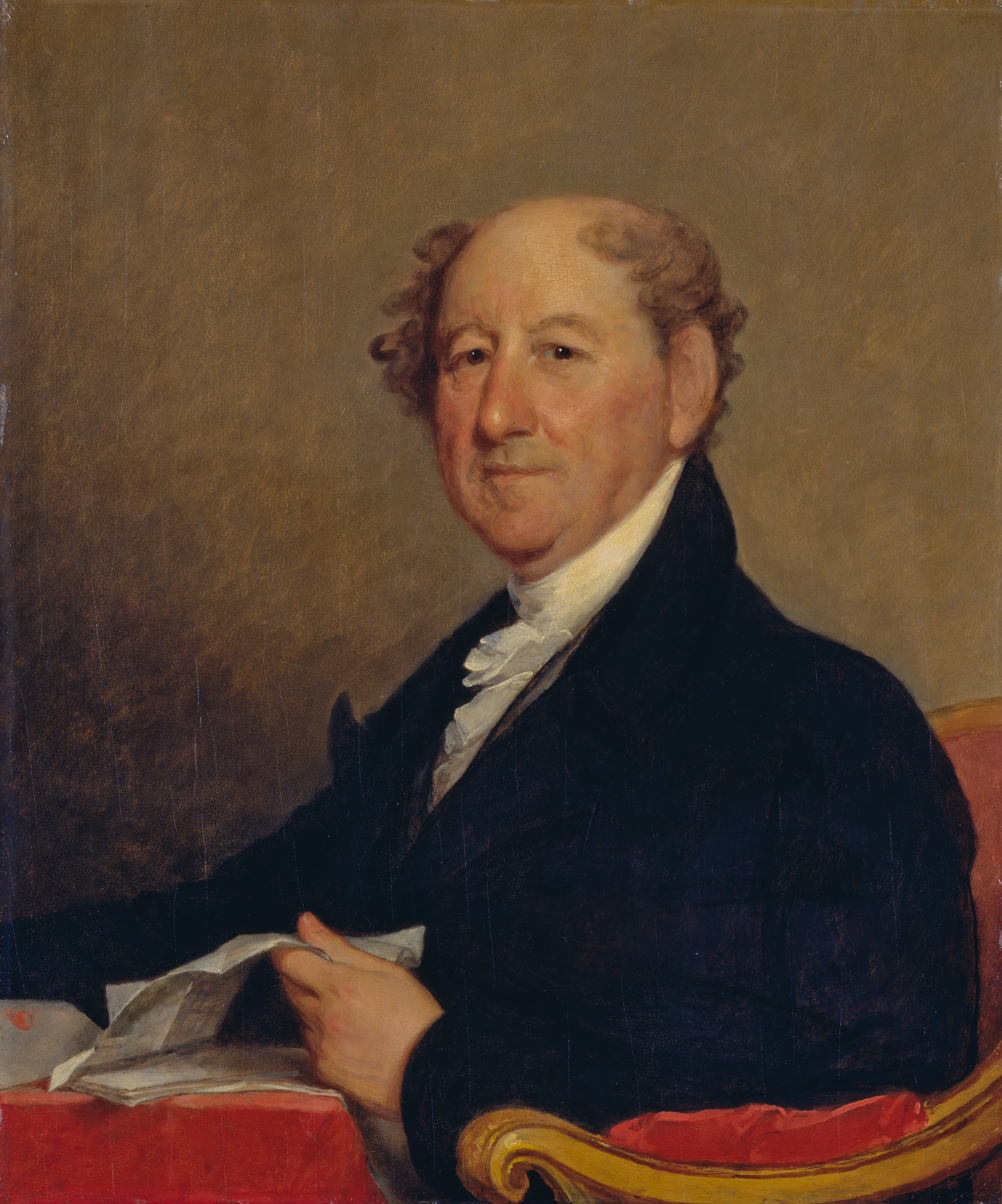
- Portrait by Gilbert Stuart, c. 1819–1820

United States Senator from New York
- In office March 4, 1813 – March 3, 1825
- Preceded by: John Smith
- Succeeded by: Nathan Sanford
- In office July 25, 1789 – May 23, 1796
- Preceded by: Seat established
- Succeeded by: John Laurance

United States Minister to the United Kingdom
- In office November 11, 1825 – June 16, 1826
- Nominated by: John Quincy Adams
- Preceded by: Richard Rush
- Succeeded by: Albert Gallatin
- In office July 27, 1796 – May 16, 1803
- Nominated by: George Washington; John Adams; Thomas Jefferson
- Preceded by: Thomas Pinckney
- Succeeded by: James Monroe

Personal details
- Born: March 24, 1755 Scarborough, Province of Massachusetts Bay, British America
- Died: April 29, 1827 (aged 72) Jamaica, New York, U.S.
- Resting place: Grace Episcopal Churchyard
- Party: Federalist
- Spouse: Mary Alsop
- Children: 10, including James, John, Charles, Edward
- Education: Harvard College (AB)

Rufus King (March 24, 1755 – April 29, 1827) was an American Founding Father, lawyer, politician, and diplomat. He was a delegate from Massachusetts to the Continental Congress and the Philadelphia Convention and was one of the signers of the United States Constitution in 1787. After formation of the new Congress, he represented New York in the United States Senate. He emerged as a leading member of the Federalist Party and was the party's last presidential nominee during the 1816 presidential election.

The son of a prosperous Massachusetts merchant, King studied law before he volunteered for the militia during the American Revolutionary War. He won election to the Massachusetts General Court in 1783 and to the Congress of the Confederation the following year. At the 1787 Philadelphia Convention, he emerged as a leading nationalist and called for increased powers for the federal government. After the convention, King returned to Massachusetts, where he used his influence to help ratify the Constitution. At the urging of Alexander Hamilton, he then abandoned his law practice and moved to New York City.

He won election to represent New York in the United States Senate in 1789 and remained in office until 1796. That year, he accepted President George Washington's appointment to the position of Minister to Great Britain. Though King aligned with Hamilton's Federalist Party, the Democratic-Republican President Thomas Jefferson retained King's services after Jefferson's victory in the 1800 presidential election. King served as the Federalist vice-presidential candidate in the 1804 and 1808 elections and ran on an unsuccessful ticket with Charles Cotesworth Pinckney of South Carolina. Though most Federalists supported the Democratic-Republican DeWitt Clinton in the 1812 presidential election, King, without the support of his party, won the few votes of the Federalists who were unwilling to support Clinton's candidacy. In 1813, King returned to the Senate and remained in office until 1825.

King, the de facto Federalist nominee for president in 1816, lost in a landslide to James Monroe. The Federalist Party became defunct at the national level after 1816, and King was the last presidential nominee whom the party fielded. Nonetheless, King was able to remain in the Senate until 1825, which made him the last Federalist senator because of a split in the New York Democratic-Republican Party. King then accepted President John Quincy Adams's appointment to serve another term as ambassador to Great Britain, but ill health forced King to retire from public life, and he died in 1827. King had five children who lived to adulthood, and he has had numerous notable descendants.

== Early life ==
Rufus King was born on March 24, 1755, in Scarborough, Massachusetts (now part of Maine). He was a son of Isabella (Bragdon) and Richard King, a prosperous farmer, merchant, lumberman, and sea captain who had settled at Dunstan Landing in Scarborough, near Portland, Maine, and had made a modest fortune by the time Rufus was born. His financial success aroused the jealousy of his neighbors, and when the unpopular Stamp Act 1765 was imposed, a mob ransacked his house and destroyed most of the furniture. Nobody was punished, and the next year, the mob burned down his barn. John Adams once referred to that moment in discussing limitations of the "mob" for the Constitutional Convention and wrote a letter to his wife, Abigail, in which he described the scene:

I am engaged in a famous Cause: The Cause of King, of Scarborough vs. a Mob, that broke into his House, and rifled his Papers, and terrifyed him, his Wife, Children and Servants in the Night. The Terror, and Distress, the Distraction and Horror of this Family cannot be described by Words or painted upon Canvass. It is enough to move a Statue, to melt an Heart of Stone, to read the Story....

Richard King was a Loyalist during the American Revolutionary War, but all his sons became Patriots.

== Education and early career ==
King attended Dummer Academy (now The Governor's Academy) from the age of twelve in South Byfield, Massachusetts. Later, he attended Harvard College, where he graduated in 1777. He began to read law under Theophilus Parsons, but his studies were interrupted in 1778, when King volunteered for militia duty during the American Revolutionary War. Appointed a major, he served as an aide to General John Sullivan during the Battle of Rhode Island. After the campaign, King returned to his apprenticeship under Parsons. He was admitted to the bar in 1780 and began a legal practice in Newburyport, Massachusetts.

== Political career ==
=== Constitutional Convention ===
King was first elected to the Massachusetts General Court in 1783 and returned there yearly until 1785. Massachusetts sent him to the Confederation Congress from 1784 to 1787.

In 1787, King was sent to the Constitutional Convention, which was held in Philadelphia. Despite his youthful stature, King held a significant position at the convention since "he numbered among the most capable orators." Along with James Madison, "he became a leading figure in the nationalist causes." Furthermore, he attended every session. King's major involvements included serving on the Committee on Postponed Matters and the Committee of Style and Arrangement.

Although when he came to the convention, he was still unconvinced that major changes should be made in the Articles of Confederation, his views underwent a startling transformation over the debates. He worked with Chairman William Samuel Johnson, James Madison, Gouverneur Morris, and Alexander Hamilton on the Committee of Style and Arrangement to prepare a final draft of the U.S. Constitution. King was one of the most prominent delegates namely because of playing "a major role in the laborious crafting of the fundamental governing character." The Constitution was signed on September 17 but needed to be ratified by the states. After signing the Constitution, he returned home. He went to work to get the Constitution ratified and unsuccessfully positioned himself to be named to the U.S. Senate. The ratification passed by the narrow margin of 187–168. With the ratification passed, Massachusetts became the sixth state to ratify the constitution in early February 1788.

King was indirectly responsible for the passing of this ratification because his "learned, informative, and persuasive speeches" convinced a "popular, vain merchant and prince-turned-politicians to abandon his anti-federalism and approve the new organic law."

=== Later career ===
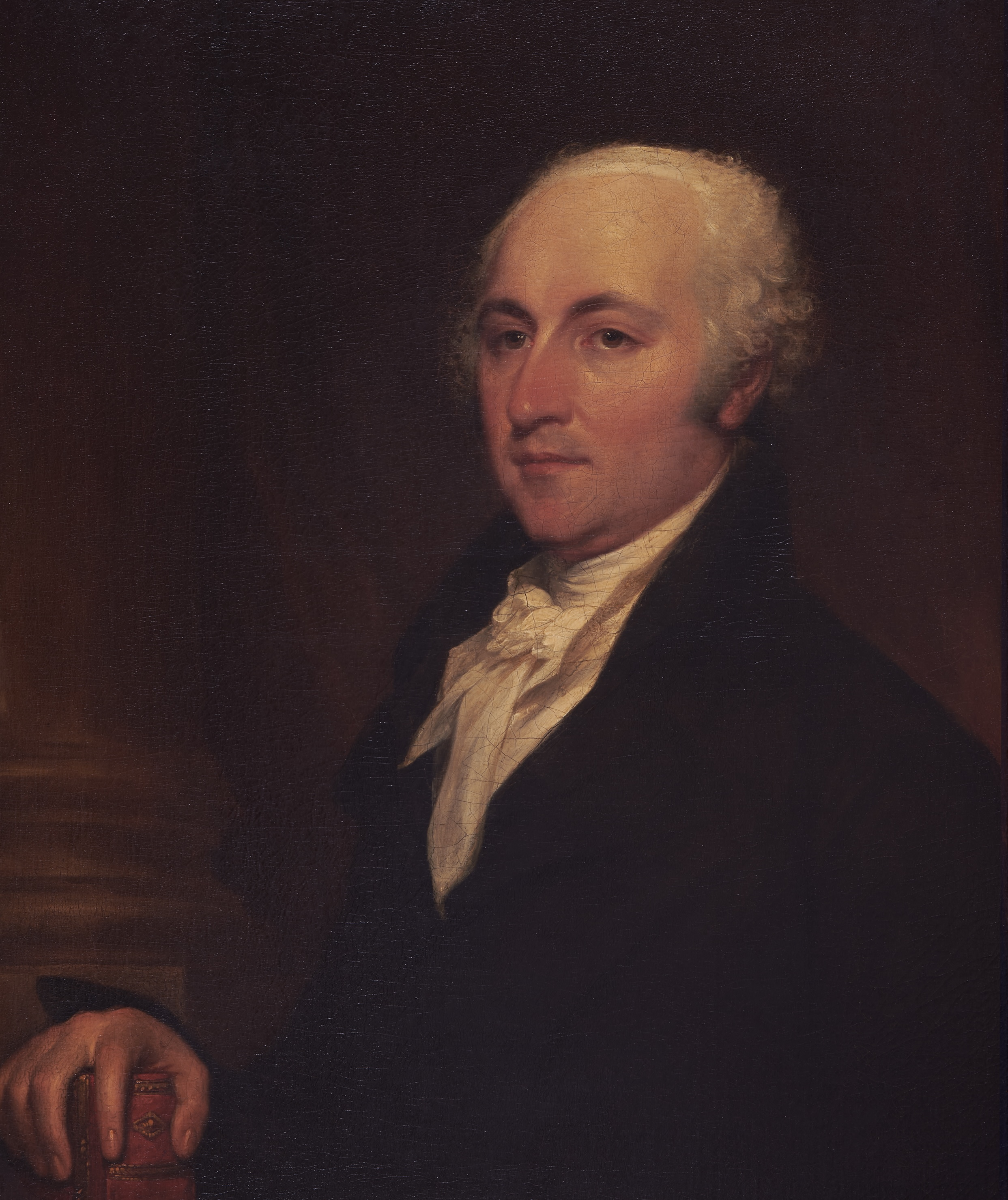
Portrait by John Trumbull, c. 1800

After his early political experiences during the Constitutional Convention, King decided to switch his vocational calling by "[abandoning] his law practice [in 1788], [and] moved from the Bay State to Gotham, and entered the New York political forum." At Hamilton's urging, King moved to New York City and was elected to the New York State Assembly in 1789. Shortly afterwards, he was elected as Senator from New York and was re-elected in 1795. King declined an appointment as Secretary of State to succeed Edmund Randolph. In 1795, King helped Hamilton defend the controversial Jay Treaty by writing pieces for New York newspapers under the pseudonym "Camillus." Of the 38 installments in the series, King wrote nine numbers 23–30, 34, and 35, in which he discussed the treaty's maritime and commercial aspects. He was re-elected in 1795 but resigned on May 23, 1796, after he had been appointed U.S. Minister by George Washington to Great Britain. John Skey Eustace was angry at King, when he was ordered to leave the country and published an offensive pamphlet. Even though King was an outspoken Federalist politically, President Thomas Jefferson, upon his elevation to the presidency, refused to recall him. In 1803, King voluntarily relinquished his position.

King then returned to elected politics, for a long time with little success, but he later returned to the Senate. In April 1804, King ran unsuccessfully for the Senate from New York. Later that year and again in 1808, King and another signer of the Constitution, Charles Cotesworth Pinckney, were candidates for vice president and president, respectively, fronting a Federalist Party in decline. Accordingly, they had no realistic chance against the Democratic-Republican Thomas Jefferson, and they received only 27.2% of the popular vote and lost by 45.6%, marking the highest recess in presidential election history. In 1808, both candidates were nominated again and lost against James Madison, gaining 32.4% of the popular vote.

In September 1812, the unpopular War of 1812 against Great Britain helped the opposing Federalists to regain their reputation, King led an effort at the Federalist Party caucus to nominate a ticket for the presidential election that year, but the effort failed, as the Democratic-Republican DeWitt Clinton had the best chances to defeat his fellow party member Madison, which made the Federalists field no candidate. However, some sought to make King the nominee to have a candidate under the Federalist banner on the ballot, and though little came of it, he finished third in the popular vote, with approximately 2% of the total. Shortly thereafter, King celebrated his first success after ten years by being elected to his "second tenure on Senate" in 1813.

In April 1816, he ran for governor of New York but lost to Daniel D. Tompkins. In the fall of that year, he became the informal presidential nominee for the Federalist Party, as it did not meet for any convention. He received only 30.9% of the popular vote and lost again, this time to James Monroe, whose running mate, coincidentally, was Tompkins. King was the last presidential candidate by the Federalists before their collapse.

When he ran for re-election to the Senate in 1819, he ran as a Federalist even though the party was already disbanding and had only a small minority in the New York State Legislature. However, because of the split of the Democratic-Republicans, no successor was elected to the U.S. Senate in 1819, and the seat remained vacant until January 1820. Trying to attract the former Federalist voters to their side at the next gubernatorial election in April 1820, both factions of the Democratic-Republican Party supported King, who served another term in the U.S. Senate until March 3, 1825. The Federalist Party had already ceased to exist on the federal stage. During King's second tenure in the Senate, he continued his career as an opponent of slavery, which he denounced as anathema to the principles underlying the Declaration of Independence and the Constitution. In what is considered the greatest speech of his career, he spoke against admitting Missouri as a slave state in 1820.

== Diplomat ==
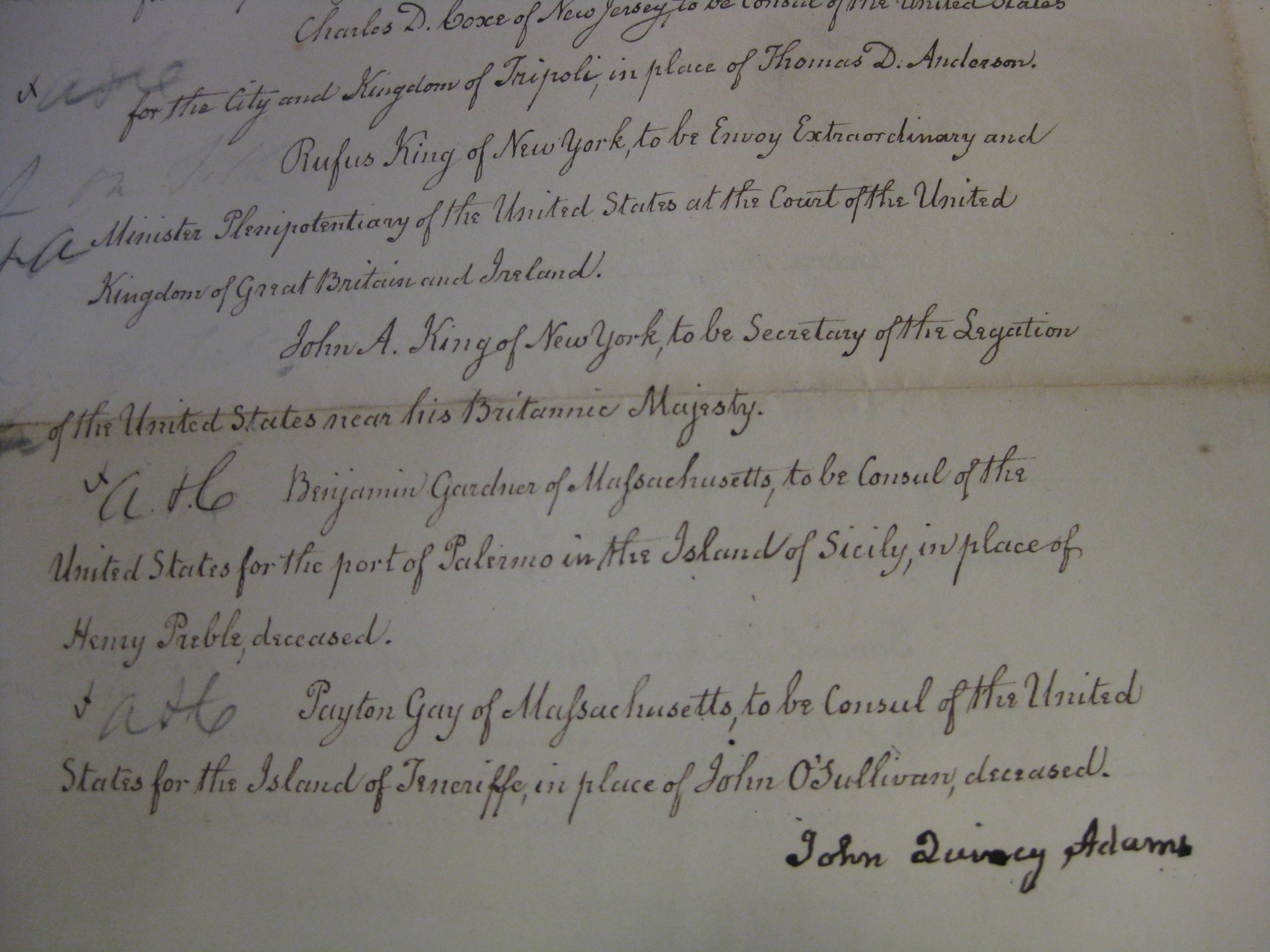
King's 1825 nomination to be minister to Great Britain

King played a major diplomatic role as minister to the Court of St James's from 1796 to 1803 and again from 1825 to 1826. Although he was a leading Federalist, Thomas Jefferson kept him in office until King asked to be relieved. Some prominent accomplishments that King had from his time as a national diplomat include a term of friendly relations with Great Britain and the United States, at least until it became hostile in 1805. With that in mind, he successfully reached a compromise on the passing of the Jay Treaty and was an avid supporter of it.

King was outspoken against potential Irish immigration to the United States in the wake of the Irish Rebellion of 1798. In a September 13, 1798, letter to the Duke of Portland, King said of potential Irish refugees, "I certainly do not think they will be a desirable acquisition to any Nation, but in none would they be likely to prove more mischievous than in mine, where from the sameness of language and similarity of Laws and Institutions they have greater opportunities of propagating their principles than in any other Country." Also, while in Britain, King was in close personal contact with the South American revolutionary Francisco de Miranda and facilitated Miranda's trip to the United States in search of support for his failed 1806 expedition to Venezuela.

Soon after his second term in the Senate ended, King was appointed minister to Great Britain again, this time by U.S. President John Quincy Adams. However, he was forced to return home a few months later because of his failing health. He then retired from public life. Adams initially offered the role to New York Governor DeWitt Clinton.

== Anti-slavery activity ==
Though King had been a slaveholder as a young man, he became a prominent opponent of slavery. King had a long history of opposition to the expansion of slavery and the slave trade. That stand was a product of moral conviction, which coincided with the political realities of New England Federalists. While in Congress, he successfully added provisions to the 1787 Northwest Ordinance that barred the extension of slavery into the Northwest Territory. However, he also said he was willing "to suffer the continuance of slaves until they can be gradually emancipated in states already overrun with them." He referred to slavery as a "nefarious institution." In 1817, he supported Senate action to abolish the domestic slave trade, and in 1819, he spoke strongly for the anti-slavery amendment to the Missouri statehood bill. In 1819, his arguments were political, economic, and humanitarian. The extension of slavery would adversely affect the security of the principles of freedom and liberty. After the Missouri Compromise, he continued to support gradual emancipation in various ways. In 1821, he fought against attempts to include a discriminatory clause in New York's Constitution that aimed to restrict suffrage on racial grounds, arguing that such a restriction was unconstitutional.

== Library ==
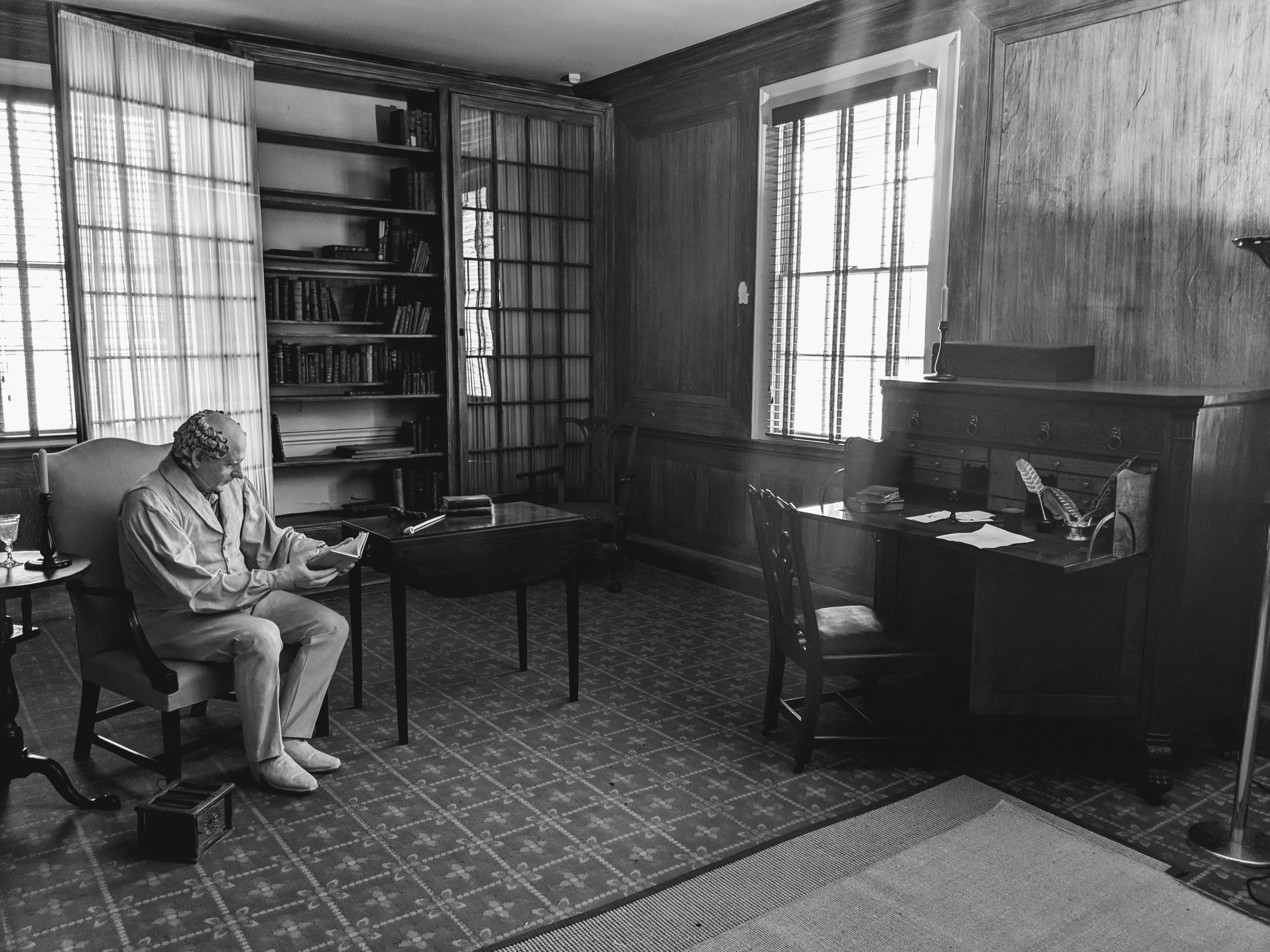
Statue of King in his Jamaica, Queens, library

At the time of his death in 1827, King had a library of roughly 2,200 titles in 3,500 volumes. In addition, King had roughly 200 bound volumes containing thousands of pamphlets. King's son John Alsop King inherited the library and kept it in Jamaica, Queens, until his death in 1867. The books then went to John's son, Dr. Charles Ray King, of Bucks County, Pennsylvania. They remained in Pennsylvania until they were donated to the New-York Historical Society in 1906, where most of them currently reside. Some books have extensive marginalia. In addition, six commonplace books survive in his papers at the New York Historical Society.

== Other accomplishments ==
In his lifetime, King was an avid supporter of Alexander Hamilton and his fiscal programs and became a director of the Hamilton-sponsored First Bank of the United States. Among other prominent things that occurred in his life, King was first elected a fellow of the American Academy of Arts and Sciences in 1805 and was elected a member of the American Antiquarian Society in 1814. Contrary to his previous position on the national bank of the United States, King found himself denying the reopening of a Second Bank of the United States in 1816. In 1822, he was admitted as an honorary member of the New York Society of the Cincinnati.

== Family ==
Coat of Arms of Rufus King

Many of King's family were also involved in politics, and he had numerous prominent descendants. His brother William King was the first governor of Maine and a prominent merchant, and his other brother, Cyrus King, was a U.S. representative from Massachusetts.

His wife, Mary Alsop, was born in New York on October 17, 1769, and died in Jamaica, New York, on June 5, 1819. She was the only daughter of John Alsop, a wealthy merchant and a delegate for New York to the Continental Congress from 1774 to 1776. She was a great-niece of Governor John Winthrop of the Massachusetts Bay Colony. She married King in New York City on March 30, 1786.

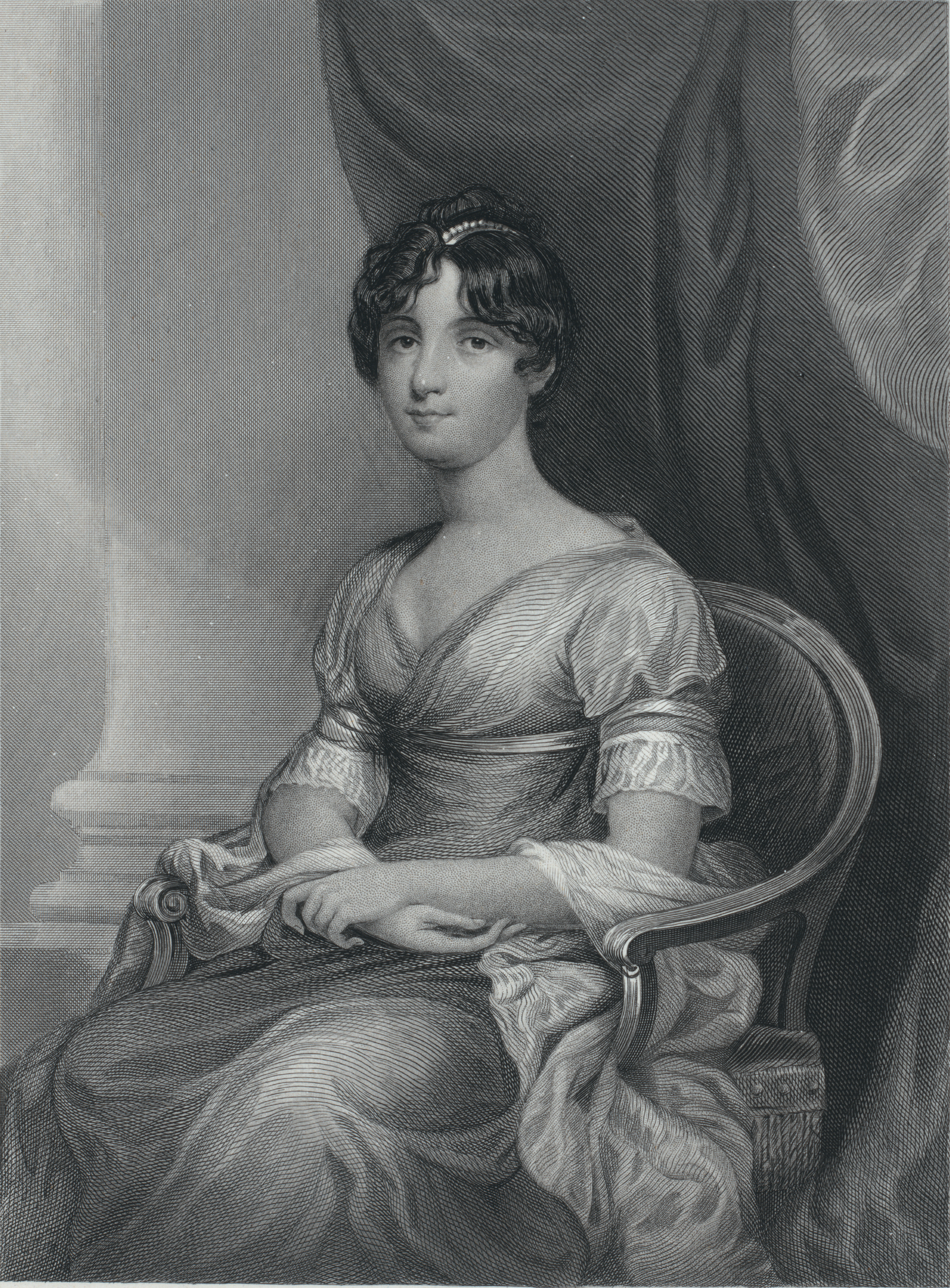
Mrs. Rufus King, (Mary Alsop)

Mary King was a lady of remarkable beauty, gentle and gracious manners, and well cultivated mind, and adorned the high station, both in England and at home, that her husband's official positions and their own social relations entitled them to occupy. A King family member once wrote to their wife of her beauty and personality: "Tell Betsy King [Rufus's half-sister] her sister is a beauty. She is vastly the best looking woman I have seen since I have been in this city.... She is a good hearted woman, and, I think, possesses all that Benevolence and kind, friendly disposition, that never fail to find respectable admirers." Her "remarkable beauty" and "well cultivated manner" seemed to help the Kings in the type of lifestyle in which they lived, one in which the Kings found themselves in "fashionable circles and entertained frequently... (potentially helped by how "[Mrs. King] was widely admired in New York society; her retiring nature set her apart."). The Kings had seven children, of which five managed to live to adulthood. On June 5, 1819, Mrs. King died. "She was buried in the old churchyard of Grace Church." Rufus King remarked on her death regarding his wife, "The example of her life is worthy of the imitation of us all."

Rufus King died on April 29, 1827, and his funeral was held at his New York home in Jamaica, Queens. He is buried in the Grace Church Cemetery, in Jamaica, Queens. The home that King purchased in 1805 and expanded thereafter and some of his farm make up King Park in Queens. The home, called King Manor, is now a museum open to the public. The Rufus King School, also known as P.S. 26, in Fresh Meadows, New York, was named after King, as was the Rufus King Hall on the City University of New York Queens College campus and King Street in Madison, Wisconsin.

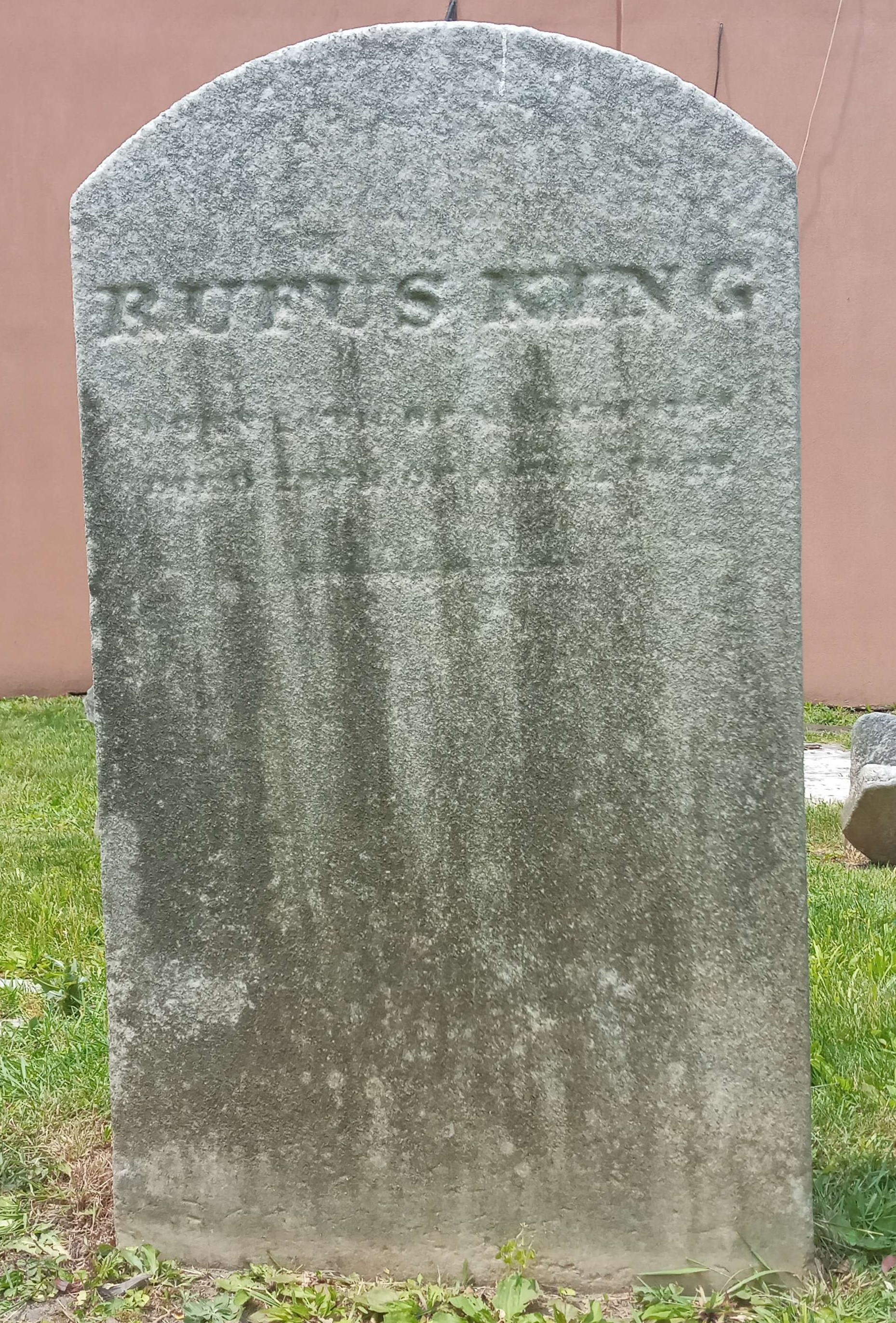
The gravesite of Rufus King

=== Descendants and relatives ===
Rufus King's descendants and relatives number in the thousands today. Some of his notable descendants include the following:

- Dr. C. Loring Brace IV was a noted biological anthropologist.
- Gerald Warner Brace (1901–1978) was an American writer, educator, sailor, and boat builder.
- Charles Loring Brace (1826–1890) was a philanthropist and was most renowned for founding the Children's Aid Society.
- Wolcott Gibbs was an American editor, humorist, theater critic, playwright, and author of short stories.
- Archibald Gracie III was a career United States Army officer, businessman, and a graduate of West Point. He is well known for being a Confederate brigadier general during the American Civil War and for his death during the Siege of Petersburg.
- Archibald Gracie IV was an American writer, amateur historian, real estate investor, and survivor of the sinking of the RMS Titanic.
- Fleet Admiral William Frederick Halsey Jr., United States Navy
- Isabella Beecher Hooker (1822–1907) was a leader in the women's suffrage movement and an author.
- Charles King (academic) was an American academic, politician, and newspaper editor and the ninth president of Columbia College (now Columbia University).
- Charles King was a United States soldier and a distinguished writer.
- James G. King was an American businessman and Whig Party politician who represented New Jersey's 5th congressional district in the U.S. House of Representatives. His daughter, Frederika Gore King, married Bancroft Davis.
- John Alsop King was an American politician who served as governor (1857–1859) of New York.
- Rufus King was a newspaper editor, educator, U.S. diplomat, and Union brigadier general during the American Civil War.
- Rufus King Jr. was an artillery officer in the Union Army during the American Civil War and a Medal of Honor recipient.
- Rufus Gunn King III was the chief judge of the Superior Court of the District of Columbia.
- Alice Duer Miller was an American writer and poet.
- Halsey Minor is a technology entrepreneur who founded CNET in 1993.
- Mary Alsop King Waddington was an American author.

== See also ==
- List of United States political appointments that crossed party lines

== Works cited ==
- Howe, Daniel (2007). What Hath God Wrought: The Transformation of America, 1815–1848. Oxford University Press. ISBN 978-0-19-507894-7.

=== Bibliography ===
- Brush, Edward Hale. Rufus King and His Times. New York: Nicholas L. Brown, 1926.
- King, Charles R. The Life and Correspondence of Rufus King, 4 vol. 1893–1897.
- Perkins, Bradford. The First Rapprochement: England and the United States, 1795–1805. University of California Press, 1967.

U.S. Senate
New seat	U.S. Senator (Class 3) from New York; 1789–1796; Served alongside: Philip Schuyler, Aaron Burr	Succeeded by John Laurance
Preceded by John Smith	U.S. Senator (Class 3) from New York; 1813–1819; Served alongside: Obadiah German, Nathan Sanford	Vacant
Vacant	U.S. Senator (Class 3) from New York; 1820–1825; Served alongside: Nathan Sanford, Martin Van Buren	Succeeded by Nathan Sanford
Preceded by James Barbour	Chair of the Senate Foreign Relations Committee; 1821–1822	Succeeded by James Barbour
Diplomatic posts
Preceded by Thomas Pinckney	United States Minister to the United Kingdom; United States Minister to Great Britain; 1796–1803	Succeeded by James Monroe
Preceded by Richard Rush	United States Envoy to the United Kingdom; 1826–1826	Succeeded by Albert Gallatin
Party political offices
Preceded by Charles Cotesworth Pinckney	Federalist nominee for Vice President of the United States; 1804, 1808	Succeeded by Jared Ingersoll
Preceded by Stephen Van Rensselaer	Federalist nominee for Governor of New York; 1816	Party abolished
Preceded by DeWitt Clinton	Federalist nominee for President of the United States; 1816	Party abolished
