= Columbia University commencement =

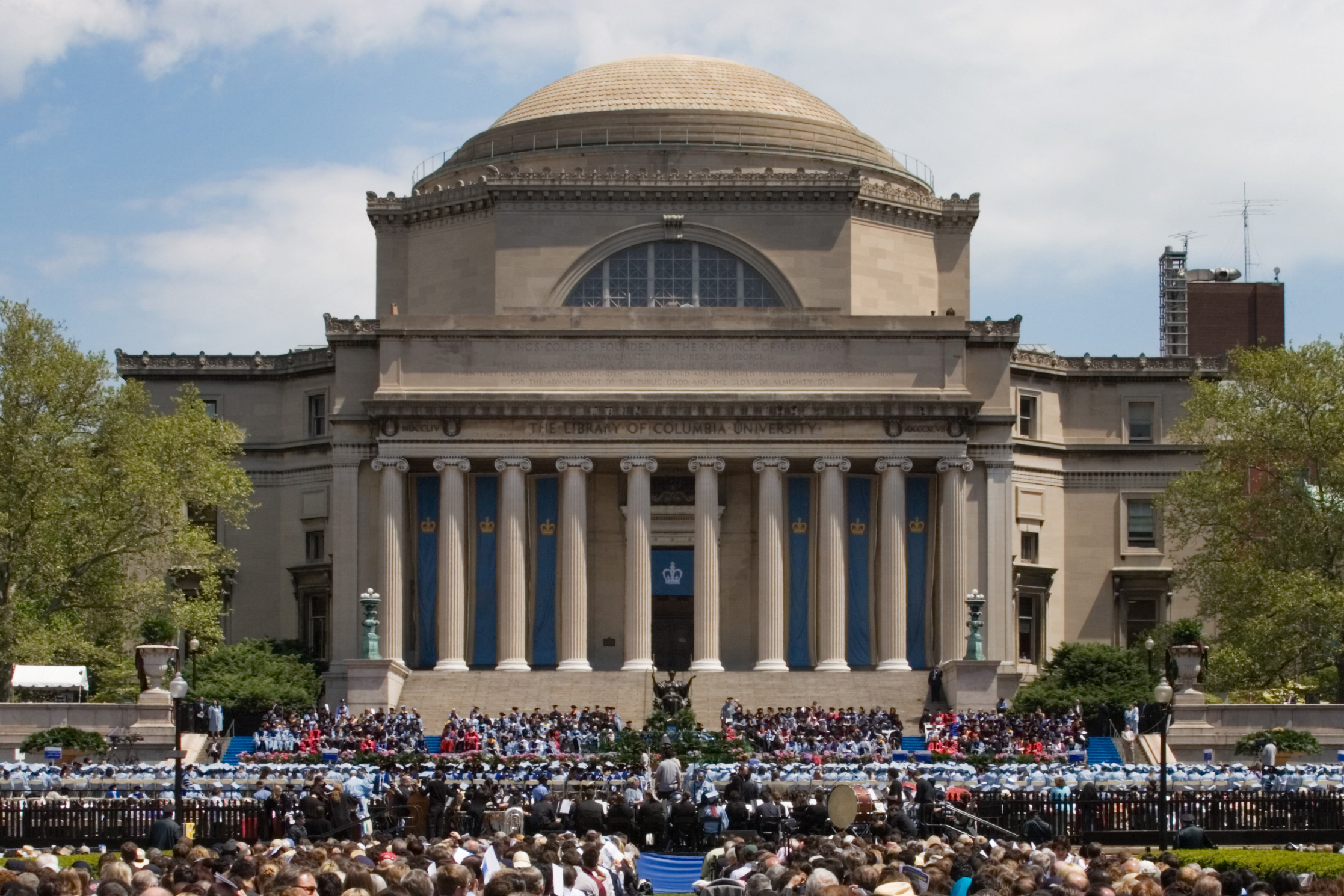
Commencement on the steps of Low Memorial Library, 2005

The first commencement at Columbia University in New York, United States was held on June 21, 1758, when the university, then known as King's College, conferred eight degrees upon its first graduating class. Today, the university graduates several thousand students each year from its several undergraduate colleges, graduate schools, and affiliated institutions. University Commencement traditionally takes place on the third Wednesday of May.

Commencement at Columbia takes place over several days as each school and affiliated institution of the university holds its own Class Day, and culminates in the University Commencement, when degrees are conferred en masse by the university president. Beginning in 2026, graduate and undergraduate degrees were conferred in separate ceremonies.

The tradition of celebrating commencement over several days has been a point of consternation to parents and other attendees: John McCain, whose daughter Meghan McCain graduated from the university in 2007, upon being informed that commencement was a multi-day affair, reportedly asked, "How many fucking times do I have to go to fucking New York this week? How many fucking times can you fucking graduate from fucking Columbia?”

Over several centuries, Columbia has developed a number of traditions around its commencement ceremonies. As a highly important symbolic event, a number of individual commencements have become historically significant, either due to notable guests in attendance or occasionally violent disruptions, such as in 1811, when several students were arrested and the ceremonies were never completed due to rioting. Recent changes, such as the introduction of Multicultural Graduation Celebrations, have garnered significant political controversy.

== History ==
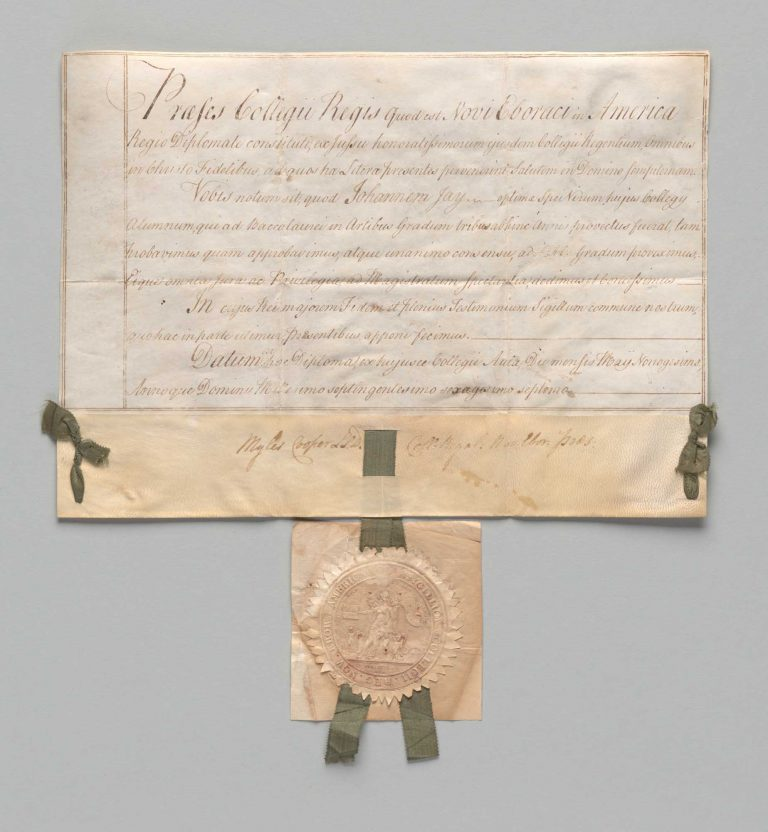
AM diploma awarded to John Jay, 1767

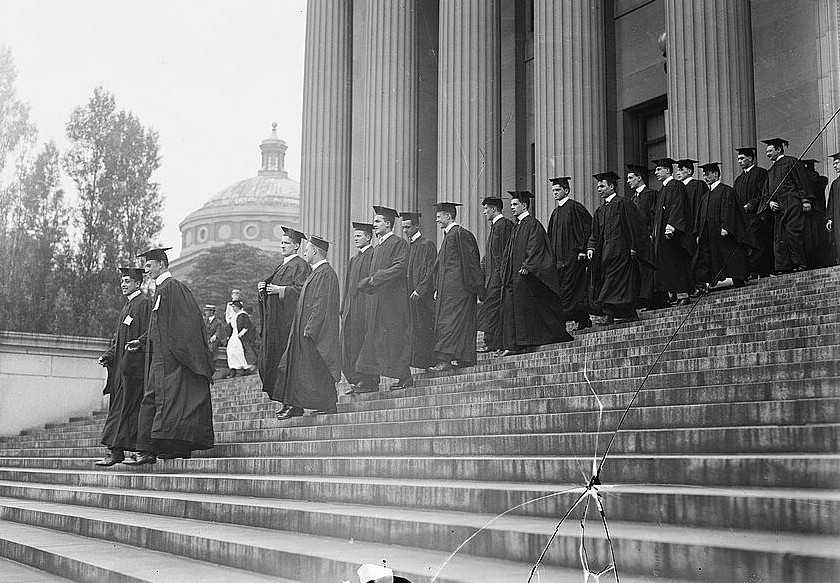
Columbia College students parade down the steps of Low Memorial Library, 1913

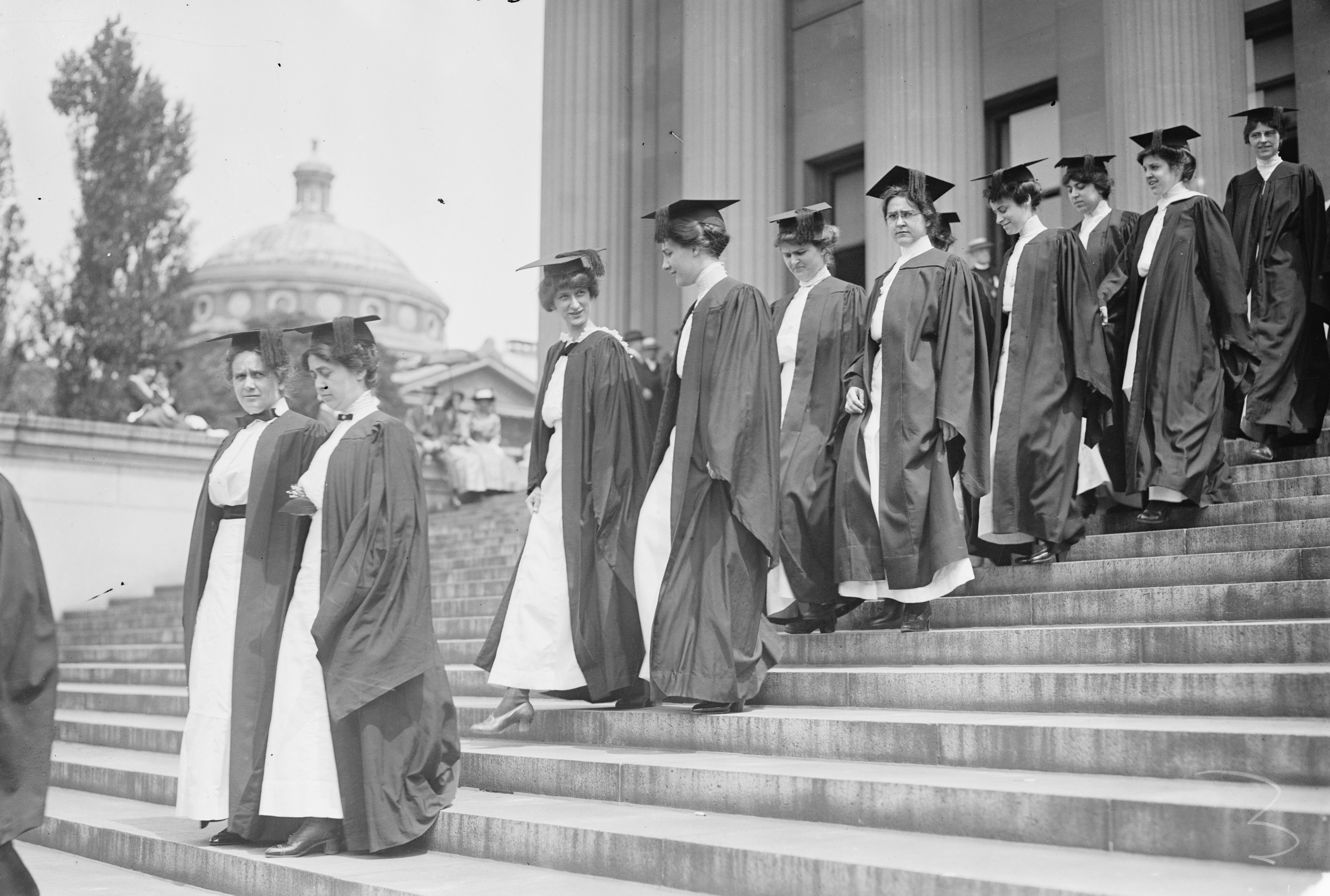
Procession of graduating Barnard College students, 1914

=== Overview ===
According to the New-York Gazette, the university's 1758 commencement was "conducted with much elegance and propriety." It began with an academic procession from the vestry room of the Trinity Church schoolhouse to St. George's Chapel, described as follows: "The President with his Honour the Lieutenant Governor, who graced the solemnity by his presence, were preceded by the candidates for Batchelors [sic] and Masters Degrees, with their heads uncovered, and were followed by the Governors of the College, the Clergy of all denominations in this City, and other gentlemen of distinction of this and the neighboring Provinces." This was followed by a salutatory address delivered by Samuel Provoost, two debates on metaphysics between graduating students, an oration in English, and a debate between honorary degree recipients on heliocentrism. The president of the college, Samuel Johnson, then conferred degrees upon the eight members of the class of 1758 and fourteen honorary degree recipients, before the ceremony was concluded by a valedictory oration.

Physical diplomas were first awarded at commencement in 1763 during the presidency of Myles Cooper.

No commencements were held from 1775 to 1785, on account of the college's closure due to the American Revolution.

From 1785 to 1790, New York City served as the capital of the United States. Prior to 1797, the city also jointly served as the state capital with Kingston. During this period, the college's commencement ceremonies were often frequented by prominent politicians in the area. This includes the commencement of 1786, which the entirety of the Continental Congress and both houses of the New York State Legislature attended, and the commencement of 1789, which saw most of the new United States federal government attend, including George Washington, who had only been sworn in as president a week before, Vice-President John Adams, the Senate and House of Representatives, and members of the Supreme Court, in addition to Governor George Clinton, and other high state officials.^{,}

Before the 19th century, Columbia's graduation ceremonies generally did not take place on campus. For roughly a century following the college's founding, the commencement procession would march each year from College Hall, which was located on Park Place, to Trinity Church or one of its chapels, where the actual ceremony would be held. After the college moved to its Madison Avenue campus in 1857, commencements were usually held at the Academy of Music, the city's first opera house.

Commencement only began to be held on campus following the university's final move to its current campus in Morningside Heights, which took place in 1898. For Columbia's first three decades in Morningside Heights, it held its graduations in the now-demolished University Hall, the university gymnasium. From 1926 until 2025, commencement was held most years on the steps of Low Memorial Library with a few exceptions, including the 1968 ceremony, which was instead held in the Cathedral of St. John the Divine due to the protests that occurred two months earlier, virtual ceremonies in 2020 and 2021 due to the COVID-19 pandemic, and in 2024 when the 2024 Columbia University pro-Palestinian campus occupation led again to the cancellation of a university wide commencement.

=== 1786 ===
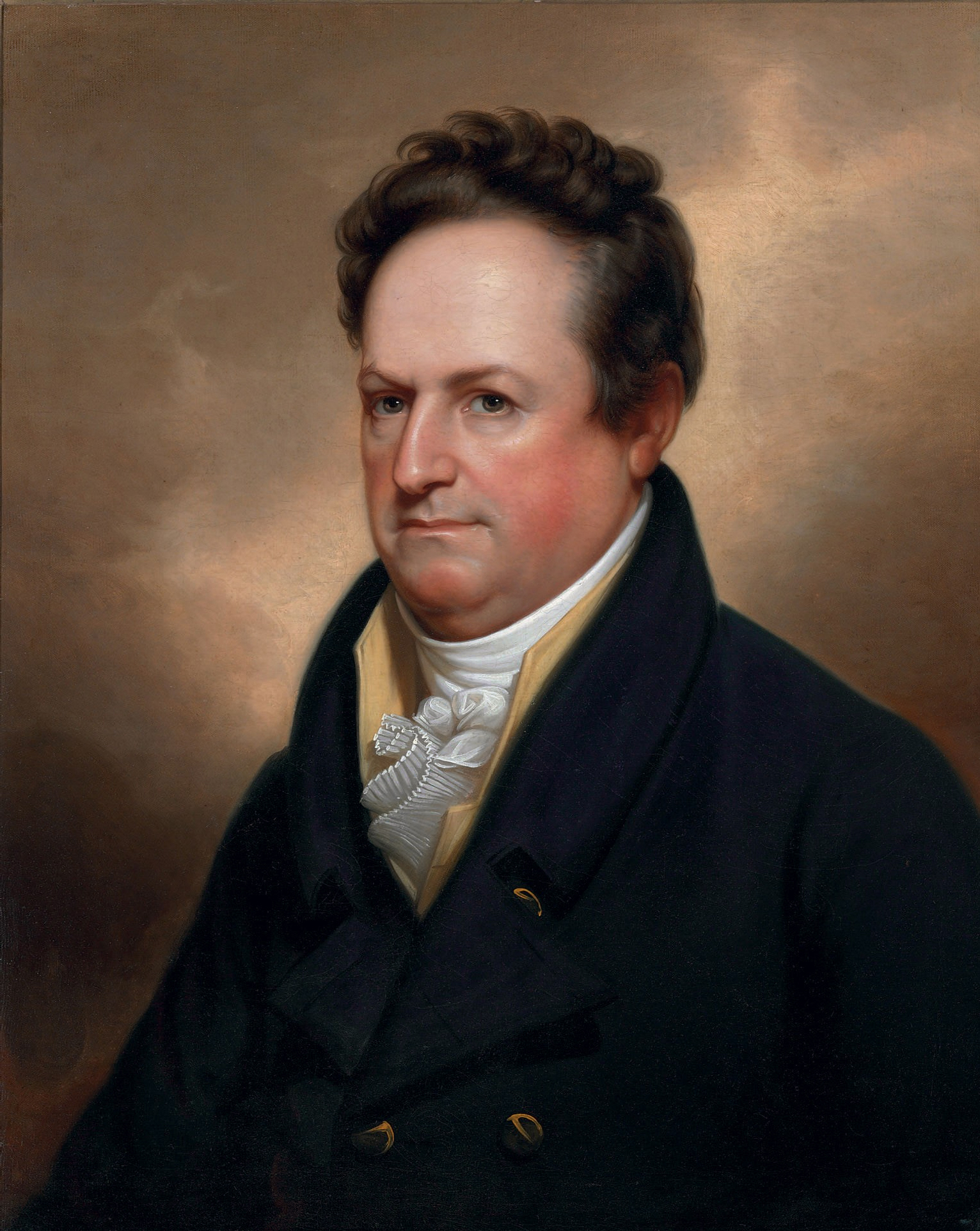
Portrait of DeWitt Clinton by Rembrandt Peale. DeWitt Clinton, a future Governor of New York and presidential candidate was 1786 salutatorian

The 1786 commencement was the university's first commencement after its re-founding as Columbia College following the American Revolution, and was held on April 11 of that year in St. Paul's Chapel. After nearly a decade of suspended operations on account of the war, the event was regarded as "a most auspicious one in the annals of New York." To celebrate the occasion, the entire Continental Congress and both houses of the New York State Legislature suspended operations that day in order to "support the important interests of Education by their countenance, and grace the ceremony by their august presence." DeWitt Clinton, the future governor of New York, gave an address in Latin as that year's salutatorian.

=== The "Riotous Commencement" of 1811 ===
The so-called "Riotous Commencement" of 1811 took place on August 6, 1811, in Trinity Church. Graduating senior John B. Stevenson, having been chosen by his classmates to deliver an oration at the ceremony, intended to use his speech to polemicize on republicanism. Upon review, two faculty members demanded that Stevenson concede in his speech that "many intelligent men thought differently," and, assuming that he agreed, allowed him to speak. After he delivered the oration without the alteration, the faculty refused to grant him his degree, in response to which the audience broke into a riot that lasted for about an hour. President William Harris and the faculty, fearing violent removal, were forced to flee the stage, and neither the valedictory address was given, nor were any Master of Arts candidates awarded their degrees. The riot only ended with the arrival of the police. The next day, seven students, including Stevenson, Gulian Verplanck, and Hugh Maxwell, were charged with inciting to riot. DeWitt Clinton, who was preparing to run for governor, presided over the case, and, wishing to appease his Federalist constituents, determined that a riot had occurred, and fined Verplanck and Maxwell two hundred dollars each, and Stevenson ten. The protest and trial reportedly "engendered bitter feelings that made themselves felt in New York politics for many years."

=== 1968 commencement and counter-commencement ===
Dwight Macdonald addressing students at the 1968 counter-commencement

In a break from tradition, the university's 1968 commencement was held on June 4 in the Cathedral of St. John the Divine, due the ongoing protests. Approximately 400 students and faculty walked out of ceremony and joined another 2,500 students on Low Steps for a counter-commencement. The invocation was delivered by Rabbi A. Bruce Goldman. Later that day, about 1,000 students marched to Morningside Park and burned President Grayson L. Kirk in effigy.

=== 2020 and 2021 virtual ceremonies during COVID-19 ===
Due to the COVID-19 pandemic, both the 2020 and 2021 commencements were held virtually. A combined make-up celebration was held in 2022 for those two classes.

=== 2024 cancellation and counter-graduation ===
In the aftermath of the 2024 Columbia University pro-Palestinian campus occupation, President Minouche Shafik announced on May 6 that the main commencement would not be held, although a student-led convocation ceremony was later planned and held on the same day as commencement would have been held. In addition, a number of faculty and staff at the university organized a "People's Graduation" at the Cathedral of St. John the Divine, open not only to Columbia students, but also graduates of CUNY and NYU.

The smaller school-wide class days and convocations were still held, but those that were planned to take place on South Field were moved from the Morningside campus to Lawrence A. Wien Stadium at Baker Field. President Shafik did not attend any of the school-wide ceremonies.

== Ceremonies ==
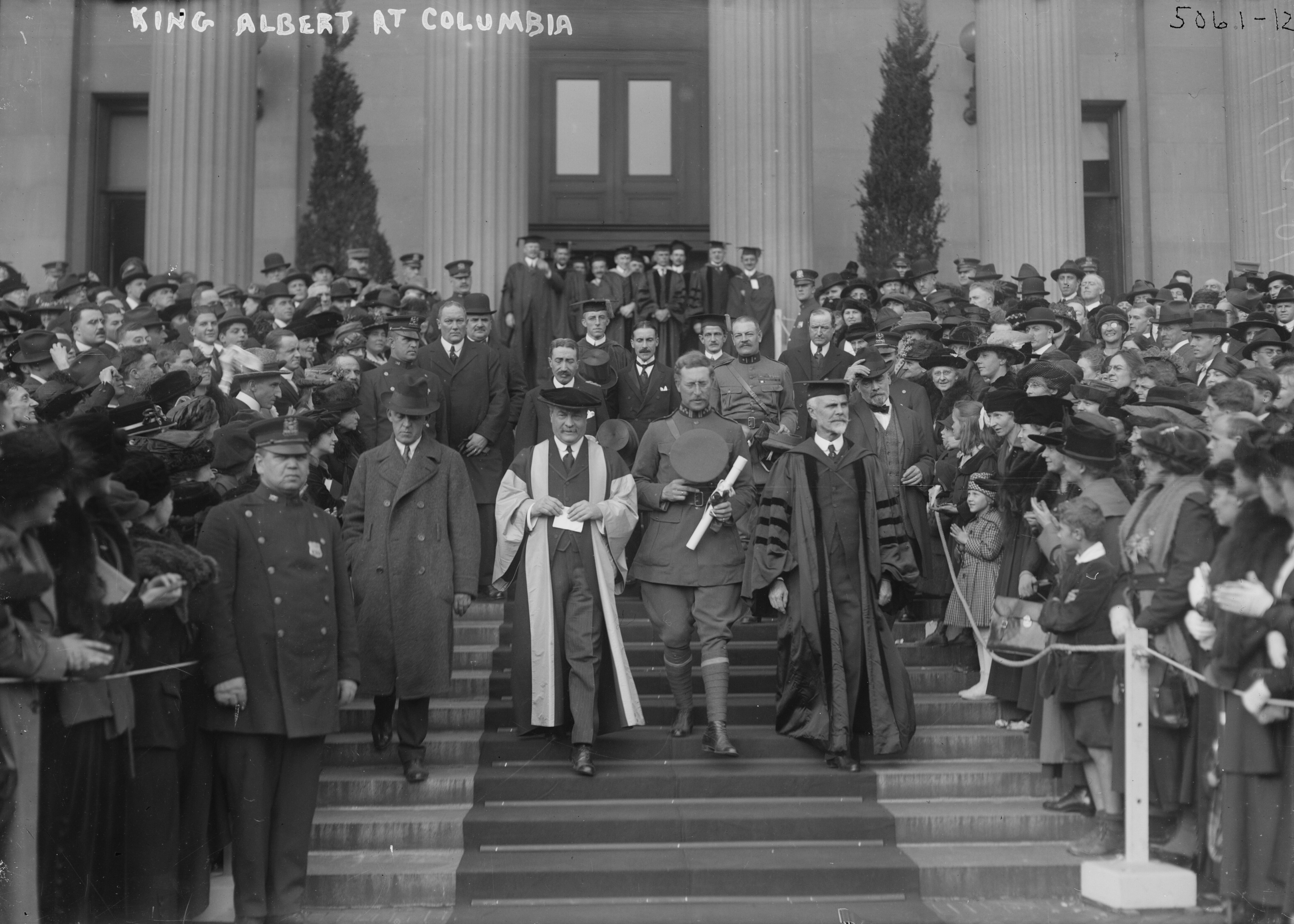
King Albert I of Belgium on the steps of Low Library after receiving an honorary degree, 1919

Commencement begins with the ringing of the St. Paul's Chapel bell, which is followed by the academic procession, and then the commencement address. Breaking with the practice of most universities, which invite distinguished guests to give commencement speeches, the only university-wide commencement address each year is delivered by the president of the university. The hosting of guest speakers is instead reserved for the Class Days of individual schools.

Columbia degrees are awarded en masse during University Commencement, as only the president of the university has the actual authority to grant degrees. During University Commencement, each of the university's deans steps forward to beg the president to confer degrees upon their school's candidates; no candidate technically graduates until the entire ceremony is over. During the conferral of degrees, students of each school by tradition wave or throw items representative of their studies: for Columbia College, apple cores (which have reportedly been used to pelt engineering students on occasion); the Graduate School of Journalism, shredded newspapers; the School of International and Public Affairs, the students' national flags; etc. In addition to degrees, the university awards numerous medals, awards, and honorary degrees during the ceremony. Formerly, the Pulitzer Prize was awarded also during University Commencement.

Following the conferral of awards and degrees, the ceremony concludes with the singing of the university alma mater, "Stand, Columbia," among other songs, and the distribution of diplomas.

=== University Mace ===
The University Mace is carried by a mace-bearer before the president on ceremonial occasions, including the academic procession at commencement, and symbolizes the latter's authority to confer degrees. The Jacobean-style mace was created in the 18th century. Its head is made of Sheffield plate, with a design of acanthus leaves and topped with a King's Crown, and its handle is of ebony and silver. It was gifted to the university in 1933 by John M. Woolsey. A mace-bearer is selected every year as an honor, and wears a unique red and white robe in lieu of their regular academic regalia.

=== Academic Regalia ===
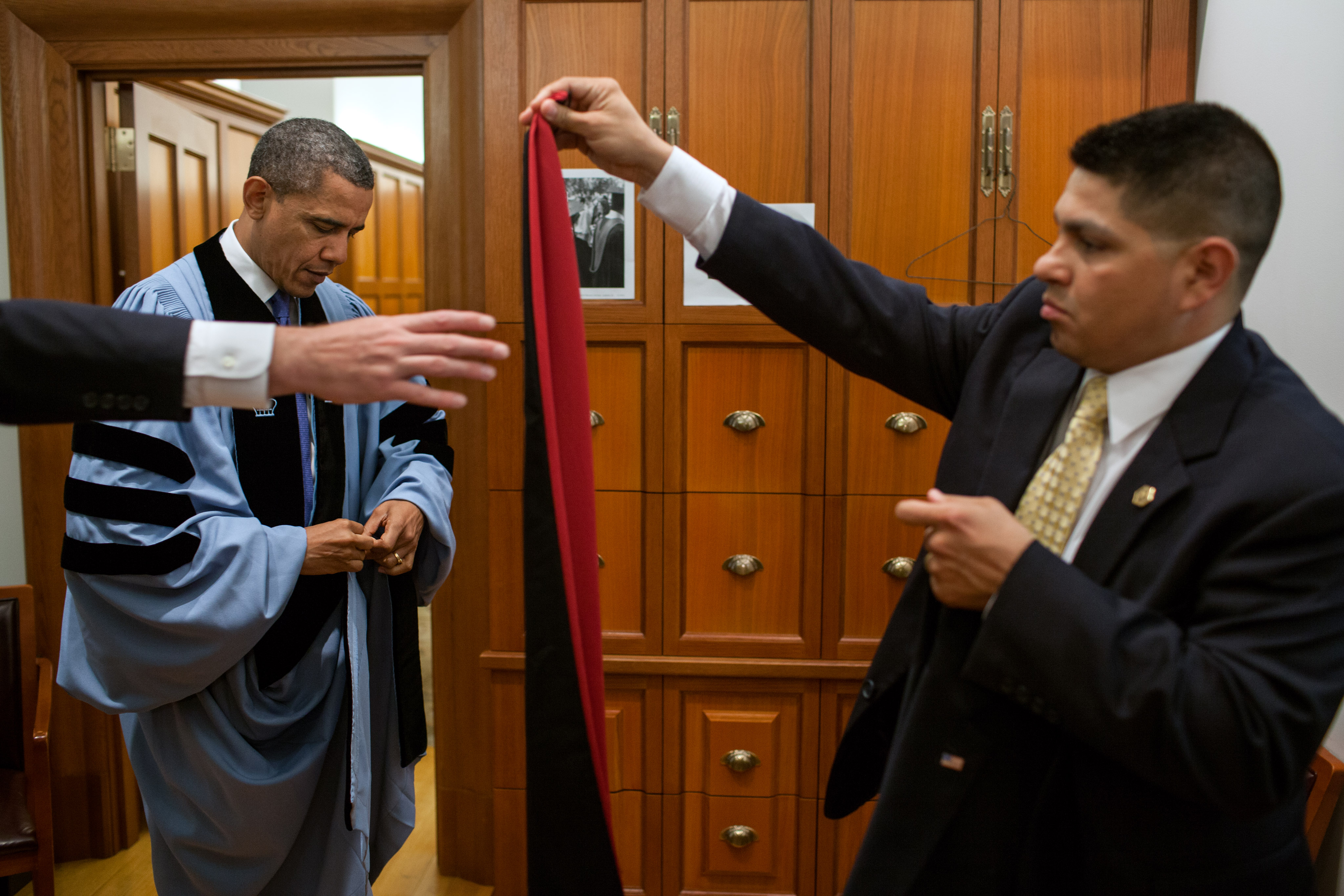
Barack Obama dons his academic regalia before delivering the 2012 Barnard College Class Day address

Graduating students are required to wear the academic regalia of the university to all graduation events. Faculty, likewise, must wear the regalia of their respective almae matres in accordance with the level of the degree earned at that institution. Academic dress was first introduced at the university's second commencement in 1760, and from the accession of President Myles Cooper in 1763 until the mid-19th century, students were required to wear it at all times. Columbia's academic regalia served as the basis for the standard set out in the Intercollegiate Code of Academic Costume, passed March 16, 1895, to which a vast majority of universities in the United States still adheres.

Columbia Bachelor's and Master's gowns are slate blue, with two black tabs sewn into the yolk seam on either side of the gown with crowns embroidered onto them. Master's gowns are differentiated from Bachelor's gowns by their oblong sleeves, which open at the wrists. Doctoral gowns have facings of black velvet, with three black velvet chevrons on each sleeve; their crowns are embroidered directly onto the facing. The velvet chevrons were formerly colored to indicate the wearer's degree. Bachelor's and master's candidates wear traditional mortar-boards, while doctoral candidates wear octagonal black velvet tams with gold tassels.

=== Recent traditions ===
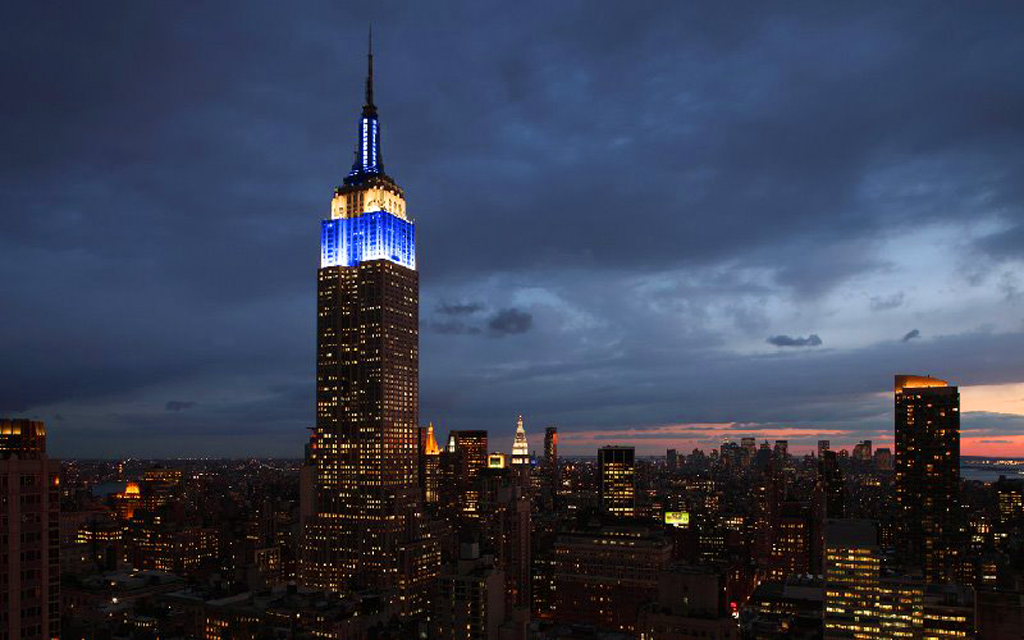
The Empire State Building, lit blue and white to celebrate commencement, 2012

Since 2009, the Empire State Building has been lit blue and white annually to celebrate commencement at Columbia.

Recently, Columbia began offering six separate and additional ceremonies for Native, Asian, Latino, Black, LGBTQ, and first-generation and low-income students. According to the university, these ceremonies are open to any students who wish to participate. This practice has garnered controversy from conservative groups, which have accused the university of "segregation."

== See also ==
- Academic regalia of Columbia University
- History of Columbia University
- History and traditions of Harvard commencements
