= History of Columbia University =

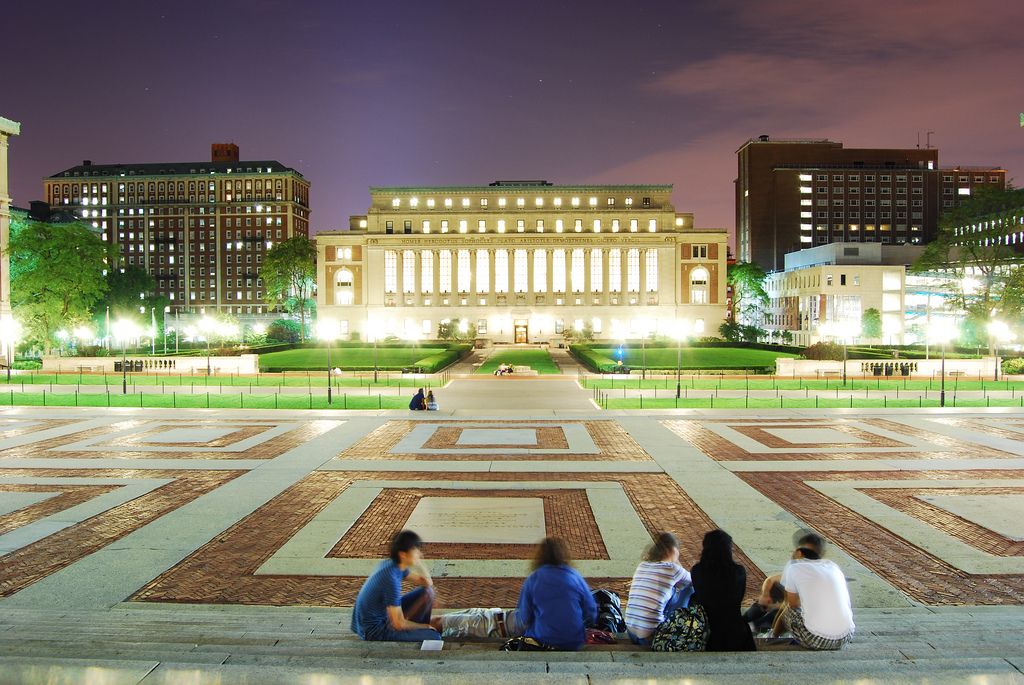
Columbia University, a private Ivy League university in Manhattan, New York City, founded in 1754, prior to the American Revolution

Columbia University was founded in 1754 in New York City as King's College, by royal charter of King George II of Great Britain. It is the oldest institution of higher learning in New York state, and the fifth-oldest in the United States.

== Founding of King's College ==
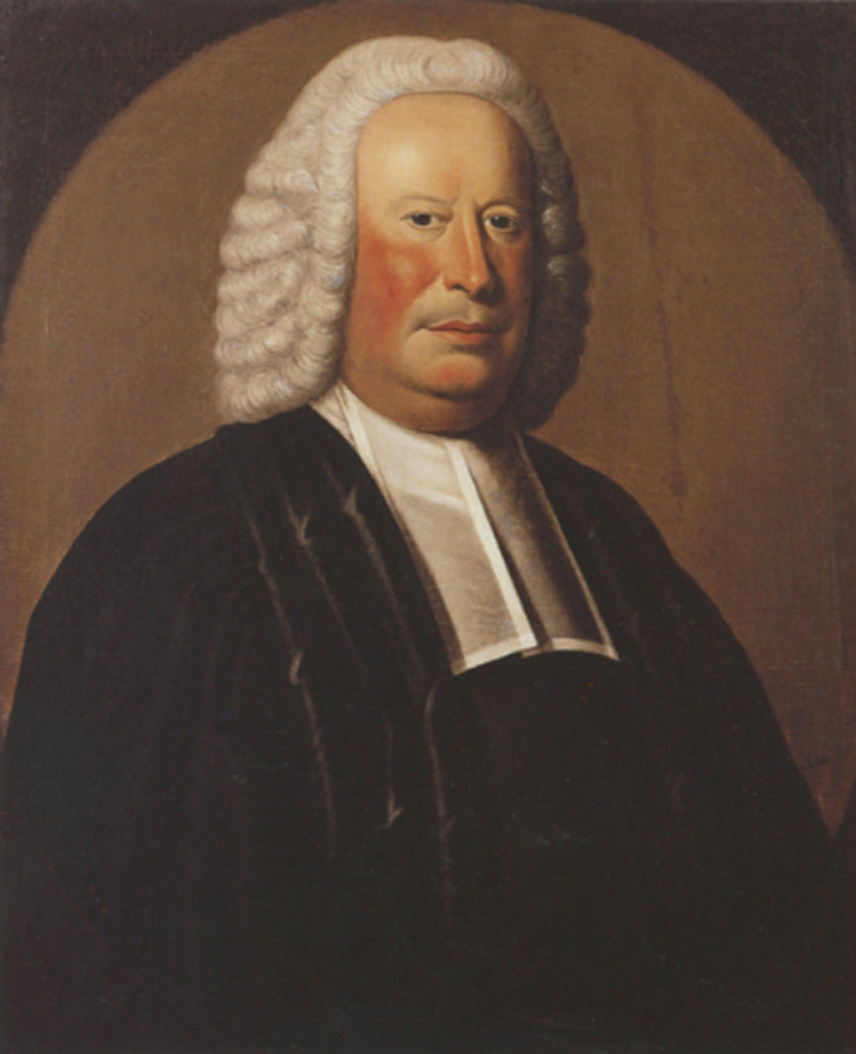
The Rev. Dr. Samuel Johnson, first president of King's College

The period leading up to the school's founding was marked by controversy, with various groups competing to determine its location and religious affiliation. Advocates of New York City met with success on the first point, while the Church of England prevailed on the latter. However, all constituencies agreed to commit themselves to principles of religious liberty in establishing the policies of the College.

Although Dutch New Amsterdam and the entire island of Manhattan had officially been ceded to the Kingdom of Great Britain in February 1674 with the Treaty of Westminster, no serious discussions as to the founding of a university in the renamed Province of New York began until the early eighteenth-century. This delay is often attributed to the multitude of languages and religions practiced in the province, which made the founding of a seat of learning difficult because Colleges during the colonial period were regarded as a religious, no less a scientific and literary institution. Agreements stipulated in the Anglo-Dutch Westminster Treaty on how the transition to British rule would be enacted also contributed to the impasse. The Articles of Capitulation guaranteed certain rights to Dutch colonists; among these were: liberty of conscience in divine worship and church discipline, the continuation of their own customs concerning inheritances, and the application of Dutch law (not English Common Law) to contracts made prior to 1674.

The delay between the founding of the Province of New York and the opening of its first college stands in contrast to institutions such as Harvard University, which was created only six years after the founding of Boston, Massachusetts, a colony with a more homogenous Puritan population. Discussions regarding the founding of a college in the Province of New York began as early as 1704, when Colonel Lewis Morris wrote to the Society for the Propagation of the Gospel in Foreign Parts, the missionary arm of the Church of England, persuading the society that New York City was an ideal community in which to establish a college. In 1686 Governor of New York Thomas Dongan, 2nd Earl of Limerick unsuccessfully petitioned James II of England for a grant of the Duke's, known as King's Farm, to maintain his Jesuit College, which eventually failed. Morris had initially designed the college to be built upon this land, which was vested to Trinity Church by Queen Anne and Lord Cornburry in 1705, and nothing came of the proposition to form a college in the province until almost fifty years later. The founding of Harvard in 1636 and Yale in 1701 had set no competitive juices flowing among New York's merchants. But the announcement in the summer of 1745 that New Jersey, which had only seven years before secured a government separate from New York's and was still considered by New Yorkers to be within its cultural catch basin, was about to found the College of New Jersey, now Princeton University, demanded an immediate response.

In 1746 an act was passed by the general assembly of New York to raise a sum of £2,250 by public lottery for the foundation of a new college, despite the fact that the University had neither a founding denomination nor a location for its first campus. In 1751, the assembly appointed a commission of ten New York residents, seven of whom were Church of England members, to direct the funds accrued by the state lottery towards the foundation of a college. Funds were also provided by many of the wealthiest individuals of the period, including numerous slave owners and slave traders. In March of the following year, the vestrymen of Trinity Church offered the commission the six-northernmost acres of its property for the foundation of the college, which settled the problem of the college's first campus; however, considerable outcry from William Livingston and other members of the commission who believed that the college should be nonsectarian caused further delay in the college's founding. Despite Livingston's objections, the commission voted to accept the lands from Trinity Church on the condition that the college's affiliation be Church of England. The commission chose as the college's first president Dr. Samuel Johnson, a preeminent scholar who had received his doctorate from The University of Oxford, and had been sought in similar capacity to preside over the College of Philadelphia, now The University of Pennsylvania.

== King's College (1754–1784) ==
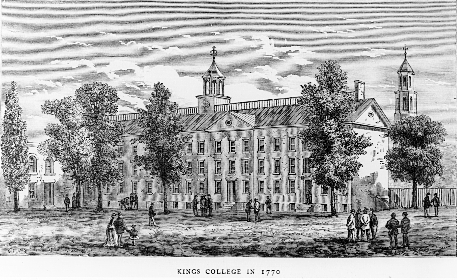
King's College Hall in 1770

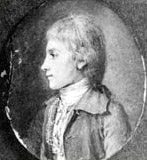
Alexander Hamilton, an early alumnus of King's College.

Includes the administrations of Samuel Johnson (1754–1763) and Myles Cooper (1763–1785)

Classes were initially held in July 1754, the delay stemming from the inability of the college to secure adequate faculty. Dr. Johnson was the only instructor of the college's first class, which consisted of a mere eight students. Instruction was held in a new schoolhouse adjoining Trinity Church, located on what is now lower Broadway in Manhattan. The college was officially founded on October 31, 1754, as King's College by royal charter of King George II, making it the oldest institution of higher learning in the state of New York and the fifth oldest in the United States. On June 3 of the following year, the Governors of the College adopted a design prepared by Dr. Johnson for the seal of King's College, which continues to be that of Columbia College with the alteration in name. In 1760, King's College moved to its own building on a site which was bounded by Church Street, Barclay Street and Park Place; just west of the present City Hall. In 1767 it established the first American medical school becoming the American institution to grant a degree of Doctor of Medicine.

Controversy surrounded the founding of the new college in New York, as it was a thoroughly Church of England institution dominated by the influence of Crown officials in its governing body, such as the Archbishop of Canterbury and the Secretary of State for the Colonies. Fears of the establishment of a Church of England episcopacy and of Crown influence in America through King's College were underpinned by its vast wealth, far surpassing all other colonial colleges of the period.

In 1763, Johnson was succeeded in the presidency by Myles Cooper, a graduate of The Queen's College, Oxford, and an ardent Tory. In the political controversies which preceded the American Revolution, his chief opponent in discussions at the College was an undergraduate of the class of 1777, Alexander Hamilton. On one occasion, a mob came to the College, bent on doing violence to the president, but Hamilton held their attention with a speech, giving Cooper enough time to escape. The next year the Revolutionary War broke out and the College was turned into a military hospital and barracks.

The American Revolution and the subsequent war were catastrophic for the operation of King's College. It suspended instruction for eight years beginning in 1776 with the arrival of the Continental Army in the spring of that year. The suspension continued through the military occupation of New York City by British troops until their departure in 1783. The college's library was looted and its sole building requisitioned for use as a military hospital first by American and then British forces. Although the college had been considered a bastion of Tory sentiment, it nevertheless produced many key leaders of the Revolutionary generation, individuals later instrumental in the college's revival. Among the earliest students and trustees of King's College were five "founding fathers" of the United States: John Jay, who negotiated the Treaty of Paris between the United States and the Kingdom of Great Britain, ending the Revolutionary War, and who later became the first Chief Justice of the United States; Alexander Hamilton, military aide to General George Washington, author of most of the Federalist Papers, and the first Secretary of the Treasury; Gouverneur Morris, the author of the final draft of the United States Constitution; Robert R. Livingston, a member of the Committee of Five, that drafted the Declaration of Independence; and Egbert Benson who represented New York in the Continental Congress and the Annapolis Convention, and who was a ratifier of the United States Constitution.

== Post-Revolutionary War (1784–1800) ==
=== Columbia College under the Regents (1784–1787) ===
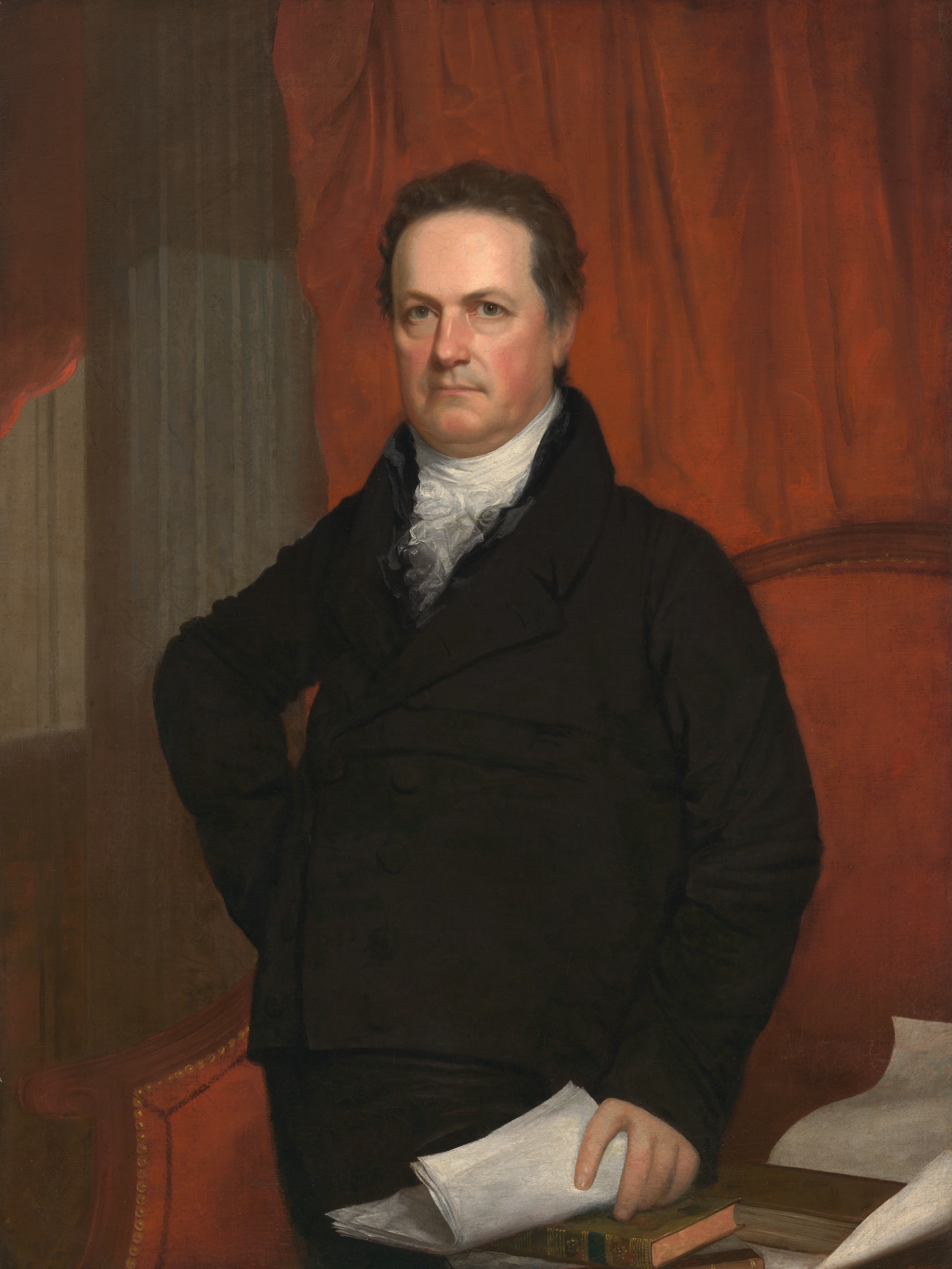
DeWitt Clinton, one of the first students enrolled in Columbia College

King's College had been in a state of abeyance for eight years by the time the war ended, with many of the members of the college's Board of Governors either absent or killed during the American Revolutionary War. The college turned to the State of New York in order to restore its vitality, promising to make whatever changes to the schools charter the state might demand. The Legislature agreed to assist the college, and on May 1, 1784, it passed "an Act for granting certain privileges to the College heretofore called King's College." The Act created a Board of Regents to oversee the resuscitation of King's, giving them the power to hire a college president and appoint professors, but prohibiting the College from administering any "religious test-oath" to its faculty. Finally, in an effort to demonstrate its support for the new Republic, the Legislature stipulated that "the College within the City of New York heretofore called King's College be forever hereafter called and known by the name of Columbia College."

On May 5, 1784, the Regents held their first meeting, instructing Treasurer Brockholst Livingston and Secretary Robert Harpur (who was Professor of Mathematics and Natural Philosophy at King's) to recover the books, records and any other assets that had been dispersed during the war, and appointing a committee to supervise the repairs of the college building. In addition, the Regents moved quickly to rebuild Columbia's faculty, appointing William Cochran instructor of Greek and Latin. In the summer of 1784, after the legislature passed the act restoring the college, Major General James Clinton, a hero of the revolutionary war, brought his son DeWitt Clinton to New York on his way to enroll him as a student at the College of New Jersey. When James Duane, the Mayor of New York and a member of the Regents, heard that the younger Clinton was leaving the state for his education, he pleaded with Cochran to offer him admission to the reconstituted Columbia. Cochran agreed – partly because DeWitt's uncle, George Clinton, the Governor of New York, had recently been elected Chancellor of the College by the Regents – and DeWitt Clinton became one of nine students admitted to Columbia in the year 1784.

During the period under the Regents, many efforts were made to put the University on respectable footing, resolving to organize the college into the four faculties of Arts, Divinity, Medicine, and Law. A number of different professorships were created within each faculty, while the college remained under the supervision of the Regents. The staff of the entire university – which included numerous aforementioned professors, a president, a secretary, and a librarian – operated under the yearly budget of £1,200. During this period no president was able to be appointed due to the college's inadequate funds, which rendered it unable to offer a salary as would induce a suitable person to accept the office. Instead, the duties of the president's office were held by the schools various professors, which led to discord between the school's faculty members. The Regents finally became aware of the college's defective constitution in February 1787 and appointed a revision committee, which was headed by John Jay and Alexander Hamilton. In April of that same year, a new charter was adopted for the college, still in use today, granting power to a private board of twenty-four Trustees.

=== Columbia College as independent entity ===
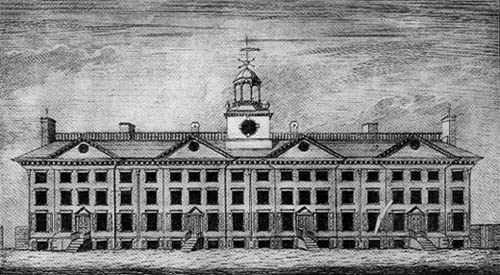
College Hall in 1790

On May 21, 1787, William Samuel Johnson, the son of Dr. Samuel Johnson, was unanimously elected President of Columbia College. Prior to serving at the University, Johnson had participated in the First Continental Congress and been chosen as a delegate to the Constitutional Convention. For a period in the 1790s, with New York City as the federal and state capital and the country under successive Federalist governments, a revived Columbia thrived under the auspices of Federalists such as Hamilton and Jay. Both President George Washington and Vice President John Adams attended the College's commencement on May 6, 1789, as a tribute of honor to the many alumni of the school that had been instrumental in bringing about the independence of the fledgling United States of America.

During the period of Johnson's presidency, the College's campus began to expand, and in 1792 a new library extension was built to accommodate the College's growing library with the help of a grant from the Legislature of New York State. In December 1793, the Professorship of Law was filled by the election of James Kent, who gave the first instruction of law at any American University and was a forerunner to the University's Law School. On July 16, 1800, the seventy-four-year-old Dr. Johnson resigned his presidency of the College. In 1801, the Board of Trustees appointed Charles Henry Wharton as Dr. Johnson's successor. Wharton was to assume the office of president at the August commencement ceremonies, but he did not appear for them, and resigned in the fall.

== College stagnation (1800–1857) ==
Despite the College's liberal acceptance of various religious and ethnic groups, during the period from 1785–1849 the institutional life of the college was a continuous struggle for existence, owing to inadequate means and lack of financial support.

The curriculum of the college during the beginning of the 19th century was mostly focused on study of the classics. As a result, the major prerequisite for admission into the College was familiarity with Greek and Latin and a basic understanding of mathematics. In 1810, following the advice of a committee put together by members of the school, the College greatly tightened its admission standards; nonetheless, admission of qualified students increased, with 135 students matriculating in 1810. In the preceding decade, the average size of the graduating class had been seventeen.

Because the school had no athletic program, student life during this period was mainly focused around literary groups such as the Philolexian Society, which was founded in 1802. In 1811, the College's new president William Harris presided over what became known as the ""Riotous Commencement" in which students violently protested the faculty's decision not to confer a degree upon John Stevenson, who had inserted objectionable words into his commencement speech.

The main building which housed the College was decayed and unsightly in appearance; however, the funds of the College were augmented somewhat by the growing importance of its investments in real estate, although the true value of some of these acquisitions would not come to light until over a century later. For example, in 1814 the New York Legislature responded to the College's appeal for financial assistance by giving the school the Elgin Botanic Garden, a twenty-acre tract of land that had been privately developed as the nation's first botanical garden by physician David Hosack, but which Hosack had closed and resold to the state at a loss. The site, which had been 3 1/2 miles (5.6 km) outside of the city limits in 1801, was leased by Columbia to John D. Rockefeller Jr. in the 1920s for the construction of Rockefeller Center. It was still owned by Columbia until 1985, when it was sold for $400 million.

In November 1813, the College agreed to combine its medical school with The College of Physicians and Surgeons, a new school created by the Regents of New York, forming Columbia University College of Physicians and Surgeons. During the 1820s, the College renovated its campus and continued to seek grants from the state while it slowly expanded the scope of its academic catalog, adding Italian courses in 1825.

The College's enrollment, structure, and academics stagnated for the remaining forty years, with many of the college presidents doing little to change the way that the College functioned. Adding to the woes of the College during this period, in 1831 the school began to face direct competition in the form of the University of the City of New York, which was later to become New York University. This new university had a more utilitarian curriculum, which stood in contrast to Columbia's focus on ancient literature. As a demonstration of NYU's popularity, by the second year of its operation it had 158 students, whereas Columbia College, eighty years after its founding, only had 120. Trustees of Columbia attempted to block the founding of NYU, issuing pamphlets to dissuade the Legislature from opening another university while Columbia continued to struggle financially. By July, 1854 the Christian Examiner of Boston, in an article entitled "The Recent Difficulties at Columbia College", noted that the school was "good in classics" yet "weak in sciences", and had "very few distinguished graduates".

When Charles King became Columbia's president in November 1849, the College was in large amounts of debt, having exceeded their annual expenditure by about $2200 for the past fifteen years. On his formal inauguration, King spoke on the duties and responsibilities of the university staff, and espoused the virtues of copying the English university system. By this time, the College's investments in New York real estate, particularly the Botanical Garden, became a primary source of steady income for the school, mainly owing to the city's rapidly increasing population.

== Expansion and Madison Avenue campus (1857–1896) ==
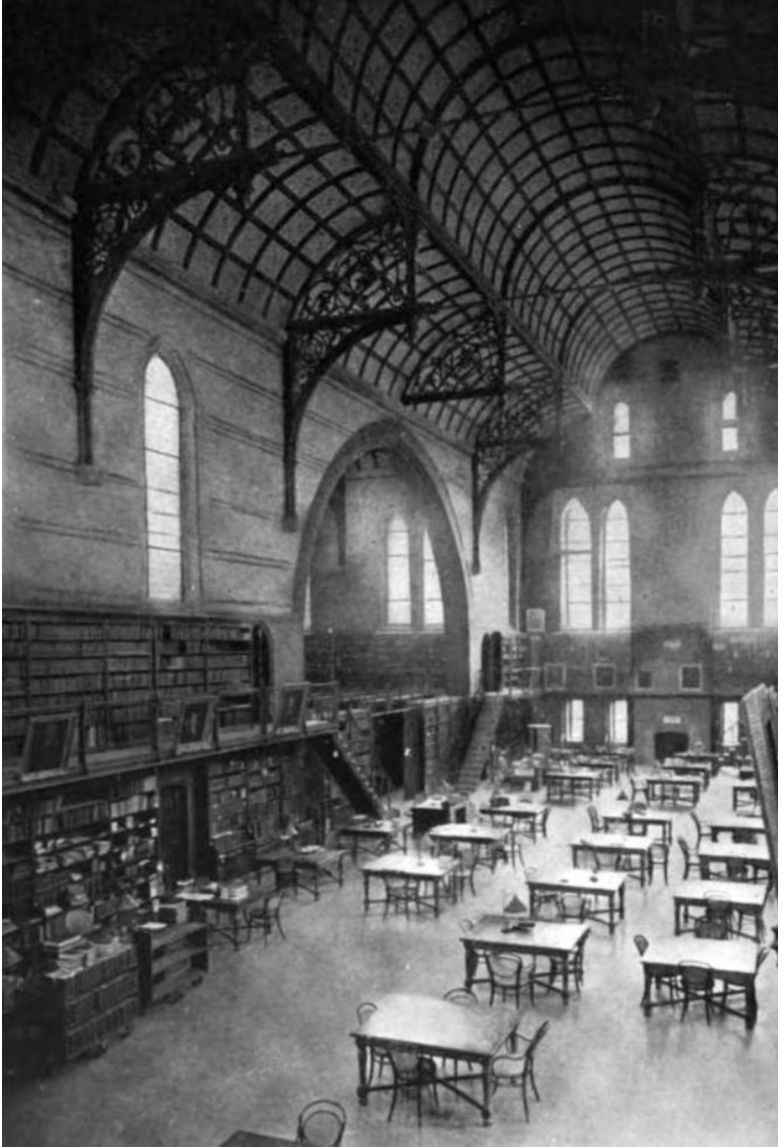
Interior of the library at Columbia College's Madison Avenue campus

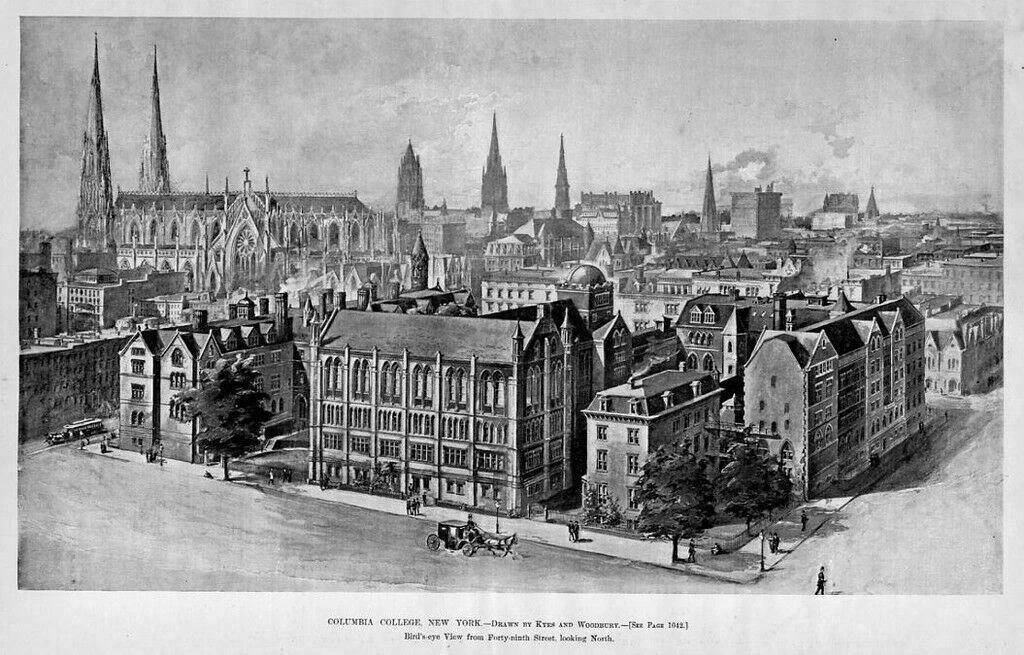
Bird's eye view of Columbia College in 1894, from 49th St facing north, drawn by Kyes & Woodbury.

In 1857, the College moved from Park Place to a primarily Gothic Revival campus on 49th Street and Madison Avenue, at the former site of the New York Institute for the Instruction of the Deaf and Dumb, where it remained for the next forty years. It was "a one-square block campus: from 49th to 50th Street and from Madison Avenue to Fourth (now Park)." The College operated in the former Institute until growth forced it to erect additional buildings. Nothing is left of the College at that location, though some artifacts have been preserved.

While the new location was described as a "delightful one" with "a beautiful lawn slope from the college down to 49th street" it also was in a part of the city very much still under construction. Most unfortunately, "the ends of rows of coffins filled with the bones of the unknown dead, are still to be seen protruding from the bank of earth left by the cutting through of the 4th Avenue" along the east side of campus.

The transition to the new campus coincided with a new outlook for the college; during the 1857 commencement, College President Charles King proclaimed Columbia "a university". During the last half of the nineteenth century, under the leadership of President F.A.P. Barnard, the institution rapidly assumed the shape of a true modern university. Columbia Law School was founded in 1858, and in 1864 the School of Mines, the country's first such institution and the precursor to today's Fu Foundation School of Engineering and Applied Science, was established. The Graduate Faculties in Political Science, Philosophy, and Pure Science awarded its first PhD in 1875. Barnard College for women was established by the eponymous Columbia president in 1889; the Columbia University College of Physicians and Surgeons came under the aegis of the University in 1891, followed by Teachers College, Columbia University in 1893.

Among the new buildings constructed in this location, were Hamilton Hall (1879) as well as buildings for the School of Mines (1880-1884) and a combined building for the Library and the Law School.

This period also witnessed the inauguration of Columbia's participation in intercollegiate sports, with the creation of the baseball team in 1867, the organization of the football team in 1870, and the creation of a crew team by 1873. The first intercollegiate Columbia football game was a 6–3 loss to Rutgers. The Columbia Daily Spectator began publication during this period as well, in 1877.

In 1886, William Archibald Dunning, historian of the Reconstruction era for whom the Dunning School of historiography is named, started teaching at Columbia. Although his ideas were influential in the early 20th century, his interpretations and conclusions have been described as racist and white supremacist, with later Columbia historian Eric Foner writing that they "offered scholarly legitimacy to the disenfranchisement of southern blacks and to the Jim Crow system."

== Morningside Heights (1896–present) ==
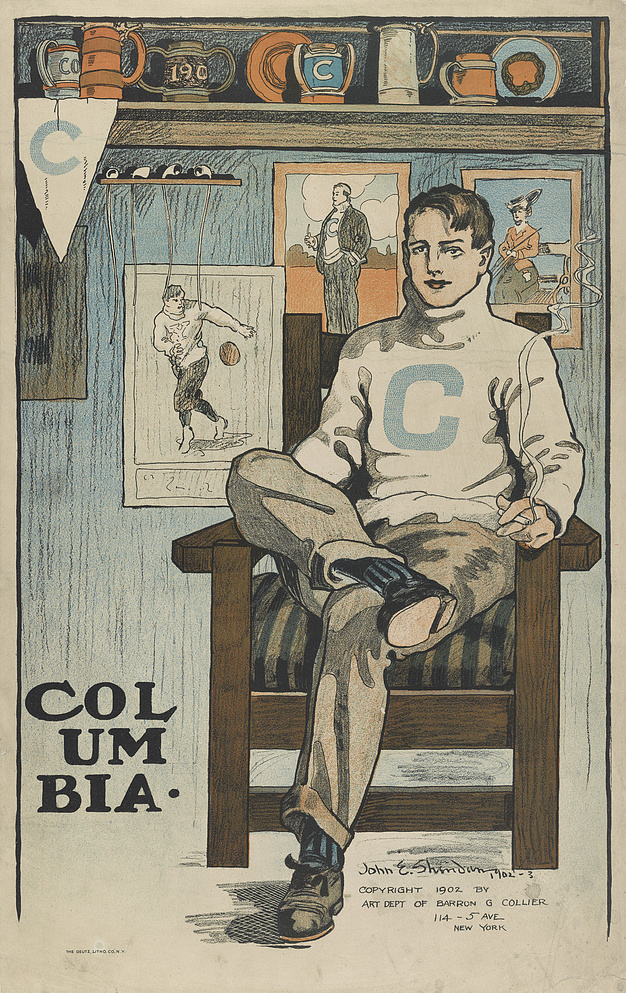
A Columbia University student in a 1902 poster

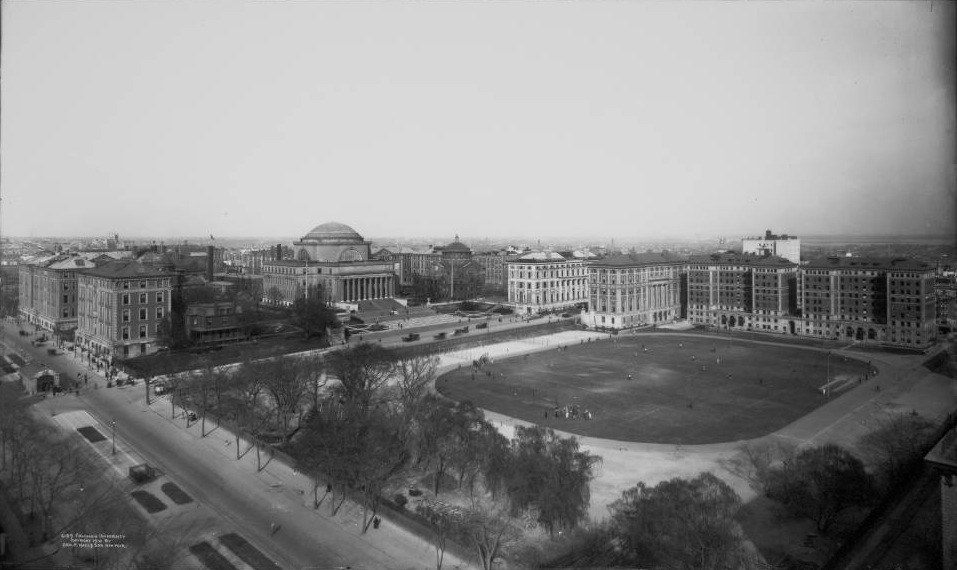
Columbia University in 1910

In 1896, the trustees officially authorized the use of yet another new name, Columbia University, and today the institution is officially known as "Columbia University in the City of New York." Additionally, the engineering school was renamed the "School of Mines, Engineering and Chemistry." At the same time, university president Seth Low moved the campus again, from 49th Street to its present location, a more spacious (and, at the time, more rural) campus in the developing neighborhood of Morningside Heights. The site was formerly occupied by the Bloomingdale Insane Asylum. One of the asylum's buildings, the warden's cottage (later known as East Hall and Buell Hall), still stands today.

The building often depicted as emblematic of Columbia is the centerpiece of the Morningside Heights campus, Low Memorial Library. Constructed in 1895, the building is still referred to as "Low Library" although it has not functioned as a library since 1934. It currently houses the offices of the President, Provost, the Visitor Center, and the Trustees' Room and Columbia Security. Patterned loosely on the Classical Pantheon, it is surmounted by the largest all-granite dome in the United States.

Under the leadership of Low's successor, Nicholas Murray Butler, Columbia rapidly became the nation's major institution for research, setting the "multiversity" model that later universities would adopt. On the Morningside Heights campus, Columbia centralized on a single campus the College, the School of Law, the Graduate Faculties, the School of Mines (predecessor of the Engineering School), and the College of Physicians & Surgeons. Butler went on to serve as president of Columbia for over four decades and became a giant in American public life (as one-time vice presidential candidate and a Nobel Laureate). His introduction of "downtown" business practices in university administration led to innovations in internal reforms such as the centralization of academic affairs, the direct appointment of registrars, deans, provosts, and secretaries, as well as the formation of a professionalized university bureaucracy, unprecedented among American universities at the time.

In 1893, the Columbia University Press was founded to "promote the study of economic, historical, literary, scientific and other subjects; and to promote and encourage the publication of literary works embodying original research in such subjects." Among its publications are The Columbia Encyclopedia, first published in 1935, and The Columbia Lippincott Gazetteer of the World, first published in 1952. In 1902, New York newspaper magnate Joseph Pulitzer donated a substantial sum to the University for the founding of a school to teach journalism. The result was the 1912 opening of the Graduate School of Journalism—the only journalism school in the Ivy League. Columbia does not, however, offer an undergraduate degree in journalism. The school is the administrator of the Pulitzer Prize and the duPont-Columbia Award in broadcast journalism.

Franz Boas, pioneer of modern anthropology associated with historical particularism and cultural relativism and opponent of scientific racism, became a professor at Columbia in 1899. He organized various professors into a new anthropology department in 1902, one that would make critical interventions in response to US foreign policy and affirmed the notion of a scholar-activist.

In 1904, Columbia organized adult education classes into a formal program called Extension Teaching (later renamed University Extension). Courses in Extension Teaching eventually give rise to the Columbia Writing Program, the Columbia Business School, and the School of Dentistry.

In 1928, Seth Low Junior College was established by Columbia University in order to mitigate the number of Jewish applicants to Columbia College. The college was closed in 1938 due to the adverse effects of the Great Depression and its students were subsequently taught at Morningside Heights, although they did not belong to any college but to the university at large.

There was an evening school called University Extension, which taught night classes, for a fee, to anyone willing to attend. In 1947, the program was reorganized as an undergraduate college and designated the School of General Studies in response to the return of GIs after World War II. In 1995, the School of General Studies was again reorganized as a full-fledged liberal arts college for non-traditional students (those who have had an academic break of one year or more) and was fully integrated into Columbia's traditional undergraduate curriculum. Within the same year, the Division of Special Programs—later the School of Continuing Education, and now the School of Professional Studies—was established to reprise the former role of University Extension. While the School of Professional Studies only offered non-degree programs for lifelong learners and high school students in its earliest stages, it now offers degree programs in a diverse range of professional and inter-disciplinary fields.

By the late 1930s, a Columbia student could study with the likes of Jacques Barzun, Paul Lazarsfeld, Mark Van Doren, Lionel Trilling, and I. I. Rabi. The University's graduates during this time were equally accomplished—for example, two alumni of Columbia's Law School, Charles Evans Hughes and Harlan Fiske Stone (who also held the position of Law School dean), served successively as Chief Justices of the United States. Dwight Eisenhower served as Columbia's president from 1948 until he became the President of the United States in 1953.

Research into the atom by faculty members John R. Dunning, I. I. Rabi, Enrico Fermi and Polykarp Kusch placed Columbia's Physics Department in the international spotlight in the 1940s after the first nuclear pile was built to start what became the Manhattan Project. Following the end of World War II, the School of International Affairs was founded in 1946, beginning by offering the Master of International Affairs. To satisfy an increasing desire for skilled public service professionals at home and abroad, the School added the Master of Public Administration degree in 1977. In 1981, the School was renamed the School of International and Public Affairs (SIPA). The School introduced an MPA in Environmental Science and Policy in 2001 and, in 2004, SIPA inaugurated its first doctoral program — the interdisciplinary Ph.D. in Sustainable Development.

During World War II, Columbia, Morningside Heights campus, was one of 131 colleges and universities nationally that took part in the V-12 Navy College Training Program which offered students a path to a Navy commission.

During the 1960s Columbia experienced large-scale student activism centering over the Vietnam War and the demand for greater student rights. Many students, led by the Students for a Democratic Society and its President Mark Rudd protested the University's ties with the defense establishment and its controversial plans to build a gym in Morningside Park. The fervor on campus reached a climax in the spring of 1968 when hundreds of students occupied various buildings on campus. The incident forced the resignation of Columbia's then President, Grayson Kirk and the establishment of the University Senate.

Columbia College first admitted women in the fall of 1983, after a decade of failed negotiations with Barnard College, an all female institution affiliated with the University, to merge the two schools. Barnard College still remains affiliated with Columbia, and all Barnard graduates are issued diplomas authorized by both Columbia University and Barnard College.

During the late 20th century, the University underwent significant academic, structural, and administrative changes as it developed into a major research university. For much of the 19th century, the University consisted of decentralized and separate faculties specializing in Political Science, Philosophy, and Pure Science. In 1979, these faculties were merged into the Graduate School of Arts and Sciences. In 1991, the faculties of Columbia College, the School of General Studies, the Graduate School of Arts and Sciences, the School of the Arts, and the School of Professional Studies were merged into the Faculty of Arts and Sciences, leading to the academic integration and centralized governance of these schools. In 2010, the School of International and Public Affairs, which was previously a part of the Faculty of Arts and Sciences, became an independent faculty.

In 1997, the Columbia Engineering School was renamed the Fu Foundation School of Engineering and Applied Science, in honor of Chinese businessman Z. Y. Fu, who gave Columbia $26 million. The school is popularly referred to as "SEAS" or simply "the engineering school."

=== 21st century ===
==== Bollinger presidency (2002–2023): Expansion, campaign, and globalization ====
Lee C. Bollinger became Columbia's 19th president in June 2002, succeeding George Rupp. Appointed in October 2001 after arriving from the University of Michigan, his presidency emphasized campus expansion, globalization, and science, while navigating national debates.

Key initiatives included the ambitious Manhattanville campus expansion into West Harlem, addressing critical space needs and aiming to build new academic facilities, especially for sciences. Bollinger prioritized globalization, launching the World Leaders Forum and aiming to increase international student numbers. He appointed key leaders like Jeffrey Sachs (Earth Institute), Alan Brinkley (Provost), Nicholas Lemann (Journalism), David Hirsch (Research), and Nicholas Dirks (Arts & Sciences), and planned a Neuroscience Institute.

Bollinger was the defendant in the Supreme Court's 2003 affirmative action cases (Gratz and Grutter), resulting in a split decision. He consistently defended free speech principles during campus controversies involving faculty and students.

The Manhattanville expansion plan progressed, entering environmental review and the city's land-use review process. Concerns about eminent domain grew [with Bollinger calling its potential use necessary to secure land for projects like the Greene Science Center, funded by a landmark $200 million gift.

The university publicly launched a record $4 billion capital campaign in September 2006. Financial aid was improved, eliminating loans for undergraduates from families earning under $50,000, supported by a major gift from trustee Gerry Lenfest.

Globalization efforts continued with the World Leaders Forum and the creation of the Committee on Global Thought, chaired by Joseph Stiglitz. Columbia faculty received multiple Nobel Prizes: Richard Axel and Linda Buck (Medicine, 2004), Edmund Phelps (Economics, 2006), and Orhan Pamuk (Literature, 2006). Václav Havel joined the faculty.

Controversy erupted over a planned 2006 invitation to Iranian President Ahmadinejad, which was ultimately canceled due to logistical and security issues. Later that year, a campus event featuring Minuteman Project speakers was disrupted by protesters. Bollinger strongly condemned the disruption, reaffirming free speech principles while stating protesters do not have the right to silence speakers. Several students faced disciplinary action, and non-affiliated individuals involved were banned from campus.

The 2008 financial crisis impacted Columbia's endowment, but less than peers as only 13% of the operating budget reliant on the endowment (compared to higher percentages at peers like Harvard). The endowment recovered, hitting $8.2B in Oct 2013. Despite the downturn, Columbia pressed on with Manhattanville construction, receiving final state approval in June 2009. Major gifts fueled progress, including $400M from John Kluge upon his death, $50M from the Vagelos family for the Medical Center, $100M from Henry Kravis for the Business School, $30M from Gerry Lenfest for an Arts center, and $200M from Mortimer Zuckerman for the Mind, Brain, Behavior Institute.

Following the repeal of "Don't Ask, Don't Tell," the University Senate voted, 51–17, to invite ROTC back after a 40-year absence, and Bollinger announced an agreement with the Navy. Columbia expanded its Global Centers network (Amman, Beijing, Mumbai, Paris, Nairobi, Istanbul, Santiago), aiming to increase global engagement and international student enrollment (11% in CC in 2011, targeted higher).

In 2013, a minor controversy broke when the campus student newspaper, the Columbia Daily Spectator, reported that students were stealing Nutella from dining halls at great cost to the university. A few days later, the paper's estimates were revealed to be significantly overstated.

From 2014 to 2021, Columbia University pursued significant physical expansion, notably opening major facilities on the Manhattanville campus (ZMBBI, Lenfest Center, The Forum). Key strategic initiatives launched included the Knight First Amendment Institute, Columbia World Projects, and the new Columbia Climate School (2020). A $5 billion university capital campaign was launched (with a $1.5B A&S target), major gifts like $50M for A&S's Uris Hall renovation were secured, and the endowment grew significantly ($14.35B by mid-2021). Columbia gynecologist Robert Hadden, indicted in 2014 for sexually assaulting patients and initially avoiding prison through a controversial plea deal amidst criticism of the university's handling, was ultimately federally convicted and sentenced to 20 years in prison in 2023.

The COVID-19 pandemic starting March 2020 prompted remote operations, hiring/salary freezes, budget cuts, substantial borrowing (~$700M cited), and unpopular retirement contribution cuts, intensifying financial pressures. In 2022, Columbia's reporting of metrics used for university ranking was criticized by Professor of Mathematics Michael Thaddeus, who argued key data supporting the ranking was "inaccurate, dubious or highly misleading." Subsequently, U.S. News & World Report "unranked" Columbia from its 2022 list of Best Colleges saying that it could not verify the data submitted by the university. In June 2023, Columbia University announced their undergraduate schools would no longer participate in U.S. News & World Report's rankings, following the lead of its law, medical and nursing schools. A press release cited concerns that such rankings unduly influence applicants and "distill a university's profile into a composite of data categories."

==== Shafik presidency (2023–2024) ====
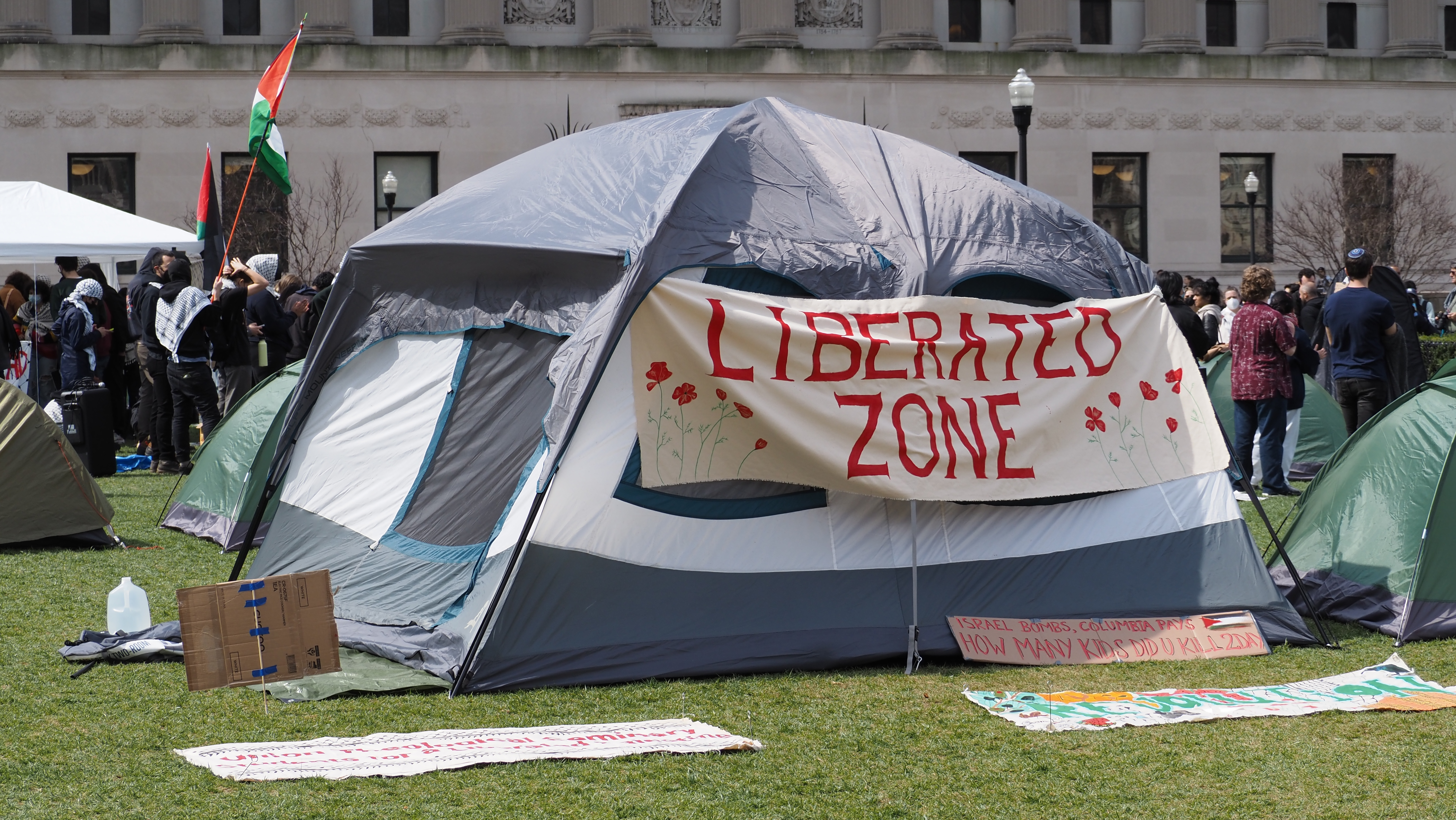
A tent with a "Liberated Zone" banner at the Gaza Solidarity Encampment on the Butler lawns, April 2024.

Beginning in fall 2023, escalating Columbia protests over the Gaza war, marked by debates on antisemitism, culminated in a major encampment, the police clearing of Hamilton Hall in April 2024, and President Minouche Shafik's subsequent resignation. Shafik was replaced by Katrina Armstrong as Acting President.

==== 2025 ====
Following critical reports on antisemitism, campus conflict continued into 2025 as the second Trump administration threatened to revoke federal funding and demanded policy changes, prompting student expulsions, arrests of Palestinian students and alumni, and new university disciplinary measures. On March 21, 2025, university leaders agreed to the government's demands to "overhaul disciplinary processes, ban masks at protests, add 36 officers with the authority to make arrests and appoint a new senior vice provost to oversee academic programs focused on the Middle East" among other demands. On March 28, 2025, Claire Shipman was named new Acting President. The final agreement, reached on July 23, 2025, restored the vast majority of grant funding and finalized the terms of the March announcement while maintaining what the university characterized as its full independent authority over hiring, admissions, and academic speech.

== See also ==
- Columbia College of Columbia University, the oldest liberal arts undergraduate college at Columbia University, New York
- Columbia Daily Spectator, a student newspaper at Columbia University, New York
- Columbia Journal, the graduate writing program's student-founded, student-run literary journal Columbia University School of the Arts
- Columbia Journalism Review, a bimonthly journal published by the Columbia University Graduate School of Journalism
- Columbia Law School

- Columbia Business Law Review, a monthly journal published by students at Columbia Law School

- The Pulitzer Prize
- The School at Columbia University, New York City
- Teachers College, Columbia University's Graduate School of Education
