= Nathaniel Fish Moore =

American university administrator

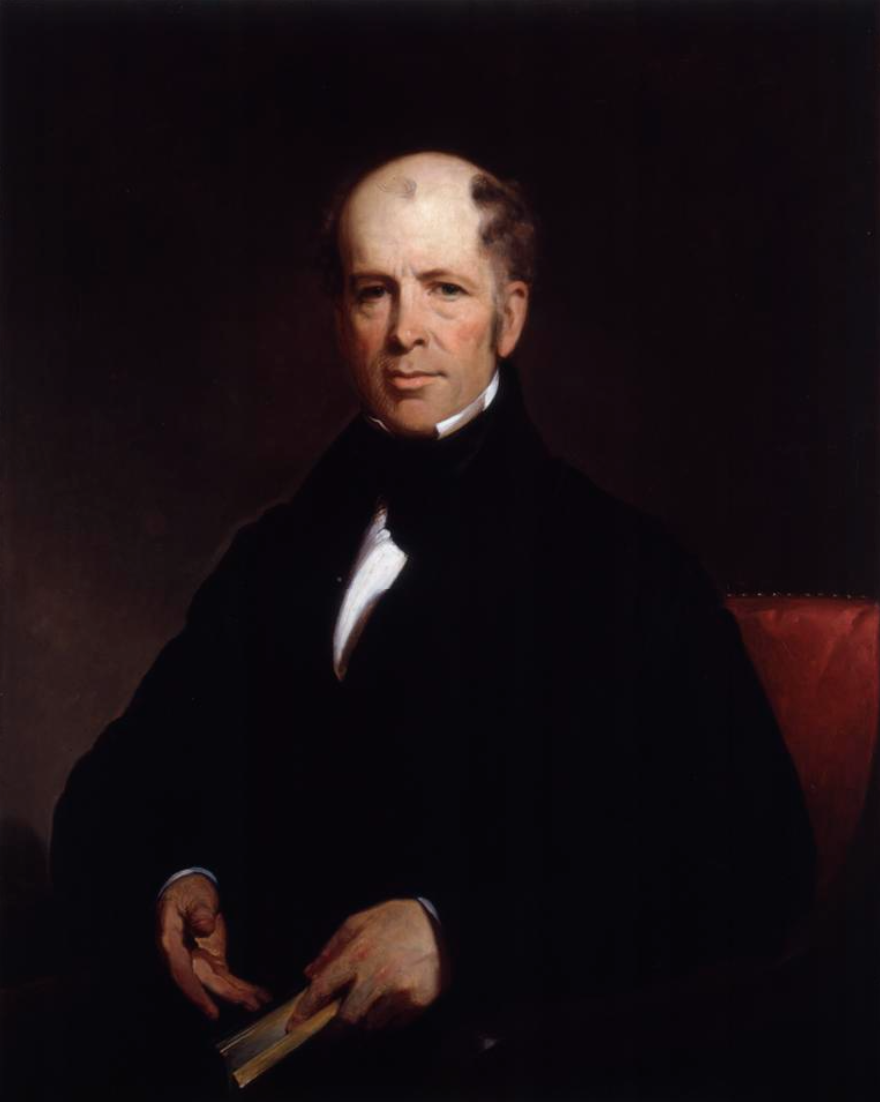

8th President of Columbia University
- In office 1842–1849
- Preceded by: William Alexander Duer
- Succeeded by: Charles King

Personal details
- Born: December 25, 1782
- Died: April 27, 1872 (aged 89) Hudson, New York
- Education: Columbia University

Nathaniel Fish Moore (December 25, 1782 – April 27, 1872) was the eighth president of Columbia College; he had earlier been a lawyer and served on the faculty. He was the nephew of the college's former president Benjamin Moore.

Moore earned his AB at Columbia in 1802, during which time his uncle Benjamin Moore served as president of the college. At Columbia, Nathaniel Fish Moore was a member of the Philolexian Society. He was promoted to MA in 1805.

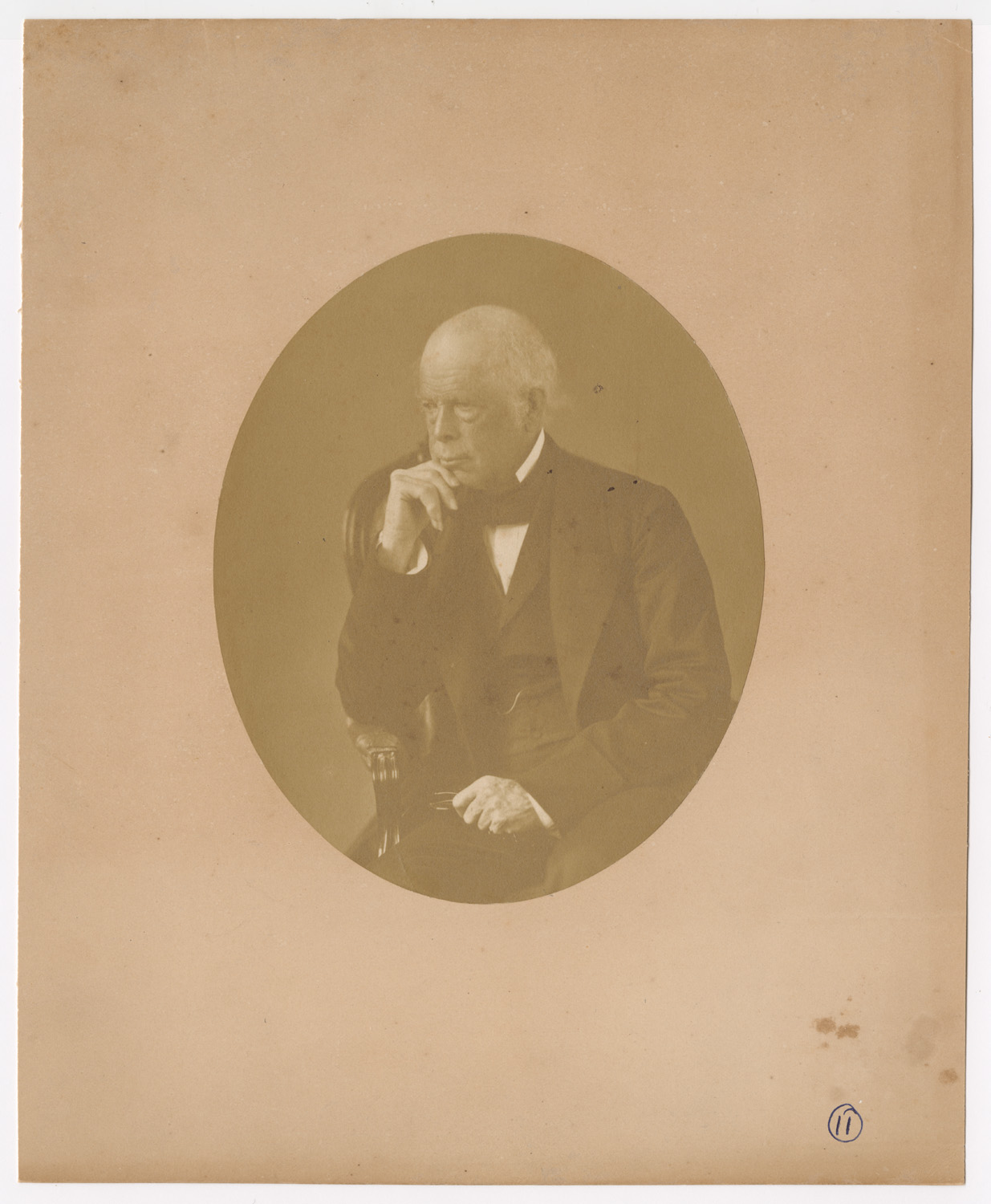
A photograph of Moore from 1860

In 1817, Moore began his career at Columbia College as an adjunct professor and in 1820 was named a professor of Greek and Latin. In 1830 became titled the Jay Professor of the Greek Language and Literature.

Moore resigned his professorship in 1835 to travel to Europe and the Holy Land, and was appointed as the first full-time Librarian of the College in 1838 upon his return.

Four years later, in 1842, Moore was elected the eighth president of the college, resigning under unremarkable circumstances in 1849.

After visiting the Great Exhibition in London in 1851, he became interested in photography, and was one of the first amateur photographers in New York City. He was reportedly so interested in his new hobby “that he frequently came to dinner wearing cotton gloves, because his hands were so stained with photographic chemicals.”

== Selected publications ==
- Ancient mineralogy; or, An inquiry respecting mineral substances mentioned by the ancients: with occasional remarks on the uses to which they were applied. G. & C. Carvill & co. 1834.; 2nd edition. Harper & brothers. 1859.
- Lectures on the Greek language and literature. Windt and Conrad. 1835.
- A historical sketch of Columbia University, in the city of New-York. Printed for Columbia College. 1846.
- Moore, Nathaniel Fish (1946). Pargellis, Stanley; Butler, Ruth Lapham (eds.). Diary; a trip from New York to the falls of St. Anthony in 1845.

== Notes ==
Academic offices
Preceded by William Alexander Duer	President of Columbia College; 1842–1849	Succeeded by Charles King
