= William Alexander Duer =

American politician and educator (1780–1858)

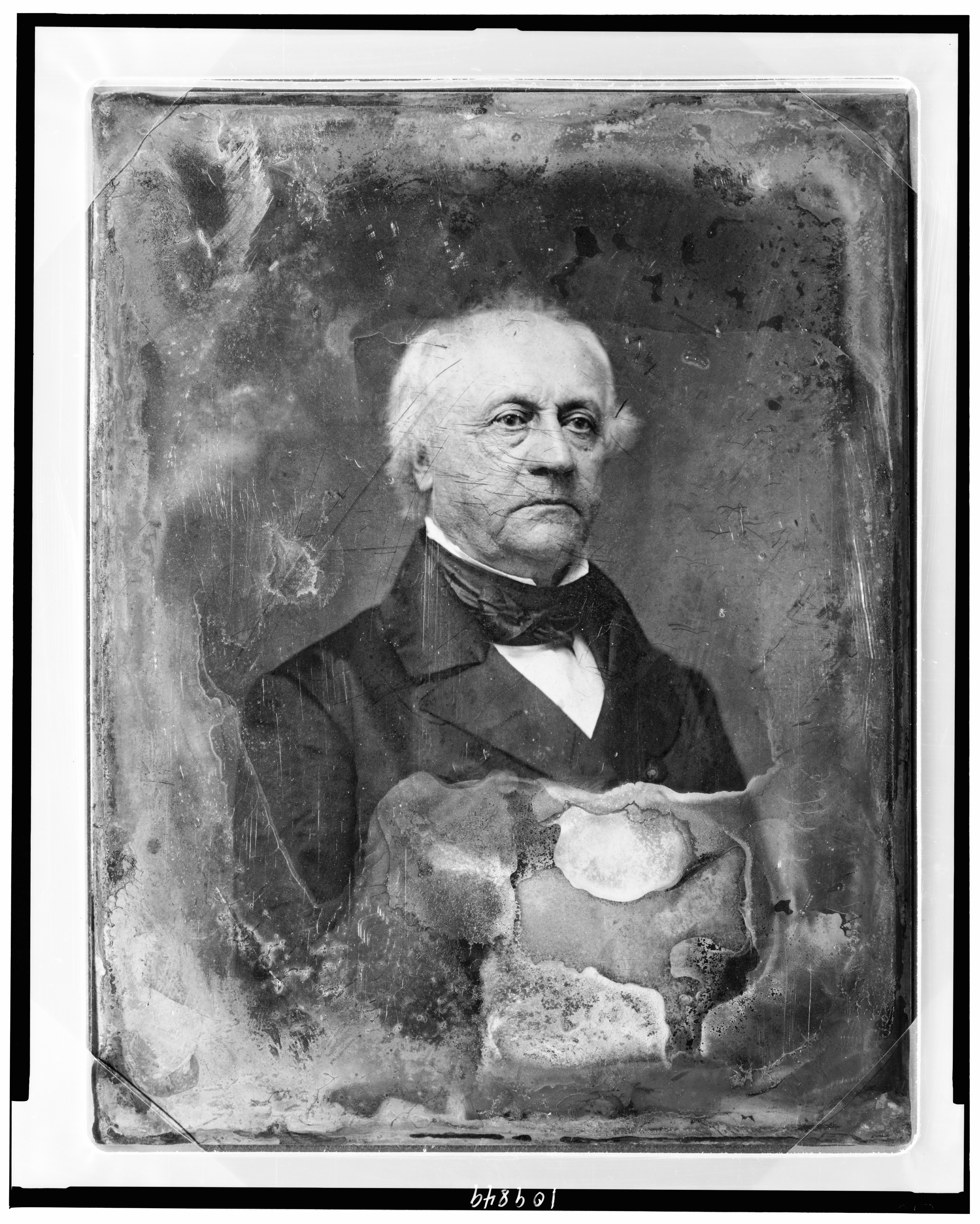
- Duer, 1844–1858

7th President of Columbia University
- In office 1829–1842
- Preceded by: William Harris
- Succeeded by: Nathaniel Fish Moore

Personal details
- Born: September 8, 1780 New York City
- Died: May 30, 1858 (aged 77) Staten Island, New York, U.S.
- Resting place: First Presbyterian Churchyard, Morristown, New Jersey
- Spouse: Hannah Maria Denning
- Parent(s): William Duer; Catherine Alexander
- Relatives: John Duer (brother); William Duer (nephew); William Denning (father-in-law); Lord Stirling (grandfather)

William Alexander Duer (September 8, 1780 – May 30, 1858) was an American lawyer, jurist, and educator from New York City who served as the President of Columbia University from 1829 to 1842. He was also a slaveholder, owning numerous enslaved African Americans.

== Early life ==
He was the son of William, a member of the Continental Congress and Catherine Alexander Duer. His brother John Duer was a New York lawyer and jurist. His nephew William Duer, the son of John Duer, also served in Congress. William A. Duer studied law in Philadelphia, and with Nathaniel Pendleton in New York.

== Career ==
During the quasi-war with France in 1798 he obtained the appointment of midshipman in the navy, and served under Stephen Decatur. After the conflict with France ended, he resumed his studies with Pendleton, and was admitted to the bar in 1802.

He engaged in business with Edward Livingston, who was then district attorney and mayor of New York. After Livingston moved to New Orleans, Duer formed a professional partnership with his brother-in-law, Beverley Robinson. In addition to practicing law, he contributed to a partisan weekly paper called the Corrector, conducted by Peter Irving in support of Aaron Burr. Duer later moved to New Orleans to again form a law partnership with Livingston, and also made a study of Spanish civil law, which had governed New Orleans in its early years. Duer found the climate in New Orleans disagreeable to his health, and this factor coupled with his marriage with the daughter of William Denning, a prominent New York politician and businessman, convinced him to return to New York City.

In New York, he contributed literary articles to the Morning Chronicle, the newspaper of his friend Peter Irving. He next opened an office in Rhinebeck, and in 1814 was elected to the New York State Assembly, where he was appointed chairman of a committee on colleges and academies, and succeeded in passing a bill, which is the original of the existing law on the subject of the common-school income. He was also chairman of the committee that arranged the constitutionality of the state law vesting the right of navigation in Livingston and Robert Fulton, and throughout his service bore a prominent part in promoting canal legislation.

In 1823, Duer was appointed a judge of the New York Supreme Court, a position he held until 1829. That year, he was elected president of Columbia College (now Columbia University), where he remained until failing health compelled him to resign in 1842. During his administration, he delivered to the senior class a course of lectures on the constitutional jurisprudence of the United States (published in 1833; revised ed., 1856). Duer also delivered a eulogy on President James Monroe from the portico of the city hall. After his retirement, Duer resided in Morristown, New Jersey.

=== Works ===
After retiring, Duer wrote the life of his grandfather, Lord Stirling (published by the Historical Society of New Jersey). In 1847 he delivered an address in the college chapel before the literary societies of Columbia, and in 1848 an historical address before the St. Nicholas Society, which gives early reminiscences of New York, and describes the scenes connected with the inauguration of President Washington, both of which were published. Duer was the author of two pamphlets addressed to Cadwallader D. Colden on the "Steamboat Controversy," and the "Life of William Alexander, Earl of Stirling" (New York, 1847).

== Personal life ==
He was married to Hannah Maria Denning (1782–1862), daughter of William Denning, a prominent whig of New York. Together they had:

- Henrietta Amelia Duer (d. 1824)
- Frances Maria Duer (1809–1905), who married Henry Sheaffe Hoyt, nephew of Jesse Hoyt, a Collector of the Port of New York who was known for his role in the Swartwout-Hoyt scandal.
- Catherine Theodora Duer (1811–1877)
- William Alexander Denning Duer (1812–1891), a banker with Prime, Ward & King who married Caroline King (1813–1863), daughter of James G. King
- Eleanor Duer (1814–1892)
- Edward Alexander Duer (1815–1831)
- Sarah Henderson Duer (1817–1856)
- John King Duer (1818–1859), who married Georgeanna Huyler (1818–1884)
- Elizabeth Denning Duer (1821–1900), who married Archibald Gracie King (1821–1897), son of James G. King
- Henrietta Duer (1828–1832), who died young.

Duer died on Staten Island on May 30, 1858; he was buried at First Presbyterian Churchyard, Morristown.

== Notes ==
Academic offices
| Preceded by William Harris | President of Columbia College; 1829–1842 | Succeeded by Nathaniel Fish Moore |
