= President of Columbia University =

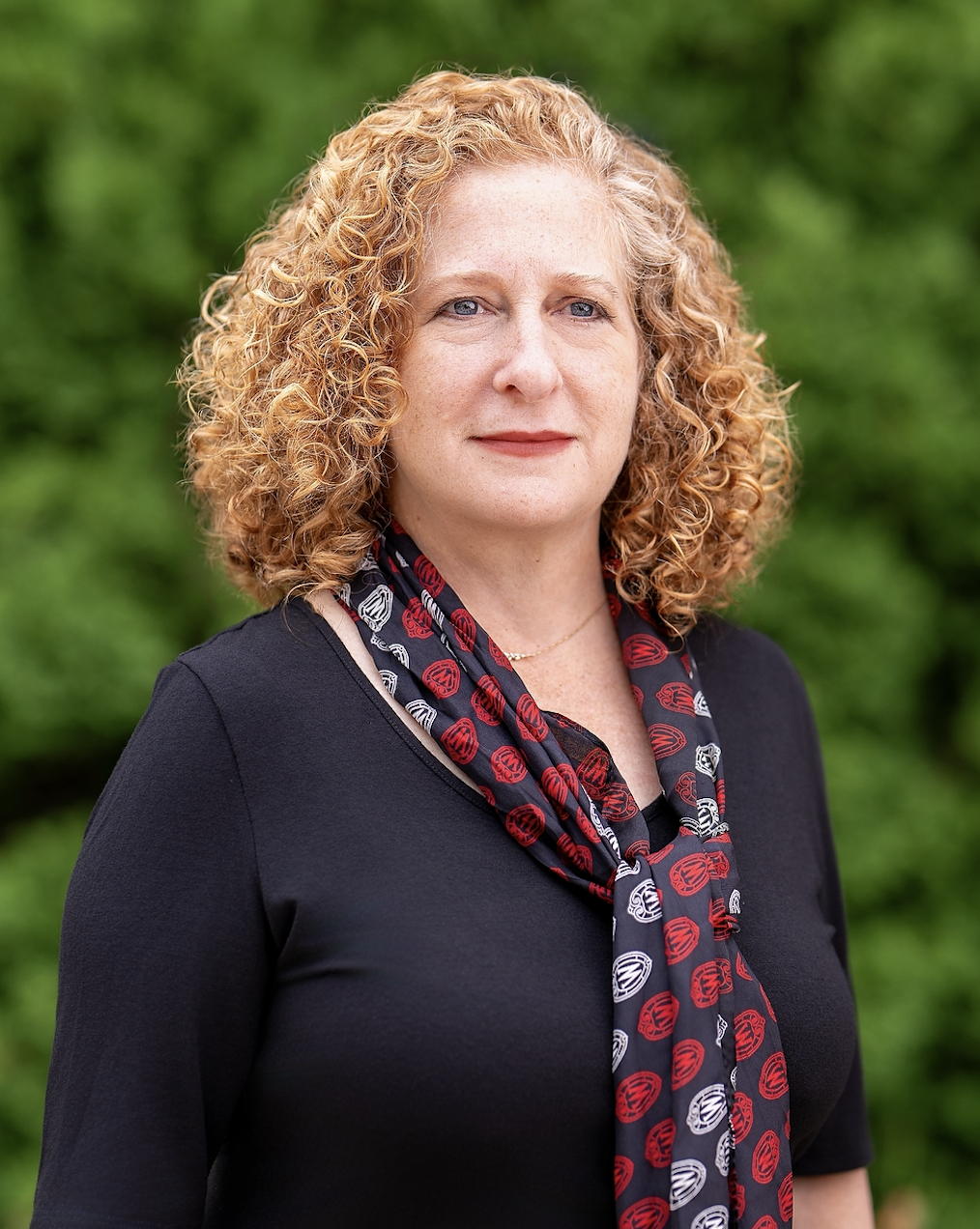
- Incumbent; Jennifer Mnookin since July 1, 2026
- Appointer: Trustees of Columbia University in the City of New York
- Formation: 1754
- First holder: Samuel Johnson
- Website: https://president.columbia.edu/

The president of Columbia University is the chief executive of Columbia University in New York City.

The title of president of King’s College was created in 1754 by the original royal charter for the university, issued by George II, and the power to appoint the president was given to an autonomous board of trustees. The university suspended operations upon the outbreak of the American Revolutionary War, during which no individual served as president. When it was resuscitated by the New York State Legislature, the university was placed directly under the control of the Board of Regents of the University of the State of New York; its chancellor, George Clinton, served as the de facto president of Columbia University.

Through the efforts of Alexander Hamilton and John Jay, control of the university was returned to a private board of trustees in 1787, which has to this day maintained the right to appoint or remove the president, who also serves on the board ex officio. The university's first president was Samuel Johnson, who held the office from 1754 to 1763, and its current president is Jennifer Mnookin, whose tenure began on July 1, 2026.

Upon the founding of the university, it was stipulated by the vestrymen of Trinity Church, on whose land King's College sat, that every president must be a member of the Church of England; otherwise, the land would revert to the church. As such, every single president of the university until the appointment of Dwight D. Eisenhower was Anglican, while the first six presidents, with the exception of William Samuel Johnson, were all either Anglican priests or bishops. Michael I. Sovern, appointed in 1980, was the university's first Jewish president. In 2023, Minouche Shafik became the first woman to serve as president of the university.

From 1902 to 1970, every president was involved in foreign relations in some capacity: Nicholas Murray Butler was the president of the Carnegie Endowment for International Peace from 1925 to 1945, and was awarded a Nobel Peace Prize for his promotion of the Kellogg–Briand Pact; Dwight D. Eisenhower served as Supreme Commander of the Allied Expeditionary Force during World War II, and after his tenure would serve as President of the United States; and Grayson L. Kirk and Andrew W. Cordier were both instrumental to the formation of the United Nations.

As established by Columbia University's governing statutes, it is the duty of the president to exercise jurisdiction over all affairs of the university; to call special meetings of the University Senate, faculties, and administration; to report to the Trustees of Columbia on the state and needs of the university annually; and to administer discipline. According to the university charter and statutes, the consent of the president is necessary for any act made by a faculty or administrative board, unless their veto is overridden by two-thirds vote. Additionally, the president is able to grant leaves of absences, give faculty permission to use university laboratories for experiments, and confer academic and honorary degrees on behalf of the board of trustees.

The president is ex officio a permanent member of the Pulitzer Prize Board, and has annually presented the awards to its recipients since 1984. In addition, the president is a member of the board of trustees of Teachers College and an ex officio member of the board of trustees of Barnard College.

== List of presidents ==
The following persons have served as president of Columbia University:

No.	Image	President	Term start	Term end	Refs.
Presidents of King's College (1754–1784)
1		Samuel Johnson (Note: left due to economic instability at the college brought on by the French and Indian War, conflict with Presbyterians, and outbreaks of smallpox on campus)	1754	1763	
2		Myles Cooper (Note: fled to England after being confronted by an angry mob and never returned to New York)	1763	May 1775	
acting (Note: appointed president pro tempore)		Benjamin Moore, BA 1768	1775	1776	
Presidents of Columbia College (1784–1896)
acting (Note: as Chancellor of the University of the State of New York)		George Clinton (Note: 1st governor of New York and later 4th vice president of the United States)	1784	1787	
3		William Samuel Johnson (Note: signed the Constitution of the United States; served as United States Senator from Connecticut)	1787	1800	
4		Charles Henry Wharton (Note: never showed up to campus and resigned within a year)	May 25, 1801	December 11, 1801	
5		Benjamin Moore, BA 1768 (Note: 2nd bishop of the Episcopal Diocese of New York; resigned due to poor health)	December 31, 1801	May 6, 1811	
6		William Harris (Note: shared authority with Provost John Mitchell Mason until 1816)	1811	October 18, 1829 (Note: died in office)	
7		William Alexander Duer (Note: judge of the New York Supreme Court; resigned due to poor health)	1829	1842	
8		Nathaniel Fish Moore, BA 1802 (Note: previously first full-time librarian of the college)	1842	1849	
9		Charles King (Note: presided over move to Madison Avenue campus; resigned due to poor health)	1849	1864	
10		Frederick Augustus Porter Barnard	1864	April 27, 1889	
acting		Henry Drisler, BA 1839	1867	1867	
acting		Henry Drisler, BA 1839	1888	1889	
11		Seth Low, BA 1870 (Note: presided over move to Morningside Heights campus; 23rd mayor of Brooklyn)	1890	1901 (Note: resigned to become 92nd mayor of New York City)	
Presidents of Columbia University (1896–present)
acting		John Howard Van Amringe, BA 1860, MA 1863	1899	1899	
12		Nicholas Murray Butler, BA 1882, MA 1883, PhD 1884 (Note: Nobel Peace Prize laureate in 1931)	1902	September 30, 1945	
acting		Frank D. Fackenthal, BA 1906	October 4, 1945	June 6, 1948	
13		Dwight D. Eisenhower (Note: on leave while Supreme Allied Commander Europe of NATO)	June 7, 1948	January 19, 1953 (Note: resigned to become the 34th president of the United States the following day)	
acting (Note: Kirk became acting head of the university when Eisenhower was recalled to duty to head American and NATO forces in Europe during the Korean War. Kirk remained as acting head when Eisenhower became a candidate for the U.S. presidency in 1952.)		Grayson L. Kirk (Note: retired after 1968 protests)	December 19, 1950	January 19, 1953	
14		Grayson L. Kirk	January 20, 1953	August 23, 1968	
acting		Andrew W. Cordier	August 23, 1968	August 20, 1969	
15		Andrew W. Cordier	August 20, 1969	August 31, 1970	
16		William J. McGill	September 1, 1970	June 30, 1980	
17		Michael I. Sovern, BA 1953, JD 1955	July 1, 1980	June 30, 1993	
18		George Erik Rupp	July 1, 1993	June 30, 2002 (Note: became president of International Rescue Committee)	
19		Lee Bollinger, JD 1971 (Note: presided over construction of Manhattanville campus)	July 1, 2002	June 30, 2023	
20		Minouche Shafik, Baroness Shafik	July 1, 2023	August 14, 2024 (Note: resigned after the 2024 pro-Palestinian campus occupation and returned to England)	
interim (Note: Chief executive officer of the Columbia University Irving Medical Center)		Katrina Armstrong	August 14, 2024	March 28, 2025	
acting		Claire Shipman, BA 1986, MIA 1994	March 28, 2025	June 30, 2026	
21		Jennifer Mnookin	July 1, 2026	present	

Table notes:

== President's House ==
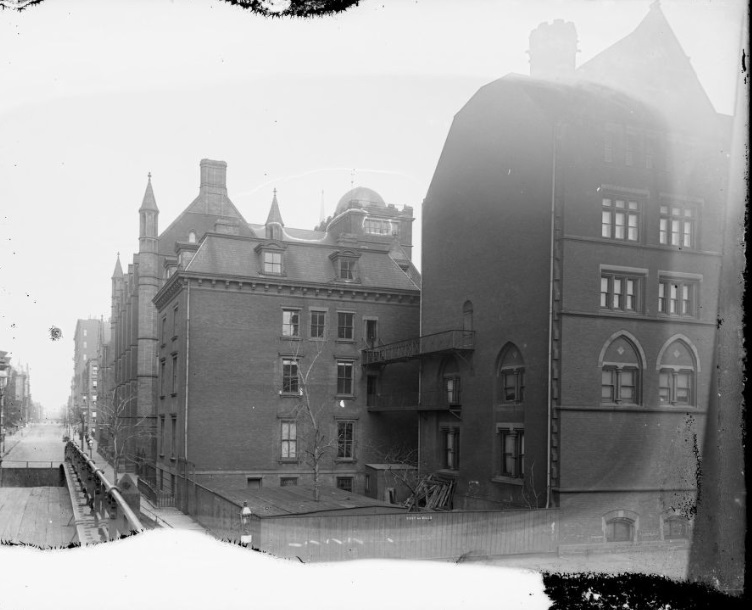
The President's House (1862–1897) at Columbia's Midtown campus

At Columbia's midtown Manhattan campus (1857–1896), a house for the president was built in 1862 near the corner of 49th Street and Fourth Avenue (later Park Avenue), which served as the home of both Charles King and Frederick Augustus Porter Barnard. It was the president's official residence until that campus' demolition in 1897.

The current house for the president of Columbia University, located on the university's Morningside Heights campus, was built in 1912, and has served as the official residence of the university president since, with the exception of during the tenure of Michael Sovern, who chose to instead continue living in his Upper East Side apartment. The house was reoccupied upon the accession of George Rupp in 1993, and has remained in use since then.

Demolition of the building was considered as late as 1991, though the building underwent a comprehensive renovation in 2005.
