= Benjamin Moore (bishop) =

Episcopal bishop of New York (1748–1816)

The Right Reverend Benjamin Moore
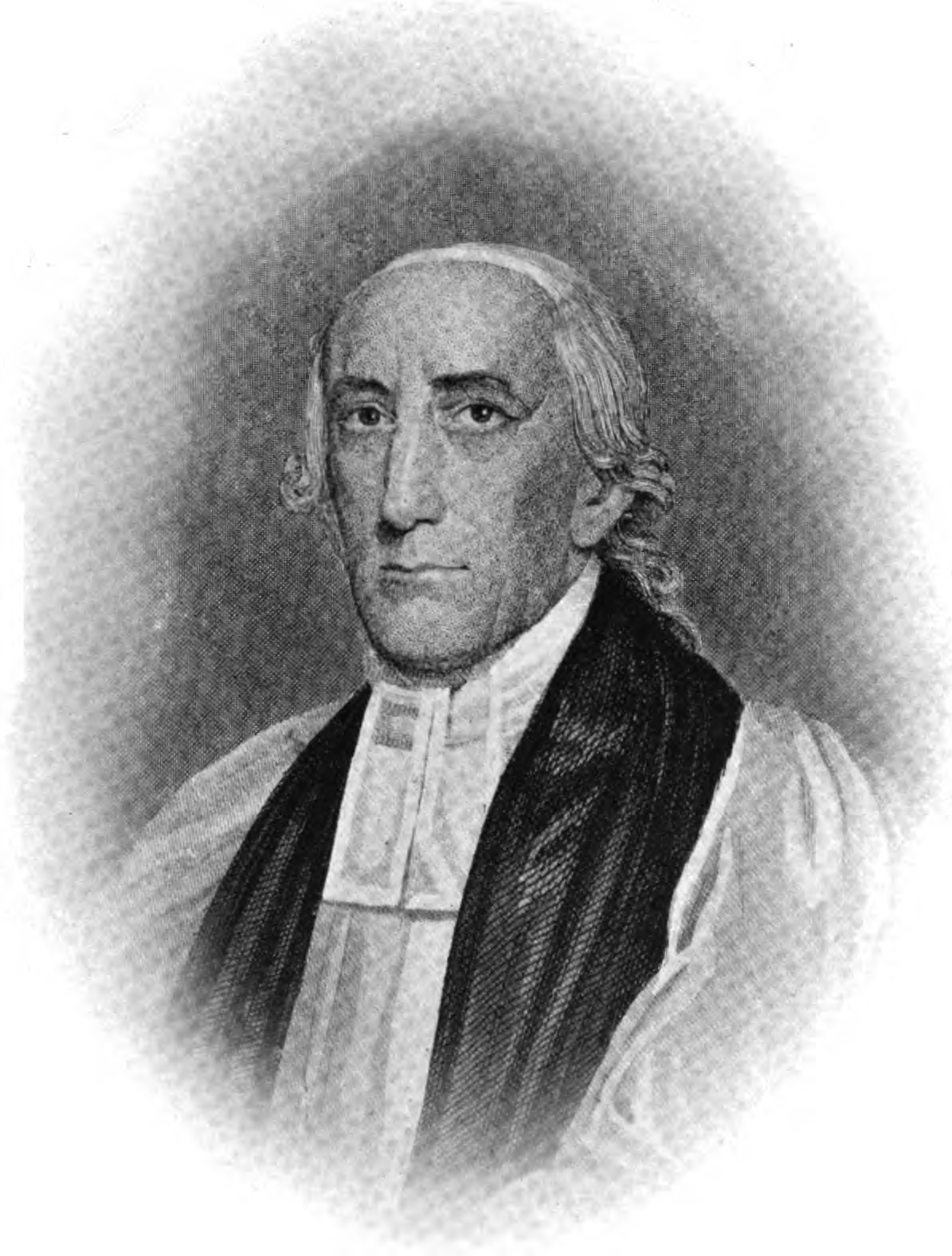

2nd Bishop of New York
- In office 1815–1816
- Preceded by: Samuel Provoost
- Succeeded by: John Henry Hobart

5th President of Columbia University
- In office 1801–1810
- Preceded by: Charles Henry Wharton
- Succeeded by: William Harris

Acting President of King's College
- In office 1775–1784
- Preceded by: Myles Cooper (president)
- Succeeded by: George Clinton (acting)

Personal details
- Born: October 5, 1748 Newtown, New York
- Died: February 27, 1816 (aged 67) Greenwich Village, New York
- Spouse: Charity Clarke (after 1779)
- Children: Clement Clarke Moore
- Parent(s): Samuel Moore; Sarah Fish Moore
- Education: King's College

Benjamin Moore (October 5, 1748 – February 27, 1816) was the second Episcopal bishop of New York and the fifth President of Columbia University. He is remembered for having given Holy Communion to Alexander Hamilton on his deathbed, and for being the father of Clement Clarke Moore, the reputed author of the 1823 Christmas poem "A Visit From St. Nicholas."

== Early life ==
Moore was born in Newtown, New York, now known as Elmhurst, Queens, in 1748, the son of Samuel Moore and Sarah (née Fish) Moore. He was the great-great-grandson of John Moore, the first Independent minister allowed in New England, and great-grandson of Capt. Samuel Moore, on whose property the Newtown Pippin apple was first cultivated.

He attended King's College (now Columbia University), graduating in 1768 with a degree of A.B. Moore received a master's degree from King's College in 1771, alongside Founding Father Gouverneur Morris. He traveled to England and was ordained deacon in the Anglican Church by Bishop Richard Terrick in Fulham Palace on June 24, 1774. He was advanced to the priesthood the next day.

== Career ==
Not long after returning to America, in 1775, Moore was made assistant rector at Trinity Church, New York City's original Anglican church, located then as now on Broadway at the western end of Wall Street. He was also named president pro tempore of Kings College and served until the arrival of the Continental Army in the city in April 1776 caused the college to close and disperse.

Trinity rector Charles Inglis was an outspoken Tory who welcomed the subsequent British occupation of New York. Moore continued to work at his side but stayed publicly neutral on the political questions surrounding the American Revolutionary War. After the British defeat Inglis left for England, and Moore was elected Trinity's rector in 1783. Returning Patriot church members, among them Declaration of Independence co-author Robert R. Livingston and soon-to-be New York Mayor James Duane, objected to the choice, and in early 1784 Moore agreed to step aside in favor of Samuel Provoost, the only Anglican priest in New York who had openly supported the Revolution.

The Episcopal Church of the United States of America (ECUSA) became independent of the Anglican Church after the war, establishing its own organization of dioceses, and Provoost was elected the first bishop of New York in 1786, a position he held concurrently with the Trinity rectorship. Moore continued in his duties as assistant rector until 1800, when Provoost resigned and Moore was elected rector.

Concurrently with his church work Moore served from 1784 to 1787 as professor of rhetoric and logic at Columbia College, which in 1789 awarded him the degree of doctor of sacred theology.

=== Bishop of New York ===
Moore was elected coadjutor bishop of New York in 1801 to assist Provoost, who wished to retire. The diocese of New York covered the entire state and the population was rapidly increasing upstate, with many migrants from New England. This area had been opened up for settlement and development as agricultural lands after the war due to the cession by the Iroquois League, allies of the British, of nearly five million acres of land.

Moore was the 9th bishop in the ECUSA, and was consecrated in St. Michael's Church, Trenton, New Jersey by Bishops William White, Thomas John Claggett, and Abraham Jarvis. That same year, Moore was elected President of Columbia College, as the compromise choice of a board of trustees deadlocked between Episcopal and non-Episcopal members. A contemporary explained the choice thusly: "While he was a true, consistent, and I may add, an uncompromising Episcopalian, he was neither an aggressive or prescribing one." Because of his church responsibilities he neither taught nor was involved in the details of administration.

In 1811, Moore had a stroke. He resigned as Columbia's president, and asked for the election of an additional coadjutor bishop to assist him. John Henry Hobart was elected to the post that year. In 1815, Bishop Provoost died, and Moore succeeded him to become the second full bishop of New York.

=== Last communion for Hamilton ===
On July 11, 1804, Moore was summoned to the deathbed of Alexander Hamilton, who had been fatally wounded in a duel with Aaron Burr; Hamilton asked to receive holy communion. Moore made two objections: that to participate in a duel was a mortal sin, and that Hamilton, although he was undoubtedly a sincere Christian in his later years, was not an Episcopalian. Moore withdrew, but was persuaded by the urgent pleas of Hamilton's friends to return. On receiving Hamilton's solemn assurance that he repented for his part in the duel, Moore gave him communion.

== Personal life ==
In 1779, Moore married Charity Clarke, daughter of English officer Major Thomas Clarke, who had stayed in the colony after his service in the French and Indian War, and Mary Stilwell Clarke. Thomas Clarke had acquired a large country estate along the Hudson River in Manhattan that he dubbed Chelsea, after the Royal Hospital Chelsea, a retirement home for soldiers in London, England, and his widow and daughter continued to live there after his death in 1776. Charity Clarke wrote letters to a cousin in London in the 1760s and 1770s that are still cited as examples of early patriotic sentiment, but she and her mother stayed in British-occupied New York during the Revolutionary war.

The Moores had one child together, Clement Clarke Moore (1779–1863), who is credited and is most widely known as the author of the Christmas poem "A Visit from St. Nicholas." They inherited the Chelsea estate and passed it on to their son, who developed it into the neighborhood of Chelsea, Manhattan.

On February 27, 1816, Moore died in Greenwich Village, New York. He was buried at Trinity Church. North Moore Street, Manhattan, is named in his honor.

== Notes ==
Academic offices
Preceded by Myles Cooper as President	President of King's College; Acting; 1775–1784	Succeeded by George Clinton; Acting
Preceded by Charles Henry Wharton	President of Columbia College; 1801–1810	Succeeded by William Harris
Episcopal Church (USA) titles
Preceded by Samuel Provoost	2nd Bishop of New York; 1815–1816	Succeeded by John Henry Hobart
