= William Samuel Johnson =

American Founding Father and judge (1727–1819)

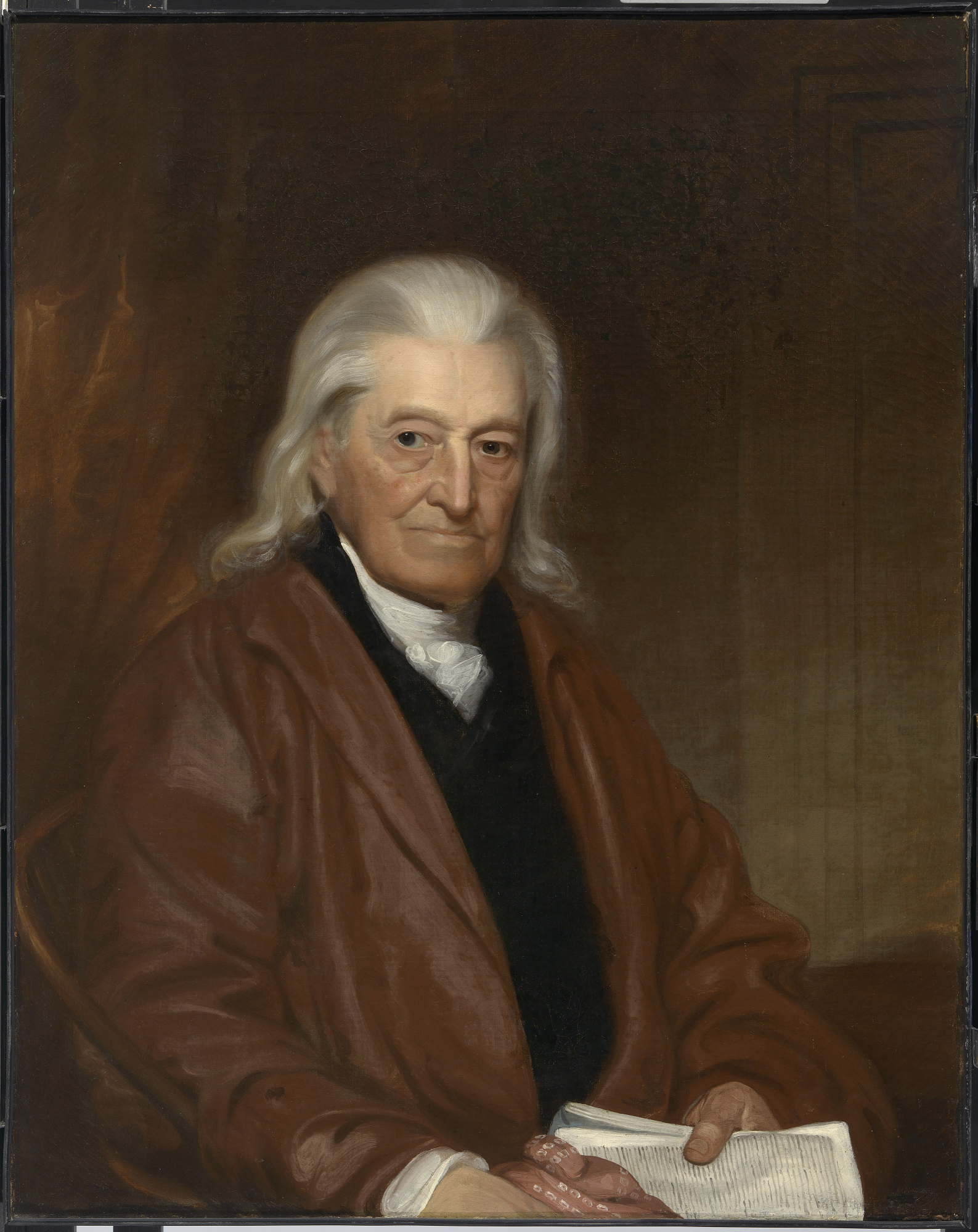
- Portrait by John Wesley Jarvis, between 1809 and 1819

United States Senator from Connecticut
- In office March 4, 1789 – March 3, 1791
- Preceded by: Office created
- Succeeded by: Roger Sherman

3rd President of Columbia University
- In office 1787–1800
- Preceded by: George Clinton (acting)
- Succeeded by: Charles Henry Wharton

Personal details
- Born: October 7, 1727 Stratford, Connecticut Colony, British America
- Died: November 14, 1819 (aged 92) Stratford, Connecticut, U.S.
- Resting place: Christ Episcopal Church Cemetery, Stratford
- Party: Pro-Administration
- Spouse: Anne Beach
- Children: Elizabeth Johnson
- Parent(s): Samuel Johnson; Charity Floyd Nicoll
- Relatives: Daniel Verplanck (son-in-law); Gulian C. Verplanck (grandson)
- Education: Yale College
- Profession: Politician, clergyman

Military service
- Branch/service: Connecticut Colonial Militia
- Rank: Colonel

William Samuel Johnson (October 7, 1727 – November 14, 1819) was an American Founding Father and statesman. He attended all of the four founding American Congresses: the Stamp Act Congress in 1765, the Congress of the Confederation in 1785–1787, the United States Constitutional Convention in 1787 where he was chairman of the Committee of Style that drafted the final version of the United States Constitution, and as a senator from Connecticut in the first United States Congress in 1789–1791. He also served as the third president of Columbia University (then known as Columbia College).

== Early life and academic career ==
Coat of Arms of William Samuel Johnson

William Samuel Johnson was born in Stratford, Connecticut, on October 7, 1727, to the Reverend Samuel Johnson, a well-known Anglican clergyman, educator, and later president of King's College, and Johnson's first wife, Charity Floyd Nicoll. Johnson received his primary education from his father, who ran a small Stratford Academy boarding school for students. He then graduated from Yale College in 1744, winning the George Berkely Scholarship. He went on to receive a master's degree from Yale in 1747 and an honorary degree from Harvard the same year. He would later receive an honorary master's from King's College in 1761, a Doctor of Law from Oxford in 1766, become president of Columbia College (previously King's College New York now Columbia University) on May 21, 1787, and receive a Doctor of Law degree there in 1788.

== Career ==
Although his father urged him to enter the clergy, Johnson decided instead to pursue a legal career. Self-educated in the law, he quickly developed an important clientele and established business connections extending beyond the boundaries of his native colony and was frequently consulted on inter-colony legal issues. He also held a commission in the Connecticut colonial militia for over 20 years, rising from ensign to the rank of colonel. He served as Deputy in the lower house (1761 and 1765) of the Connecticut Legislature and was Governor's Assistant (senator) in the upper house (1766 to1775).

Johnson was first attracted to the Patriot cause by what he and his associates considered Parliament's unwarranted interference in the government of the colonies. At this time he was somewhat of a radical, writing about “chains and shackles,” “stamps and slavery,” and the “late fatal acts” that would reduce America to “Roman provinces in the time of the Caesar.” He started forming alliances with the Connecticut Son's of Liberty and working against the re-election of Loyalist Governor Thomas Fitch.

He was elected one of three delegates from Connecticut to the Stamp Act Congress, where in 1765 he served on the committee defining the rights of British Colonists arguing the right of the colonies to decide tax policies for themselves. According to his biographer Beardsley, Johnson "was a guiding and controlling spirit in the Assembly." He authored the seminal Report of Committee at Congress on Colonia Rights, that evolved into the Stamp Act Declaration of Rights and Grievances, the final version of which is in his hand. He was also on the committee that authored the Petition to the King.

The declaration, petitions, and pressure from London merchants forced Parliament to repeal the Stamp Act in 1766. But that year, Connecticut faced a new problem with a seventy year old unsettled legal case involving Mohegan Indians lands. The British wanted to use the case as a pretext to cancel Connecticut's Royal Charter of 1662. Johnson agreed to become a special Colonial Agent to fight the case. Johnson left his family, his political career, and his legal practice to argue in London for Connecticut's charter, where he lived from 1767 to 1771, while retaining his role as Assistant.

=== American Revolution ===
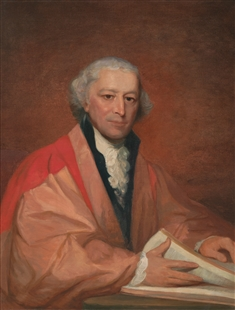
Portrait by Gilbert Stuart

While a Colonial Agent he sharply criticized British policy toward the colonies. His experience in Britain convinced him that Britain's policy was shaped more by ignorance of American conditions, not through the sinister designs of a wicked government, as many Patriots alleged. As the Patriots became more radical in their demands, Johnson found it difficult to commit himself wholeheartedly to the cause. Although he believed British policy unwise, he found it difficult to break his own connections with the mother country. A scholar of international renown, he had many friends in Britain and among the British and American Loyalists. The English author Samuel Johnson said of him, "Of all those whom the various accidents of life have brought within my notice, there is scarce anyone whose acquaintance I have more desired to cultivate than yours." He was also bound to Britain by religious and professional ties. He enjoyed close associations with the Anglican Church in England and with the scholarly community at Oxford, which awarded him an honorary degree in 1766.

Fearing the consequences of independence for both the colonies and the mother country, Johnson sought to avoid extremism and to reach a compromise on the outstanding political differences between the protagonists. However, his court case against the British government that was supposed to take a few months was dragged out for five years, during which time he was away from his family, lost his law firm's clients, and received little thanks, little reward, and endured criticism for his association with the British. He returned home late in 1771, just in time to spend three months with his father before he died. He was appointed a member of the colony's Supreme Court (1772–1774).

He was elected as a delegate in 1774 to the Continental Congress but turned down the honor in favor of his protégée Roger Sherman. The Connecticut assembly, after the Battles of Lexington and Concord, over his strong personal objections, sent him on a dangerous visit through both Patriot Massachusetts militia and British army lines in Boston to the British commander General Thomas Gage to negotiate an end to the fighting by making a separate peace with the British. He succeeded, but on returning across the lines again to Connecticut, he found the Assembly had changed their mind, voted for war, then adjourned, leaving no instructions for Johnson. Even after the Declaration of Independence, he believed that the American Revolution was not necessary and that independence would be bad for everyone concerned. He retired from the Assembly, and from his law practice. In July, 1779, after Tryon's raid on the Connecticut shoreline burnt down the towns of Fairfield and Norwalk, the panicking citizens of Stratford begged him to intercede with General Tyron and save their town. He declined to undertake yet another dangerous mission he opposed, but a town meeting was called and resolutions were passed insisting he should visit Tyron. A committee was appointed to accompany him, and a subscription paper implying Johnson supported the peace effort was printed without Johnson's approval. The paper was seized on by his political enemies, leading to his arrest for communicating with the enemy, but the charges were soon dropped.

=== New nation ===
Once independence was achieved, Johnson felt free to participate in the government of the new nation. He resumed the practice of his profession, and some time subsequent to the declaration of peace was reinstated in his old office as a member of the Upper House of the General Assembly, where he also served as a legal counsel for Connecticut in its dispute with Pennsylvania over western lands (1779–80). He was appointed as a delegate to the Congress of the Confederation (1785–1787). His influence there was recognized by his contemporaries. Jeremiah Wadsworth wrote of him to a friend, "Dr. Johnson has, I believe, much more influence than either you or myself. The Southern Delegates are vastly fond of him." In 1785, the Vermont Republic granted Johnson a town in the former King's College Tract in thanks for representing the interests of Vermont before the Congress of the Confederation. The town of Johnson, Vermont, the former Johnson State College, and Johnson Street in Madison, Wisconsin bear his name.

=== Constitutional Convention ===
In 1787, Johnson played a major role as one of the Philadelphia Convention's delegates. His eloquent speeches on the subject of representation carried great weight during the debate. He looked to a strong federal government to protect the rights of Connecticut and the other small states from encroachment by their more powerful neighbors. He supported the New Jersey Plan, which called for equal representation of the states in the national legislature.

In general, he favored extension of federal authority. He argued that the judicial power "ought to extend to equity as well as law" (the words "in law and equity" were adopted at his motion). He denied that there could be treason against a separate state since sovereignty was "in the Union." He opposed prohibition of any ex post facto law, which made an act a criminal offense retroactively, because he considered that such a prohibition implied "an improper suspicion of the National Legislature."

Johnson was influential even in the final stages of framing the Constitution. He gave his fullest support to the Connecticut Compromise, which foreshadowed the final Great Compromise, with a national legislature with a Senate that provided equal representation for all states and a House of Representatives based on population. He also served on and chaired the five-member Committee of Style, which framed the final form of the document.

In her 1966 book, Miracle at Philadelphia, Catherine Drinker Bowen calls Johnson "the perfect man to preside over these four masters of argument and political strategy [i.e. fellow committee members Alexander Hamilton, Gouverneur Morris, James Madison, and Rufus King].... His presence on the committee must have been reassuring; the doctor's quiet manner disarmed."

== Sources ==
- United States Congress. "William Samuel Johnson (id: J000182)". Biographical Directory of the United States Congress.
- Graff, Nancy Price. Visible Layers of Time: A Perspective on the History and Architecture of Johnson Vermont. The University of Vermont, Historic Preservation Program: 1990.
- McCaughey, Elizabeth P. "William Samuel Johnson, The Loyal Whig" in William M. Fowler Jr. and Wallace Coyle, eds. American Revolution: Changing Perspectives (1979), pp. 69–102
- Beardsley, E. Edwards. Life and Times of William Samuel Johnson, LL.D. (1876)
- Groce Jr., George C. "William Samuel Johnson A Maker of the Constitution" (1967)

Academic offices
Preceded by George Clinton; Acting	President of Columbia College; 1787–1800	Succeeded by Charles Henry Wharton
U.S. Senate
Preceded by None	U.S. senator (Class 3) from Connecticut; 1789–1791; Served alongside: Oliver Ellsworth	Succeeded by Roger Sherman
Honorary titles
Preceded by None	Oldest living U.S. senator March 4, 1789 – June 13, 1791	Succeeded by Roger Sherman
Preceded by Roger Sherman	Oldest living U.S. senator July 23, 1793 – November 14, 1819	Succeeded by Thomas Sumter
