= Charles Henry Wharton =

President of Columbia University

The Reverend Charles Henry Wharton
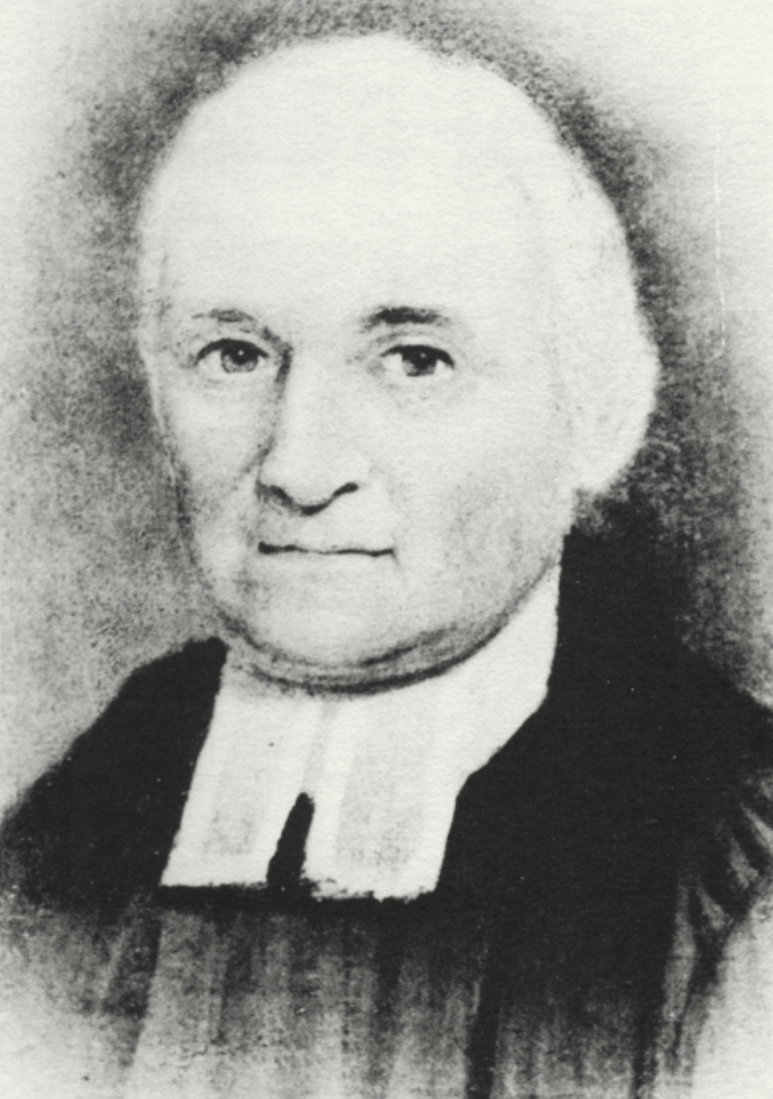

4th President of Columbia University
- In office 1801–1801
- Preceded by: William Samuel Johnson
- Succeeded by: Benjamin Moore

Personal details
- Born: June 5, 1748 St. Mary's County, Maryland
- Died: July 22, 1833 (aged 85) Burlington, New Jersey

Charles Henry Wharton (June 5, 1748 – July 22, 1833), who grew up Catholic and became a Catholic priest, converted to Protestantism and became one of the leading Episcopal clergyman of the early United States, as well as briefly serving as president of Columbia University.

== Early life ==
The family plantation, Notley Hall, was presented to his grandfather by Lord Baltimore. In 1760 he was sent to the English Jesuit College at St Omer, where he was very studious, and became fluent in Latin, so as to even be able to converse in it.

He was ordained deacon in June, 1772, and priest the following September, both in the Roman Catholic Church. At the close of the American Revolution Wharton resided at Worcester, England, as chaplain to the Roman Catholics in that city. There he addressed a poetical epistle to George Washington, with a sketch of his life, which was published for the benefit of American prisoners in England (Annapolis, 1779; London, 1780).

== American ministry ==
Wharton returned to what had become the United States in 1783 in the first vessel that sailed after the peace. In May, 1784, he converted to the Church of England, and published his celebrated "Letter to the Roman Catholics of Worcester" (Philadelphia, 1784), and became rector of Immanuel Church, New Castle, Delaware. Together with the only other remaining Anglican clergyman remaining in the state and several laymen, Rev. Wharton attended the first General Convention that established the Episcopal Church (USA) At that convention, Rev. Wharton served on the committee to "draft an ecclesiastical constitution for the Protestant Episcopal church in the United States", as well as the committees "to prepare a form of prayer and thanksgiving for the Fourth of July", and to Americanize the Book of Common Prayer. In 1786 he was elected a member of the American Philosophical Society.

After ten years' further residence in Delaware, in 1798 Wharton accepted a position as rector of St. Mary's Church, Burlington, New Jersey, where he would serve the rest of his life. Among the leading scholars and most influential clergymen of the early Episcopal Church, Rev. Wharton served as president of the standing committee of the diocese of New Jersey, and several times as a deputy to the General Convention. A gifted poet, as well as an able controversialist, Rev. Wharton also published "Reply to an Address [by Bishop Carroll] to the Roman Catholics of the United States" (Philadelphia, 1785); "Inquiry into the Proofs of the Divinity of Christ" (1796); and "Concise View of the Principal Points of Controversy between the Protestant and Roman Churches" (New York, 1817). In 1813-14 he was co-editor, with Reverend Dr. Abercrombie, of the Quarterly Theological Magazine and Religious Repository. His "Remains," with a memoir, were published by Bishop George W. Doane (2 vols., Philadelphia, 1834).

In 1801 Rev. Wharton accepted the presidency of Columbia College, New York, conditioned upon his ability to also continue his position in Burlington. He was to assume the position at Columbia's August commencement ceremonies, but either failed to appear, or only delivered that commencement oration, for he resigned as Columbia's president by December.

== Death and legacy ==
At the time of his death in 1833, Wharton was the senior presbyter of the Episcopal Church. He is buried in the graveyard of the church he led for 35 years.

Academic offices
Preceded by William Samuel Johnson	President of Columbia College; 1801	Succeeded by Benjamin Moore
