= William Harris (academic) =

American Episcopal priest and academic (1765–1829)

The Reverend William Harris
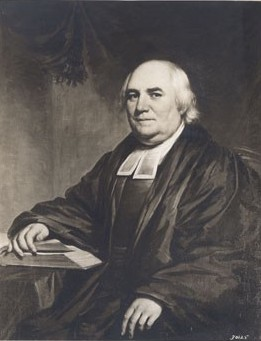

6th President of Columbia University
- In office 1811–1829
- Preceded by: Benjamin Moore
- Succeeded by: William Alexander Duer

Personal details
- Born: April 29, 1765 Springfield, Massachusetts
- Died: October 18, 1829 (aged 64) New York City

William Harris (April 29, 1765 – October 18, 1829), an Episcopal priest, was the sixth president of Columbia College, serving from 1811 to 1829. In a compromise, John Mitchell Mason, a Presbyterian minister who was denied the presidency, became the university's first provost and chief operating officer.

== Early life and education ==
William Harris was born at Springfield, Massachusetts, April 29, 1765. His mother was Sarah, a granddaughter of Wm. Pynchon, the founder of Springfield, and his father Daniel was a deacon in the Congregational Church. Harris graduated from Harvard College in 1786, and he began as a minister, but soon retired due to health issues. He turned to the study of medicine and during that time converted to the Episcopal Church. His health recovered and he rejoined the ministry.

== Academic career ==
After rectoring in Marblehead, Massachusetts, he was made a deacon on October 16, 1791, in Trinity Church, New York, and advanced to the priesthood on the following Sunday in St. George's Chapel. On November 3 of that year he married Martha, the daughter of the Rev. Jonas Clark, of Lexington, Massachusetts. They had seven children.

Harris continued to officiate both as teacher and preacher until 1801, when he received a unanimous call to St. Mark's Church in-the-Bowery to fill the vacancy caused by the death of the Rev. Mr. Callahan. On February 2, 1802, he was inducted as rector. In 1811, Harris was elected president of Columbia College and received the degree of Doctor of Divinity from Harvard and Columbia. At the same time, Dr. John M. Mason, the prominent Presbyterian divine, who had been proposed for the presidency, was made provost, an office created for him and carrying with it some of the administrative duties. This lightening of the president's work enabled Harris to retain the rectorship of St. Mark's until 1816, when the resignation of Dr. Mason gave Harris all the duties of president. He was elected a member of the American Antiquarian Society in 1814.

Harris died at Columbia College, on October 18, 1829, and was buried in a vault at St. Mark's.

== Notes ==
Academic offices
Preceded by Benjamin Moore	President of Columbia University; 1811–1829	Succeeded by William Alexander Duer
