= Myles Cooper =

Anglican priest in colonial New York

The Reverend Myles Cooper
- Portrait of Myles Cooper by John Singleton Copley

2nd President of King's College
- In office 1763–1775
- Preceded by: Samuel Johnson
- Succeeded by: Benjamin Moore (acting)

Personal details
- Born: 1735 England
- Died: 1 May 1785 (aged 49–50) Edinburgh, Scotland
- Education: The Queen's College, Oxford

Myles Cooper (1735 – May 1, 1785) was a figure in colonial New York. An Anglican priest, he served as the President of King's College (predecessor of today's Columbia University) from 1763 to 1775, and was a public opponent of the American Revolution.

== Early life ==
Cooper was educated at The Queen's College, Oxford, where he later served as chaplain. Ordained as a priest in the Church of England in 1761, he attracted the influence of several high clergymen, including Thomas Secker, Archbishop of Canterbury, who recommended him for service in the American colonies. Cooper was thereby sent to New York in 1762 to assist Samuel Johnson, president of King's College, which was an Anglican establishment. Cooper was appointed professor of mental and moral philosophy, and a year later he had assumed the college presidency.

== Presidency of King's College ==
Cooper was chosen to replace his predecessor in the position of College President primarily because the Governors of the institution believed he would be far easier to control. Indeed, Cooper was not entirely engaged in the educational mission of King's, possessing a larger cache of alcoholic beverages than books, and more frequently engaging in the urban life of New York.

Still, the college prospered under Cooper's tenure, creating, among other things, the second medical college in the Americas, in 1767. Judge Thomas Jones wrote that "under his tuition was produced a number of young men superior in learning and ability to any that America had ever before seen," and George Washington, whose stepson John Parke Custis attended King's, wrote of Cooper that he was "a gentleman capable of instructing him [Custis] in every branch of knowledge."

He was elected a Member of the American Philosophical Society in 1769.

== Proposals ==
While in the American colonies Cooper floated several grandiose schemes that were never realized:

=== The American Bishoprics ===
Cooper was reportedly more enamored with the Southern colonies than New York, and frequently took to "rambles" there. Desiring to resettle there, he proposed to his ecclesiastical superiors, in both 1768 and 1774, that two Anglican sees be established in North America, and that he be appointed bishop of the more southernly one.

=== The American University ===
Though he was in the thrall of King's College's governors during much of his tenure, Cooper had novel plans for the fledgling institution. He proposed that the Colonial Colleges be merged into an "American University", the structure of which would be similar to Oxford or Cambridge. Under this scheme, the constituent colleges, including Harvard, Yale, and the College of New Jersey (later Princeton), would remain quasi-independent but would be controlled by King's, which would be elevated to university status and sanctioned as the only degree-granting institution in the colonies. Although Cooper obtained the support of the King's College Governors for the plan and left for England with a delegation to persuade King George III of its virtues and ask for his sanction in the form of a royal charter, neither Parliament nor the governing bodies of the other colleges ever took Cooper's plan seriously.

== Revolution and flight ==
Coat of Arms of Myles Cooper

Cooper, who was a conservative with Tory sympathies, did not take warmly to the growing revolutionary spirit in the colonies. He authored, with several other Anglican clergy in New York, political tracts arguing that all forms of resistance to the Crown constituted treason. His pamphlet A Friendly Address to all Reasonable Americans on our Political Confusions; in which the Necessary Consequences of violently opposing the King's Troops, and of a General Non-importation, are fairly stated was later answered in best-selling tracts by Alexander Hamilton and Charles Lee.

For his Loyalism, Cooper, along with other prominent New York Tories, were issued death threats admonishing them "to flee for your lives, or anticipate your doom". Of Cooper, in particular, this party evidenced a desire of "seizing him in his bed, shaving his head, cutting off his ears, slitting his nose, stripping him naked, and setting him adrift".

In May 1775, Cooper was confronted by an angry mob from which he managed to escape by boarding a British naval ship anchored in New York harbor. Rumors persist that this was due to the assistance of Alexander Hamilton, though the underlying evidence does not strongly support the claim. Cooper fled to England that same month, where he engaged in numerous professions. His only subsequent association to America was his claim that he was owed pay for his tenure as college president, as well as a poem he composed about his flight.

Cooper died in Edinburgh, Scotland in 1785.

Academic offices
Preceded by Samuel Johnson	President of King's College; 1763–1775	Succeeded by Benjamin Moore; Acting
