= Jamaica Women's Club =

Club in Queens, New York

The Jamaica Women's Club was a women's club that was formed in November 1888 for the purpose of “diffusing botanical knowledge” through the presentation and discussion of papers.

== History ==
The seminal meetings were held at the home of Mrs. Mabel Smith who lived on Fulton Street in Jamaica, Queens. In 1900 the club moved its meetings to the 1st floor of the east room at King Manor. The Club also provided a community for women to meet and be entertained. As the membership grew, the objective changed to include the betterment of society and to “promote a generous public spirit in the community.” With this change in objective more activities and departments such as literature, music philanthropy, etc. were added. Being involved in the community "set the stage for later participation by women in politics." For over one hundred years the Club provided means for the women of Jamaica to entertain and educate themselves, and also provide community outreach. The combined factors of low membership, poor parking facilities, and an inability to achieve the Club's stated goals contributed to the dissolution of the Club in 1993. The Club's records are held by Queens Archive at Queens Library.
