= King Manor =

Historic house in Queens, New York

- U.S. National Register of Historic Places
- U.S. National Historic Landmark
- New York State Register of Historic Places
- New York City Landmark
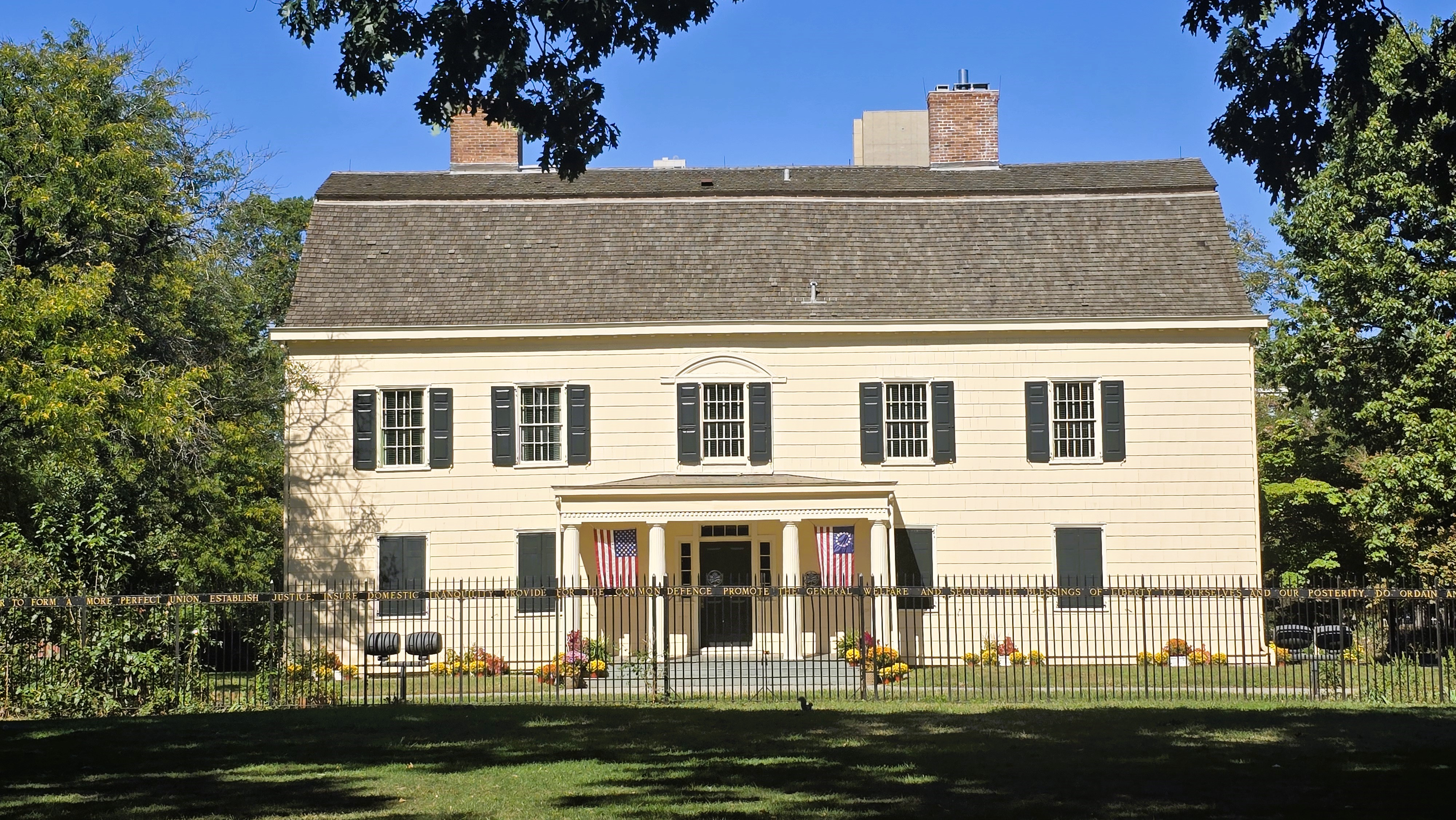
- Interactive map of King Manor
- Location: 150-03 Jamaica Avenue, Jamaica, Queens, New York
- Coordinates: 40°42′11″N 73°48′14″W
- Area: 11.5 acres (4.7 ha) (park)
- Built: c. 1730, 1755, 1805–1810
- Architectural style: Georgian
- NRHP reference No.: 74001295
- NYSRHP No.: 08101.000011
- NYCL No.: 0145, 0923

Significant dates
- Added to NRHP: December 2, 1974
- Designated NHL: December 2, 1974
- Designated NYSRHP: June 23, 1980
- Designated NYCL: April 19, 1966 (exterior); March 23, 1976 (interior)

King Manor, also known as the Rufus King House, is a historic house at 150th Street and Jamaica Avenue in Jamaica, Queens, New York City. The two-story house is the main structure in Rufus King Park, an 11.5-acre (4.7 ha) public park that preserves part of the former estate of Rufus King, a U.S. Founding Father. Built c. 1730 and expanded in 1755 and the 1800s, the house is designed with elements of the Federal, Georgian, and Greek Revival styles. The house is designated as a National Historic Landmark, and the house, its interior spaces, and the park are all New York City designated landmarks.

The house was occupied by the Colgan and Smith families in the late 18th century. King acquired the house and surrounding land in 1805 and expanded it into a 17-room mansion, which he occupied until his death in 1827. King's family lived in the house until 1896 when Rufus's granddaughter Cornelia King died. The house and the remnants of King's land were sold in 1897 to the then-independent village of Jamaica and converted into a public park; when Jamaica became part of New York City the next year, the New York City Parks Department (NYC Parks) took over the property. The King Manor Association renovated the mansion in 1900 and reopened it as a clubhouse for various local civic groups. King Park underwent several alterations in the early and mid-20th century, and there were numerous unexecuted plans to demolish the mansion or convert it to other uses. The house itself was renovated after a major fire in 1964, and the house and park were again restored in the late 1980s and early 1990s. Additional, smaller renovations of the house and park took place in the early 21st century.

What is now King Manor is composed of several sections, arranged roughly in an "L" shape. The facade is slightly asymmetrical, with frame shingles and a Dutch portico, and is topped by a gambrel roof. The rooms largely date to when Rufus King renovated and expanded the house in the early 19th century. The first floor includes an ornate parlor, library, and dining room, while the second and third floors include bedrooms. King Manor is owned and maintained by the New York City Department of Parks and Recreation, and its interior furnishings are supervised by the King Manor Association. The house's collection includes objects from the 18th and 19th centuries, and it has hosted various programs, events, and exhibits over the years. There has been commentary about both the museum's exhibits and the house's plain architecture.

== Site ==
King Manor is located at 150-03 Jamaica Avenue (originally Fulton Street), within Rufus King Park, in the Jamaica neighborhood of Queens in New York City. It is on the north side of the avenue between 150th and 153rd Streets.

=== Rufus King Park ===
The house is the main attraction of Rufus King Park, which occupies a city block bounded by Jamaica Avenue to the south, 150th Street to the west, 89th Avenue to the north, and 153rd Street to the east. The park covers 11.5 acres (4.7 ha) and preserves a portion of the former estate of Rufus King, one of the Founding Fathers of the United States. It has been cited as measuring 552 by 892 feet (168 by 272 m) across. The park has numerous recreational facilities. At the north end of the park is a gazebo, a soccer field, and basketball courts. There is a play area on the eastern end of the park near 153rd Street and 90th Avenue. The south end of Rufus King Park includes the mansion itself and public restrooms. Also within the park, about 100 feet (30 m) north of the mansion, is the reported gravesite of a 19th-century slave known as Duke.

=== Previous site usage ===
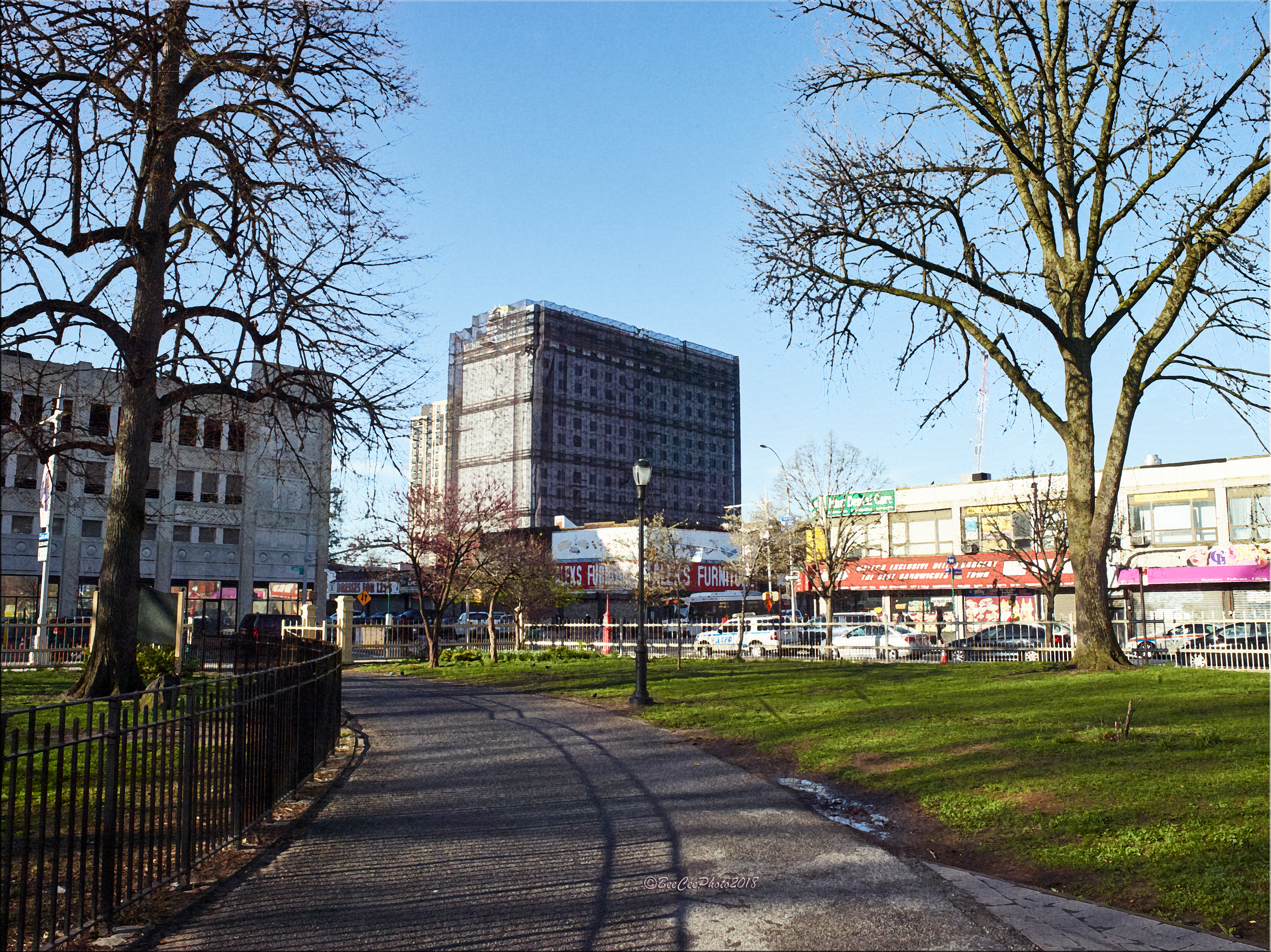
The intersection of 150th Street and Jamaica Avenue as seen from Rufus King Park

Prior to the European colonization of Long Island in the 17th century, the island was occupied by Native Americans, though there exists no evidence of Native American settlement on the house's site. The current park site was located between a group of hills named the Woody Heights to the north and Mechawanienck Trail (which later became Jamaica Avenue) to the south. The first documented structure on or near King Manor's site was a quartering house, which appeared in a 1666 map. According to researcher Jo Ann Cotz, the presence of a chimney and large foundation indicate that this structure may have been used by the British military, but researcher Joel Grossman writes that the nearby huts used by British soldiers were different in design from the quartering house. A leathermaker named John Owlffield bought the land in 1664; the grounds may contain remnants of trenches that he used to soak animal hides. Though it is unknown whether Owlffield's holdings included the King Manor site itself, his descendants, the Oldfield family, did own property that became part of King Manor.

There may have been several outbuildings associated with King Manor, although the locations of the outbuildings are not all known. A structure east of the main house, dating from the early 19th century, may have been used as a bathroom. Nothing is known about older outbuildings from as early as the 17th century. Among the buildings that might have existed were a cistern; a well; an outhouse building or privy vault; and structures related to farming. After the King family moved to the site in the 19th century, several structures are known to have been built near the house. By 1813, these included a pair of parallel 50-by-75-foot (15 by 23 m) buildings north of the house, as well as a third structure that was built near Grove Street (now a walkway at 90th Avenue). In addition, there was a stone edifice known as building K to the east of the manor's rear wing, which may have been used as a barracks, dairy house, or smokehouse. In the 1900s, building K was a milk house, connected to the main house with latticework.

== Use as residence ==
=== 18th century ===
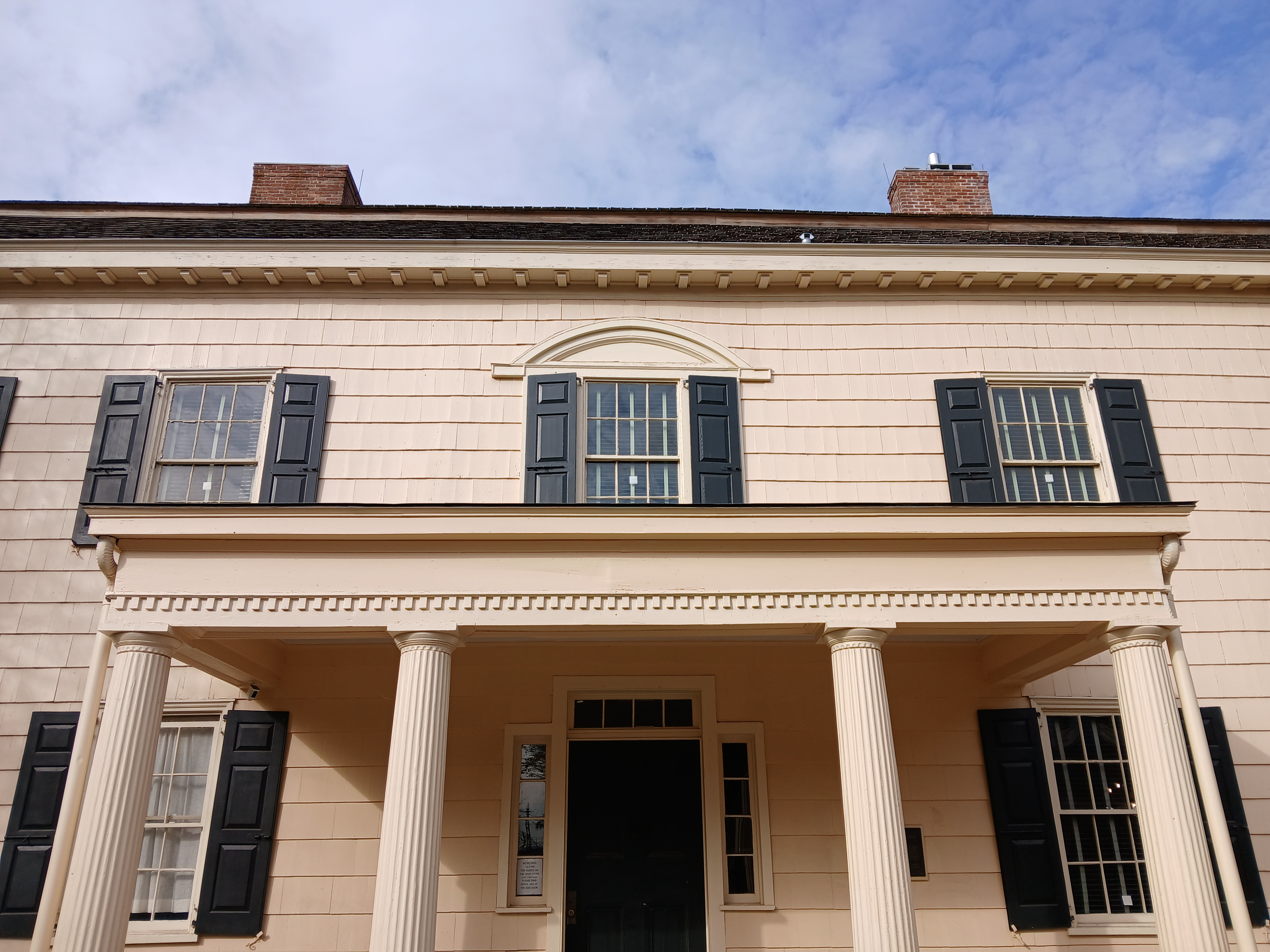
Main entrance to the original house

It is not known when the oldest section of the house was built. According to research by Robert W. Venables in 1989, there was already a small cottage on the grounds by 1730. The cottage's original location has also not been determined, but that residence was likely moved at some point and is preserved as the current house's original kitchen. Other sources date King Manor to 1750, although the New York City Landmarks Preservation Commission (LPC) cites the western half of the house as having been built at that time. In any case, the original section of the house served as a farmhouse, inn, and rectory in the 18th century. One writer, Richard Panchyk, credits Ames Smith as having built the house.

Two rectors of Grace Episcopal Church lived on the land in the early and mid-18th century: Thomas Poyer and Thomas Colgan. Thomas Poyer married Sarah Oldfield in 1724 and acquired a 53-acre (21 ha) farm from his father-in-law, Joseph Oldfield, in 1726. Poyer remained there until his death in 1732; he was recorded as having owned 50 acres (20 ha) or 53 acres (21 ha) of land in what was then the town of Jamaica. Poyer sold off some of the land in 1730. Thomas Colgan, the next person to live on the land, bought Poyer's farm and acquired a 16-acre (6.5 ha) site in Jamaica, bringing his total holdings to 66 acres (27 ha). Colgan lived on the estate until his death in 1755. According to Venables, Colgan may have built the western half of what later became King Manor. He also likely expanded Poyer's original structure to the north. A later pastor for Grace Church wrote that the farm was surrounded by a fence and included a fruit orchard that was capable of producing 100 barrels of cider annually. His estate, at the time, faced the shore of the now-infilled Beaver Pond.

The Colgan house was characterized as having "eight rooms on a floor, and two good rooms upstairs" in the mid-18th century, although Venables described the house as having four rooms per floor. The house was described as having sash windows that overlooked Beaver Pond; this indicates that the house has likely always faced south, since Beaver Pond was to the southwest. Around this time, the main house's western half was built. Colgan's widow placed the house on sale in 1759, and she was living in another house in Jamaica by 1765. Mrs. Colgan died in the house on April 17, 1776.

The house passed to Colgan's son-in-law Christopher Smith, who was married to Mary, one of the Colgan daughters. Although there was a common misconception that George Washington once slept in the house, he never visited it; however, Washington is known to have visited a neighboring tavern. Smith bought land from the Sayre family in 1781 and from Ann Banks in 1785. The Colgan and Smith families may have owned up to 10 slaves on the estate, as recorded in the 1790 and 1800 United States censuses. Little else is known about the Smith family's occupancy of the house. When Christopher Smith died in 1805, he was indebted to the estate of the politician John Alsop, who had given Smith a mortgage for the house.

=== Rufus King ownership ===
Rufus King, who was Alsop's son-in-law, was the next person to own the Colgans' and Smiths' house. King had been a Continental Congress delegate and a United States Senator before becoming the United States Minister to the United Kingdom from 1796 to 1803. He and his wife Mary had moved in 1788 to New York City (which at the time excluded Jamaica), but he wanted to move to the countryside by the start of the 19th century, having lived in rural England for several years. After surveying several plots along the Long Island Sound and Hudson River, King decided to move to Jamaica on central Long Island. Just before King occupied the house, there were a narrow gravel path and a carriage driveway leading to Jamaica Avenue, and there were two horse chestnut trees and a white picket fence separating the house from the avenue. There were no other flora on the property aside from a grove of apple trees. One of King's grandsons, Charles King, wrote that the house, fences, and land were similar to those in other residences in Jamaica.

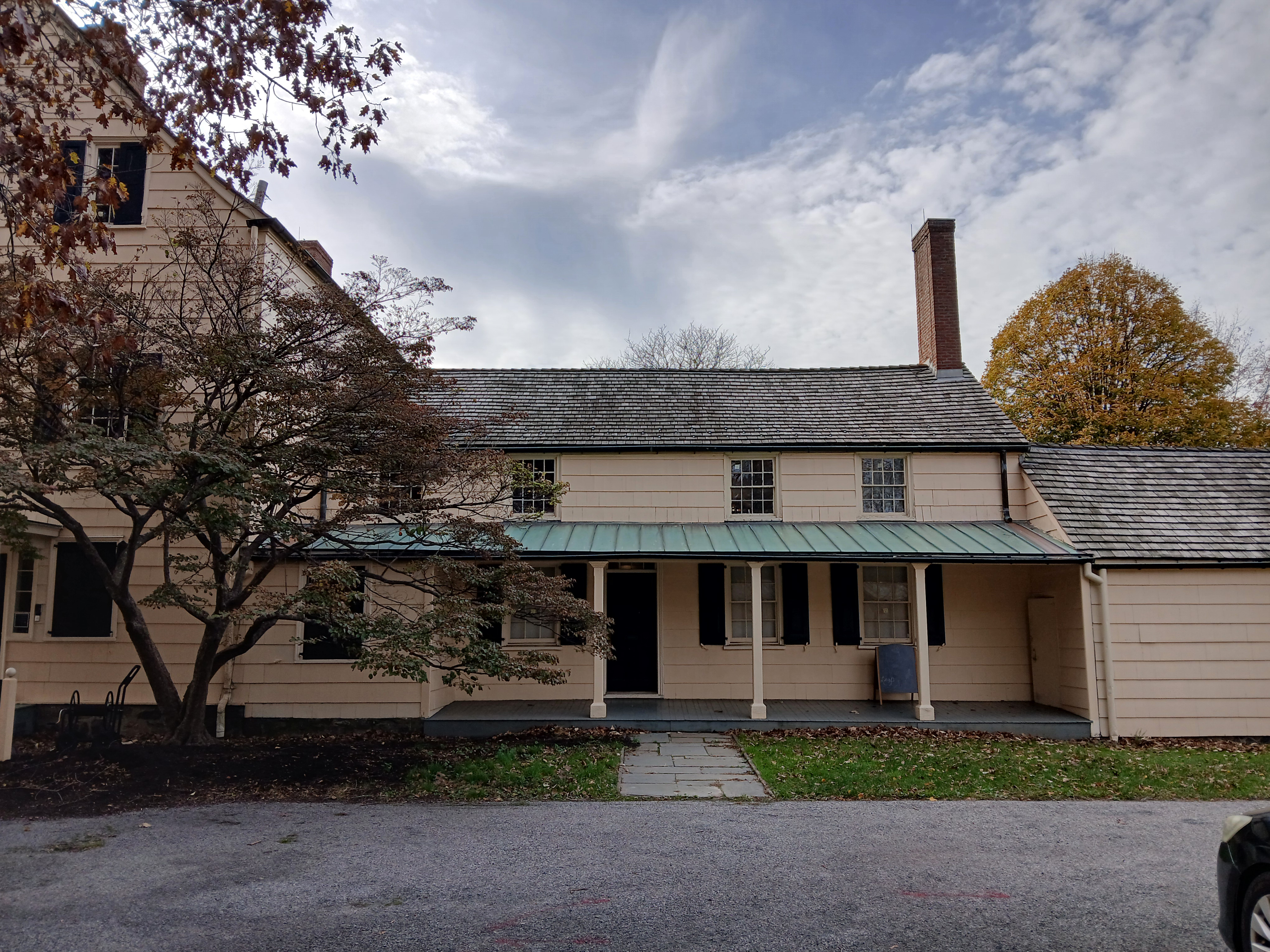
The rear wing seen from the east, connecting with the kitchen

King purchased Christopher Smith's house and 90 acres (36 ha) in 1805 for $12,000, (Note: Venables describes the estate as covering as much as 90 acres (36 ha), including the 59 acres (24 ha) farm and an adjacent 31 acres (13 ha) forest. In a letter to one of his sons, King wrote that the estate covered 50 acres (20 ha). Geismar 2016, p. 1., which uses the smaller 50-acre figure, stated the estate was later increased to 69 acres (28 ha).) and he also paid off Smith's mortgage. The site extended as far north as the present-day Grand Central Parkway and abutted Grace Church to the east. King moved into the house in early 1806 and shortly afterward began expanding it into a mansion. In front of the house, he built a circular front walkway, some fir and pine trees, and a strip of plantings measuring 20 to 30 feet (6.1 to 9.1 m) wide. King also planted a semicircular row of linden trees behind the house; some of the trees were transported from Portsmouth, New Hampshire. According to Venables's research, King obtained pine and oak from the nearby forest, as well as shingles from a nearby property owner, and used these materials to build a new kitchen in 1806. (Note: Grossman 1991, pp. 7–8, writes that King's kitchen was built behind the eastern section of the house but that Colgan had already built a kitchen there in the mid-18th century. Matthews 2011, pp. 71–72 shows King's kitchen as being located north of Colgan's structure.) King also erected the eastern portion of the main house. The interiors were redesigned in the Federal and Georgian styles; by 1810, the dining room had been expanded, and the new kitchen had been finished. The original cottage had been moved to behind the main house by this time, creating the current L-shaped layout. (Note: Grossman 1991, p. 8, writes that Venables cited the Poyer cottage as having been moved during either Colgan's or King's ownership.) There were two buildings north of the mansion, which may have been barns. There was also a lawn to the west of the main house.

King was an abolitionist and paid his workers, in contrast to the slaveowners in the surrounding area. The 1810 United States census shows that he had a slave named Margaret, whom he freed two years later. The New York Amsterdam News said he bought Margaret to free her from the estate of a friend who had died, while Newsday wrote that King had wanted to reunite Margaret with her husband Moses, a free man who worked as King's servant. There were unfounded rumors that King buried slaves on the grounds and used the mansion as a plantation. Under the mansion's previous owners, slaves may have lived behind building K to the east of the main house; by contrast, King's servants likely worked in the lean-to at the north end of the new kitchen, as well as fields and barns north of the main house. King served again as a U.S. senator from 1813 to 1825 and continued to own the house. Additional structures on the property were built after 1813, though it is unknown exactly when these structures were erected. The King estate also had a cistern at an unknown location.

=== Later King family ownership ===
Rufus King died at the mansion on April 29, 1827, and was buried beside his wife in Grace Churchyard, Jamaica. The manor was inherited by his firstborn son, John Alsop King, who would later serve as a state legislator, U.S. Representative, and then the governor of New York. The land continued to serve as a functional farm through the mid-19th century. By 1842, several outbuildings had been developed east and north of the main house. According to Grossman, a map from that time shows 11 structures surrounding the house. Except for a group of buildings to the north of what is now 90th Avenue (formerly Grove Street), the estate saw few other modifications from 1842 to 1868. John King died at the mansion on July 8, 1867, and John's widow continued to live in the mansion until her own death.

During the late 19th century, the farm gradually declined. Cornelia King, the youngest daughter of John King, was the last King family member to live in King Manor. The surrounding land was parceled off during the 1880s. Atlases from 1895 and 1897 indicate that all except one outbuilding, namely building H, had been demolished. Cornelia continued to live primarily at the family's estate until she died in 1896 at the age of 73.

After Cornelia's death, her brother John A. King was offered $700,000 for the house but refused to take the offer. By then, the village was experiencing rapid development, but several of its old estates remained standing. King Manor's old gardens still remained intact, even though the estate itself was a fraction of its original size. Some of the Kings' belongings were donated to the New-York Historical Society in the early 1900s. Several local newspapers endorsed selling the King estate to the village of Jamaica and converting the grounds to a public park; one newspaper wrote that "the dwelling, although unpretentious, is famous and interesting from its historical associations".

== Use as park and museum ==
=== Acquisition of land for park ===
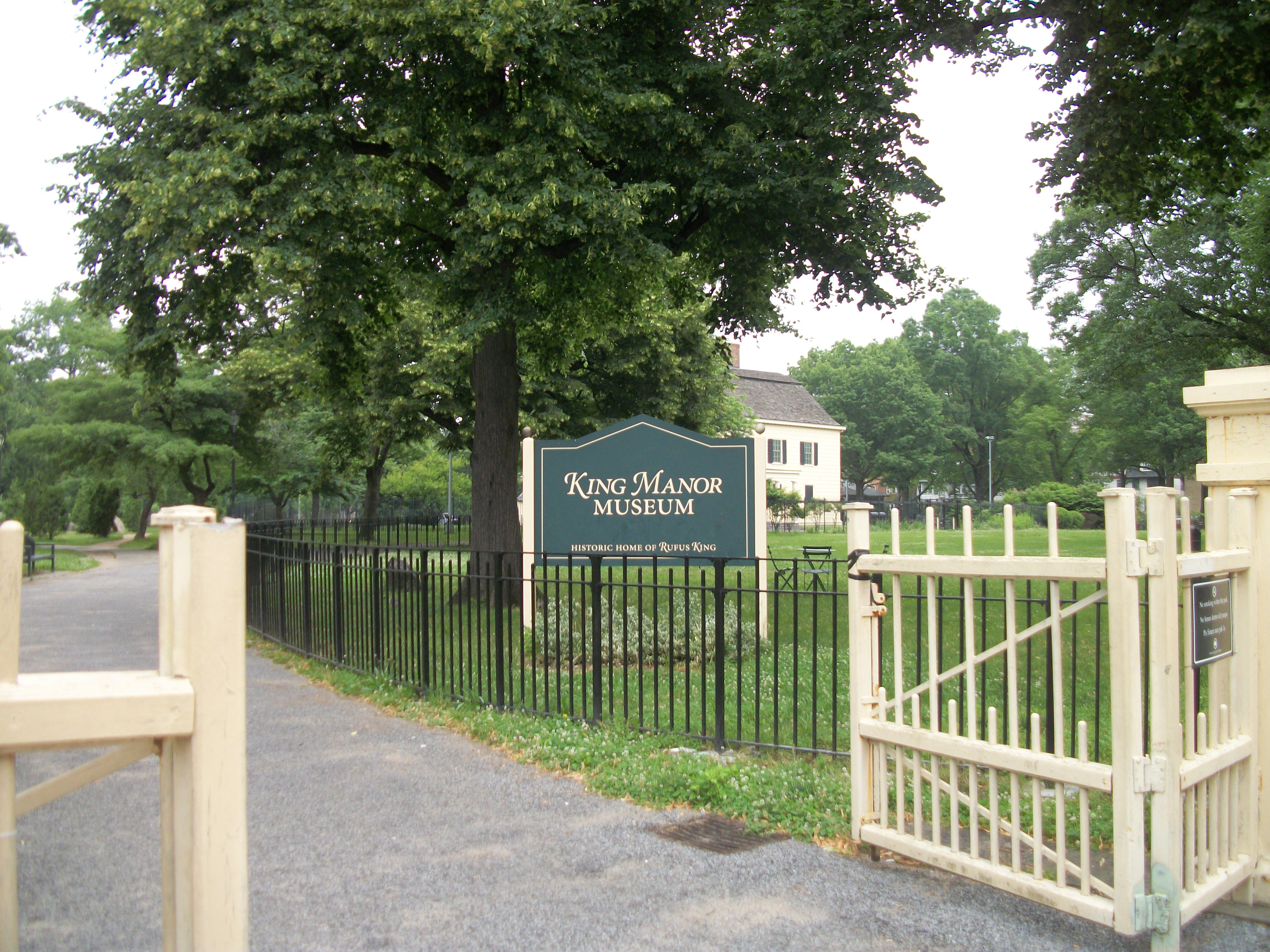
Western entrance to the park

By 1897, the residents of Jamaica were in favor of buying the remnants of the King estate. John A. King offered the land to the village of Jamaica for $50,000, a discount compared with the market-rate value of the site. The town's trustees held a vote to decide whether bonds should be raised to acquire the site, and residents voted to buy the land on June 29, 1897. The plot was bounded by modern-day 150th Street, 89th Avenue, 153rd Street, and Jamaica Avenue. (Note: The plot was described as being bounded by Ray Street to the east, Fulton Street to the south, Alsop Street to the west, and Shelton Avenue to the north. All four of these streets have since been renamed: Shelton Avenue: modern-day 89th Avenue; Ray Street: modern-day 153rd Street; Fulton Street: modern-day Jamaica Avenue; Alsop Street: modern-day 150th Street) A group of citizens immediately sued the trustees to annul the bond issue. Nonetheless, the village trustees acquired the land on July 9 and opened it to the public; they also appointed a policeman to serve as the house's live-in caretaker. A New York Supreme Court justice enjoined the trustees from spending money on the park's upkeep, but the Appellate Division reversed this injunction. The park was officially renamed Jamaica Park in October 1897 and served briefly as a town park. The house's preservation, which occurred long before the historic preservation movement in New York gained momentum, was uncommon for the time.

Jamaica was annexed to the City of Greater New York at the beginning of 1898, becoming part of the borough of Queens, and the New York City Parks Department (NYC Parks) took over the house and land. The park was renamed King Park. During mid-1898, there were proposals to use the mansion as offices for several city agencies. These included a New York City Police Department (NYPD) precinct, offices for borough officials, and the Queens headquarters of the New York City Board of Education. The Brooklyn Daily Eagle reported in April 1899 that the house was inhabited by a single janitor and had no offices. New York City park commissioner George V. Brower and a local landscape artist were planning to restore the mansion and grounds by 1899. This involved cutting down dead trees, installing new plantings, and adding furniture. There were concerns that the house would be demolished.

=== Clubhouse conversion and 1900s ===
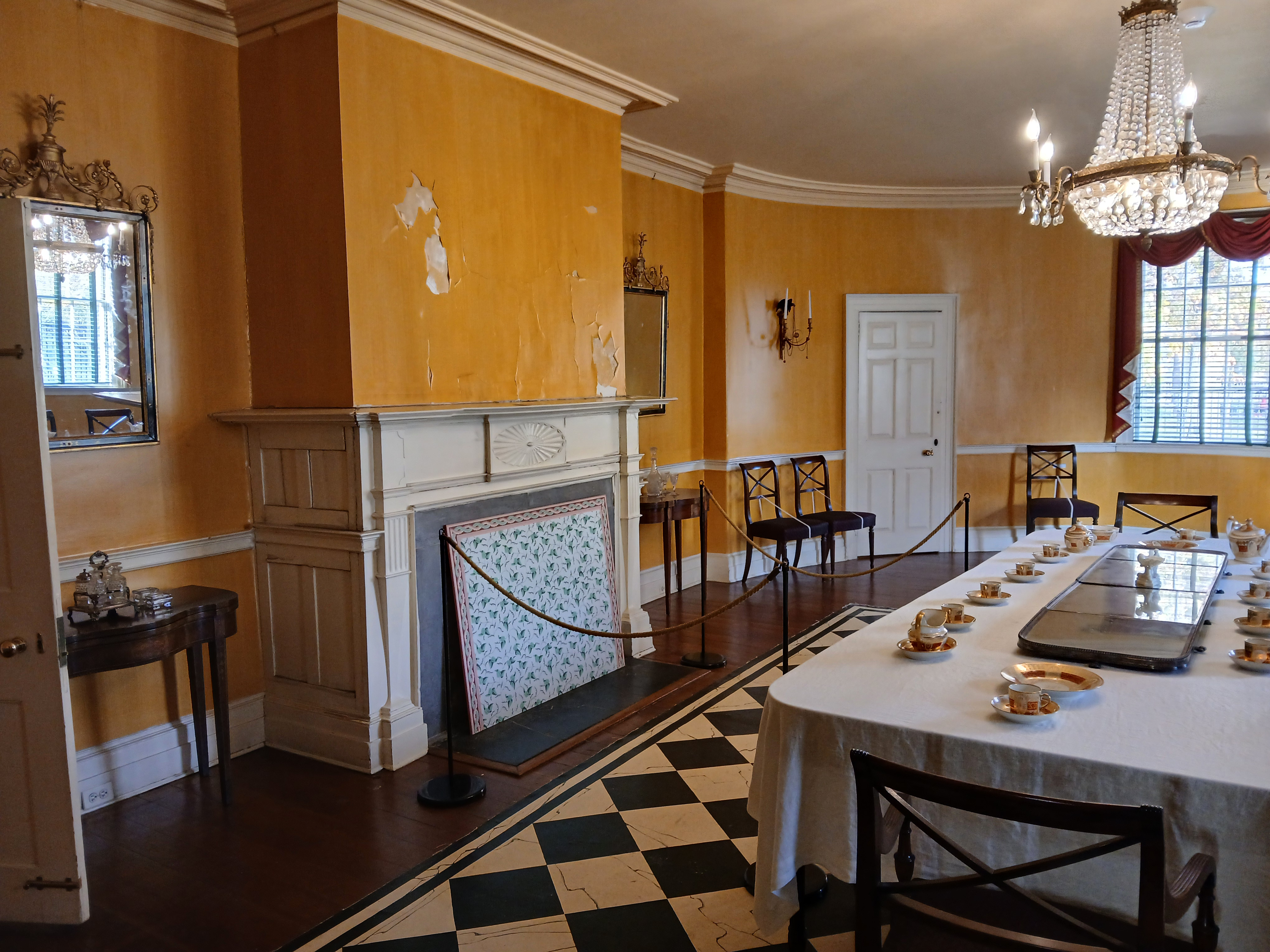
Interior of the house's dining room

Local women, led by Mary E. Craigie, were pushing to convert King's mansion into a clubhouse for local groups by early 1900. Brower expressed support for the idea. The King Manor Association (KMA) had been formed by February 1900, and it set up various committees to manage various aspects of the house. By March, the Daughters of the American Revolution (DAR), the Jamaica Women's Club, and the Brooklyn Public Library Association planned to refurbish the first-floor rooms, although this was delayed because a furnace in the mansion had to be repaired first. The group hosted its first meeting at the house in May 1900. The KMA signed a three-year lease for the house that June and shortly began making plans to convert the house into a headquarters for local clubs. The KMA requested "furniture, pictures, books, and what not" to furnish the house, which was also used to store heirlooms. In addition, the KMA planned to open the house to the public one day a week. Brooklyn Life magazine wrote that the conversion of King Manor into a clubhouse was "doubly gratifying", as many of western Long Island's old structures were being demolished.

The first social meeting in the house took place in October 1900. One source described the renovated first floor as having a green-and-white hallway with mahogany finishes; a tan-and-white drawing room; and a dark-red library. The dining room, the largest in the manor, was used as a meeting room. Several civic clubs moved into the mansion, (Note: These included the Jamaica Women's Club, Brooklyn Public Library Association, the Daughters of the Revolution, the Daughters of the American Revolution, the Society of Colonial Daughters of the Seventeenth Century, the Alumnae Association of the Girls' High School of Brooklyn, and the Queens Borough Musical Society.) and other groups expressed interest in using the house and renovating other rooms. The KMA received its certificate of incorporation in December 1900; it had over 200 members, while the house's clubs had a combined membership of 1,000. In addition, a caretaker lived in the rear annexes. Although the KMA sought to sign a long-term lease for the house, the park commissioners had no authority to sign a lease that expired after the commissioners left office. Water and sewer pipes were installed starting in 1902, and building K, the former outbuilding, was converted into a restroom by the next year. The KMA also wanted to restore the mansion's interior, roof, and porches and repaint the facade; this work was completed by 1903. The Brooklyn Citizen said the same year that the park suffered from poor upkeep. In its first decade, King Park was re-landscaped and hosted numerous concerts during the summer.

The New York City government considered erecting a Carnegie library on the site of King Manor in late 1902, though local residents opposed the Carnegie library. The city also considered building an annex to the house for the library, which would not be eligible for Carnegie funds; the library plans were voted down in mid-1903. The same year, the Long Island Society of the Daughters of the Revolution restored the house's parlor. The KMA agreed in 1904 to maintain the house's interior and furnishings, while NYC Parks agreed to maintain the surrounding site as a park. The house was open to the public on Mondays; it recorded thirteen hundred annual visitors in 1904 and two thousand visitors by 1906. Clubs met on the first and second floors, and there was also a display of furniture and antiquities on the second floor. The Brooklyn Times-Union said in 1907 that the house's value had increased sixfold in ten years. There were also plans to move Queens' borough hall to King Park by the late 1900s, and paths were built in the park toward the end of that decade.

=== 1910s and 1920s ===
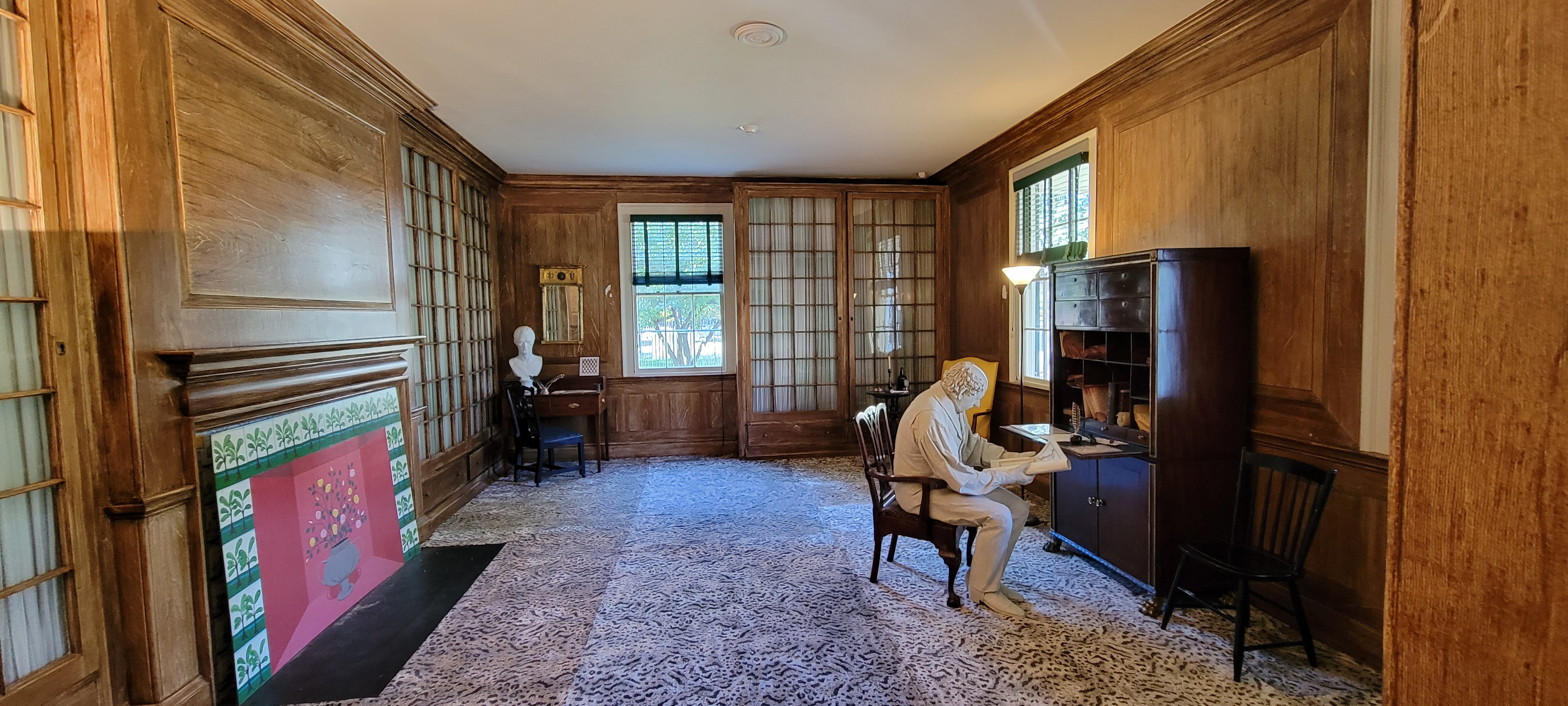
Library room in King Manor

By 1911, Queens park commissioner Walter G. Elliott planned to convert the house into a regional headquarters for NYC Parks, but the parks department's office was relocated after the KMA protested. The KMA began restoring the house that same year; a fence was installed around King Park; and NYC Parks set aside $10,000 for a new bathroom in the park. Although a contractor for the bathroom was selected in 1912, the contractor withdrew from the contract, and a second round of bidding was unsuccessful. NYC Parks cleaned up the grounds in 1913, and the KMA began allowing visitors into the house three days a week in late 1914. Also in 1914, the Board of Estimate provided $5,000 for the construction of a bandstand and restroom. The bandstand in King Park opened in June 1915, and the restroom in building K was renovated and partitioned around the same year. Additional clubs had space at the house during the late 1910s, including the National Surgical Dressings Committee and the DAR's Rufus King Chapter.

Two cedar trees from former U.S. president Theodore Roosevelt's estate, Sagamore Hill, were planted in front of the house in 1919. In September 1920, the Queens Borough Public Library's board of trustees John Leich proposed moving the library's Jamaica branch into King Manor, saying there were no other suitable buildings for the library branch. This prompted opposition from several civic groups led by the DAR's King chapter, and the KMA received numerous letters speaking out against the library plan. Leich withdrew his plan to use the house in February 1921 due to widespread opposition; the library had already identified an alternate location. When a children's shelter was proposed inside the house in May 1921, civic groups objected even more strongly, calling the plan a "menace". Pratt Institute artisans also took wood from an old oak tree on the grounds and turned it into three gavels, which were presented to the DAR, KMA, and American Scenic and Historic Preservation Society in 1921.

Free concerts were given in King Park through the 1920s and proved popular. An unidentified building was erected in the park in 1922; records for this structure are incomplete. One of King Manor's rooms was re-furnished for the Jamaica Village Society during 1923 or 1924, and the society used that room to display documents, manuscripts, and other artifacts from 19th-century Jamaica. King Manor was one of the few colonial-era mansions in Jamaica by the 1920s, even as the surrounding neighborhood had changed. NYC Parks again solicited bids for the replacement of King Park's bathroom starting in 1927–1928, but this bidding process was prolonged through at least 1930. During the late 1920s, the Jamaica Center of Commerce also proposed constructing tennis courts in the park.

=== 1930s to 1970s ===
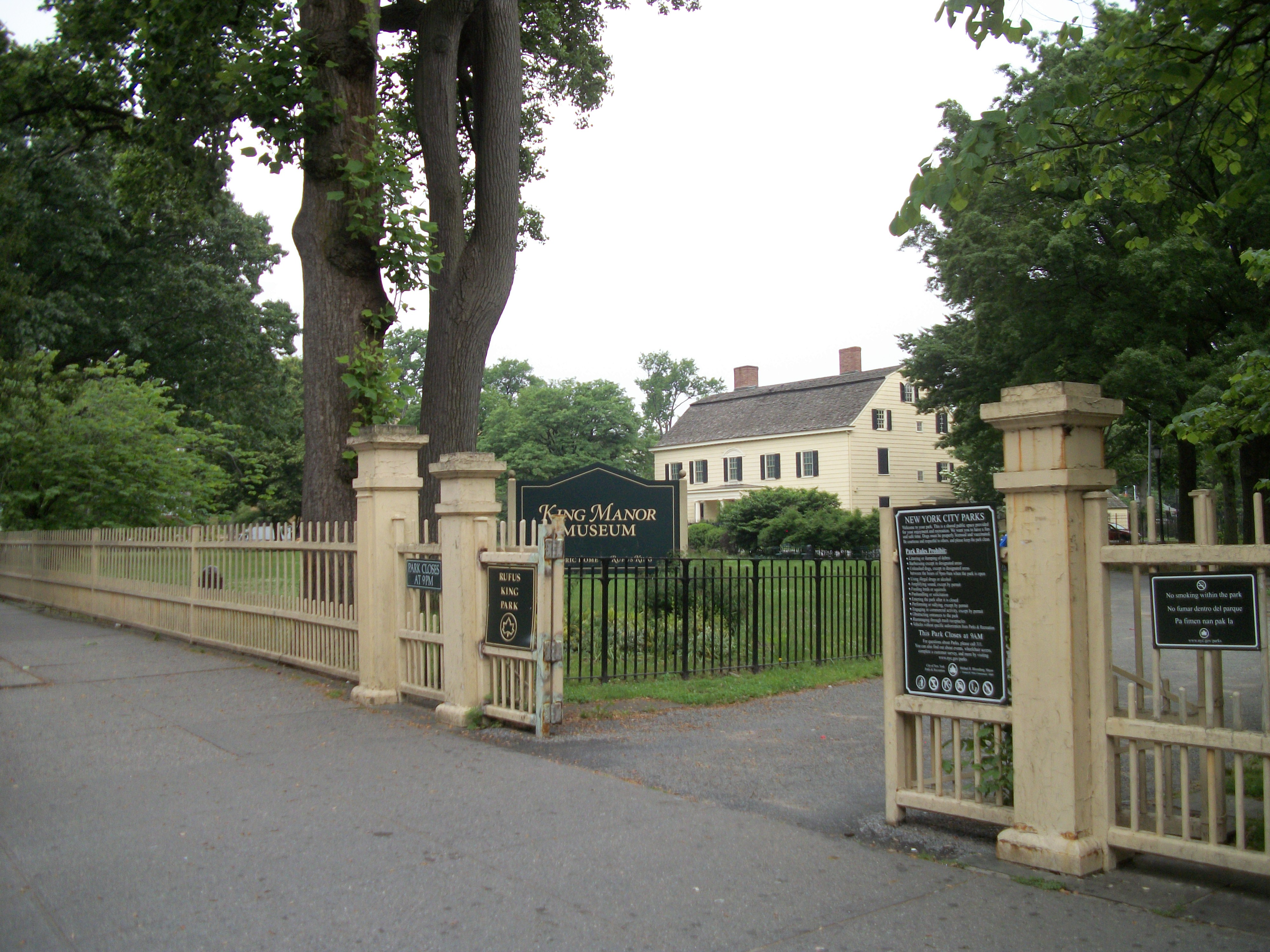
The southeastern entrance to the park and house on Jamaica Avenue

A civic center was proposed in King Park in 1930, and local businessman George Jones proposed constructing four 10-story government buildings surrounding King Manor. The KMA vigorously opposed the plan, which was postponed for several years. NYC Parks began installing electric lighting, heating, and plumbing in the house in 1931. The new bathroom, east of building K, was completed in 1935. Queens County clerk Jenkin R. Hockert again recommended constructing the civic center at the northern end of King Park in 1936, saying that the parcel was the only suitable site in the neighborhood for a courthouse and that the northern part of the park, which had no playground, was a suitable location. Officials quickly dismissed the plan, citing a lack of parkland in the neighborhood. At the time, the park was cited as having a cannon, flagpole, bandstand, and the new comfort station, in addition to the mansion. The Jamaica Women's Society decided to move into the house in 1936 and renovate a room for itself. The New York City government planted tulips at King Park in 1939, part of a gift of one million tulips from the Dutch government, but King Park's tulips died within a year due to poisoning.

The mansion underwent further renovations in the early 1940s as part of a program to restore historical sites across the city. The Long Island Daily Press reported in 1943 that the house had 1,000 visitors every month. When the house was open to the public, two members of the KMA (one each on the first and second floors) showed visitors around. The home remained open three days a week in the 1950s and the 1960s. A playground and basketball court were built just east of King Manor in 1957, on the site of a building that had been demolished more than a century earlier. By the early 1960s, the roof of the house was being reshingled, and floodlights were installed in the adjacent park.

The house was severely damaged in March 1964 by a fire that began on its first floor, which was likely caused by faulty wiring. Two rooms were destroyed by the fire, and there was smoke and water damage throughout the house. Officials first estimated that it would cost $39,000 to restore the exterior and grounds and $20,000 to restore the interior, but an expert determined that the interior would cost $50,000 to restore after visiting the house. Restoration of the mansion was completed in 1966, funded by donations from various sources.

A group of teenagers set fire to the house's porch in 1973, but passersby noticed the fire before any major damage occurred. The house was open on Thursdays during the late 1970s, and the KMA had further restored the house's interiors by then. By then, the surrounding park was popular among students at York College and visitors to the Queens Supreme Courthouse (both of which were nearby). The area was also a frequent hangout for drug addicts, as there was a drug treatment center near King Park. The park's benches were repaired in the late 1970s, and the NYPD cracked down on illicit drug sales in the park during the same time. In 1979, the King Manor Association raised $10,000 for a trust fund for King Mansion, which was to be complemented by $10,000 in matching funds from the city government. The association also had an operating fund of $1,800 and wished to conduct a study of the house.

=== 1980s and 1990s ===
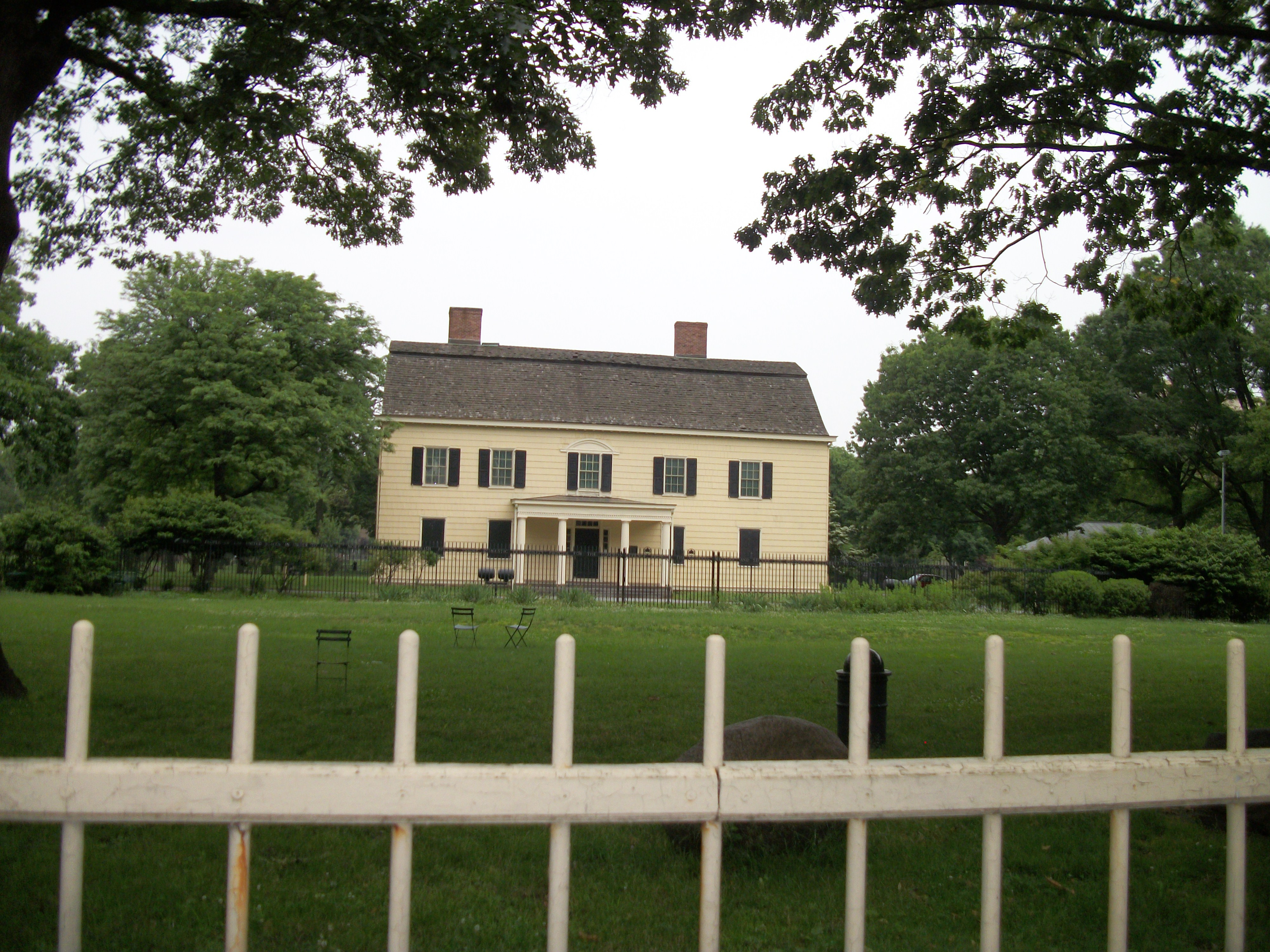
King Manor as seen from behind King Park's fence

A group of architects inspected the house in 1980 and found that, although some parts of the exterior were deteriorating, the mansion was largely in good condition. A consortium of women's organizations advocated for the New York City government to renovate the house after observing deterioration there. The house and surrounding park also experienced periodic vandalism and other crimes during that time, and the park had degraded to such an extent that one critic wrote that "King Park, for all its beauty, has become Junk Park". City Council member Sheldon S. Leffler requested funding for the house's renovation in 1983, and the city provided $500,000 for design in June 1984. The city initially provided $1.31 million for the renovation of the mansion in March of that year and added $3.6 million for the park that September. Designs for the renovation were completed by the end of the year. The KMA also obtained $500,000 in city funds for new furnishings and $80,000 in private funds for new exhibits. A group of restorers discovered several artifacts in the house and park during an archeological dig in 1985. By that time, the restoration of King Park and Manor was estimated to cost $1.9 million.

In March 1987, the New York City government began renovating King Manor. This project was to include new mechanical and electrical systems; security and fire-prevention features; repainting; and restoration of decorations and surfaces. The mansion's renovation involved repainting the rooms their original colors, and the park was also to receive a new bandstand and bathroom. Huff Enterprises, Arista Heating, Action Electric, and Calco Plumbing and Heating were hired to carry out the work on the mansion. The house was shuttered entirely except for monthly tours, and homeless people occasionally burglarized the house, which was also used for police stakeouts. The renovation of King Manor was one of several major projects underway in downtown Jamaica at the time. In conjunction with these projects, the NYPD focused on making King Park a drug-free zone during the late 1980s.

King Manor was one of the founding members of the Historic House Trust, established in 1989, and the city gave $28,000 for programs at the mansion the same year. Roy Fox, a former radio host who was looking for a place to live, became the house's caretaker in 1989 after learning about a rent-free apartment from his wife's supervisor. He and his wife Mary moved into the third floor and gave unofficial tours of the house, including their apartment. At the beginning of 1990, work commenced on the park itself, and researchers also began archeological studies of the manor site. The work included a relocation of the bandstand and new benches, paths, and fences. Although the New York Daily News reported that July that the house was open one day a week, Newsday said three years later that the house was open only for scheduled events. Continued renovations were hindered by a lack of funds as well as archeological digs. Museum officials developed a plan for the house's programming in 1991 after the Andy Warhol Foundation and J. M. Kaplan Fund provided a $50,000 grant. The museum and three other local arts groups collectively received $75,000 from the New York City government in mid-1993.

City officials officially rededicated the house on June 21, 1994. Ultimately, the King Manor Museum had cost $2 million to renovate, and the park had cost $4 million. Although Fox had no official position at the museum, he often gave lectures and performances. King Manor's annual visitor count increased from two thousand to fifteen thousand between 1995 and 1999, in part because of a campaign that sought to attract local residents. In addition, as part of the Jamaica Action Plan, the city spent $127,000 on a fence around the park, which was finished in 1997. Although drug use in the park had declined by the late 1990s, the NYPD was still conducting sting operations to identify drug users there. Hispanic residents of the surrounding neighborhood were also using parts of the park for soccer practice, angering the area's black residents.

=== 2000s to present ===
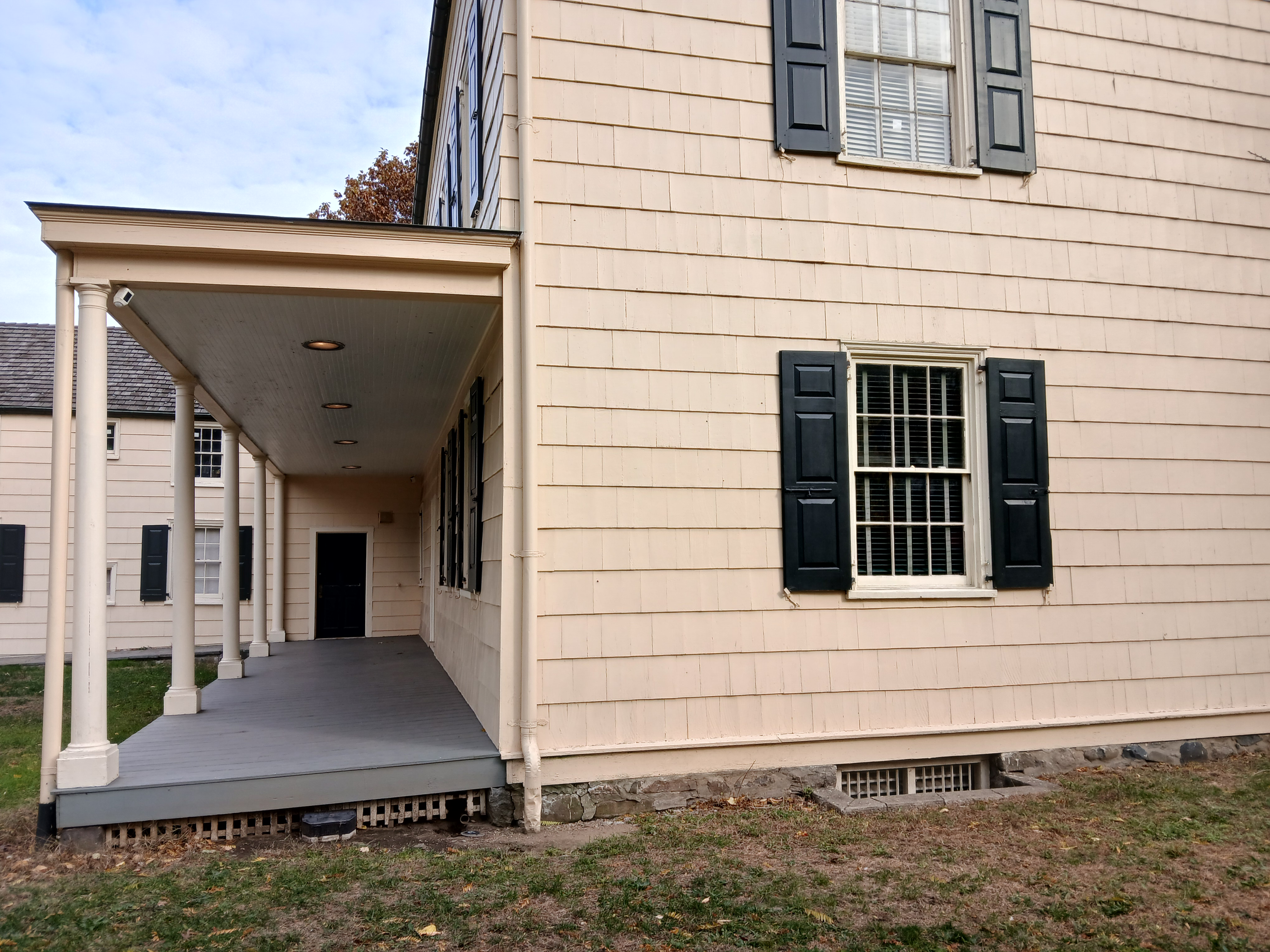
Porch behind the original house, seen from the west

A $300,000 renovation was announced in May 2002. The project included new doors, shutters, and windows; repairs to the wooden porch, which had been restored in the 1990s but was starting to buckle; repainting of the facade; and upgrades to the air conditioning, lighting, and fire detectors. The museum remained open during the renovation and offered free admission to compensate for the closure of several rooms. By 2004, researchers within the park had uncovered 4,000 artifacts during the past decade. The following year, the house was added to the state's Underground Railroad Heritage Trail because of the Kings' roles as abolitionists. The house was one of several attractions in Jamaica that were promoted by the Greater Jamaica cultural district in the mid-2000s. Local residents also began advocating for a turf field in the surrounding park.

King Manor and Park were again upgraded as part of a $1.7 million project that was completed in 2008. The project included drainage upgrades, drinking fountains, a turf field, and a concert space in the park, as well as new trees and driveway at the mansion. Queens borough president Helen Marshall gave $200,000 for a restoration of the house's chimney in 2009; the Daily News reported that the allocation was a "pet project", as one of the museum's vice presidents was married to City Council member Leroy Comrie. Another $2.2 million renovation of King Park was announced in 2015, which involved upgrades to the gazebo, paths, and greenery. NYC Parks announced a set of new entrances for the park in 2017 and replaced the mansion's roof in 2018 for $1.8 million, though museum officials had to repair the second-story ceiling themselves. A new space for temporary exhibits opened in the second-floor sitting room in December 2019.

The mansion was closed temporarily in 2020 due to the COVID-19 pandemic in New York City; Roy Fox, who had been the live-in caretaker for three decades, continued to maintain the property. The same year, the Robert David Lion Gardiner Foundation gave the museum a $13,750 grant for an exhibition catalog. A Parks Enforcement Patrol substation in the park was finished in 2021, and the house's HVAC system was fixed that year for $718,000. Nonetheless, King Manor officials claimed in 2023 that the house was suffering from neglect: its exterior had not been repainted in two decades, while the dining room was partly closed because of falling plaster. In addition, museum officials alleged that, after the Wi-Fi stopped working at the end of 2020, NYC Parks failed to restore Wi-Fi to the house, causing event organizers to avoid the house. In early 2025, NYC Parks announced plans for an $8.3 million restoration of the house, including accessibility upgrades, along with a $4.6 million renovation of a playground in King Park.

== Architecture ==
It is not known who designed King Manor. The house's design contains elements of the Federal, Georgian, and Greek Revival styles. What is now King Manor is composed of several sections, arranged roughly into an "L" shape. The main house is located in the middle of the estate, while the kitchen is placed in an annex extending north of the easternmost part of the main house.

=== Exterior ===
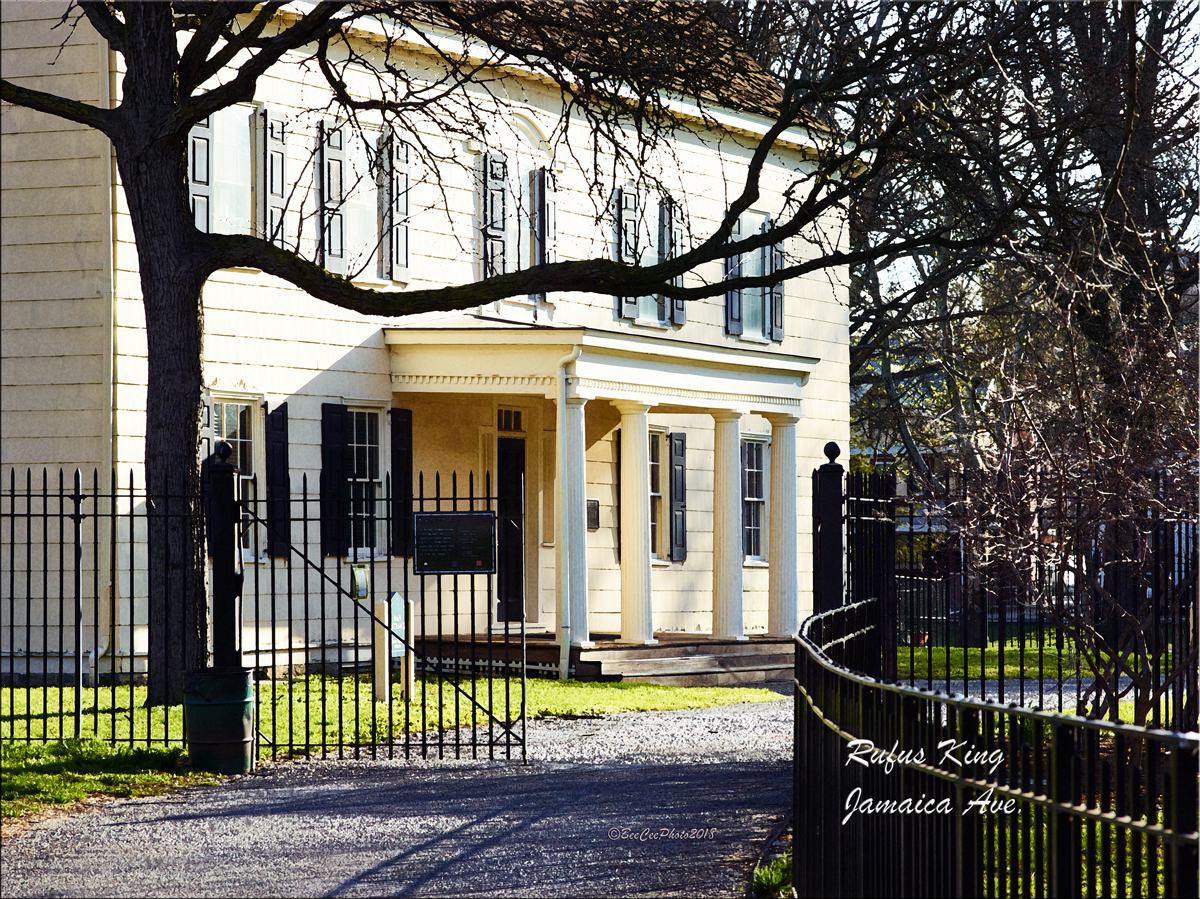
The front porch of King Manor

The western part of the main house was constructed when Colgan lived there in the mid-18th century and is two stories high with a half-story attic. The eastern part dates from the Kings' 1800s renovation. The facade is composed mostly of white frame shingles. The design of the two sections is similar, but the architectural elements in the eastern section are wider, making the facade slightly asymmetrical. Both sections are topped by a gambrel roof, which has two chimneys above it. The main entrance is through a portico to the south, supported by fluted columns in the Doric order. Within the portico is a Dutch door, a sidelight on either side of the door, and a transom window above the door. The portico itself has a cornice with dentils, and there is a Palladian window directly above the portico.

The rear annex, an extension of Poyer's original house, may be the oldest part of the current King Manor. It includes the Colgan and Smith families' kitchen, as well as another kitchen and a lean-to added by the Kings to the north. The rear annex is composed of one- and two-story high sections, topped by gable roofs. Both sections of the annex are topped by brick chimneys. The southern section of the annex, abutting the main house, is two stories high and has a porch with columns.

=== Interior ===
The interior spaces largely date to when Rufus King renovated and expanded the house in the early 19th century. King Manor had 17 rooms, including a drawing room and family room, after King finished renovating the house; the mansion had the same number of rooms in 1898. By the 1990s, there were 29 rooms. The rooms included imported marble fireplace mantels.

==== First story ====
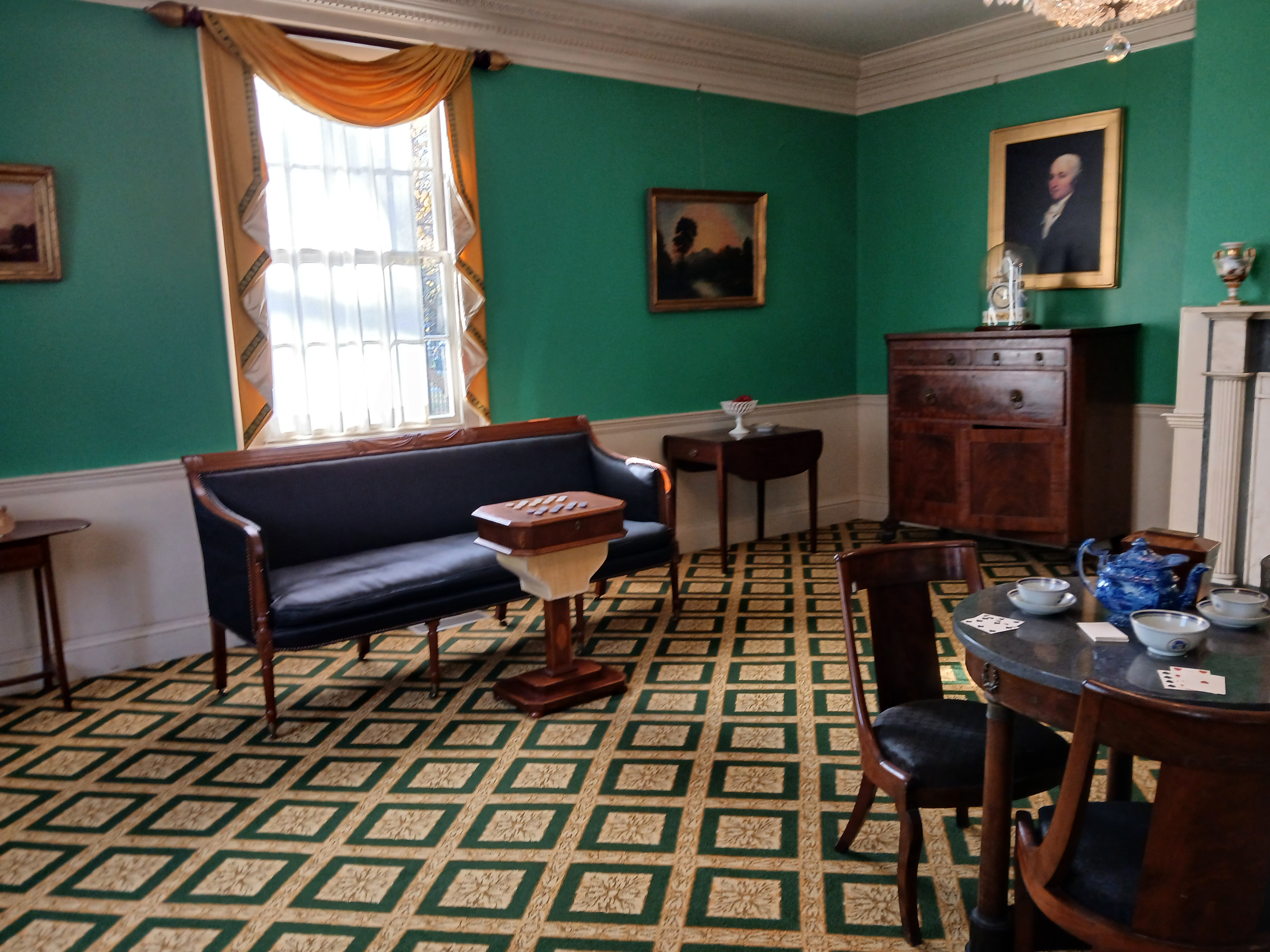
The parlor room

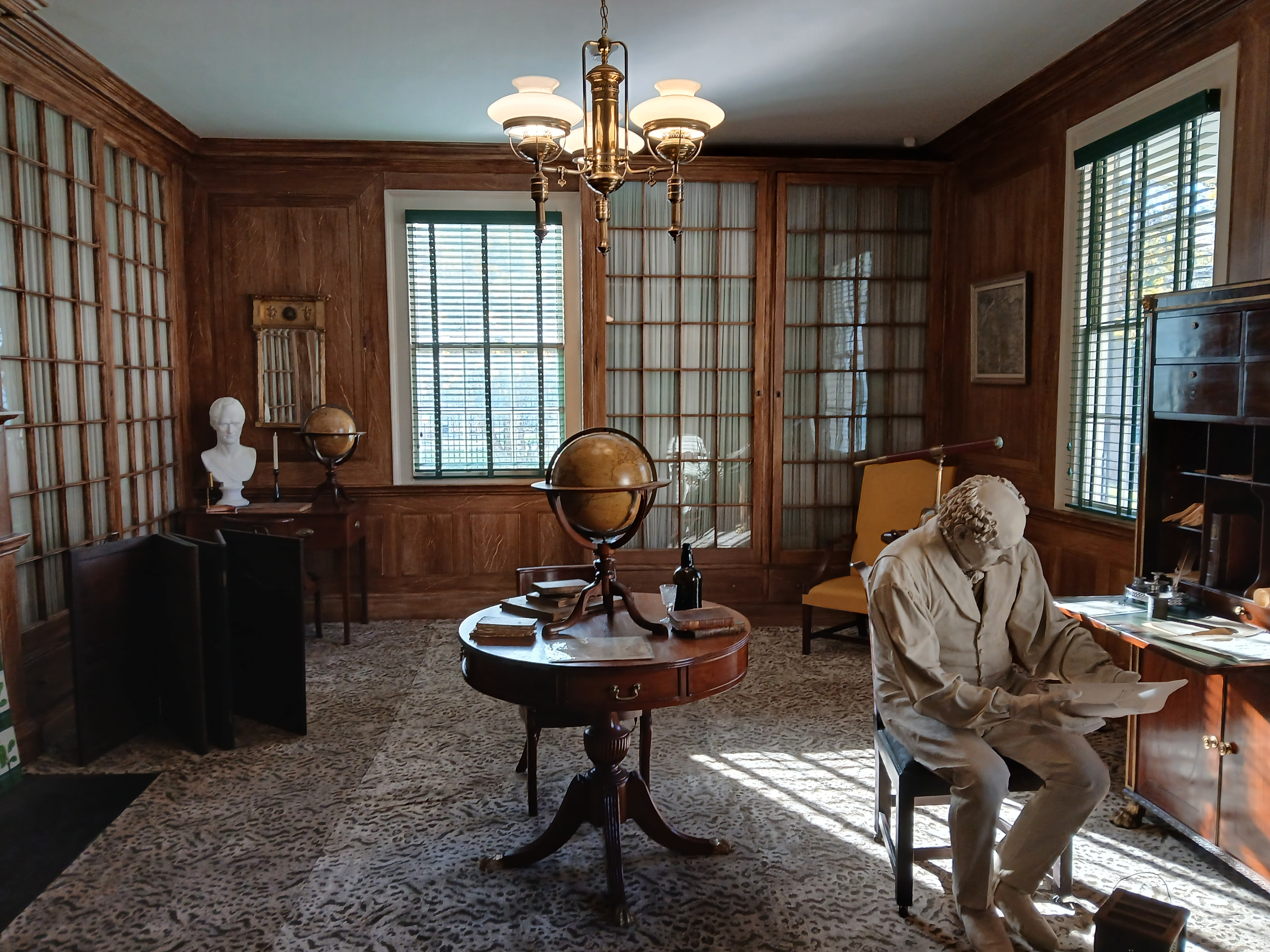
The library

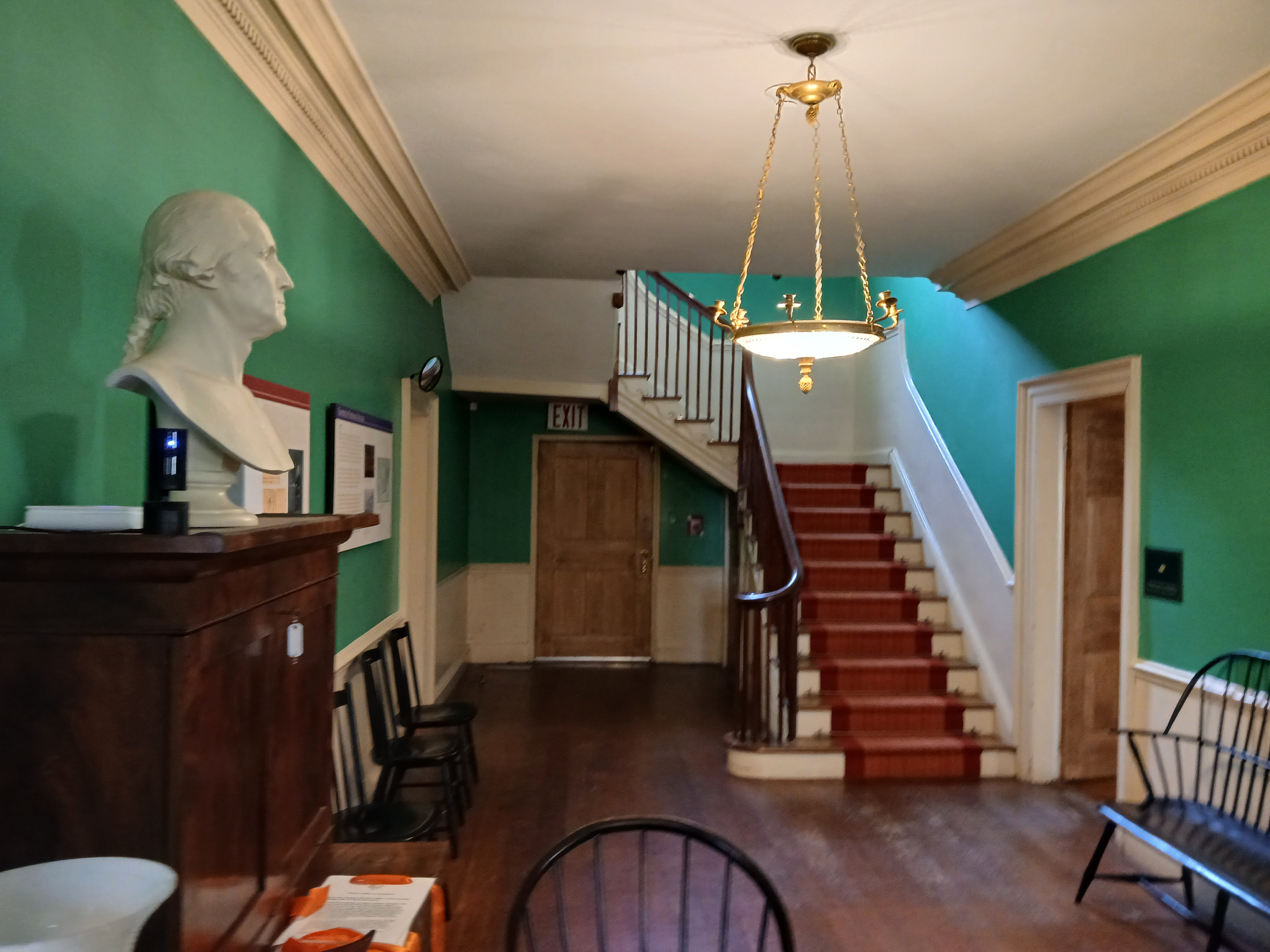
The main hall

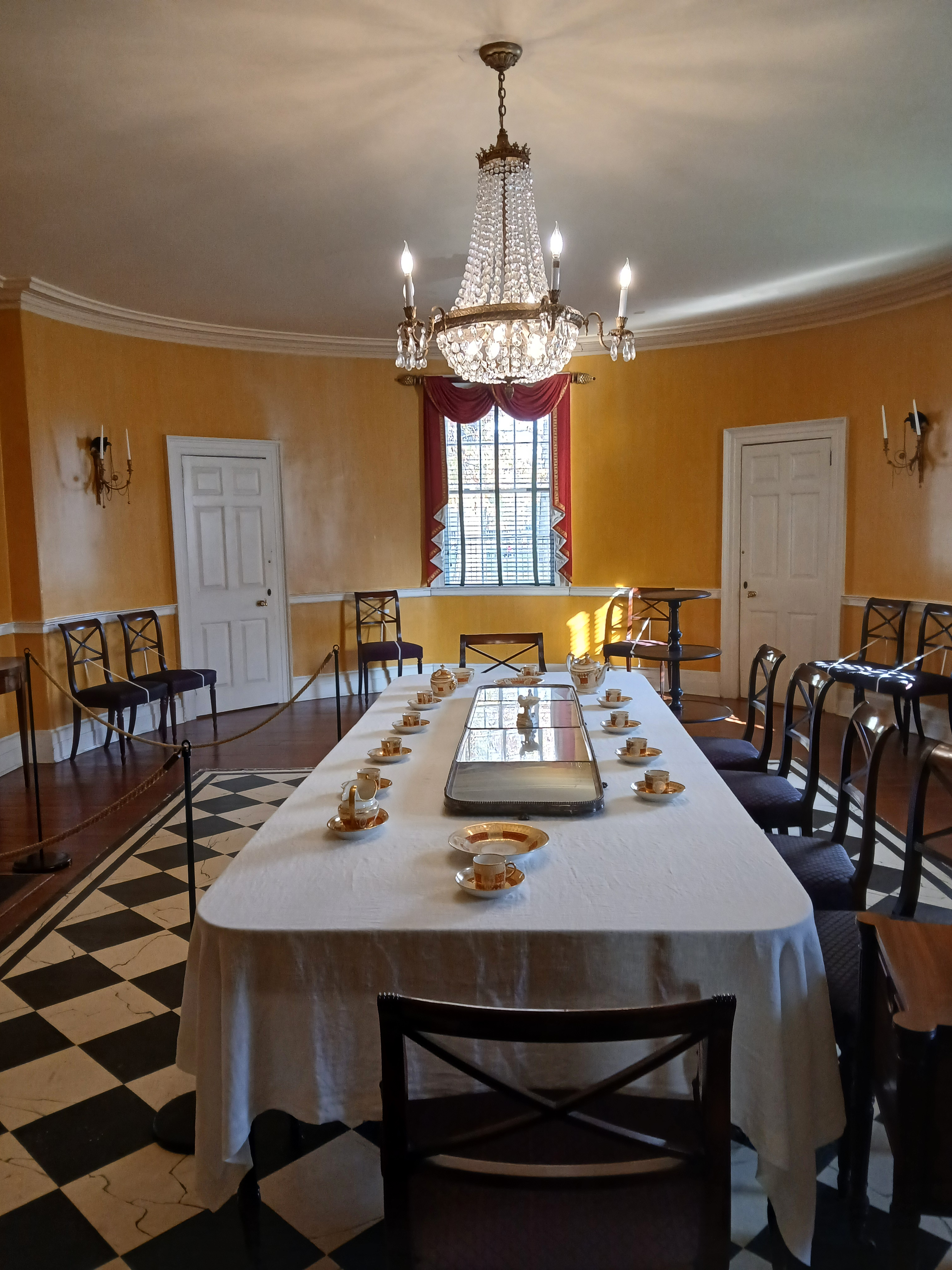
The dining room with curved wall

Generally, the first floor plan is symmetrical and is bisected by a central hallway, but the main entrance door is itself placed asymmetrically within the hallway. The main hallway measures around 12 by 40 feet (3.7 by 12.2 m) across. The walls of the hallway are made of plaster, with a baseboard and a chair rail on the lower half of the wall; there are four doorways leading off the hallway. Above the walls is a cornice with moldings and dentils. There is a staircase to the second floor at the rear of the eastern wall. The stairway has a balustrade with square spindles, a handrail, and newel posts with volutes. The stair also includes a window on one landing and a molding on the adjacent wall.

The western half of the first floor contains a parlor and a library (the latter also known as the family room). Both rooms are 24 feet (7.3 m) wide; the parlor is 16 feet (4.9 m) deep, while the library is 22 feet (6.7 m) deep. The parlor, at the southwest corner of the house, has a gray-and-white marble fireplace mantel, which was added in the late 1820s and was designed in the Greek Revival style. The parlor also has a paneled door; a plaster wall with baseboard and chair rail; six-over-six sash windows; and a cornice with moldings, dentils, and Greek frets. In the rear of the western wing is a library with three built-in floor to ceiling bookcases, which were imported from England and once accommodated over five thousand volumes. When King lived in the house, the library was filled with 5,000 books, mainly about the Americas. These included over 400 volumes from the 16th to mid-18th centuries. The fireplace has white-and-blue Dutch tiles on its mantel, as well as paneling on its overmantel. The library's wall also contains a chair rail; the walls are painted to resemble paneling with wood grains, giving the impression that the lower half of the wall is wainscoted. Other elements of the library include a paneled door.

At the southeast corner of the first floor is the dining room, which measures 22 by 34 feet (6.7 by 10.4 m) across, has a Federal-style fireplace and a curved wall at one end. The curved wall was not dissimilar to other American houses built after the Revolutionary War, which often had curved walls, although these houses' exteriors were also typically curved. By contrast, King Manor's dining room had a rectangular exterior wall, and so there were closets in the spaces between the exterior corners and the dining room's wall. The fireplace itself is flanked by pilasters that support a mantelpiece shelf; it is topped by a frieze with a central ellipse. Above the fireplace is a chimney shaft that blends with the baseboard and chair rail on the wall. The room has gold-painted walls, red window curtains, and a black-and-white floor covering. Behind the dining room and stairway are the kitchens, which, in the 1800s, were relocated from where the dining room is now. A serving pantry links the kitchens and the dining room.

==== Second story ====
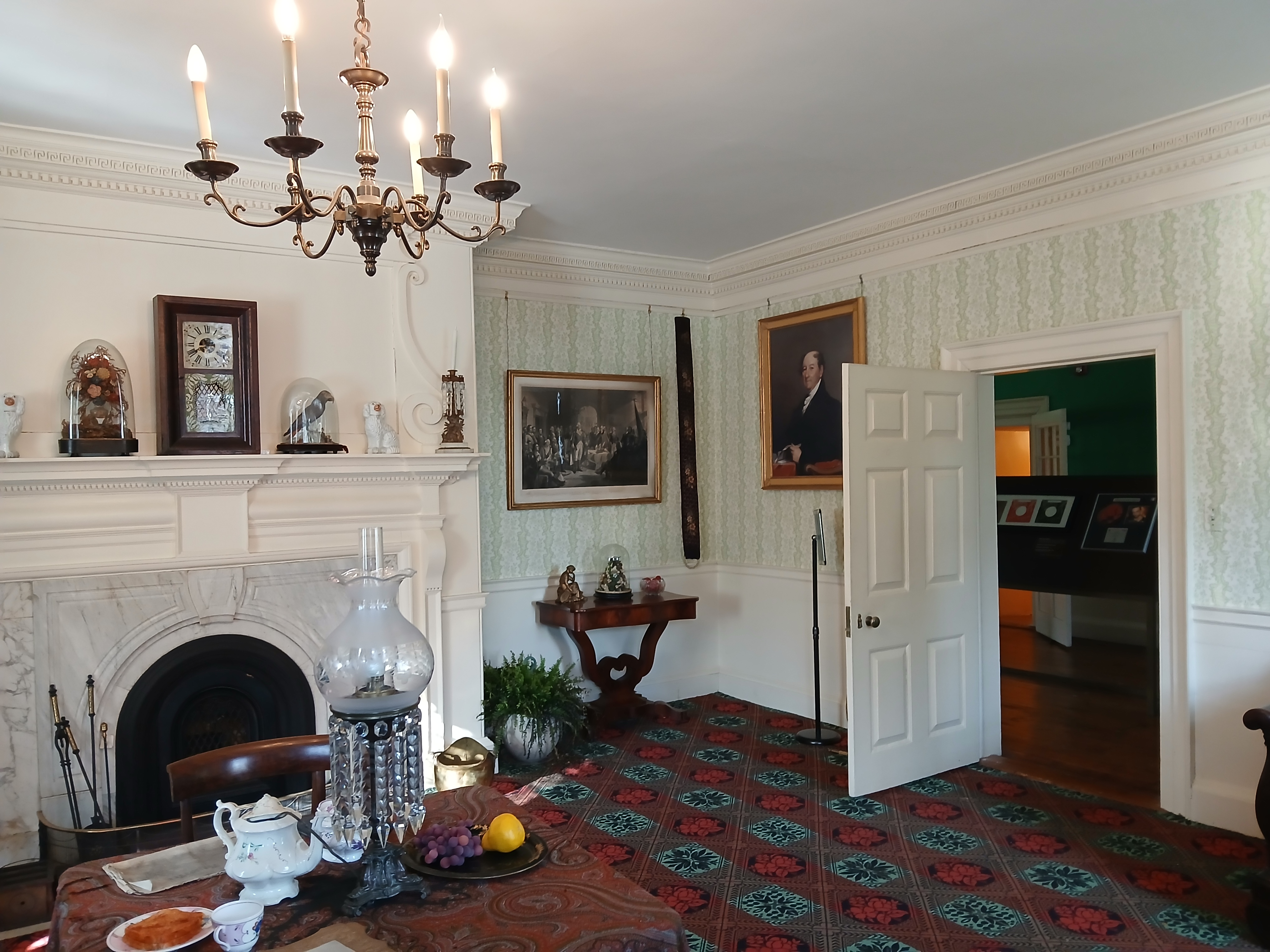
The sitting room

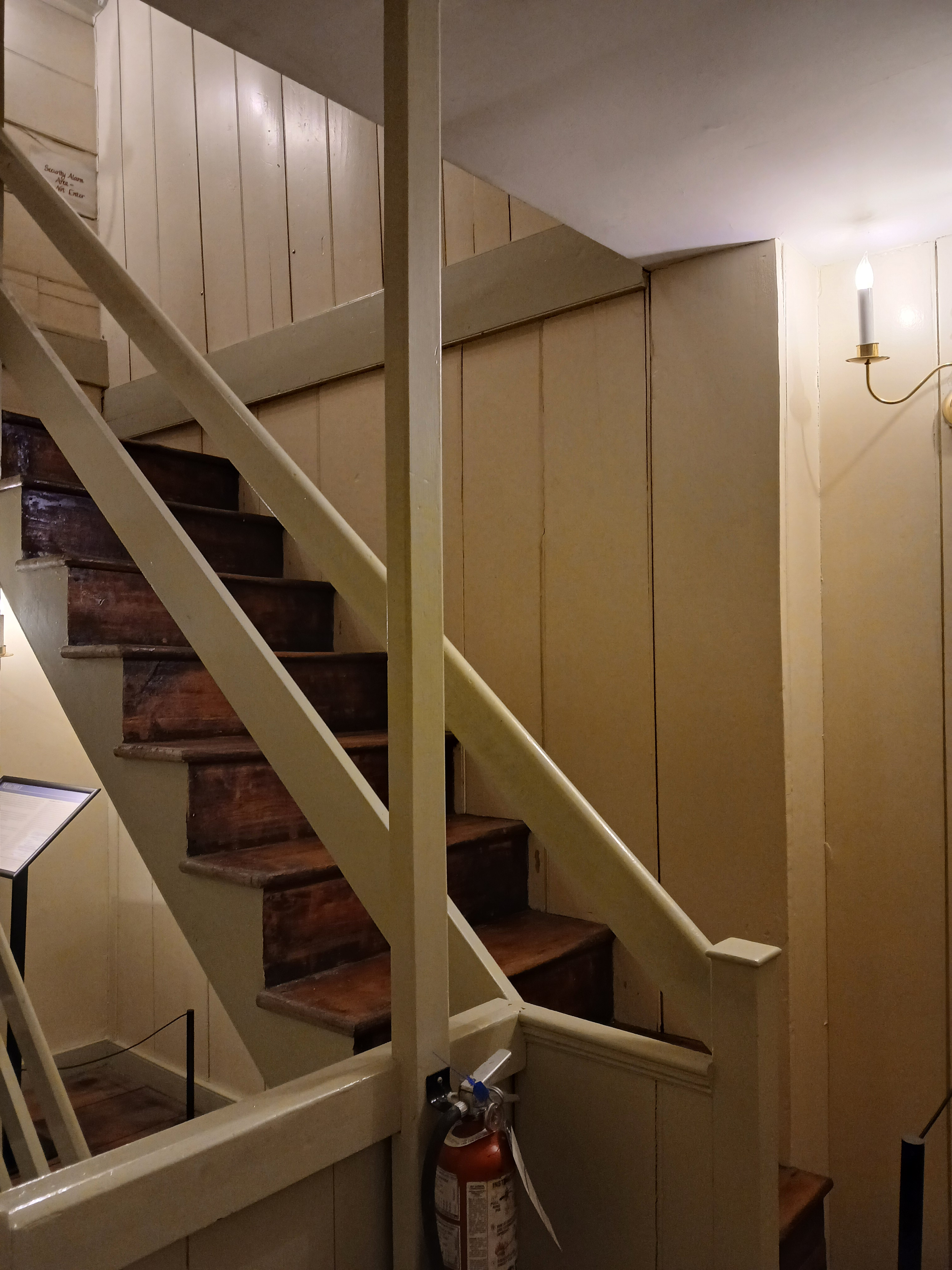
A stair from a second-story passageway to the attic

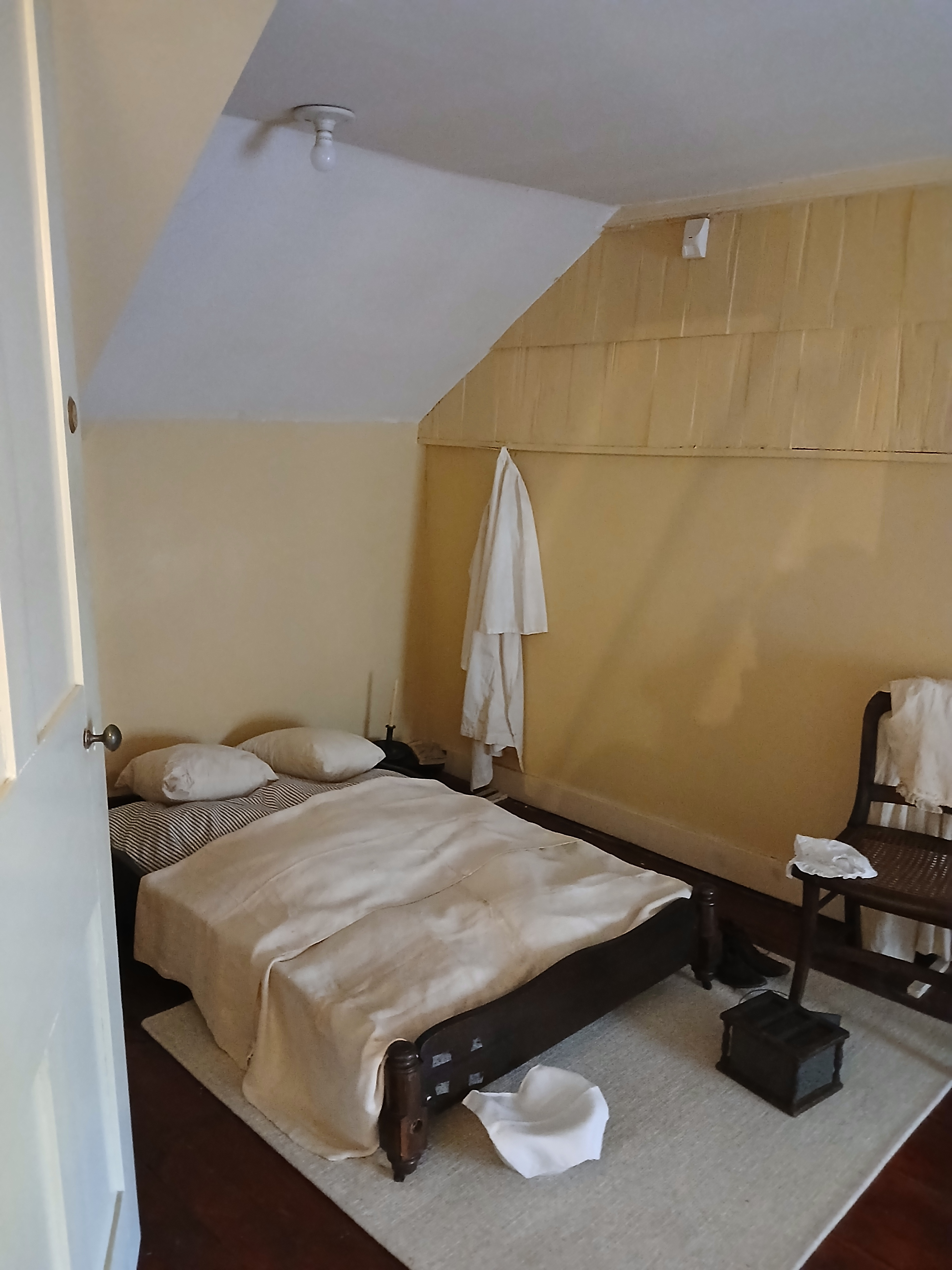
The children's playroom / maid's bedroom

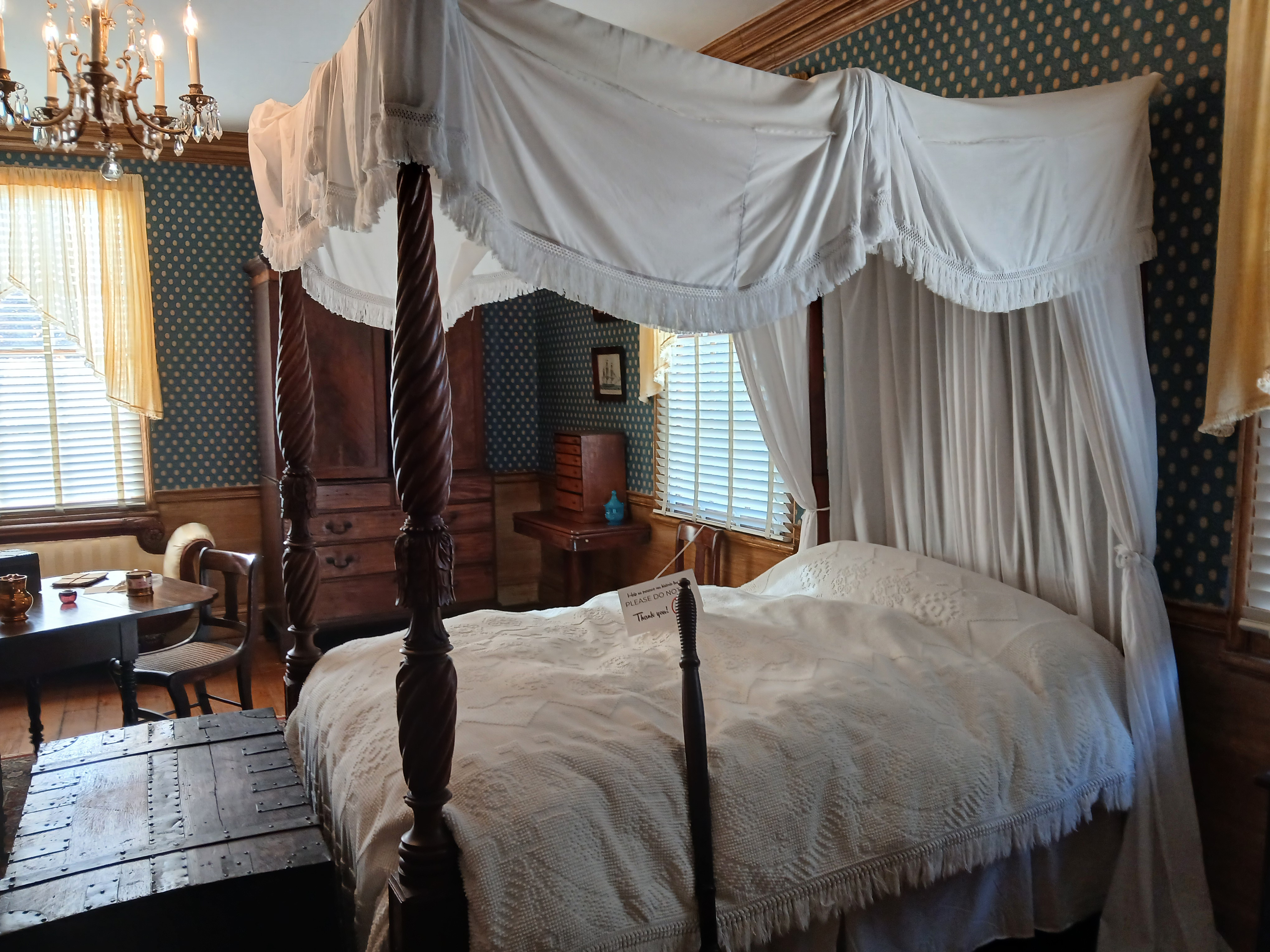
Rufus King's bedroom

The second story generally has a similar floor plan to the first story. A Brooklyn Daily Eagle article from 1898 characterized the second floor as having four large rooms, measuring 16–24 feet (5–7 m) deep and 24 feet wide, as well as three smaller rooms. The main house's second floor has a sitting room, bedrooms, and a children's playroom. The staircase from the rear of the first floor opens into a wide central hall on the second floor, which has a cornice with moldings and dentils. At the eastern end of the main house, a short flight of steps lead down to the former children's playroom, which has a closet and walls with paneling. The room, which had pink walls by the 1990s, was also used by servants. Next to the children's playroom, a stair connects with the attic.

To the southwest is a sitting room, which retains most of its 18th-century details. The sitting room has a marble fireplace frame (which was later concealed by an arched fireplace) and an ornamental fireplace mantel, above which is an overmantel decorated with paneling and a cornice. There is also a door, baseboard, chair rail, and cornice in the sitting room, similar to those in the first-floor parlor. This room was once used by the Queens Borough Musical Society (which outfitted the room with Empire-style furniture) and has built-in closets on either side of the fireplace.

The bedroom at the northwest corner, formerly used by Rufus King, has baseboards, chair rails, and cornices on the walls. There is a fireplace on its south wall, surrounded by wooden panels. The fireplace itself is decorated with an eared frame, an arched marble panel added in the mid-19th century, and a mantelpiece shelf topped by a frieze. There are built-in closets on either side of the fireplace. The King room was once used as an assembly room by the Queens Borough Musical Society and also had Empire-style furniture. Another bedroom in the northeast corner had small closets and was outfitted with multiple pieces of furniture by the early 20th century.

==== Other stories ====
As designed, the third floor had smaller rooms than the floors below. A Brooklyn Daily Eagle article from 1898 described the third floor as having five rooms and a spacious attic. The third floor is occupied by the caretaker's apartment, which consists of two bedrooms under the gambrel roof. Some of the upper-story rooms were generally closed to the public in the 21st century. There is also a cellar under the entire house. The rafters in the cellar's ceiling were made by hand, as were the wooden flooring.

== Operation ==
King Manor is owned and maintained by the New York City Department of Parks and Recreation, and its interior furnishings are supervised by the King Manor Association. The KMA was formed in 1900 to care for the house and collect historical items there. The museum became a member of the Historic House Trust in 1989 and a member of Cultural Collaborative Jamaica in the 1990s. The house has historically been known alternately as King Mansion; the City History Club of New York said in 1909 that the "Manor" name was a misnomer, as no manors have ever existed in Queens County.

=== Collection ===
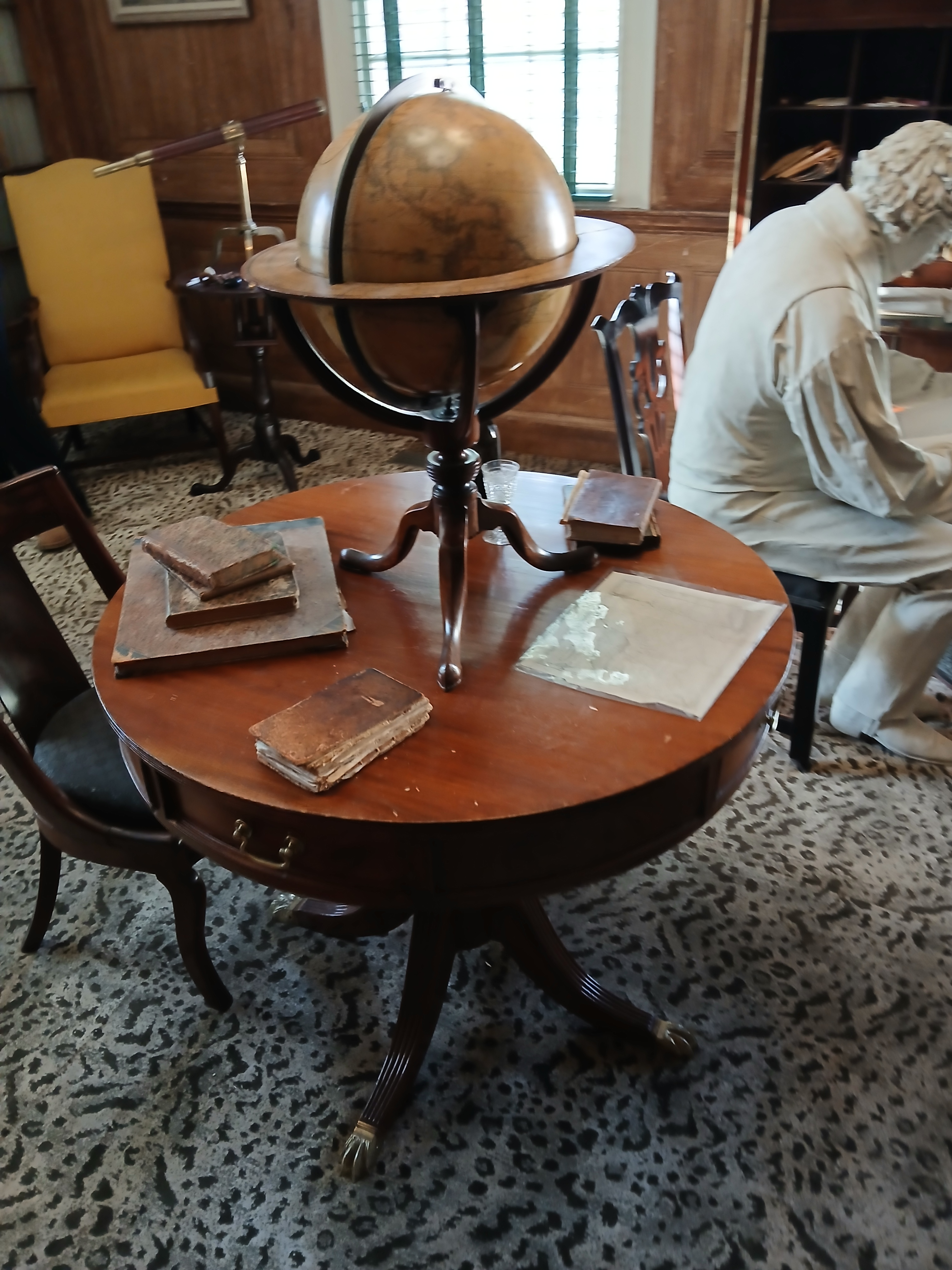
Various objects in the library

Until the museum closed for renovation in 1987, its collection mostly included furnishings and objects from the 18th and 19th centuries. When the house opened to the public in 1900, it was described as having a piano, a mahogany bed, an old desk, and a rare portrait of the Washington family. The kitchen featured a stove and large brick ovens, while the second-floor hall displayed a spinning wheel. The KMA encouraged people to lend or donate Colonial-style objects; in its first decade, the association loaned or acquired artwork, furnishings, carpets, engravings, and bric-à-brac. The northeast second-floor room displayed objects like furniture, clocks, and tea trays; there were also objects in glass cases and around the fireplace. Other parts of the house displayed objects like kitchen utensils, porcelain, tableware, Rufus King's desk, a four-poster bed, and a portrait of 18th-century resident Mary Colgan. Over the years, the KMA also received items that once belonged to the Kings, such as a letter from John Alsop King and Rufus King's table silverware.

Following the 1980s and 1990s renovations, reproductions of original furnishings were installed, including the carpet in the parlor and the 5,000 books in the library. The house also contains original artifacts, such as an 18th-century piano built in England and an old leather horse-hair sofa under the west window that belonged to Rufus King. The library includes a plaster statue of Rufus King.

=== Programming and events ===
The house was used for club meetings and events beginning in October 1900; these events took place only during the day until 1909, when the first nighttime club meeting was hosted. Events at the house in the first half of the 20th century included anniversary celebrations, fundraisers, and plays. By mid-century, the house was also used for events such as gift-wrapping lessons and art competitions. Tours of historical sites in Queens also sometimes passed through the house. By the late 20th century, the house held events such as celebrations of King's birthday, Historic House Festivals, Historic Games Weekends, fall festivals, and historic-house tours. At the end of the century, the house and park often hosted cultural events. The mansion's events in the 21st century included naturalization ceremonies, poetry readings, tours of non-public parts of the house, holiday concerts, and networking events.

The museum gave tours in both English and Spanish by the end of the 20th century. In 2001, the King Manor Museum began operating an archeology program in conjunction with local public schools. As of 2023, the museum's educational programs include classes on the Revolutionary War and on King's abolitionist activities. In addition, guided tours are hosted between February and December.

=== Exhibits ===
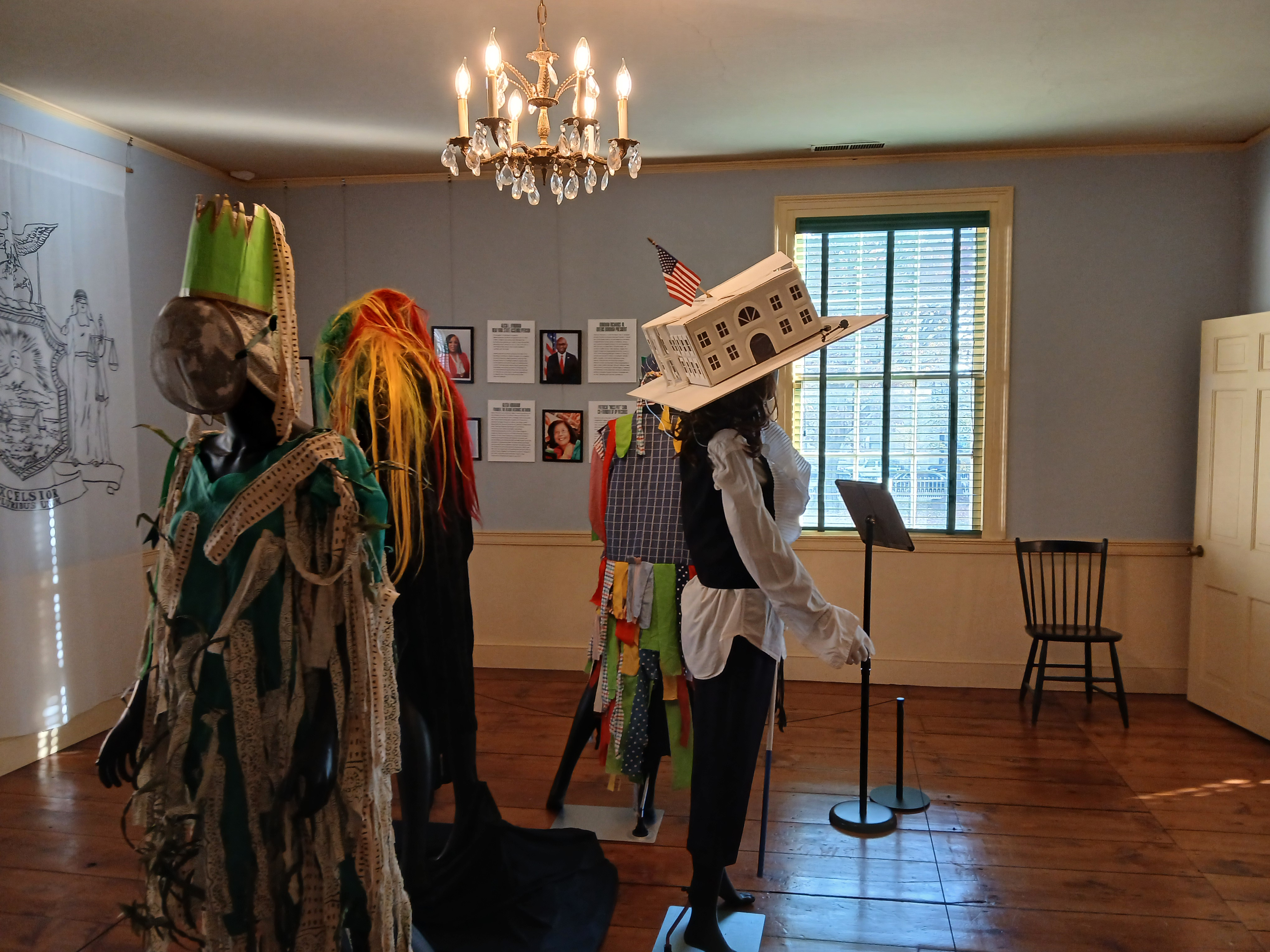
Jamaica/Jamaica (2025), a temporary exhibit themed to the heritage of the nation of Jamaica

In King Manor's early years as a museum, one room on the second floor was set aside for the display of furniture and antiquities. The house hosted exhibits such as antiques collections, as well as sampler, metal, and textile exhibitions. By the mid-20th century, exhibits included showcases of heirlooms and a showcase of the house's history. One news article from 1957 described the house as a "treasure-trove of 18th century lore", with furniture, furnishings, books, and pictures dating to the 18th century.

To attract visitors after the 1990s renovation, the museum began posting bilingual signs and hosting events in both English and Spanish, and the parlor and other first-floor rooms were used as meeting spaces. The parlor displayed a video on King Manor's history, and the public was able to explore many of the rooms, which were not roped off like in other museums. In the 21st century, the King Manor Museum has continued to display exhibits on the King family. Since 2019, the second floor has been used as a space for temporary multimedia exhibits. Some of the temporary exhibitions are also documented online after they have been displayed on the second floor.

== Impact ==
At the end of the 19th century, when the Kings still owned the mansion, the Brooklyn Daily Eagle wrote of the house's colonial architecture and "quaint and charming" furniture, and the Times-Union described the house as "destitute of architectural beauty, either ancient or modern, its chief characteristic being the solidity of its construction". The Standard Union said in 1900 that the house "bears comparatively few traces of the many winters it has weathered" and credited its sturdy construction to the fact that it was built by hand. In 1903, the New York Times described the house as rivaling the Van Cortlandt House "in historical and colonial museum interest", although the Times wrote that the Van Cortlandt House had more artifacts. The Brooklyn Daily Eagle said in 1907 that, despite its nondescript appearance, King Manor was "one of the show places of Jamaica"; a 1913 article from the same newspaper said the house reflected "the individuality of its former owners". The Times-Union said in 1931 that the mansion "maintained its 18th century atmosphere" despite the presence of vehicular traffic and the adjacent Jamaica Avenue elevated railway.

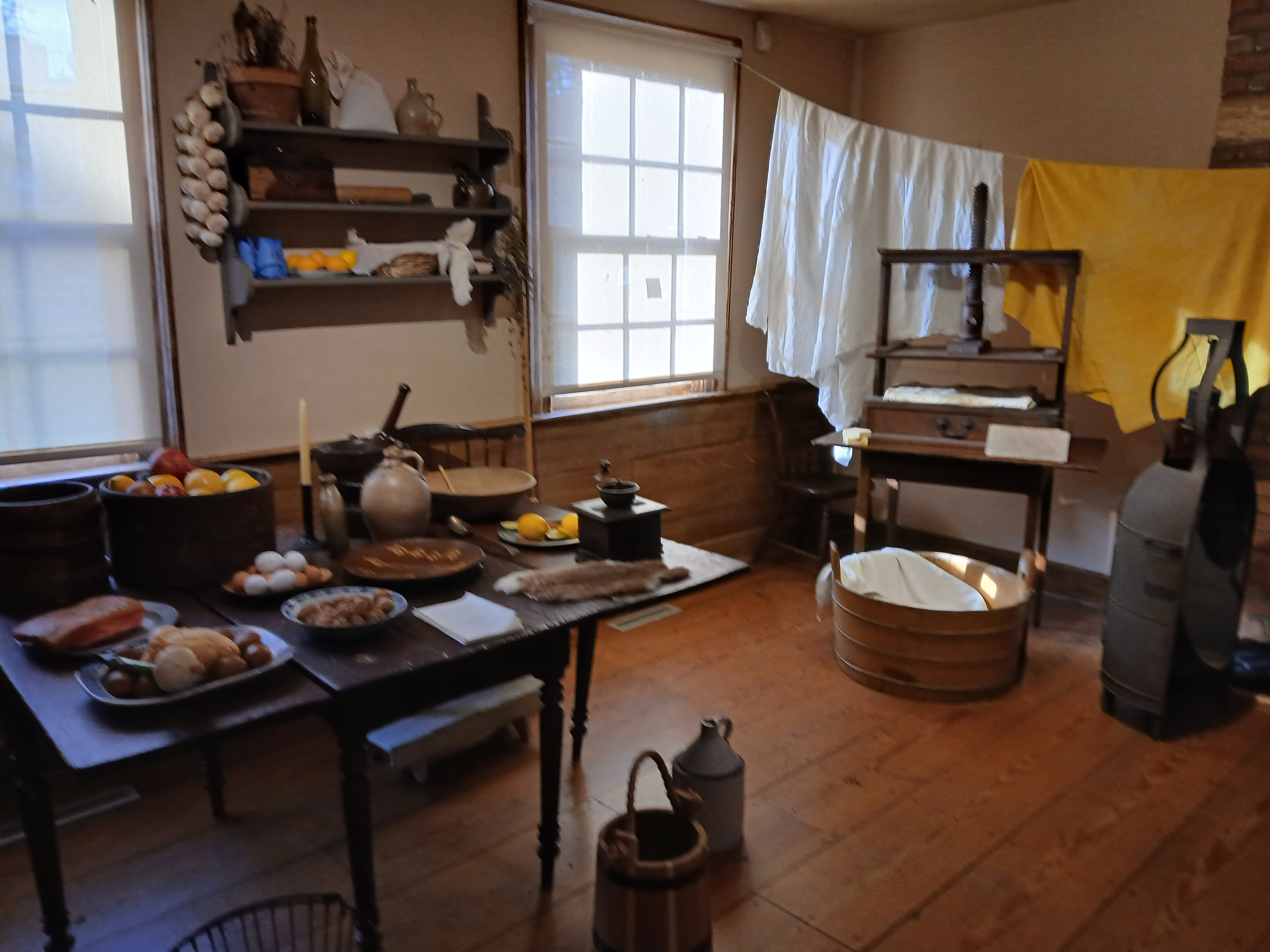
Exhibit of the kitchen

Later reception was also positive. In 1997, one critic for Newsday described the house as an "odd juxtaposition" with the Long Island Rail Road's nearby Jamaica station but also "a rewarding destination for families curious about Long Island's prestigious past". Another critic for the same newspaper wrote the next year that, despite the house's age, it was "an eminently user-friendly attraction run by a high-spirited staff". Mimi Sheraton of the Times said in 2001 that King Manor was "the most rewarding historic site I visited in Queens" and that the house's decorations hinted at the King family's lifestyle. In spite of this, the Daily News wrote in 2009 that the house was "far down the list of the city's favorite tourist sites" because King's roles as a senator and diplomat were relatively obscure.

King Manor has also appeared in several media works. Dorothy and Richard Platt included images of the King Mansion in a 1950s guidebook of historical structures in New York City. The house was depicted in a mural painted at the New York City Subway's 111th Street station in 1977, and it was featured in a TV series produced by Queens Public TV and Queens Council on the Arts in 1996.

The LPC held hearings at the beginning of 1966 to determine whether to designate King Manor as a city landmark, and the exterior of the building was designated as a landmark the same year. The landmark designation also included the grounds of King Park. The house was declared a National Historic Landmark in 1974. The LPC held hearings in January 1976 on the possibility of designating the building's interior as a landmark, and the commission designated parts of the first- and second-floor interiors as a landmark that March. The Queens Chamber of Commerce gave its Historic Structure Award to the mansion during the 1980s.

== See also ==
- List of museums and cultural institutions in New York City
- List of New York City Designated Landmarks in Queens
- List of National Historic Landmarks in New York City
- National Register of Historic Places listings in Queens, New York
