= A. Gracie King =

American banker

- Born: Archibald Gracie King; July 11, 1821; Everton, Liverpool, England
- Died: March 21, 1897 (aged 75); Weehawken, New Jersey, U.S.
- Education: Harvard College
- Occupation: Banker
- Employer(s): Prime, Ward & King, James G. King & Son
- Spouse: Elizabeth Denning Duer (m. 1845)
- Parent(s): James G. King; Sarah Rogers Gracie
- Relatives: Edward King (brother); Rufus King (grandfather); Archibald Gracie (grandfather)

Archibald Gracie King (July 11, 1821 – March 21, 1897) was a prominent American banker.

== Early life ==
King was born on July 11, 1821, in Everton, England near Liverpool. He was one of eleven children born to Sarah Rogers (née Gracie) King and James G. King. Among his siblings was banker Edward King. His father later served as President of New York and Erie Railroad and later became a U.S. Representative from New Jersey.

His paternal grandparents were Mary (née Alsop) King, a daughter of John Alsop (a prominent merchant and Continental Congressman) and Rufus King, the first U.S. Senator from New York and the 3rd and 8th U.S. Minister to the United Kingdom (under Presidents George Washington, John Adams, Thomas Jefferson and John Quincy Adams). His maternal grandfather was Archibald Gracie, a Scottish-born shipping magnate and early American businessman and merchant in New York City and Virginia.

King was educated in America and at the school of Philipp Emanuel von Fellenberg at Hofwyl near Bern, Switzerland, before attending Harvard College, from where he graduated in 1840, thirty years after his father.

== Career ==
After Harvard, King became a clerk at Prime, Ward & King, where he became a partner in 1844. In 1846, King and his family left the firm and started James G. King & Son, which his father ran until his death in 1853 and then Archibald became senior partner of.

He was elected trustee of the Institution for the Savings of Merchants' Clerks in 1861, treasurer in 1865, and president in 1873. Upon his retirement and relocation to New Jersey in 1881, he ended his affiliation with the bank ("the laws of New York requiring trustees of savings banks to be residents of New York"). He was a member of the Chamber of Commerce of the State of New York, and a trustee of the Metropolitan Trust Company.

== Personal life ==
On May 8, 1845, King was married to Elizabeth Denning Duer (1821–1900), a daughter of Hannah Maria (née Denning) Duer and William Alexander Duer, the 7th President of Columbia University. Her grandfathers were U.S. Representative William Denning and Continental Congressman William Duer. Together, they were the parents of:

- Gracie King (1846–1846), who died young.
- Maria Denning King (1848–1925), an author who married John King Van Rensselaer, a son of Henry Bell Van Rensselaer and grandson of Stephen Van Rensselaer III.
- Sara Gracie King (1850–1931), who married Frederic Bronson in 1875. Following his death in 1900, she married Adrian George Iselin Jr. in 1914.
- Frederick Gore King (1852–1937), who married Jessie Arklay, eldest daughter of Patrick Arklay, in 1877. After her death he married Marion Morrison, the librarian of the New York Society Library; he was secretary and treasurer of the Knickerbocker Trust Company.
- Alexander Duer King (1856–1857), who died young.

King died on March 21, 1897, of bronchitis after a lingering illness at "Highwood," his country estate near Weehawken, New Jersey. After a funeral at Calvary Church in New York, he was buried at Grace Episcopal Church in Jamaica, Queens.

=== Descendants ===
Through his daughter Maria, he was a grandfather of John Alexander Van Rensselaer, who married Helen F. Galindo in 1896, and who was arrested in 1908 for attempting to extort $5,000 from his mother; and Frederick Harold Van Rensselaer (1874–1903), who married Josephine Lucy Grinnell (a daughter of Robert Minturn Grinnell and Sophie Van Alen).

Through his daughter Sara, he was a grandfather of Elizabeth Duer Bronson (1877–1914), who married Ambassador Lloyd Carpenter Griscom (a son of shipping magnate Clement Griscom).

Through his son Frederick, he was a grandfather of women's rights entrepreneur Alice Gore King.
