= Clara Coffey =

American landscape architect (1894–1982)

- Born: 1894; Eaton Rapids, Michigan, US
- Died: 1982 (aged 87–88); New York, US
- Education: University of Michigan
- Occupation: landscape architect
- Known for: Park Avenue Malls

Clara Stimson Coffey (1894–1982) was an American landscape architect. Born and educated in the US state of Michigan, she worked briefly in Cleveland, Ohio, then moved to New York City where she spent the remainder of her professional career. She served for six years with the New York City Parks Department as Chief of Tree Plantings. After moving on to private practice she continued to work with the Parks Department on projects, most notably her 1969 redesign of the Park Avenue central plantings. Her firm worked on designs for dozens of parks and playgrounds throughout the city.

Clara Coffey Park in Manhattan is named in her honor. She served on the Municipal Art Commission and was a fellow of the American Society of Landscape Architects. Her landscaping work for the Bailey Houses in the Bronx is on the National Register of Historic Places.

== Early life ==
Clara Stimson Coffey was born in Eaton Rapids, Michigan, United States, in 1894. She attended the University of Michigan, earning a B.S. in Landscape Architecture in 1917 and an M.S. in Landscape Design in 1919.

== Professional career ==
From 1921 to 1922, Coffey worked in the office of landscape designer Warren Manning in Cleveland, Ohio. She then moved to New York where she worked for two landscape architects: first Ellen Shipman and then Marian Coffin. She was in solo practice from 1928 to 1936 when she was hired by the New York City Parks Department as Chief of Tree Plantings. Coffey remained with the department until 1942, at which time she returned to private practice with partners Cynthia Wiley and Alice Ireys. She ran her own landscape firm from 1945 to 1957.

In 1957, Coffey teamed up with Irving Levine and Bertram Blumberg to found Coffey, Levine, and Blumberg. Each partner had a particular specialty: Coffey did plantings, Levine concentrated on grading, and Blumberg handled the business operations and contracts. Levine and Blumberg had both been educated in New York, at New York University and Pratt Institute, respectively. New York City's financial crisis during the 1970s led to difficulty obtaining municipal contracts and the firm dissolved in 1976. New York State regulations of the era restricted business partnerships between building architects and landscape architects, leading to many of the firm's projects being officially credited only to Levine and Blumberg.

== Park Avenue Malls ==
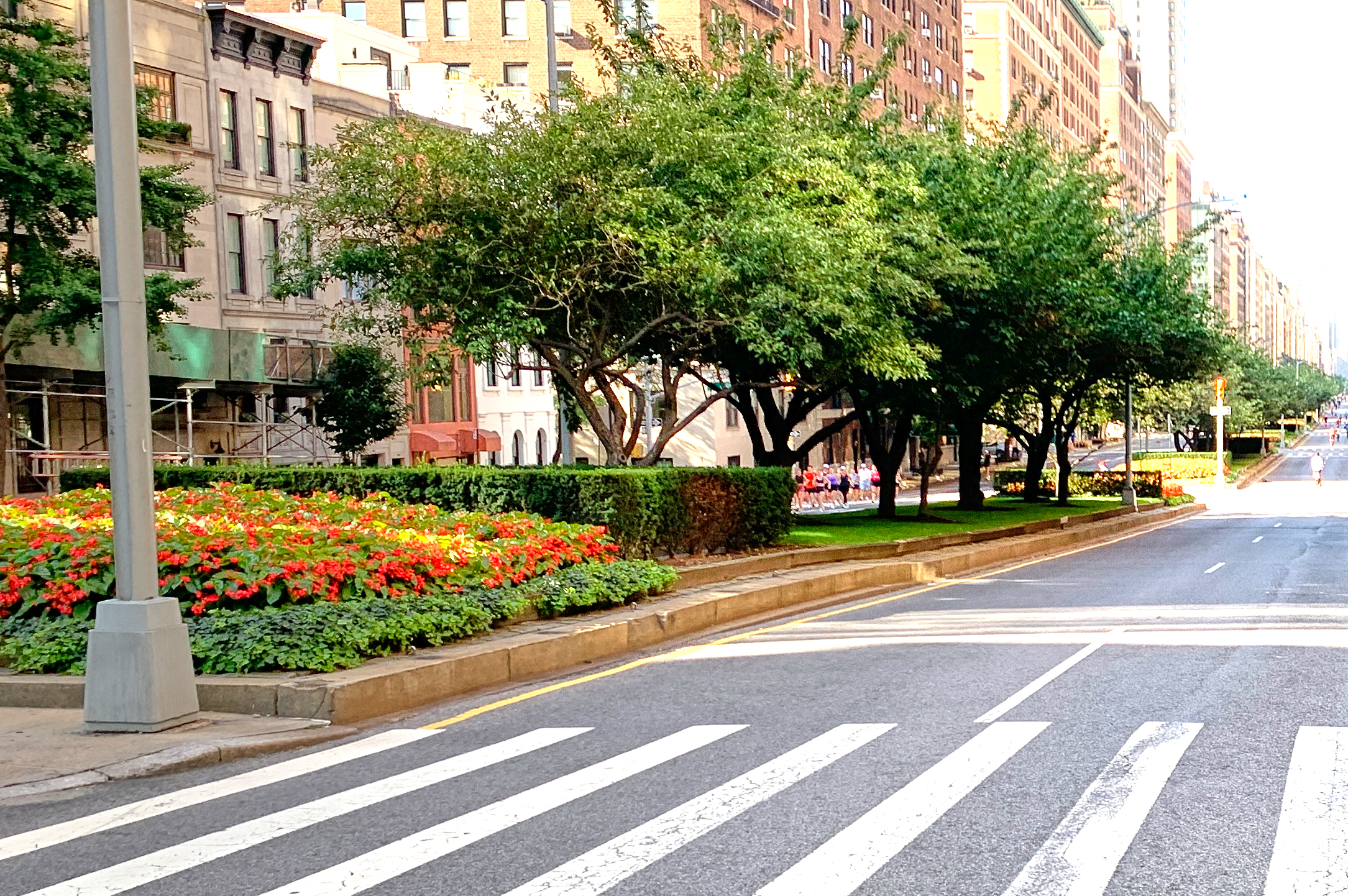
Park Avenue Mall at 91st Street, in August 2023

The New York and Harlem Railroad originally had tracks running at grade level on Fourth Avenue (later renamed Park Avenue) when it was constructed in the 1830s. The tracks were moved underground in the 1870s, leaving openings between the traffic lanes to allow for ventilation for smoke from the trains; these spaces were hidden from view by plantings and made inaccessible to the public by fences. During the 1930s and 1940s, trees, tulips, and other plantings were added but the areas were still fenced off.

The New York City Department of Parks brought in Coffey in 1969 to redesign these areas. Her plan included removing the fences and adding additional plantings of species able to withstand the environmental challenges of the location, such as Kwanzan cherry trees. Seasonal flowers included begonias in the summer and tulips in the fall. In conjunction with horticulturist Peter Van de Wetering, changes were made to improve soil drainage. These plans were implemented between East 50th and 96th Streets during the late 1970s and early 1980s.

As of September 2026, there are plans to redesign Park Avenue between East 46th and East 57th Streets to make the area more pedestrian-friendly. The proposed changes include removing a vehicle lane from both the northbound and southbound directions of Park Avenue, allowing the central median to be expanded to twice its current width, and redesignating a second southbound lane as a bidirectional bicycle path.

== Bailey Houses ==
The Bailey Avenue–West 193rd Street Houses at 2660 Bailey Avenue in the Bronx is a 20-story, 233-unit low-rent residential building built in 1973 for the New York City Housing Authority. In 2026, the property was added to the National Register of Historic Places. Coffey and Irving Levine designed the building's landscaping.

With limited space on the 2.35-acre (0.95 ha) steeply sloping lot, Coffey and Levine designed community and recreational areas with walkways through a natural setting, seating, a basketball court, and play areas. A courtyard is enclosed by corduroy concrete walls which echo the style of the panels on the building's exterior. An 81-space parking area for cars is also included.

== Other projects ==
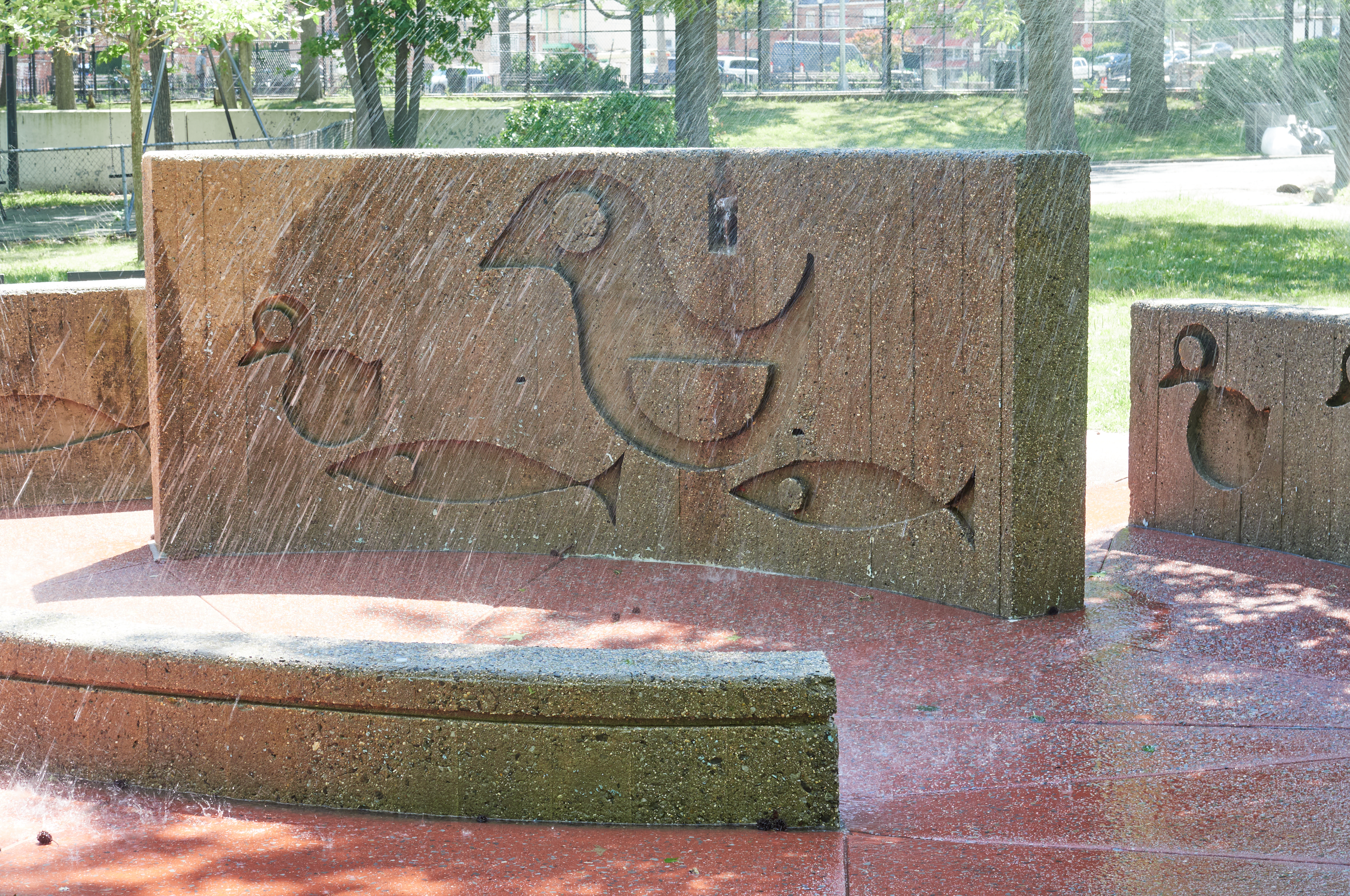
Fountain at Haffen Park

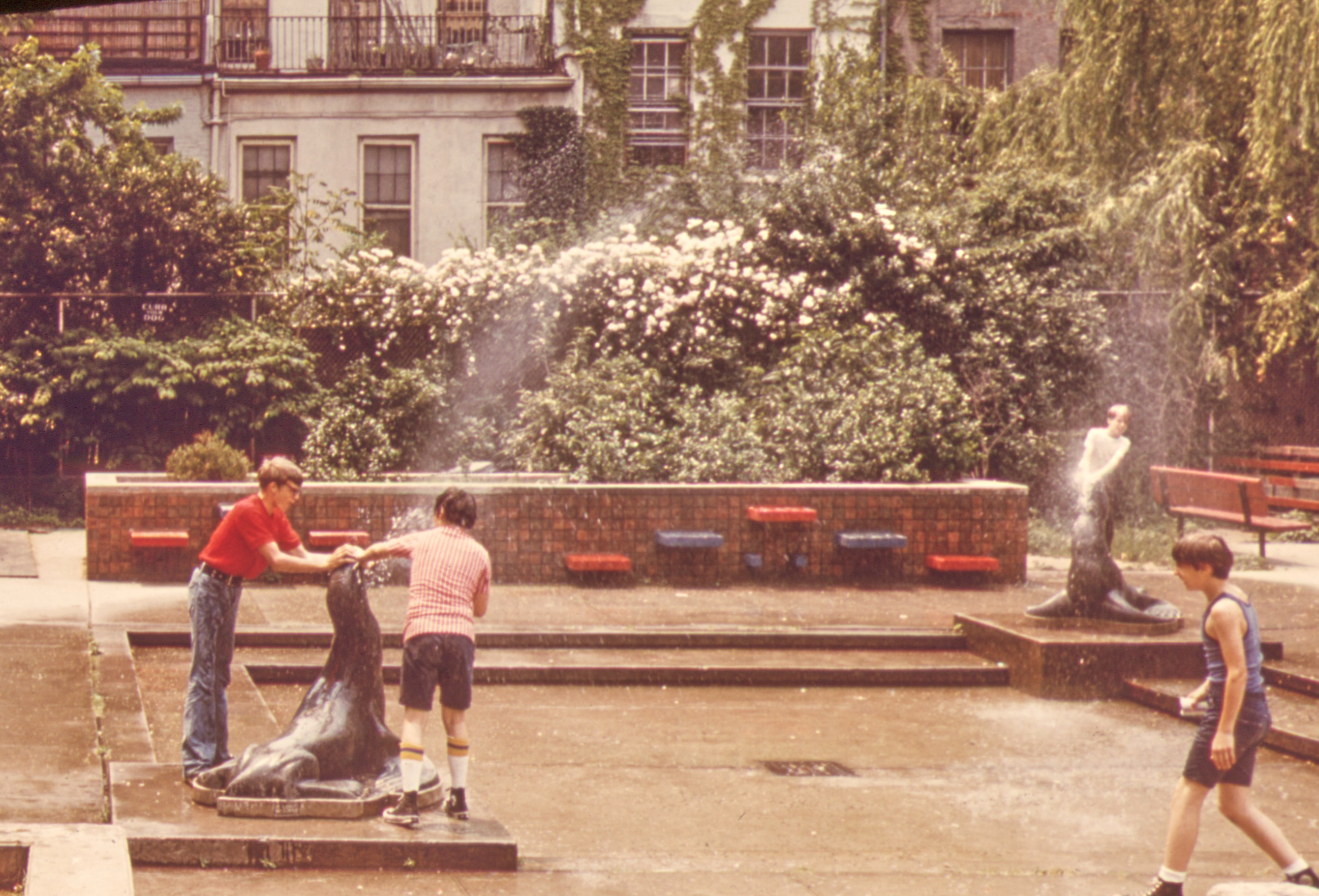
Clement Clarke Moore Park in 1973

Coffey, Levine, and Blumberg designed many New York City parks and playgrounds including Haffen Park (Bronx, 1968), Clement Clarke Moore Park (Manhattan, 1969), Yellowstone Park (Queens, 1970), Strickland Park (Brooklyn), and Seton Falls Park (Bronx); the total portfolio counted 30 parks and 24 playgrounds. Other projects included work at the Central Park Conservatory, Sutton Place, and Brooklyn's Prospect Park where she worked on the Vale of Cashmere.

Coffey's 1969 work in Prospect Park was controversial. M.M. Graff from the Friends of Prospect Park criticized Coffey for removing many of the existing trees and other plants such as hemlocks, rhododendrons, and azaleas and replacing them with weeping cherries which required a lot of work to maintain properly. Robert M. Makla from the Prospect Park Advisory Board likewise complained that the new design moved away from the original Frederick Law Olmsted design, especially lamenting the loss of what he called "one of the great rhododendron collections in the country". Makla noted that the new, more formal, plantings would require horticultural attention beyond what the Parks Department had allocated for the park.

A plan to renovate the southeast corner of Central Park, prepared by Coffey, Levine and Blumberg in c. 1974, was also the subject of controversy. It had initially been approved and funded for $2,500,000 (equivalent to $12,300,000 in 2024) but then rejected by the Parks Department as being unimaginative. Parks official Leticia Kent said that the plan "looked like something the W.P.A. would do". The plan by Louise Dees-Porch, which replaced it, included dredging of the duck pond, different plantings, and replacement of about half the asphalt-paved paths with soft clay.

Although she worked mostly on projects in New York, Coffey did some work outside the city. She was a consultant to Julian Whittlesey and Albert Mayer for the Indian planned city of Chandigarh.

== Honors ==
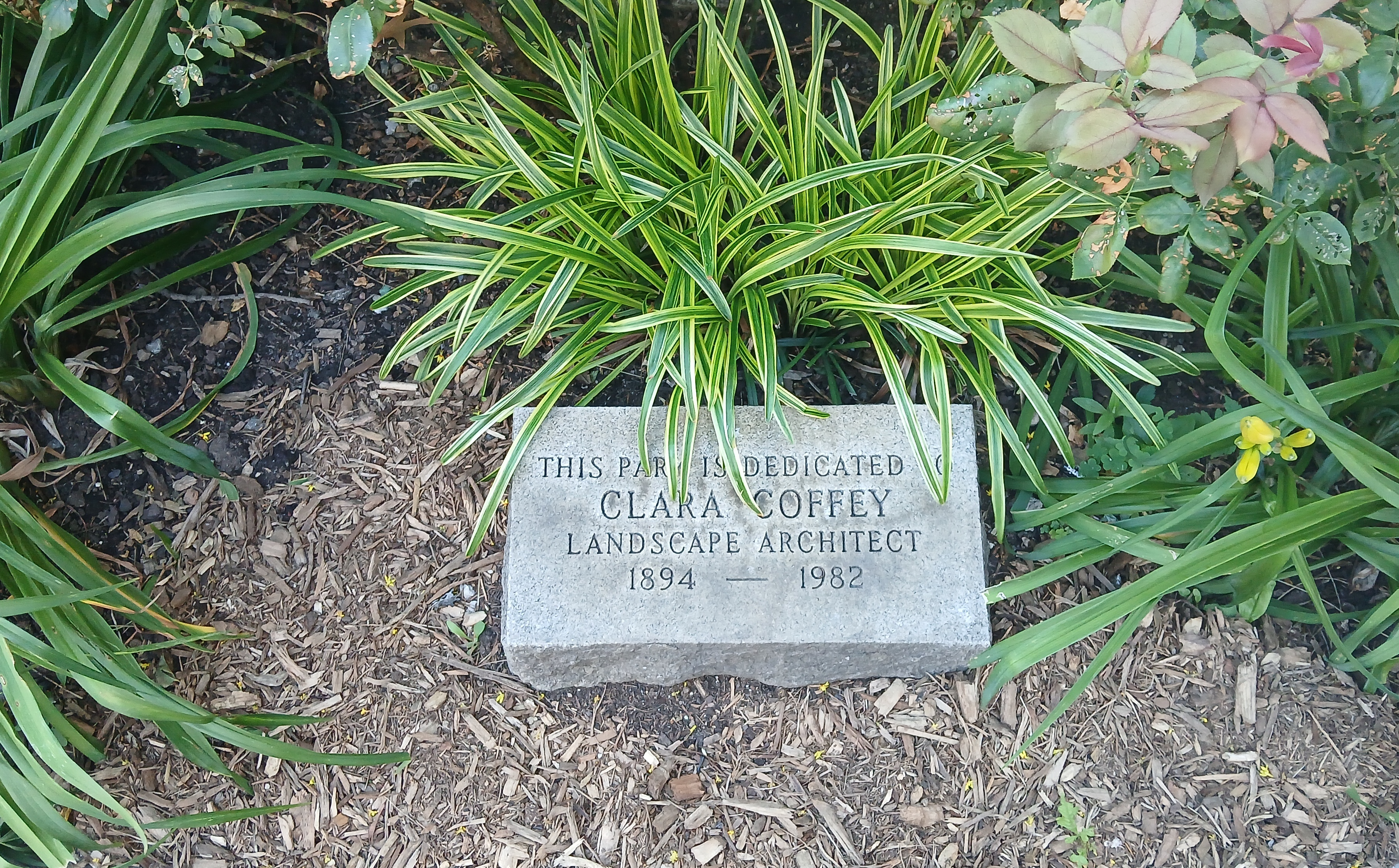
Memorial plaque in Clara Coffey Park

New York City Mayor Abraham Beame named her as the landscape architect representative to the Municipal Art Commission in 1977. In 1978 she was named a fellow of the American Society of Landscape Architects.

In 1989, the Parks Department included Coffey in a Tweed Courthouse photographic exhibition honoring twelve women (six sculptors and six landscape architects) who had made contributions to the city's parks. In addition to Coffey, the landscape architects included Beatrix Jones Farrand, Janet Darling Webel, and Maud Sargent. The sculptors included Anna Vaughn Hyatt Huntington, Emma Stebbins, Harriet Whitney Frishmuth, and Sally James Farnham.

Coffey died in 1982; Clara Coffey Park, one of the small parks along York Avenue between 53rd and 59th Streets is named in her honor. A Barre granite memorial marker on Sutton Place South between 53rd and 54th Streets was installed in 1991.
