= May King Van Rensselaer =

American writer and historian (1848–1925)

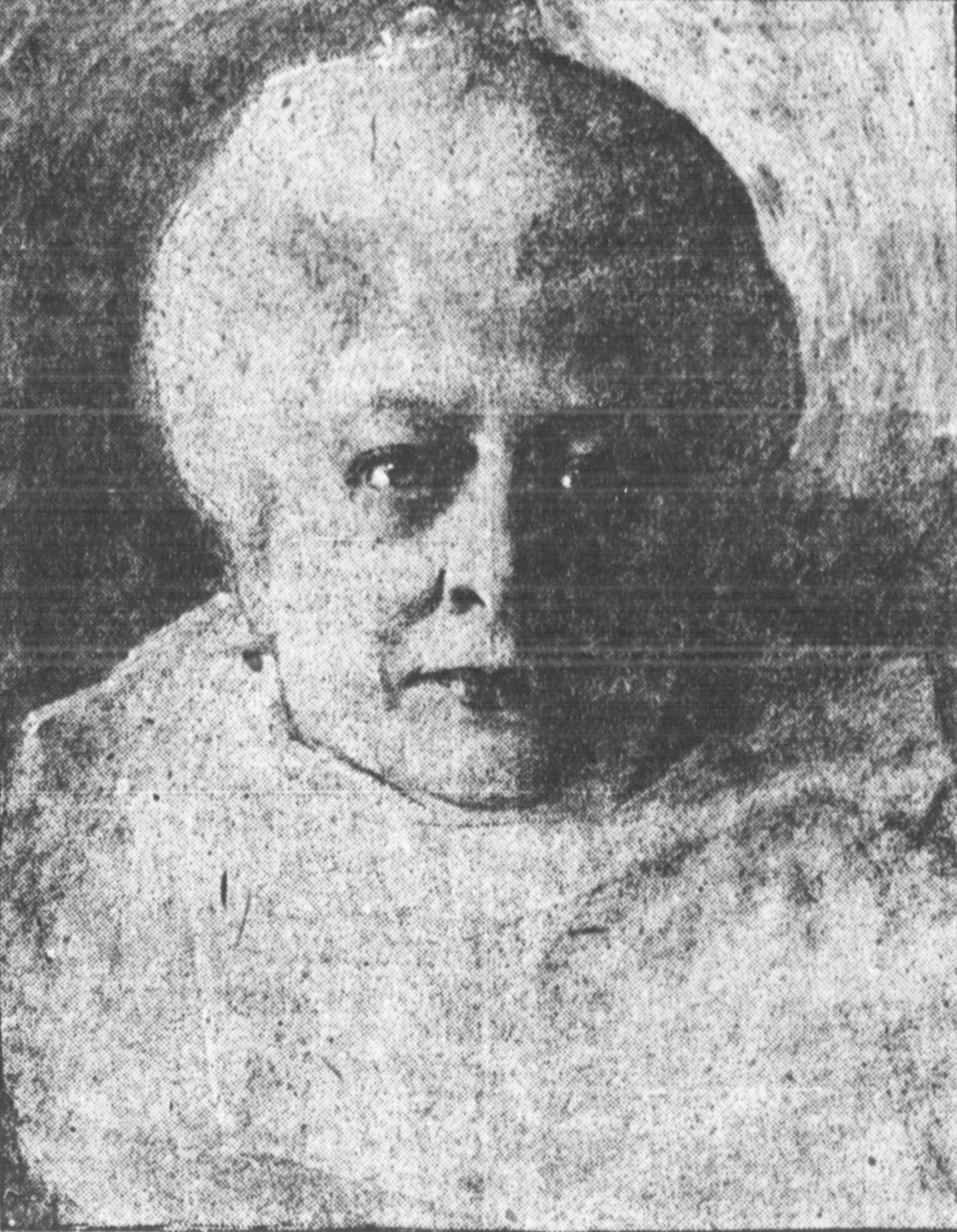
Portrait of May King Van Rensselaer that appeared in The Evening World in 1920.

May King Van Rensselaer (née Maria Denning King; May 25, 1848 – May 11, 1925), was an American author, historian and prominent member of the New York Historical Society. She was instrumental in the founding of the Museum of the City of New York.

== Early life ==
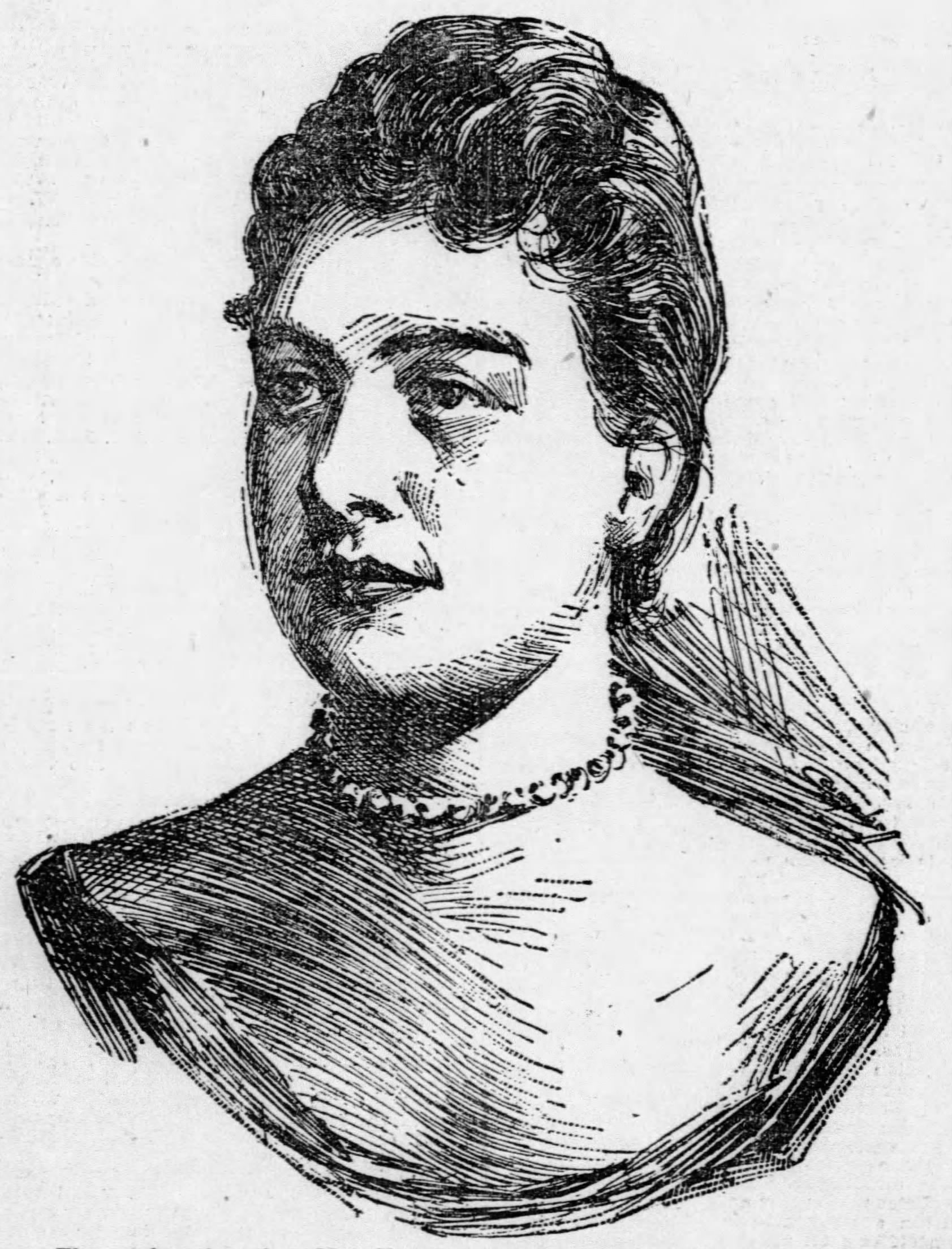
1898 sketch of May King Van Rensselaer

May was born Maria Denning King in New York City on May 25, 1848. Her parents were Archibald Gracie King, a prominent banker, and Elizabeth Denning King (née Duer). Van Rensselaer was born into a prominent New York family; her relatives and ancestors included Edward King, John Alsop, William Alexander Duer, Rufus King, and Katherine Duer Mackay.

== Career ==
In 1882, her first book on crochet lace was published followed by The Devil's Picture Book in 1887, a "wittily presented treatise on playing cards." Her first genealogical book, The Van Rensselaers of the Manor, a study of her husband's family, was published in 1889. This was followed by The Goede Vrouw of Mana-ha-ta, a "description of the housewives of old New York."

By 1911, Van Rensselaer's playing card collection of over 900 decks was the largest in the world.

=== Founding of the Museum of the City of New York ===
In 1917, Van Rensselaer delivered a speech at the annual meeting of the New York Historical Society in which she criticized the Society's lack of passion and organization.

The New York Times quoted her as saying, "I have been attending the meetings of the New-York Historical Society for nearly three years, and have not heard one new or advanced scientific thought, although many distinguished scholars have visited the city." She continued by remarking that "instead of an imposing edifice filled with treasures from old New York, what do we find? Only a deformed monstrosity filled with curiosities, ill arranged and badly assorted."

Some scholars credit Van Rensselaer's speech as spurring on the founding of the Museum of the City of New York, which officially opened six years later in 1923. The Museum was initially housed in Gracie Mansion, the former country home of her father, Archibald Gracie. The, Gracie Mansion has since become the official residence of the Mayor of New York City.

Van Rensselaer was also a founding member of the Colonial Dames of America.

== Personal life ==
On October 4, 1871, she married John King Van Rensselaer, president of the Stirling Fire Insurance Company. He was a son of U.S. Representative Henry Bell Van Rensselaer and grandson of Stephen Van Rensselaer III. The couple had two sons:

- John Alexander Van Rensselaer (b. 1872), who married Helen F. Galindo in 1896, and who was arrested in 1908 for attempting to extort $5,000 from his mother.
- Frederick Harold Van Rensselaer (1874–1903), who married Josephine Lucy Grinnell, a daughter of Robert Minturn Grinnell and Sophie Van Alen, in 1898.

She died on May 11, 1925, at 70 East 92nd Street, her residence in New York City. After a funeral at Grace Episcopal Church in Jamaica, Queens, she was buried in the surrounding cemetery where five generations of the King family were buried. At her death, her estate was worth $19,129, of which $3,843, along with some silver worth $503, was left in trust to her surviving son, and the remainder, $14,873, was left to her granddaughter, Sylvia Grinnell (née Van Rensselear) Sewall.

== Bibliography ==
- The Van Rensselaers of the Manor of Rensselaerswyck (1888)
- The Devil's Picture-Books (1890)
- The Goede Vrouw of Mana-ha-ta: At Home and in Society 1609-1760 (1898)
- Prophetical, Educational and Playing Cards (1912)
- The Social Ladder (1924, with Frederic Van de Water)
