= Mount Vernon Hotel Museum =

- Mount Vernon Hotel Museum and Garden
- U.S. National Register of Historic Places
- New York State Register of Historic Places
- New York City Landmark
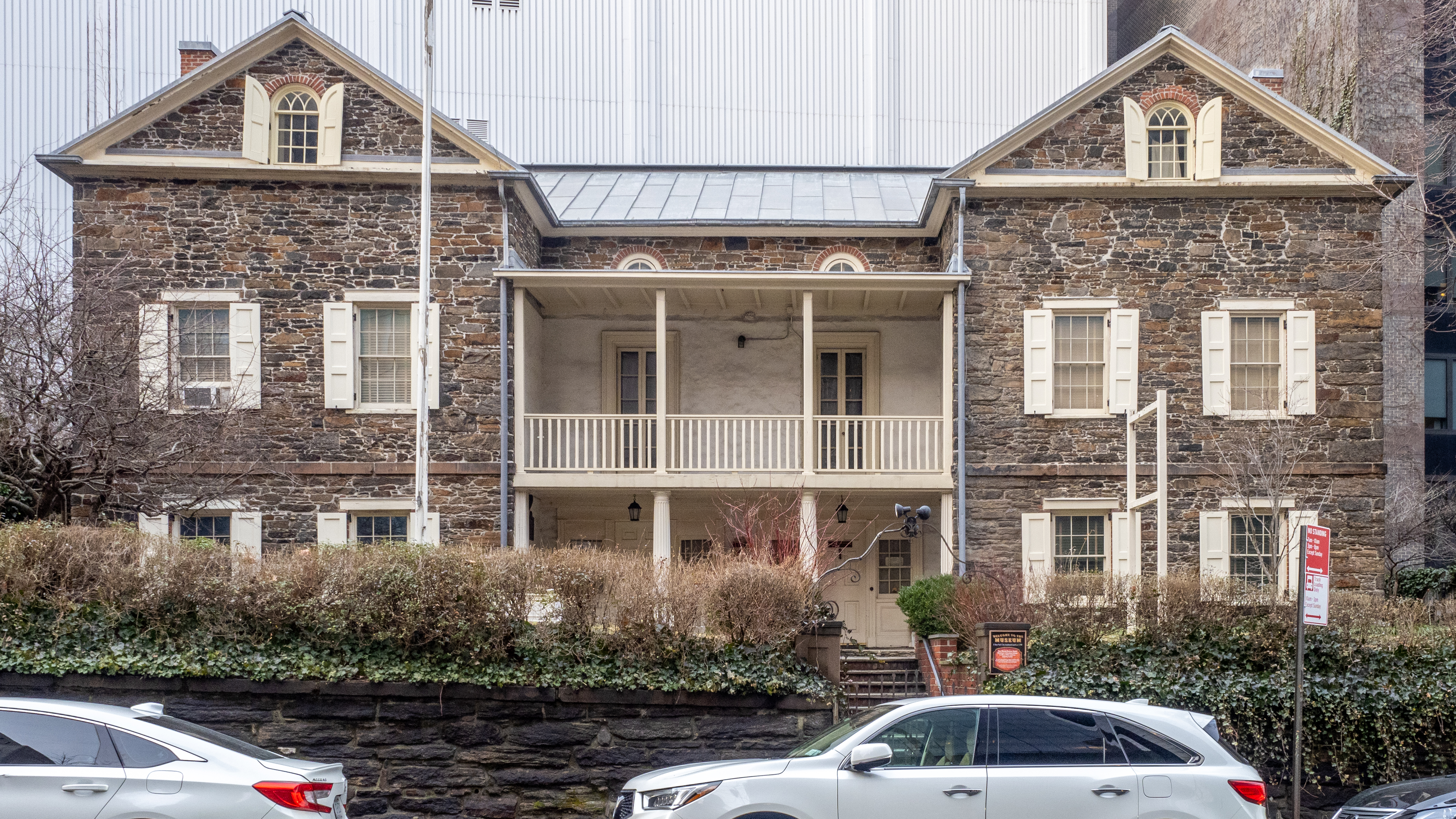
- Location: 421 East 61st Street, Manhattan, New York City, New York, USA
- Coordinates: 40°45′38″N 73°57′35″W
- Built: 1799
- Architectural style: Vernacular Architecture
- NRHP reference No.: 73001223
- NYSRHP No.: 06101.000422
- NYCL No.: 0426

Significant dates
- Added to NRHP: January 12, 1973
- Designated NYSRHP: June 23, 1980
- Designated NYCL: January 24, 1967

The Mount Vernon Hotel Museum & Garden, formerly the Abigail Adams Smith Museum, is a historic antebellum building at 421 East 61st Street, near the East River, on the Upper East Side of Manhattan in New York City. It is open to the public as a museum. Since 1924, it has been operated by the Colonial Dames of America. As of May 2025, the museum is open for tours on selected weekdays.

== History ==
=== Use as hotel ===
View of E. 61st St., c. 1850.

One of the few remaining pre-1800 buildings in Manhattan, the house was originally planned in 1795 as an estate for Colonel William S. Smith and his wife, Abigail. The Smiths never completed the building; it was ultimately built as a carriage house and stable in 1799 for the nearby estate of William T. Robinson. Joseph Coleman Hart bought the house and converted it into a day hotel in 1826.

The Mount Vernon Hotel operated in a city experiencing huge commercial growth after the opening of the Erie Canal. Its location offered guests a respite from the dirt, noise, and bustle of city life. In the 1830s, the commercial shipping and business districts of New York City lay below City Hall, while private residences extended as far north as modern-day Chelsea, and it was common for upper- and middle-class residents and visitors to take day trips to the then-rural setting that is now midtown Manhattan. One of over 50 day hotels in or near New York City, the Mount Vernon attracted middle-class guests with leisure activities such as boating trips, tours of unusual exhibitions and social events. In a city without public parks or public libraries, these day hotels offered "gentlemen and their families" an escape from the explosive growth of New York City's population and ensuing urbanization (the population of New York City, 123,706 in 1820, had grown to 202,589 by 1830). They could spend a quiet day near the river and be home downtown by sunset.

Frances Trollope and James Stuart, a Scottish diarist, are two foreign travelers who visited New York City during the time when the Mount Vernon Hotel operated under Hart. Stuart recorded his 1829 stay at the Mount Vernon Hotel in his Three Years in North America (1833).

The Mount Vernon Hotel operated until 1833, when it was purchased by Jeremiah Towle, who converted it to a private residence. His daughters continued to live in the house through 1905, when the Standard Gas Light Company bought the house and erected gas tanks nearby. The house was then bought by Jane Teller Robinson in 1919. The Colonial Dames of America purchased the site in 1924 to use as its headquarters.

=== Use as museum ===
In 1939, the house opened to the public as the Abigail Adams Smith Museum. The planting plan for the Abigail Adams Smith Museum gardens was by New York landscape designer Alice Recknagel Ireys and Georgian landscape designer Kate Basilashvili.

In the early 2000s, there was an unsuccessful attempt to rebrand the area around the museum as "Mount Vernon". At the time, the surrounding blocks were not given a specific name (unlike other parts of the Upper East Side), and much of the former Mount Vernon estate had been demolished to make way for the Queensboro Bridge, which had opened in 1908. This area is considered part of the Upper East Side or Lenox Hill.

== Current management ==
The museum is currently owned and operated by the Colonial Dames of America.

=== Public programs ===
The museum tells the story of New York City's tremendous period of growth following the completion of the Erie Canal in 1825, two years after the Mount Vernon Hotel opened. Guided tours, public programs, and other educational programs are offered. The museum is open to the public Monday through Friday for docent-led tours of the period rooms and garden. The museum provides school field trips and hosts an average of 35 programs throughout the year, including Lunchtime Lectures, Children's Storytime, summer concerts, and History Weeks for school-aged children. Annual events include the Halloween Murder Mystery and Candlelight Holiday Tours.

=== Ongoing research ===
Each summer, Hearst Fellows conduct original research on aspects of New York history and daily life, including trade, travel, leisure, education, urban development, popular music, and gender and race relationships of the 1820s–30s.

== See also ==
- List of New York City Designated Landmarks in Manhattan from 59th to 110th Streets
- National Register of Historic Places listings in Manhattan from 59th to 110th Streets
