= Haffen Park =

Public park in the Bronx, New York, US

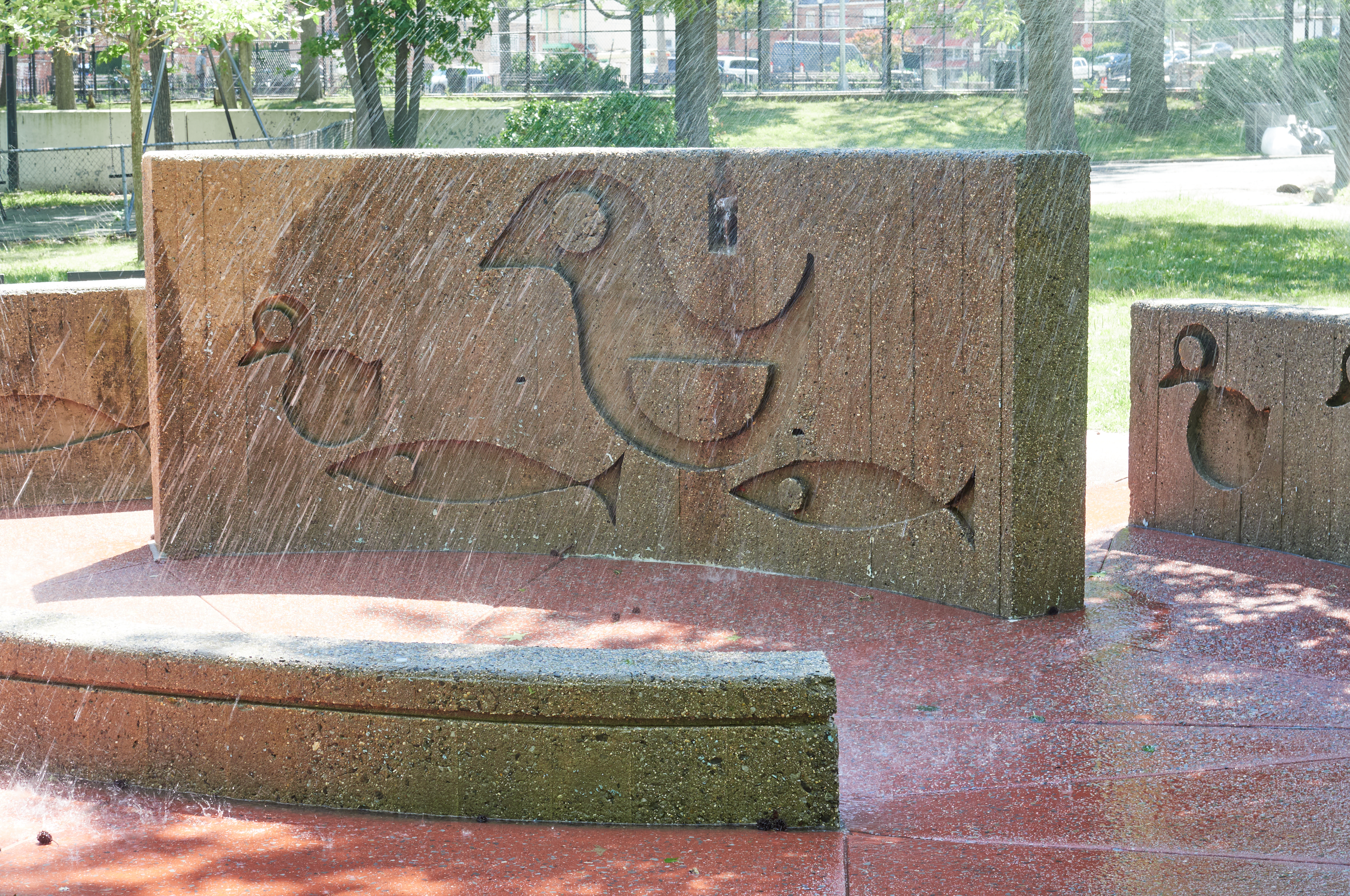
- Interactive map of Haffen Park
- Location: Northeast Bronx
- Coordinates: 40.8739°N 73.8392°W
- Area: 9.42 acres (3.81 ha)

Haffen Park is a 9.24-acre (3.74 ha) public park in the northeast Bronx, New York City. The park is named after Louis F. Haffen, the first borough president of the Bronx. It is bordered by Burke, Ely, Hammersley, and Gunther Avenues.

The park was officially created in 1958 when New York City acquired the land. Actual construction did not begin, however, until more than a decade later. In June 1966, local homeowners held a rally attended by Councilman Mario Merola at the site of the proposed park protesting the construction delays. A meeting with Borough President Herman Badillo had been held April at which it was promised that construction would begin in July, but it was later announced that delays would push that back to some time in 1967. A follow-up rally was held in July, with 600 people showing up to begin work on their own, removing weeds and clearing away debris using tools supplied by State Senator John Calandra.

The park was designed by Clara Stimson Coffey with groundbreaking in May 1969. Facilities include picnic and play areas, tennis, handball, basketball, and baseball. There are also swimming and wading pools. A $13.4 million project was announced in April 2026 to reconstruct the pool complex, including upgraded locker rooms, showers, restroom and mechanical systems.

The pool facilities were not in the original 1958 plans; they were added during a c. 1970 renovation funded by the Land and Water Conservation Fund. Additional renovations were in 1996 and 2006, the latter funded by the Croton Water Filtration Facility as part of their parkland mitigation program.

In 2007, children's character Hip Hop Harry performed at the park for an audience of 500 pre-teen summer campers. The large yellow bear with a pear-shaped body and no knees rapped about personal hygiene and hand washing accompanied by break dancers.
