= Edward King (New York banker) =

American banker (1833–1908)

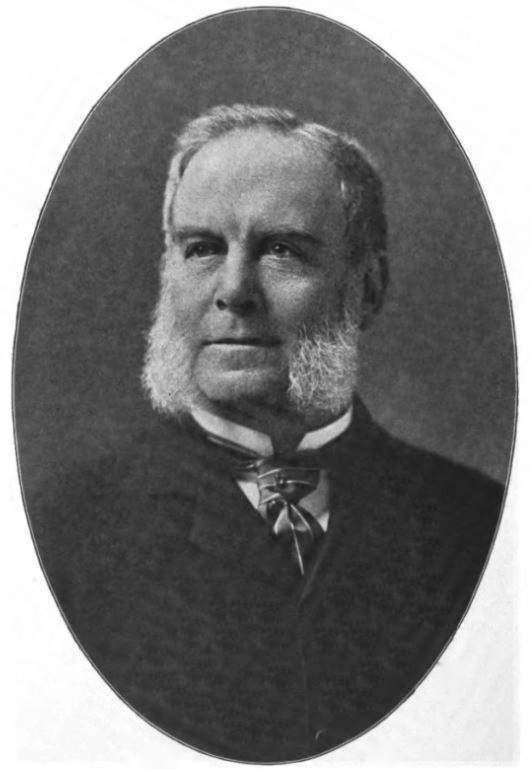

34th President of the Saint Nicholas Society of the City of New York
- In office 1896–1897
- Preceded by: Chauncey Mitchell Depew
- Succeeded by: Stiles Franklin Stanton

Personal details
- Born: July 30, 1833 Weehawken, New Jersey, U.S.
- Died: November 18, 1908 (aged 75) New York City, U.S.
- Spouse(s): Isabella Ramsay Cochrane (m. 1858; died 1873) Elizabeth Fisher (m. 1885)
- Children: 7
- Parent(s): James G. King; Sarah Rogers Gracie King
- Relatives: A. Gracie King (brother); Rufus King (grandfather); Archibald Gracie (grandfather)
- Education: Columbia Grammar School
- Alma mater: Harvard University

Edward King (July 30, 1833 – November 18, 1908) was an American banker who served as president of the New York Stock Exchange and president of the Saint Nicholas Society of the City of New York.

== Early life ==
King was born on February 5, 1839, at "Highwood," his father's country estate near Weehawken, New Jersey. He was the tenth of eleven children born to Sarah Rogers (née Gracie) King and James G. King. Among his siblings was banker Archibald Gracie King. At the time of his birth, his father was serving as President of New York and Erie Railroad and later became a U.S. Representative from New Jersey.

His paternal grandparents were Mary (née Alsop) King, a daughter of John Alsop (a prominent merchant and Continental Congressman) and Rufus King, the first U.S. Senator from New York and the 3rd and 8th U.S. Minister to the United Kingdom (under Presidents George Washington, John Adams, Thomas Jefferson and John Quincy Adams). His maternal grandfather was Archibald Gracie, a Scottish-born shipping magnate and early American businessman and merchant in New York City and Virginia.

King was educated at Columbia Grammar School, later attending a French school in New York run by Peugnet (a former officer under Napoleon). He later went to Europe and studied at a school in Meiningen in the Province of Saxony. He returned to the United States in 1849 and attended Harvard University, graduating in 1853.

== Career ==
After graduating from Harvard, he took lessons in engineering from Professor Mahan at West Point before joining his father's banking house, James G. King's Sons, in 1854. He began as a clerk, eventually became a partner in the bank and then withdrew in 1861 to found his own brokerage business, having been a member of the New York Stock Exchange (of which he served as president in 1872). In 1873, he was chosen as president of the Union Trust Company of New York, serving in that role until his death.

King was a member of the Saint Nicholas Society, an organization in New York City of men descended from early inhabitants of the State of New York. From 1896 to 1897, he served as the 34th president of the organization. His uncle, John Alsop King, had served as president of the organization in 1848 and 1849. He also served as a governor of the New York Hospital, a trustee of the New York Society Library, a trustee of the New York Public Library, and former president of the Harvard Club of New York. He was also a member of the University Club, the Century Association, the Riding Club and the Ardsley Club.

== Personal life ==
On October 20, 1858, King was married to Isabella Ramsay Cochrane (1838–1873). Isabella was the daughter of Rupert John Cochran and Isabella Macomb (née Clarke) Cochrane. Together, they resided at 1 University Place in New York City and were the parents of six children, including:

- Alice Bayard King (1864–1943), who married Herman LeRoy Edgar, a son of William Edgar and Eliza (née Rhinelander) Edgar, in 1891.
- James Gore King (1868–1932), who married Sarah Erving, a daughter of John Erving and Cornelia (née Van Rensselaer) Erving, in 1896.
- Rupert Cochrane King (1873–1918), who married Grace Marvin, a daughter of Selden Marvin and Catharine (née Parker) Marvin, in 1901.

After the death of his first wife on March 1, 1873, he remarried to Elizabeth Fisher (1847–1937), a daughter of William and Julia (née Palmer) Fisher of Philadelphia, on May 26, 1885. Together, they were the parents of one child, a son:

- Edward King (b. 1886), who married Mary Gillett, daughter of Dr. Charles Gillett.

After a two-week illness, King died in New York City on November 18, 1908.
