= Juliet Marshall Blackburn Williams =

American civic leader

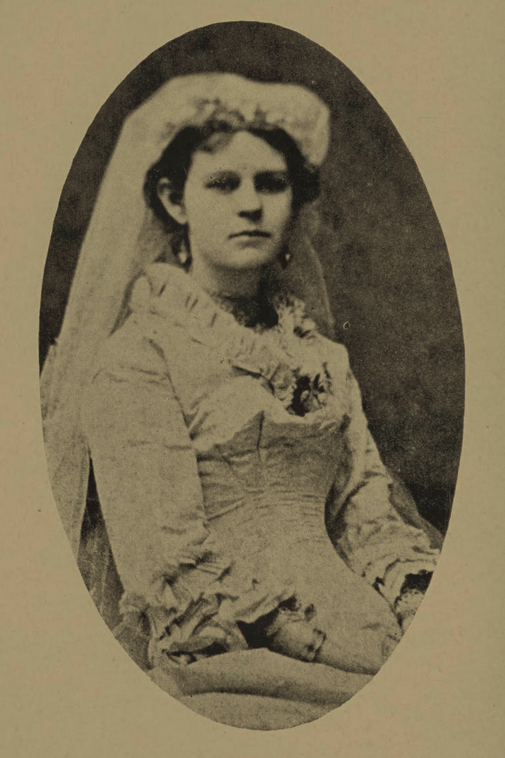
- Born: Juliet Marshall Blackburn; April 27, 1857; Bowling Green, Kentucky, U.S.
- Died: December 18, 1928 (aged 71); Atlanta, Georgia, U.S.
- Resting place: Oakland Cemetery
- Spouse: William Fort Williams
- Children: 3

Juliet Marshall Blackburn Williams (April 27, 1857 – December 18, 1928), also known as Mrs. William Fort Williams, was an American civic leader who served as the first vice president of the Confederate Memorial Association of Atlanta.

== Early life and family ==
Williams was born in Bowling Green, Kentucky. She was the daughter of General Samuel Daviess Williams. Her father, a scientist and lawyer, was a member of the secession convention in Rusellville. She grew up in a large stately home in Bowling Green but, during the Civil War, the family vacated the home so that it could be used as a headquarters for General Albert Sidney Johnson.

== Civic activity ==
Williams was a member of the Colonial Dames of America, the Daughters of the American Revolution, and the United Daughters of the Confederacy. She was an ardent supporter of the Confederate cause during the Civil War and the subsequent Lost Cause narrative. She served as second vice president and as first vice president of the Confederate Memorial Association of Atlanta and twice represented the Atlanta association at the Convention of the Confederate Memorial Association.

== Personal life ==
After marrying William Fort Williams, the son of Atlanta mayor James E. Williams, she moved to Georgia. They had three children.
