= Colonial Dames of America =

Nonprofit organization

- The Society of the Colonial Dames of America
- The Colonial Dames of America logo

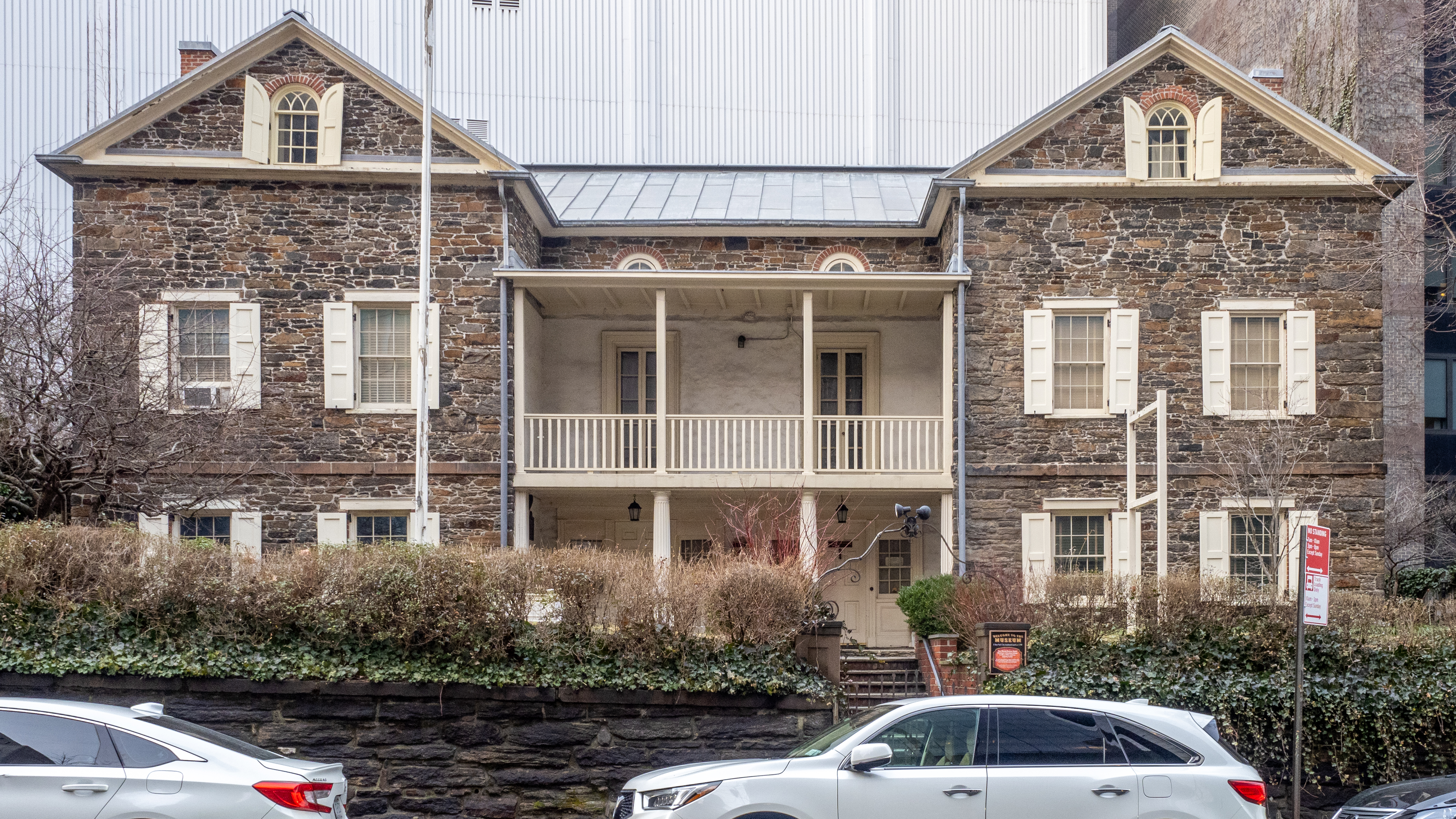
- Mount Vernon Hotel Museum in New York City
- Abbreviation: CDA
- Founded: 1890
- Founders: Maria Denning Van Rensselaer
- Type: Non-profit, lineage society
- Purpose: Historic preservation, education, patriotism
- Headquarters: Mount Vernon Hotel Museum, New York City, New York, United States
- Executive Director: Nicole Scholet
- Website: cda1890.org

The Colonial Dames of America (CDA) is an American organization comprising women who descend from one or more ancestors who lived in British North America between 1607 and 1775, and who aided the colonies in public office, in military service, or in another acceptable capacity. The CDA is listed as an approved lineage society with the Hereditary Society Community of the United States of America.

The National Headquarters is at Mount Vernon Hotel Museum in New York City, a building purchased by the CDA in 1924.

== History ==
The organization was founded in 1890, shortly before the founding of two similar societies, The National Society of the Colonial Dames of America and the Daughters of the American Revolution. In April 1890, Mrs. John King Van Rensselaer (Maria Denning Van Rensselaer), Mrs. John Lyon Gardiner, and Mrs. Archibald Gracie King decided to found a patriotic society of women descended from Colonial ancestry.

The original CDA insignia was designed by Tiffany & Co.

== Notable members ==
- Lillie Stella Acer Ballagh, founder of Matinee Musical Club, Los Angeles
- Fanny Yarborough Bickett (1870–1941), First Lady of North Carolina and first female president of the North Carolina Railroad
- Dianne Cannestra, quilter and President National of the United States Daughters of 1812
- Margaret Ann Scruggs Carruth (1892–1988), etcher, printmaker, illustrator and educator
- Florence Anderson Clark (1835–1918), author, newspaper editor, librarian, university dean
- Cynthia Beverley Tucker Washington Coleman (1832–1908), writer and preservationist in Williamsburg, Virginia.
- Elizabeth Jarvis Colt, businesswoman and philanthropist; founder of the Connecticut chapter of CDA
- Pauline Smith Crenshaw (1878–1956), historian, co-founder and president of the Montgomery Museum of Fine Arts
- Addie Worth Bagley Daniels (1869–1943), suffragist, writer, and socialite
- Kate Embry Dowdle Davis (1871–1954), President National of the U.S. Daughters of 1812
- Susan Topliff Davis (1862–1931), non-profit executive
- Julia Livingston Delafield (1837–1914), philanthropist and historian
- Laura Dayton Fessenden (1852–1924), author
- Laura Montgomery Henderson (1867–1940), First Lady of Alabama and president of the Alabama Federation of Women's Clubs
- Emma Blood French (1853–1932), philanthropist
- Sallie Foster Harshbarger, active in civic and fraternal work
- Mary Hilliard Hinton, historian, painter, anti-suffragist, and white supremacist
- Sarah McKelley King (1921–2013), 33rd President General of the Daughters of the American Revolution
- Alice Curtice Moyer
- Dale Mercer, socialite and television personality
- Jeannie Blackburn Moran (1842/50–1929), author, community leader, socialite, and philanthropist; CDA charter member
- Edith Allen Phelps, twice president of the Oklahoma Library Association, the first professional in the Library Science field in the Oklahoma City system
- Adelaide Hamilton (1830–1915), last surviving granddaughter of Alexander Hamilton. She joined the organisation when it was first launched.
- Katie Cabell Currie Muse (1861–1927), President General of the United Daughters of the Confederacy
- Katherine Bissell Roe (died 1921), socialite
- Leonora St. George Rogers Schuyler (1868–1952), President General of the United Daughters of the Confederacy
- Betty Newkirk Seimes, 27th President General of the Daughters of the American Revolution
- Florence Warfield Sillers, historian and socialite
- Daisy Allen Story, socialite, suffragist, and clubwoman
- May Erwin Talmadge, 19th President General of the Daughters of the American Revolution
- Fay Webb-Gardner, First Lady of North Carolina
- Juliet Marshall Blackburn Williams (1857–1928), civic leader
- Lynn Forney Young, lineage society leader
