= Pauline Smith Crenshaw =

American clubwoman

- Born: Pauline Elizabeth Smith; November 5, 1878; Montgomery, Alabama, U.S.
- Died: December 11, 1956 (aged 78); Montgomery, Alabama, U.S.
- Occupations: clubwoman, genealogist, museum founder
- Spouse: Hervey Files Crenshaw Sr.
- Children: 3

Pauline Elizabeth Smith Crenshaw (November 5, 1878 – December 11, 1956) was an American clubwoman, socialite, and genealogist. She co-founded the Montgomery Museum of Fine Arts in 1930 and served as its president from 1944 to 1953. She was a member of multiple lineage and genealogical societies and published a comprehensive history on her family, titled From Then Until Now, in 1938.

== Biography ==
Crenshaw was born Pauline Elizabeth Smith on November 5, 1878, in Montgomery, Alabama to Lester Chauncey Smith and Annie Jackson Smith. She descended from early pioneers.

She married Hervey Files Crenshaw on December 26, 1900. They had three children.

In 1930, Crenshaw co-founded the Montgomery Museum of Fine Arts, the first fine arts museum in Alabama. She served as the museum's president from 1944 to 1953.

She was a prominent society figure in Montgomery and was a member of the Sophie Bibb Chapter of the United Daughters of the Confederacy, the Colonial Dames of America, the Daughters of the Crown, and the Frances Marion Chapter of the Daughters of the American Revolution; the latter of which she served as Regent. Crenshaw was a member of the American Genealogy Society and, in 1938, she published a comprehensive history on her family titled From Then Until Now.

Crenshaw was a member of First Presbyterian Church in Montgomery.

She died at her home on Carter Hill Road in Montgomery on December 11, 1956.
