= James G. King =

American politician (1791–1853)

James Gore King
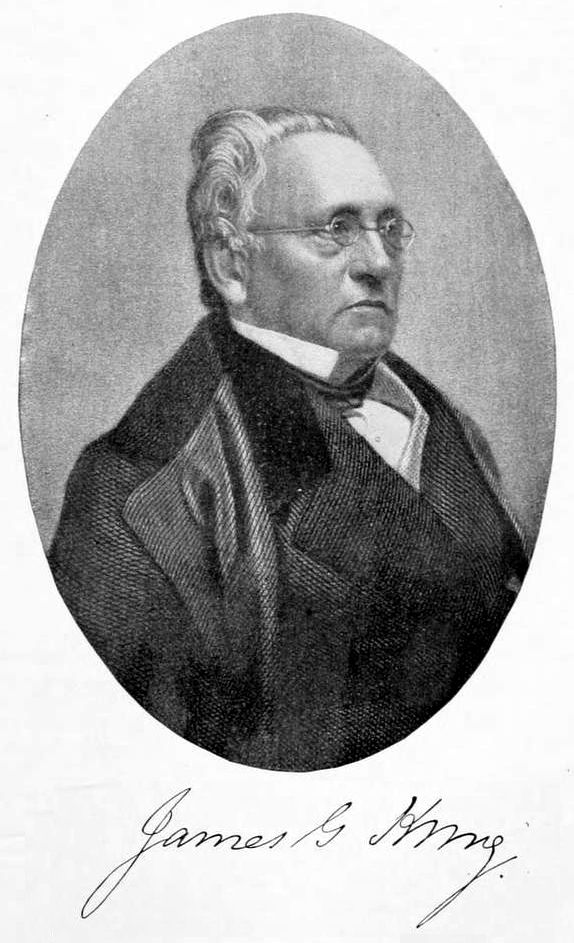

Member of the U.S. House of Representatives from New Jersey's 5th district
- In office March 4, 1849 – March 3, 1851
- Preceded by: Dudley S. Gregory
- Succeeded by: Rodman M. Price

Personal details
- Born: James Gore King; May 8, 1791 New York City, U.S.
- Died: October 3, 1853 (aged 62) Weehawken, New Jersey, U.S.
- Resting place: Grace Church, Jamaica, New York
- Party: Whig
- Spouse: Sarah Rogers Gracie (m. 1813)
- Children: 11, including Archibald and Edward
- Parent(s): Rufus King; Mary Alsop
- Relatives: John A. King (brother); Charles King (brother); Edward King (brother); John Alsop (grandfather); Archibald Gracie (father-in-law)
- Education: Harvard College; Litchfield Law School

James Gore King (May 8, 1791 – October 3, 1853) was an American businessman and Whig Party politician who represented New Jersey's 5th congressional district in the United States House of Representatives for one term from 1849 to 1851.

== Early life and education ==
King was born in New York City on May 8, 1791, at the residence of his maternal grandfather. He was the third son of Mary (née Alsop) King and Rufus King. Among his siblings were brothers John Alsop King, who served as Governor of New York, and Charles King, the president of Columbia University, and Edward King, an Ohio politician.

His father served as the first U.S. Senator from New York and was the 3rd and 8th U.S. Minister to the United Kingdom under Presidents George Washington, John Adams, Thomas Jefferson and John Quincy Adams.

His paternal grandparents were Isabella (née Bragdon) King and Richard King, a prosperous farmer-merchant. Among his extended family were uncles William King, who served as the first Governor of Maine, and Cyrus King, who was a U.S. Representative from Massachusetts. His mother was the only child of his maternal grandparents, Mary (née Frogat) Alsop and John Alsop, a prominent merchant and Continental Congressman.

He pursued classical studies in England and France, returned to United States and graduated from Harvard University in 1810. He studied law under Peter van Schaack of Kinderhook, followed by study at the Litchfield Law School in Connecticut.

== Career ==
During the War of 1812, he served as assistant adjutant general of the New York Militia, under Major General Ebenezer Stevens.

After the war, he opened a commission house in New York City with his father-in-law, Archibald Gracie, under the name James G. King and Company. Three years later in 1818, he moved to Liverpool, England, and established King & Gracie with his brother-in-law, Archibald Gracie Jr., where he established "a high reputation for business ability, and, despite the severe financial crisis of 1822, 1823, and 1824, was able to meet all his obligations and to finally close up the affairs of his house on a satisfactory basis." While in Liverpool, he met and eventually became a close friend of John Jacob Astor (later serving as an executor of his will), who offered him the presidency of the American Fur Company, which King declined.

=== Business career ===
In 1824, he returned to New York City and engaged in banking as a partner in the firm of Prime & Ward (thereafter Prime, Ward & King), with residence in Weehawken, New Jersey. In 1835, he succeeded Eleazar Lord to become president of the Erie Railroad, although he did not collect a salary. He served until 1837, when by his visit to London he secured the loan to American bankers of $1,000,000 (~$28.7 million in 2024) from the governors of the Bank of England.

=== Tenure in United States Congress ===
In 1834, he was a candidate for Congress in New York City, but was defeated.

King was elected as a Whig to Congress, succeeding fellow Whig Dudley S. Gregory, the former mayor of Jersey City. He served alongside his older brother John in office from March 4, 1849, to March 3, 1851, but declined to be a candidate for renomination in 1850 and was succeeded by Democrat Rodman M. Price (who later served as the 17th Governor of New Jersey after leaving Congress in 1853). While in Congress, he was a member of the Committee of Commerce, and he opposed the repeal of the Missouri Compromise and the Fugitive Slave Act of 1850.

Upon the ascendancy of Millard Fillmore to the presidency after Zachary Taylor's death in 1850, King was reportedly considered for United States Secretary of the Treasury, but informed Fillmore that he did not wish to serve as he had planned on retiring from public service and was, in fact, leaving Congress at the end of the term.

=== Later career ===
After leaving Congress, he resumed the banking business. By this time the firm he had worked for had undergone dissolution, and so was succeeded by the House of James G. King & Son.

== Personal life ==
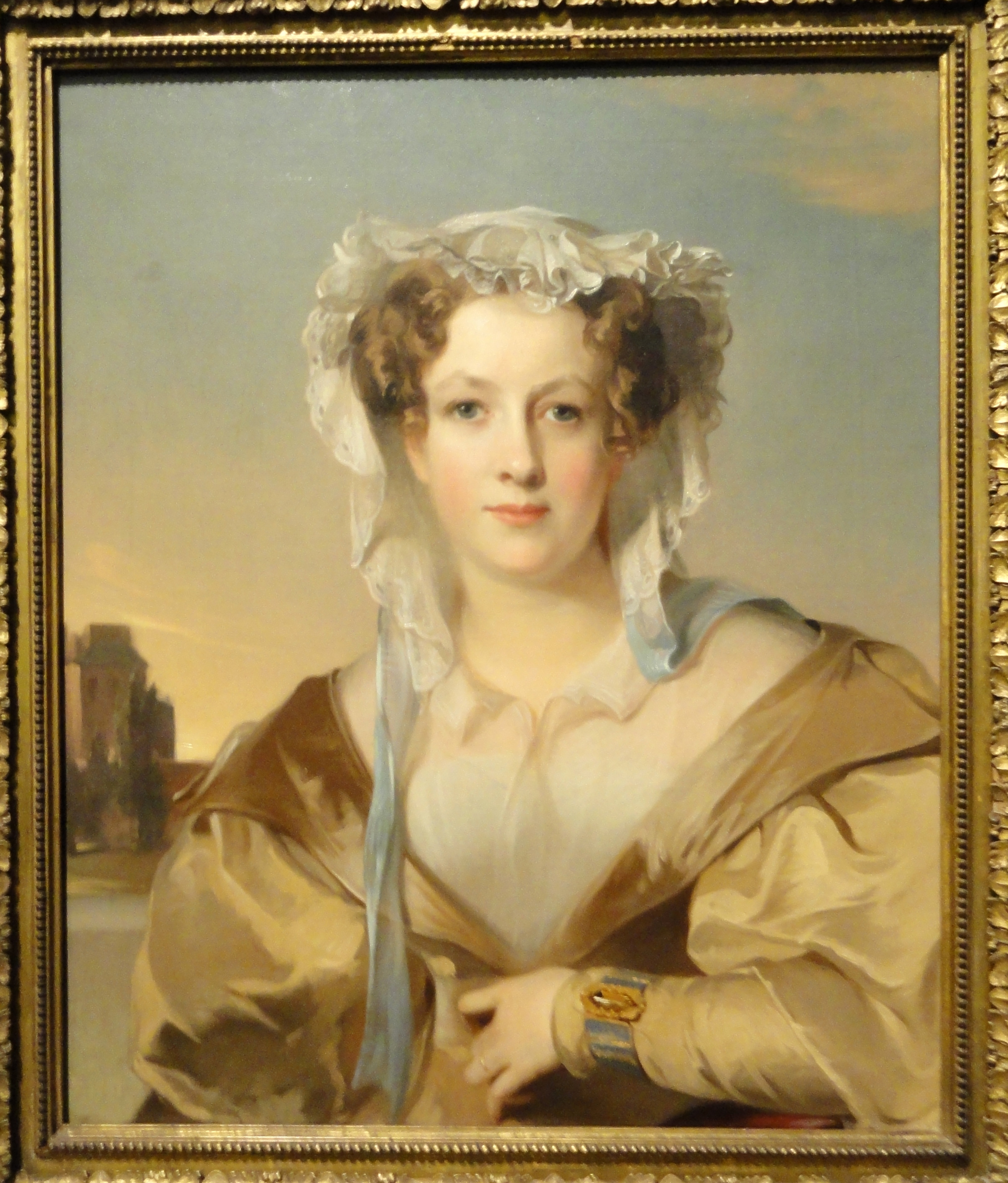
Portrait of his wife, Sarah Rogers Gracie King, by Thomas Sully, 1831

On February 4, 1813, King was married to Sarah Rogers Gracie (1791–1878), the daughter of Archibald Gracie, a Scottish-born shipping magnate and early American businessman and merchant in New York City and Virginia. Together, they were the parents of eleven children, many of whom married into prominent colonial families, including:

- Caroline King (1813–1863), who married Denning Duer, a son of William Alexander Duer.
- James Gore King Jr. (1819–1867), justice of the New York Supreme Court who married his first cousin, Caroline King, a daughter of John Alsop King.
- Archibald Gracie King (1821–1897), who married Elizabeth Denning Duer, a daughter of William Alexander Duer.
- Mary King (1826–1890), who married Edgar Henry Richards in 1856.
- Frederika Gore King (1829–1916), who married Bancroft Davis, an American lawyer, judge, diplomat, and president of Newburgh and New York Railway Company.
- Edward King (1833–1908), who married Isabella Ramsay Cochrane in 1858. After her death, he married Elizabeth Fisher.
- Fanny King (1836–1905), who married James Latimer McLane, brother of Robert Milligan McLane, in 1859.

=== Death and burial ===
King died of a "congestion of the lungs" on October 3, 1853, at his country place, "Highwood," near Weehawken, New Jersey, which he had purchased in 1832. He was interred in the churchyard of Grace Church, Jamaica, New York.

=== Descendants ===
Through his son Archibald, he was the grandfather of May Denning King (1848–1925), who married John King Van Rensselaer, a son of Henry Bell Van Rensselaer and grandson of Stephen Van Rensselaer III, the patroon of Rensselaerwyck. His great-great-granddaughter Ellin Travers Mackay married Irving Berlin. Another great-great-grandchild was Wolcott Gibbs, who was also a direct descendant of Martin Van Buren (James Gore King's grandson married Martin Van Buren's granddaughter, and Wolcott Gibbs was their grandson).

Through his youngest daughter Fanny, he was the grandfather of Robert McLane, who served as the 32nd Mayor of Baltimore.

Business positions
Preceded by Eleazar Lord	President of New York and Erie Railroad; 1835 – 1839	Succeeded by Eleazar Lord
U.S. House of Representatives
Preceded by Dudley S. Gregory	Member of the U.S. House of Representatives from New Jersey's 5th congressional district 1849 – 1851	Succeeded by Rodman M. Price
