= Alice Recknagel Ireys =

American landscape architect

- Born: Alice Elizabeth Recknagel; April 24, 1911; Brooklyn, New York
- Died: December 12, 2000 (aged 89); Brooklyn, New York
- Education: Cambridge School of Architecture and Landscape Architecture
- Spouse: Henry Tillinghast Ireys III

Alice Recknagel Ireys (April 24, 1911 – December 12, 2000) was an American landscape architect whose notable clients included the Brooklyn Botanic Garden, the New York Botanical Garden, the Clark Botanic Garden, the Abigail Adams Smith Museum, and the Brooklyn Museum.

== Early life and education ==
Alice Elizabeth Recknagel was born in Brooklyn, New York, to Harold S. and Rea Estes Recknagel. Her father was an insurance-industry attorney. The 45 Willow Street townhouse Alice grew up in had been occupied by her family since the 1830s, and she would live there her entire life.

Ireys became interested in gardening as a child by working with her grandfather at a family farm in Green Harbor, Massachusetts. She helped her grandfather in his vegetable garden and was given a small plot of her own in which to grow flowers. Ireys' interest developed further as a result of a program at the Brooklyn Botanic Garden, which itself was under development throughout Ireys' youth, funded by the Burpee seed company that allowed children to grow plants and then take them home. Ireys also volunteered at the Brooklyn Botanic Garden.

Ireys went to school at the Packer Collegiate Institute in Brooklyn and then, at the suggestion of a friend, attended the Cambridge School of Architecture and Landscape Architecture, which was founded by Harvard professors but by 1932 was affiliated with Smith College. Although the Cambridge School ordinarily only admitted women holding a B.A. degree, Recknagel persuaded school founder Henry Atherton Frost that her Packer diploma was the equivalent of a junior college degree and so secured admission. She took four years to complete the three-year program, graduating in 1935.

== Career ==
After earning her certificate from the Cambridge School, Ireys went to work for Packer alumna Marjorie Sewell Cautley in New Jersey. She taught gardening at Silver Lake Camp in Hawkeye, New York in the summer of 1936 and worked at the nursery of W.J. Manning in Duxbury, Massachusetts, in the summer of 1937.

In February 1936, she began working for the landscape architect Charles Lowrie. Lowrie and his staff of five worked mostly on housing developments and public parks. When the Depression forced Lowrie to let most of the staff go, he kept Ireys on. Out of necessity, she learned to do a bit of everything around the office, including typing, filing, cleaning, and errands as well as rendering, "inking," and visiting job sites. It was an experience she later described as "a wonderful way to learn." When Lowrie died suddenly in September 1939, Ireys was asked to take over his clients, but only five of them agreed to stay with her. One project she completed was the planting plan for the Red Hook Housing Project in Brooklyn.

After Lowrie's death, Ireys pieced together a variety of jobs, from giving gardening talks on the radio and writing articles for newspapers to working in collaboration with Cambridge School alumnae Cynthia Wiley and Clara Coffey. With Wiley and Coffey, she designed playgrounds for the New York City Parks Department and landscape plans for housing in New York City, Niagara Falls, New Rochelle, Detroit, and New Jersey. She also did special projects for landscape architects Arthur F. Brinckerhoff and A. Carl Stelling and architects Lorimer Rich (for whom she made a planting plan for the Tomb of the Unknowns) and I. Naftali. In the spring of 1941 and the fall of 1943 she taught a landscape gardening course at Connecticut College. After the birth of her first child, Ireys closed the Manhattan office and set up shop at her lifelong home on Willow Street.

Ireys became known for a design aesthetic that bridged between the late 19th century ideal of the gracious formal estate and the 20th century concern for modest residential landscaping and enhanced public spaces. She borrowed elements such as terraces and parterres from large-scale landscaping and modified them for more limited acreage, emphasizing such features as serpentine walkways that created an illusion of larger space than actually existed.

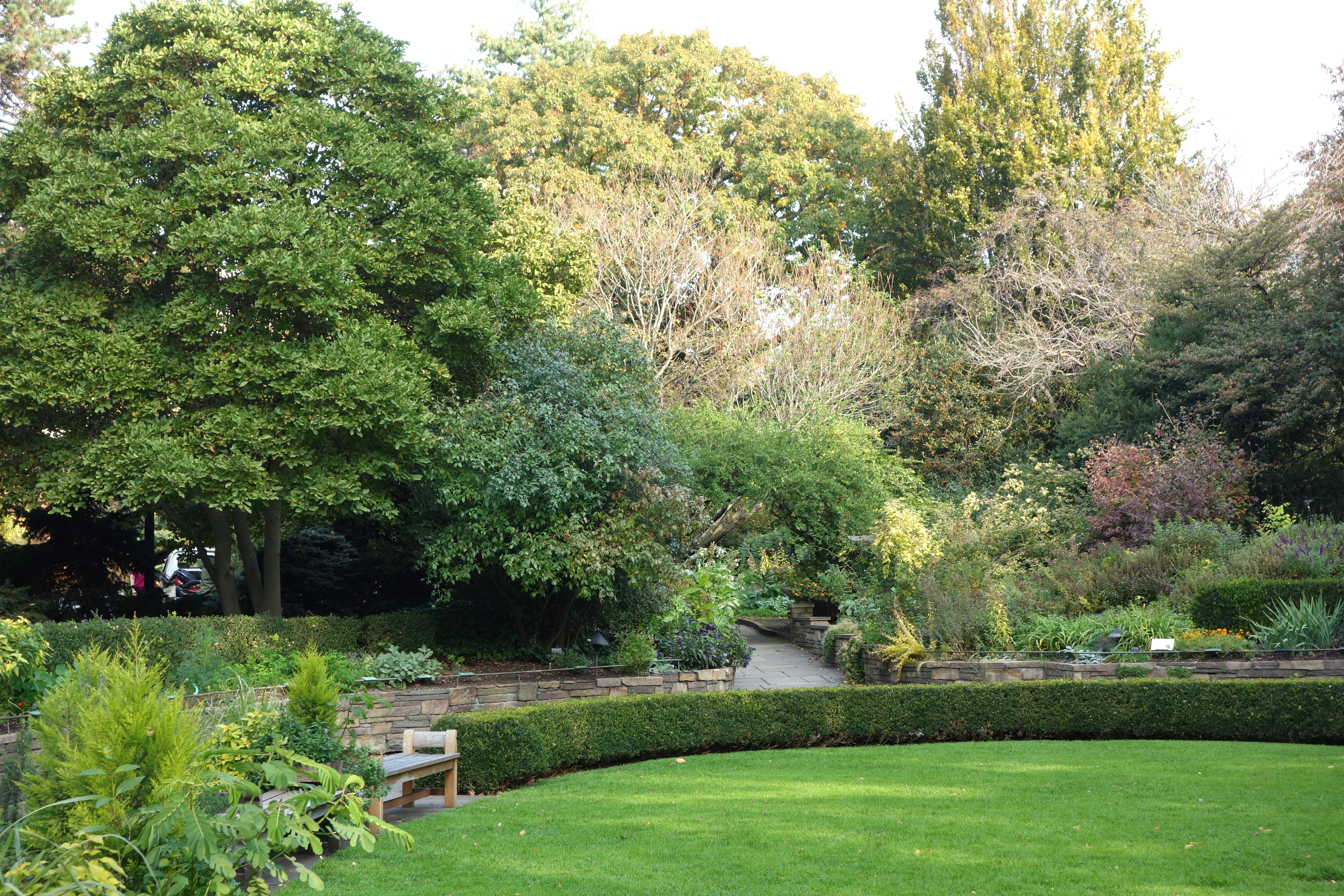
Fragrance Garden - Brooklyn Botanic Garden - Brooklyn, NY - DSC07933

For the Brooklyn Botanic Garden, she designed both the Mae L. Wien Cutting Garden and Helen's Garden of Fragrant Plants (now the Alice Recknagel Ireys Fragrance Garden). The latter was designed specifically for the vision-impaired as a memorial to a blind woman named Helen Goodhart Altschul. It featured wheelchair-accessible paths, raised beds, and Braille signage, and visitors were encouraged to touch the plants. It was widely imitated by designers concerned with making public gardens accessible to people with disabilities. The Fragrance Garden at the Brooklyn Botanic Garden opened in 1955.

From the late 1950s until the early 1980s, Ireys regularly taught at the Landscape Design Schools run by the Federated Garden Clubs. These schools educated garden club members in the principles of "good landscape architectural practice" so that they could "serve as guardians and critics of outdoor beauty in the U.S.A." One major aim of the schools was to further the profession by educating potential board and committee members to advocate for professional planning of public outdoor areas.

In the mid-1960s, following her husband's death, Ireys began writing books, aiming them at amateur gardeners rather than professional landscapers like herself. Her first book, How to Plan and Plant Your Own Property (1967), was written to address the questions and issues raised most often at her lectures. It was an accessible introduction to the principles of landscape design illustrated with photographs of gardens designed by Ireys and some of her colleagues. The book reached a wide audience, from home gardeners to landscape architecture students, and helped lay the groundwork for much more knowledgeable generations of gardeners to follow.

From the late 1950s until the early 1980s Ireys regularly taught at the Landscape Design Schools run by the Federated Garden Clubs. These schools educated garden club members in the principles of "good landscape architectural practice" so that they could "serve as guardians and critics of outdoor beauty in the U.S.A." One major aim of the schools was to further the profession by educating potential board and committee members to advocate for professional planning of public outdoor areas.

In 1987 began working with Burpee, designing specialized gardens which Burpee customers could purchase as a package that included the plans plus all needed seeds and plant materials. The most popular of these designs were published as part of the Burpee American Gardens series in 1991. In the same year Burpee also published Designs for American Gardens. Similar in format to her earlier works, it used a selection of Ireys' built designs to provide ideas and demonstrate principles for small and large gardens.

In 1978, Ireys was elected a fellow of the American Society of Landscape Architects. In 1991, the American Horticultural Society awarded her its highest honor, the Liberty Hyde Bailey Award. In 1992, the Garden Writers' Association of America presented her with its Quill and Trowel Award. In 1994 she received the Brooklyn Botanic Garden's Distinguished Service Medal.

== Death and legacy ==
Ireys worked up to her final illness, dying in Brooklyn in 2000.

A documentary film about Ireys, The Living Landscapes of Alice Recknagel Ireys, was released in 2000.

== Personal life ==
Alice married Henry Tillinghast Ireys III in 1943. They had three children, Catherine, Anne, and Henry, and for a period after their births Alice cut back on her landscaping work. Henry died in 1963.

== Works ==
Books

- Designs for American Gardens (1991) New York: Prentice Hall Gardening. ISBN 9780131836662
- Garden Designs (1991) New York: Prentice Hall. ISBN 9780130933454
- Small Gardens for City and Country: A Guide for Designing and Planting Your Green Spaces (1978) Englewood Cliffs, N.J.: Prentice-Hall. ISBN 9780138130558
- How to Plan and Plant Your Own Property (1967) New York: M. Barrows. ISBN 9780688068318

Gardens

- Clark Botanic Garden
- Alice Recknagel Ireys Fragrance Garden (previously known as Helen's Garden of Fragrant Plants) at the Brooklyn Botanic Garden
- Mae L. Wien Cutting Garden at the Brooklyn Botanic Garden
