= Peter Van de Wetering =

Dutch-American horticulturist

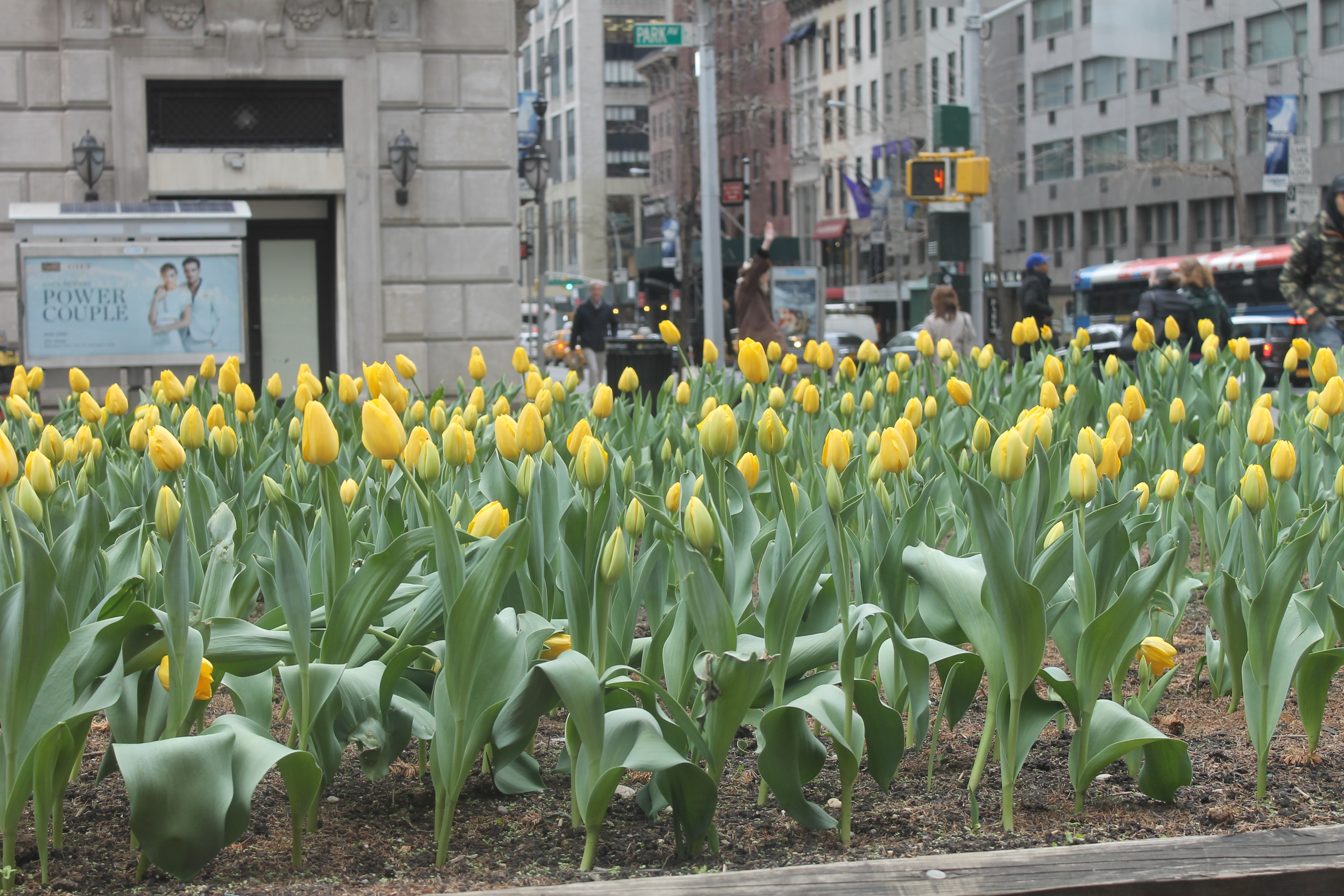
- Tulips along Park Avenue in 2016. Thousands of tulips and other flowers have been planted annually along Park Avenue by Van de Wetering's nursery since 1959.
- Born: July 6, 1931; Naaldwijk, South Holland, Netherlands
- Died: May 28, 2014 (aged 82); Riverhead, New York, United States
- Occupations: Horticulturist, Nurseryman
- Known for: Landscaping Park Avenue, New York
- Spouse: Joyce Van Steekelenburg (m. 1965)
- Children: Marion, Anton, Karen Gravagna

Peter Van de Wetering (July 6, 1931 – May 28, 2014) was a Dutch-born American horticulturist and nurseryman. Van de Wetering won the commission to plant 10,000 daffodils at United Nations Plaza in New York City beginning in 1958. He and his nursery, Van de Wetering Greenhouses, were also responsible to landscape and plant thousands of tulips, begonias, and other plants along Manhattan's Park Avenue since 1959.

== Biography ==
=== Early life ===
He was born in Naaldwijk, South Holland, Netherlands, on July 6, 1931, to Anton Van de Wetering and Catherine (née Van Went). He was raised in The Hague, where his father grew tulips and vegetables in the family greenhouses. He departed the Netherlands for New York City on board the Volander, a Dutch Troopship, in 1951 at the age of 19. Van de Wetering served in the United States Army from 1951 until 1953 after receiving a pardon from Queen Juliana of the Netherlands, which exempted him from serving in the Dutch armed forces.

Van de Wetering was hired by a nursery owner from Long Island after arriving in the U.S. He was then worked for as a deliveryman for a Park Avenue florist in Manhattan during the 1950s. His customers on the Upper East Side included Gloria Vanderbilt. Van de Wetering opened his first nursery on the North Fork of Long Island in the late 1950s. His business started in a small, wooden greenhouse, where he cultivated a small crop of tomatoes to sell at local grocery stores. It would expand immensely over the next few decades, thanks, in part, to a series of major commissions in New York City. The business grew into a complex of greenhouses located in Jamesport, New York, by the 2000s.

=== United Nations Plaza and Park Avenue ===
In 1958, Van de Wetering was commissioned by the United Nations to plant 10,000 daffodils at United Nations Plaza. The commission to provide the UN with flowers marked his first major commission. Still, Van de Wetering recalled a mix of hits and misses during his early years, which he spoke of during a 2013 interview with the New York Times, "There wasn't much knowledge at that time...I remember I was asked to check a planting that was done and I found that the entire bed of hyacinth bulbs were planted upside down."

In 1959, one year as receiving the United Nations' job, Van de Wetering was commissioned by the city of New York to plant tulips and landscape the centers malls on Park Avenue. The commission, which focused on a half-mile section of Park Avenue from 54th Street to 86th Street, became the focus of much of Van de Wetering's professional career for more than 50 years, from 1959 to the 2010s.

Van de Wetering worked as Park Avenue's main gardener, planting his trademark tulips for the city throughout the 1960s. In the 1970s, philanthropist Mary Lasker retained Van de Wetering when she began funding much the landscaping on Park Avenue (New York City was nearly bankrupt at the time). However, while the relationship between Van de Wetering and Lasker was not always smooth, it proved beneficial to all parties, "She was not easy...But if you did things right, she recommended you to the whole world, to all her friends. She wanted value for her money. And she was the one who put me in business."

In 1980, the Fund for Park Avenue, took over responsibility for the maintenance and funding of Park Avenue's landscaping. Van de Wetering and the Fund worked on Park Avenue's flowers and landscaping for more than thirty years. The Fund for Park Avenue made the choice of tulip colors and themes each year based on Van de Wetering's recommendations. Van de Wetering and his gardeners replaced the bulbs each year. His responsibilities for Park Avenue expanded over the years from tulips to include year-round landscaping. He grew more than 30,000 begonias, which replaced the tulips once they have finished flowering, at the Van de Wetering Greenhouses in Jamesport. He and his greenhouse became responsible for each season ranging from tulips and cherry trees in the spring to lit pine trees during the holidays and winter. The business became a family operation. His son, Anton Van de Wetering, became Vice President, while daughters Marion and Karen helped found the business and took prominent roles in the day-to-day operations.

Peter Van de Wetering, a longtime resident of Riverhead, New York, died at his home on May 28, 2014, at the age of 82. He was survived by his wife, Joyce; and their children, Marion, Anton and Karen Gravagna. Van de Wetering married Joyce Van Steekelenburg on January 2, 1965 at a ceremony in Kwintsheul, Netherlands. He had promised her that they would purchase a second home in the Netherlands after she moved to the United States. He was buried in Wading River Cemetery in Wading River, New York.
