= Henry Bell Van Rensselaer =

American politician

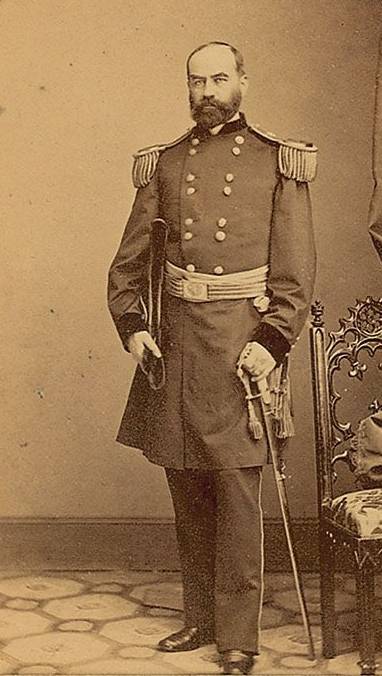

Member of the U.S. House of Representatives from New York's 14th congressional district
- In office March 4, 1841 – March 3, 1843
- Preceded by: John Fine
- Succeeded by: Charles Rogers

Personal details
- Born: May 14, 1810 Albany, New York, US
- Died: March 23, 1864 (aged 53) Cincinnati, Ohio, US
- Resting place: Grace Episcopal Churchyard, Jamaica, Queens, New York City, New York
- Spouse: Elizabeth Ray King (m. 1833)
- Children: 10
- Parent(s): Stephen Van Rensselaer III; Cornelia Paterson
- Relatives: See Van Rensselaer family

Military service
- Allegiance: United States of America; Union
- Branch/service: Union Army
- Years of service: 1831–1832, 1861–1864
- Rank: Colonel (1861-1864); Brigadier General (1861)
- Battles/wars: American Civil War

Henry Bell Van Rensselaer (May 14, 1810 – March 23, 1864) was an American military officer in the Union Army during the American Civil War, and a politician who served in the United States Congress as a representative from the state of New York.

== Early life ==
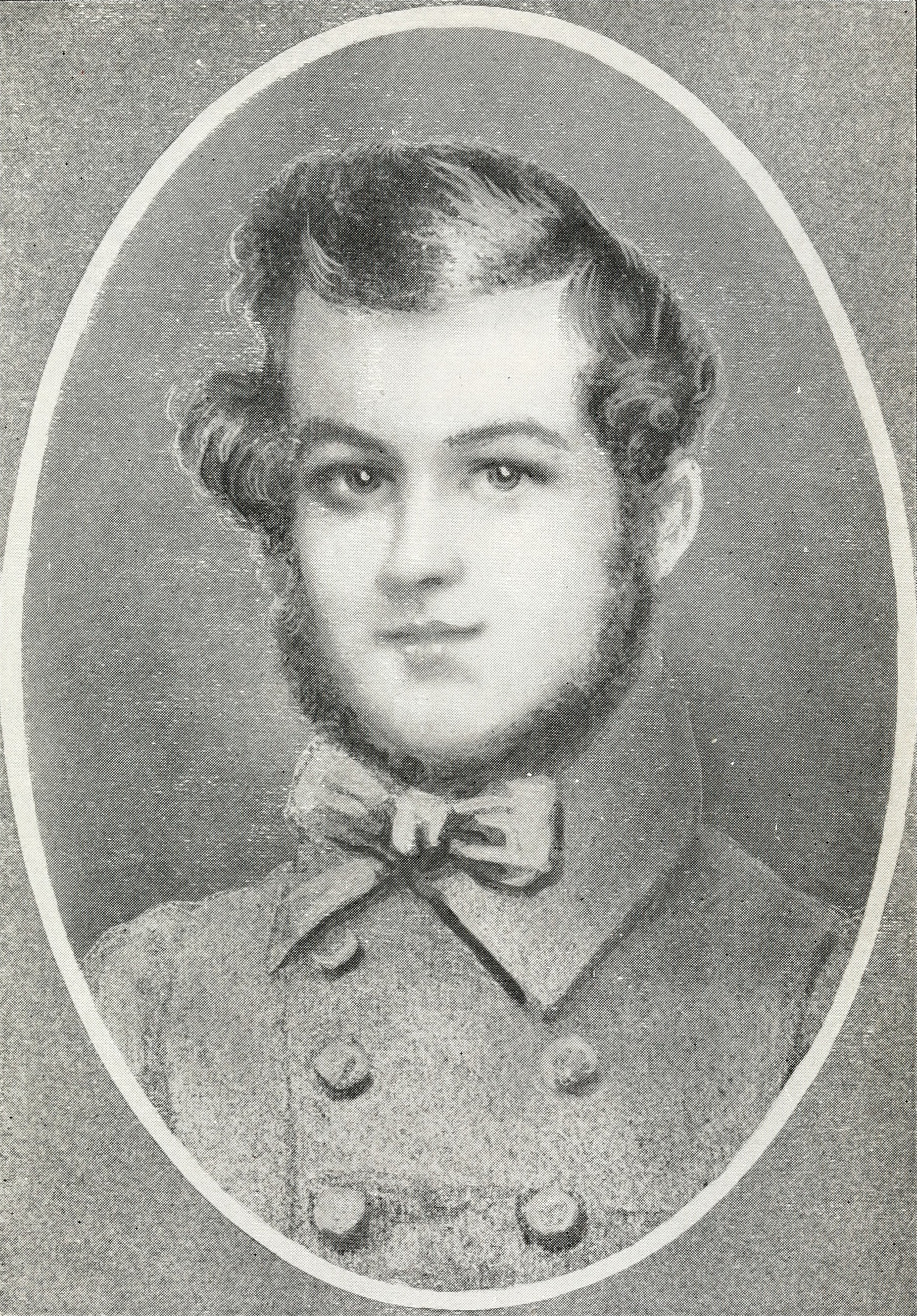
Van Rensselaer as a young man

Henry Van Rensselaer was born at the manor house in Albany, New York. His father was Stephen Van Rensselaer III, the patroon of the Manor of Rensselaerswyck, who was also a United States Representative and founder of the Rensselaer Polytechnic Institute. The Van Rensselaers belong to the King family of Massachusetts and New York City. His mother, Cornelia Paterson, was the daughter of William Paterson, who served as Governor of New Jersey and an Associate Justice of the United States Supreme Court. He graduated from the United States Military Academy at West Point, New York, in 1831.

== Career ==
He was appointed a brevet Second Lieutenant of the Fifth Regiment, United States Infantry on July 1, 1831, and resigned January 27, 1832. He then engaged in agricultural pursuits near Ogdensburg, New York, and served as a military aide to Governor William H. Seward from 1839 to 1840.

Upon his father's death in 1839, Van Rensselaer, as the fifth son, inherited the wild lands in St. Lawrence County along the St. Lawrence River. His eldest brother, Stephen Van Rensselaer IV inherited the manor on the Albany side of the Hudson River.

Van Rensselaer was elected as a Whig to the Twenty-seventh United States Congress, and served from March 4, 1841, to March 3, 1843. He was subsequently president of several mining companies, including the American Mineral Company and the Consolidated Franklinite Company. He was a director of the Northern Railroad (later the Rutland Railroad), but resigned to help found the Ogdensburg, Clayton and Rome Railroad.

=== U.S. Civil War ===
Upon the outbreak of the American Civil War, he reentered the military service with the rank of colonel in the Union Army, and was appointed chief of staff to General Winfield Scott as a brigadier general. After Scott's retirement, Van Rensselaer was reappointed as a colonel, and from November 1861 until his death, he served as an inspector general of several corps and departments including the 1st Army Corps, Department of the Rappahannock, 3rd Army Corps and Department of the Ohio.

== Personal life ==
On August 22, 1833, Van Rensselaer married Elizabeth Ray King (1815–1900), daughter of John Alsop King (1788–1867), the Governor of New York, and Mary Ray. Elizabeth's maternal grandfather was U.S. Senator Rufus King (1755–1827) and her great-grandfather was John Alsop (1724–1792), a prominent New York City merchant. Together, they had:

- Mary Van Rensselaer (1834–1902), who married John Henry Screven (1823–1903) in 1874.
- Cornelia Van Rensselaer (1836–1864), who married James Lenox Kennedy (1823–1864), son of David Sproat Kennedy and nephew of philanthropist James Lenox.
- Stephen Van Rensselaer (1838–1904), who married Mathilda Coster Heckscher (1838–1915).
- Henry Van Rensselaer, who died young.
- Euphemia Van Rensselaer (1842–), who became a Sister of Charity and took the name Marie Dolores.
- Elizabeth Van Rensselaer (1845–1911), who married George Waddington (1840–1915), a son of William D. Waddington (1811–1886) and Mary Elizabeth Ogden (1810–1867).
- John King Van Rensselaer (1847–1909), who married May Denning King (1848–1925), granddaughter of James Gore King.
- Katherine Van Rensselaer (1849–1901), who married Dr. Francis Delafield (1841–1915), son of Dr. Edward Delafield, in 1870.
- Henry Van Rensselaer (1851–1907), who joined the Society of Jesus.
- Westerlo Van Rensselaer (1853–1857), who died young.

Van Rensselaer died of typhoid fever in Cincinnati, Ohio, shortly before the end of the War. He was interred in the Grace Episcopal Churchyard, in Jamaica, Queens in New York City.

=== Descendants ===
Through his son, John King Van Rensselaer, he was the grandfather of John Alexander Van Rensselaer (b. 1872), who married Helen F. Galindo in 1896, and who was arrested in 1908 for attempting to extort $5,000 from his mother.

Through his granddaughter, Julia Floyd Delafield, Henry was the great-grandfather of Floyd Crosby (1899–1985), himself the father of musician David Crosby (1941-2023).

Through his daughter, Elizabeth Van Rensselaer Waddington, Henry was the great grandfather of actress Jane Wyatt (1910-2006).

U.S. House of Representatives
Preceded by John Fine	Member of the U.S. House of Representatives from New York's 14th congressional district 1841–1843	Succeeded by Charles Rogers
