= Archibald Gracie =

American businessman and merchant (1755–1829)

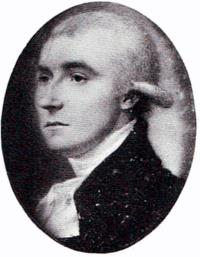
- Born: June 25, 1755; Dumfries, Scotland
- Died: April 11, 1829 (aged 73); New York City, U.S.
- Resting place: Woodlawn Cemetery
- Occupation: Merchant
- Spouses: Esther Rogers (after 1784): Elizabeth Fitch
- Children: 4
- Relatives: Archibald Gracie III (grandson); Charles King (son-in-law); James Gore King (son-in-law); William Lawrence (son-in-law)

Archibald Gracie (June 25, 1755 – April 11, 1829) was a Scottish-born shipping magnate and early American businessman and merchant in New York City and Virginia whose spacious home, Gracie Mansion, later became the residence of the Mayor of New York City.

== Early life ==
Archibald Gracie was born June 25, 1755, in Dumfries, Scotland. He was the son of a weaver named William Gracie. In 1776, Gracie moved to Liverpool and clerked for a London shipping firm. He used his earnings to purchase a part interest in a merchant ship.

== Career ==
In April 1784, he sailed to America with a cargo of goods that were his own profit stock. He used the proceeds to invest in a mercantile company in New York City. He later moved to Petersburg, Virginia, and engaged in the export of tobacco to Great Britain. In 1793, he moved back to New York and became a commissary merchant and shipowner (Archibald Gracie and Sons, East India Merchants). Gracie was a business partner of Alexander Hamilton and a friend of John Jay.

Gracie was a member of the Tontine Association, which supervised the trading of stocks. Gracie expanded his interests and became active in the banking and insurance industries. He was a director of New York's earliest savings bank, the New York Bank for Savings. He was an incorporator of the Eagle Fire Insurance Company and vice president of the New York Insurance Company, a director of the United States Bank and of the Bank of America.

He served as Vice-President of the New York Chamber of Commerce from 1800 to 1825, and the 18th president of the St. Andrew's Society of New York, serving from 1818 to 1823.

=== Gracie Mansion ===
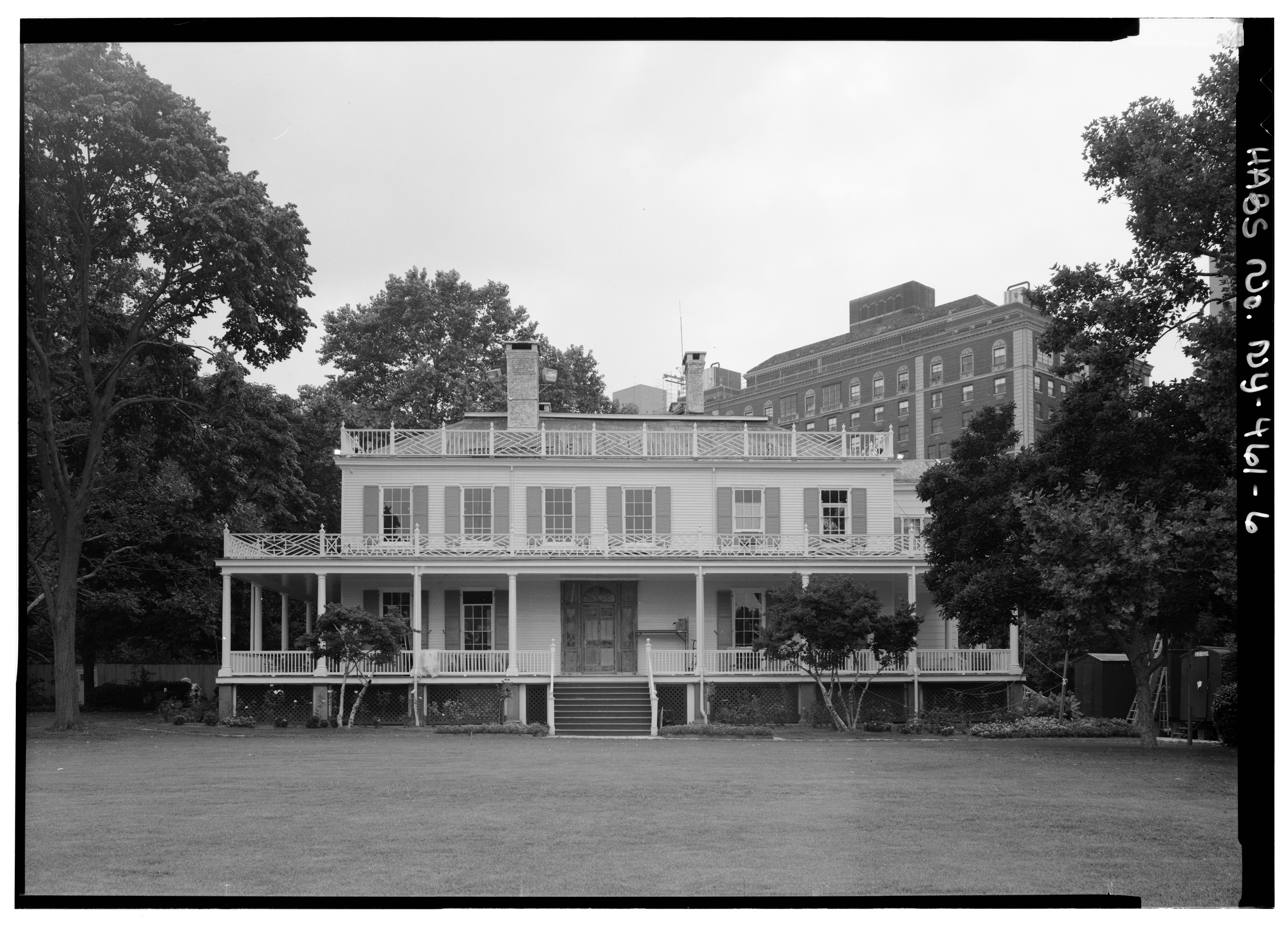
Gracie Mansion

In 1798, Gracie purchased a large tract of land on Horn's Hook near the East River, where the following year he constructed a large two-story wooden mansion on the crest of a hill. Used primarily as his country home, the mansion quickly became a hub of the New York city social scene. Gracie's distinguished guests at the mansion included Hamilton, who founded the New-York Evening Post, future United States president John Quincy Adams, and future French king Louis Phillippe.

In 1823, Gracie sold the estate to pay off debts. It was acquired by New York City in 1891 and later became the residence of the mayor of the city.

== Personal life ==
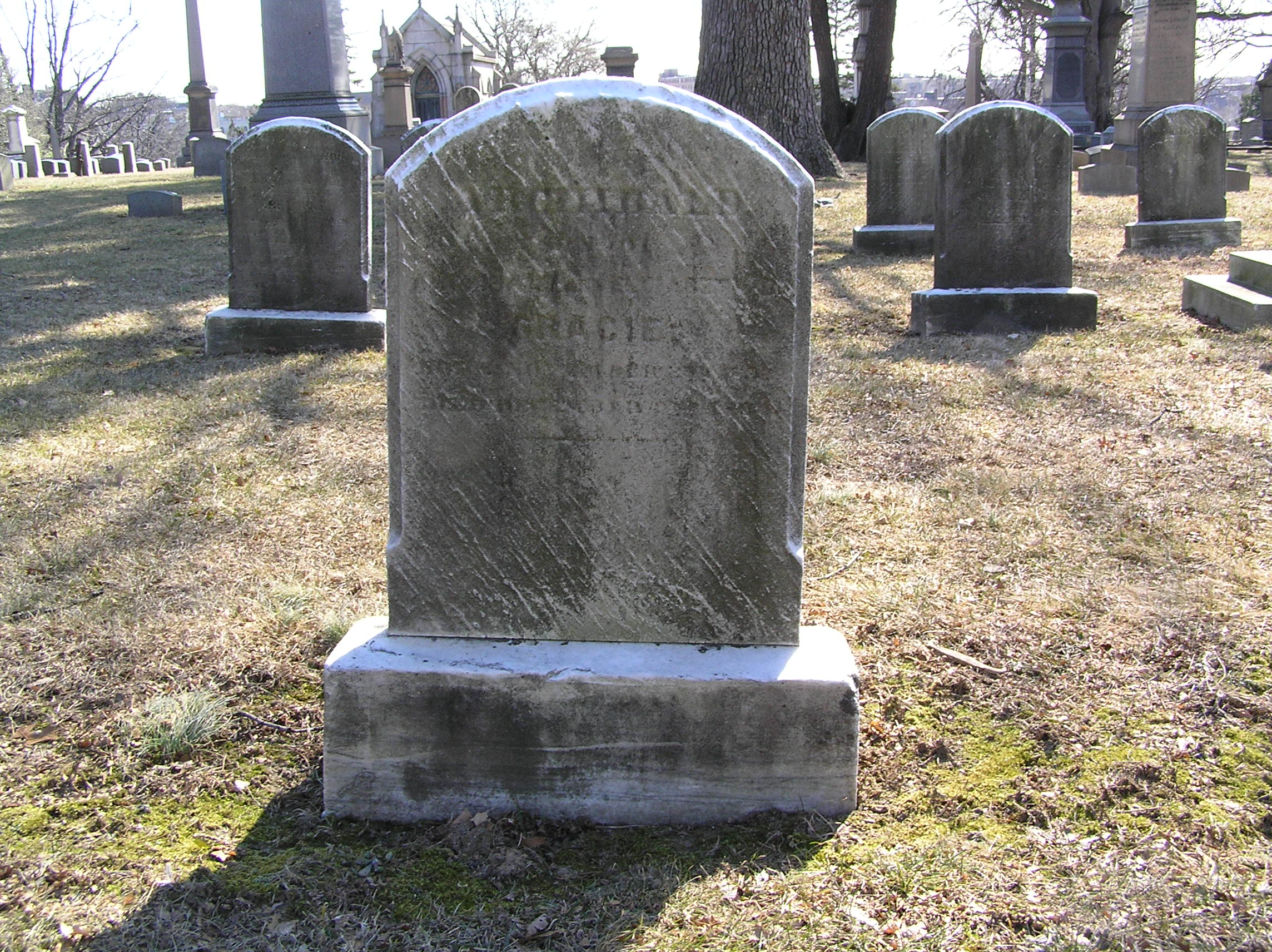
The grave of Archibald Gracie in Woodlawn Cemetery

In 1784, he married Esther "Hetitia" Rogers (1757–1833), a daughter of Nehemiah Rogers (1718–1760) and Elizabeth Fitch (1723–1812). Rogers was the granddaughter of Samuel Fitch (1701–1787), a member of the House of Representatives of the Colony of Connecticut who was the brother of Thomas Fitch (1699–1774), former governor of the Connecticut Colony. Together, they had several children, including:

- Eliza Gracie (1790–1825), who married Charles King (1789–1867), the president of Columbia University, and the second son of U.S. Senator Rufus King
- Sarah Gracie (1791–1878), who married James Gore King (1791–1853), a U.S. congressman, and the third son of Rufus King
- Archibald Gracie II (1795–1865), who married Elizabeth Davidson Bethune (d. 1863)
- Esther Rogers Gracie (1801–1857), who married William Beach Lawrence (1800–1881), Lieutenant Governor of Rhode Island
- Mary Ann Gracie (1805–1876), who married Judge Michael Ulshoeffer (1793–1881).

After the death of his wife, Gracie married Elizabeth Fitch. His marriage yielded ten children.

=== Descendants ===
Gracie's grandson, Archibald Gracie III (1832–1864), a general in the Confederate Army, was killed at the Siege of Petersburg during the American Civil War. Another grandson, and Archibald Gracie III's younger brother, James King Gracie (1840–1903), was married to Anna Louisa Bulloch (1833–1893), daughter of James Stephens Bulloch (1793–1849) and the sister of Martha Bulloch (1835–1884), who married Theodore Roosevelt, Sr. (1831–1878).

His granddaughter, Emily Sophia King (1823–1853), married Stephen Van Rensselaer Paterson (1817–1872), grandson of William Paterson (1745–1806), a U.S. Senator, Governor of New Jersey and Justice of the Supreme Court of the United States.

Gracie's great-grandson, Archibald Gracie IV (1858–1912), was a military officer and writer who survived the sinking of the RMS Titanic in 1912. Coincidentally, one of Gracie IV's fellow travellers on the Titanic was John Jacob Astor IV, great-grandson of frequent Gracie Mansion visitor, and personal friend of Gracie I, John Jacob Astor.
