= Nathaniel Thayer (disambiguation) =

Nathaniel Thayer (1769–1840) was an American minister.

Nathaniel Thayer can mean also:

- Nathaniel Thayer Jr. (1808–1883), son of previous, American financier and philanthropist
- Nathaniel Thayer III (1851–1911), son of previous, American banker and railroad executive
- Nate Thayer (1960–2023), American journalist
