= John Thayer (ornithologist) =

American amateur ornithologist

John Eliot Thayer
- Born: John Eliot Thayer; April 3, 1862; Boston, Massachusetts
- Died: July 29, 1933 (aged 71); Lancaster, Massachusetts
- Education: Harvard University
- Spouse: Evelyn Duncan Forbes (m. 1886)
- Parent(s): Cornelia Paterson Van Rensselaer; Nathaniel Thayer Jr.
- Relatives: Bayard Thayer (brother); Nathaniel Thayer III (brother); Stephen Van Rensselaer IV (grandfather)

John Eliot Thayer (April 3, 1862 – July 29, 1933) was an American amateur ornithologist, businessman, and politician. He created one of the largest collections of bird specimens which he donated to Harvard University.

== Early life ==
Thayer was born in Boston, Massachusetts, on April 3, 1862. He was a son of Cornelia Paterson (née Van Rensselaer) Thayer (1823–1897) and Nathaniel Thayer Jr., a banker who built Harvard's Thayer Hall. Among his siblings were twin brother Bayard Thayer (yachtsman and horticulturalist), older brother Nathaniel Thayer III (a banker and railroad executive), and sister Cornelia Van Rensselaer Thayer (the wife of New York State Senator J. Hampden Robb).

His maternal grandparents were Stephen Van Rensselaer IV (the 10th Patroon and 7th Lord of the Manor of Rensselaerswyck) and Harriet Elizabeth (née Bayard) Van Rensselaer. His paternal grandparents were Sarah Parker (née Toppan) Thayer and the Rev. Dr. Nathaniel Thayer, a Unitarian congregational minister from Lancaster, Massachusetts. Through his father, he was descended from John Cotton, the preeminent minister and theologian of the Massachusetts Bay Colony.

Thayer graduate from Harvard University in 1885. He received an honora A.M. degree from Harvard in 1910.

== Career ==
Thayer was a trustee of the Clinton Savings Bank. He was a selectman of Lancaster for many years. He was on the staff of Governor William E. Russell for three years. Thayer was interested in horses and was elected vice president of the Grand Circuit in New York in 1904.

He became interested in ornithology in the mid-1890s, building up a collection which he housed in a museum in the main street of Lancaster. He used his wealth to sponsor various natural history expeditions and in 1906 he sent Wilmot W. Brown Jr. to Guadalupe Island off Pacific Mexico. Here, Brown, H. W. Marsden and Ignacio Oroso gathered field data on how the natural vegetation was being destroyed by thousands of goats, to the detriment of the native wildlife. The native Guadalupe storm petrel was being predated by introduced cats, as was the Guadalupe flicker. Both birds became extinct shortly afterwards; several other taxa were found to be already gone in 1906. Thayer and Outram Bangs wrote an article in The Condor to draw attention to the situation.

In 1913, Thayer and other Harvard graduates sponsored an expedition to Alaska and Siberia, with Joseph S. Dixon and Winthrop Sprague Brooks as zoological collectors. A gull collected by Brooks on this trip was named Larus thayeri in Thayer's honour.

Thayer was a member of the faculty of the Museum of Comparative Zoology at the University of Cambridge. He was a fellow of the American Academy of Arts and Sciences.

Thayer became ill in 1928, and donated his collection of 28,000 skins and 15,000 eggs and nests to Harvard. These included the first clutches ever collected of spoon-billed sandpiper and surfbird. After Thayer's death Harvard received his collection of 3,500 mounted birds.

== Personal life ==
On June 22, 1886, Thayer was married to Evelyn Duncan Forbes (1862–1943), a daughter of Franklin Forbes and Martha Ann Stearns (née Cushing) Forbes, in Clinton, Massachusetts. After the marriage, they settled at the family farm at Lancaster, thirty-five miles west of Boston. Together, John and Evelyn were the parents of:

- John Eliot Thayer Jr. (1887–1966), a delegate to 1928 Republican National Convention from Massachusetts who married Katherine Lee Bayard Warren, a daughter of Samuel Dennis Warren.
- Evelyn Thayer (1888–1980), who married Isaac Tucker Burr (1885–1972)
- Nora Forbes Thayer (1889–1988), who married Francis Abbot Goodhue Jr.
- Natalie Thayer (1894–1975), who married Lawrence Hemenway (1891–1966).
- Duncan Forbes Thayer (1900–1957), who married Priscilla Pinkney McHenry (1906–1975). After his death, she married Charles Winslow Farnsworth in 1963.

Thayer was a member of the Algonquin Club, the Havard Club of New York City, the Myopia Country Club, and the Somerset Club. He served on the national board of the Unitarian Church.

Thayer died on July 29, 1933, in Lancaster and was buried at Old Settlers Burial Yard there.
