= Nathaniel Thayer III =

American banker and railroad executive

Nathaniel Thayer
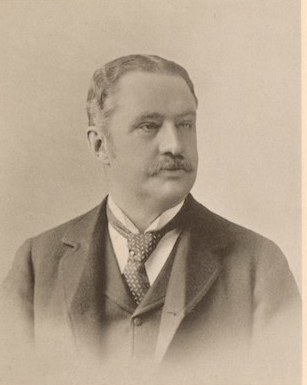
- Born: June 16, 1851; Boston, Massachusetts, U.S.
- Died: March 21, 1911 (aged 59); Boston, Massachusetts, U.S.
- Education: Harvard University
- Spouses: Cornelia Street Barroll (m. 1881; died 1885) Pauline Revere (m. 1887)
- Children: 3
- Parent(s): Nathaniel Thayer Jr. Cornelia Patterson Van Rensselaer
- Relatives: John Thayer (brother); Nathaniel Thayer (grandfather); Stephen Van Rensselaer (grandfather); Katherine Winthrop (granddaughter)

Nathaniel Thayer (June 13, 1851 – March 21, 1911) was an American banker and railroad executive.

== Early life ==
Thayer was born on June 13, 1851, in Boston, Massachusetts. He was the son of Nathaniel Thayer Jr. (1808–1883) and Cornelia Paterson (née Van Rensselaer) Thayer (1823–1897). Among his siblings was Stephen Van Rensselaer Thayer; Cornelia Van Rensselaer Thayer, who married J. Hampden Robb in 1868; Harriet Van Rensselaer Thayer; Eugene Van Rensselaer Thayer; Bayard Thayer; and John Eliot Thayer, a noted ornithologist. His father, a banker in the Boston firm of John E. Thayer and Brother, was fellow of Harvard and one of its largest benefactors.

Through his mother, he was a descendant of the Van Rensselaer and Schuyler families. His maternal grandparents were Stephen Van Rensselaer IV and Harriet Elizabeth (née Bayard Van Rensselaer). Through is father, he was descended from John Cotton, the preeminent minister and theologian of the Massachusetts Bay Colony. His paternal grandparents were the Rev. Dr. Nathaniel Thayer, a Unitarian congregational minister of Lancaster, Massachusetts, and his wife, Sarah Parker (née Toppan) Thayer.

Thayer graduated from Harvard University in 1871, where five years earlier his father had given Thayer Hall to.

== Career ==
After graduating from Harvard, he traveled abroad for two years. Upon his return in 1874, he went into the banking business with his father from whom he inherited $2,000,000, who left an estate valued in excess of $16,000,000 to $17,000,000 upon his death in 1883.

In 1876, Thayer became the president of the Boston, Clinton and Fitchburg Railroad Company and the Union Stock Yards Company of Chicago. He served as vice president of the North Chicago Rolling Mill Company He was also a member of the Corporation of the Massachusetts Institute of Technology. In 1877, and again in 1879, he was a Democratic candidate for the Massachusetts state legislature.

He also served as a director of the New York, New Haven and Hartford Railroad, the American Bell Telephone Company, the American Telephone and Telegraph company, Massachusetts Life Insurance Company, Old Colony Trust Company, United States Steel, Merchants' National Bank, New England Trust Company. He was a trustee of the Massachusetts General Hospital Corporation.

== Personal life ==
On February 1, 1881, Thayer was married to Cornelia Street Barroll (1856–1885), the daughter of Benjamin Crockett Barroll, a well known lawyer and author of the law book, Barroll's Chancery Practice. In 1910, the Thayers lived in Lancaster, Massachusetts, and had a home in Newport, Rhode Island. Together, Nathaniel and Cornelia were the parents of:

- Cornelia Van Rensselaer Thayer (1881–1960), who married Danish Count Carl Moltke (1869–1935), the Danish Ambassador to the United States, in 1907.
- Anna Morton Thayer (1883–1953), who married William Samuel Patten (1873–1927) in June 1904. After his death, she married Rev. Thomas Frederick Davies (1872–1936) in 1930.
- Sarah Barroll Thayer (1885–1938), who was known as "the prettiest girl in Boston," was married Frederic Bayard Winthrop (1868–1932), the son of banker Robert Winthrop in 1911.

After his first wife's death in 1885, he remarried to Pauline Revere (1862–1934), the daughter of Paul Joseph Revere (a Brig. Gen. who died during the Battle of Gettysburg and was the grandson and namesake of Revolutionary War patriot Paul Revere), on June 11, 1887. Pauline was a member of the Republican National Committee in 1924, "and was looked upon as advisor and confidante of both Presidents Coolidge and Hoover." In Boston, Thayer was a member of the Somerset Club, the Country Club, the Tennis and Racquet Club, the New Riding Club, the Eastern Yacht Club, the Algonquin Club, the Exchange Club, the St. Botolph Club, and in New York City, he was a member of the Knickerbocker Club, the Union Club of the City of New York, the Midday Club, the Turf and Field Club and the New York Yacht Club.

In 1897 Nathaniel Thayer III inherited a mansion from his mother Cornelia Van Rensselaer Thayer. In 1902, with his expanding fortune, he decided to increase the size of the home on Main street in Lancaster, MA to a 42 room home. He hired architect Ogden Codman Jr. to design, enlarge and remodel the mansion. Codman had made quite a name for himself in Newport and New York as a “top-notch interior designer”. He added two new wings to The Homestead which “has virtually been unchanged since 1902”

Thayer died at his home, 22 Fairfield Street in Boston (in the Back Bay neighborhood), on March 21, 1911, after suffering from a "general nervous breakdown." His widow died in 1934.

=== Descendants ===
Through his eldest daughter, he was the maternal grandfather of Count Carl Adam Moltke (1908–1989), a member of the Danish underground in World War II, who married Mabel Wilson Wright (née Comstock) in 1944 (1909–1988). They divorced in 1956 and later that same year, he married Doris Eccles (1914-1965), the daughter of Edward Eccles (1882–1975) of Newport, Rhode Island.

Through his youngest daughter, he was the maternal grandfather of three, Nathaniel Thayer Winthrop; John Winthrop, who died young; and Katherine Winthrop (1914–1997), the tennis star, who married Quincy Adams Shawn McKean (1891–1971), the parents of David McKean, the U.S. Ambassador to Luxembourg during Barack Obama's presidency.
