= Thayer family =

Boston Brahmin family

Thayer
- Origin: England

The Thayer family is an American Boston Brahmin family. They are descended from early settlers and brothers Thomas Thayer (1596–1665) and Richard Thayer (1601–1664).

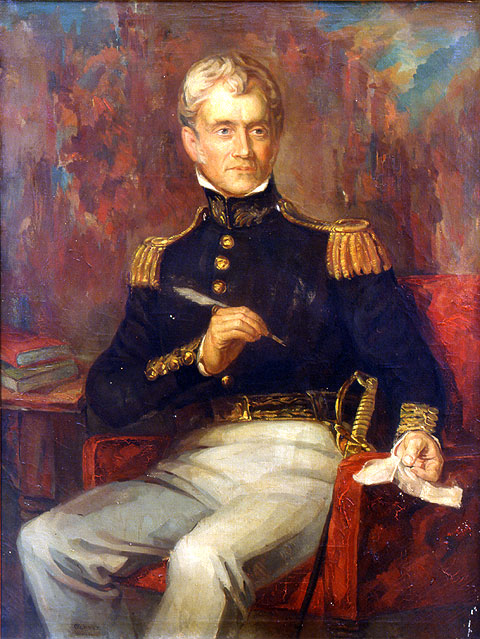
Sylvanus Thayer, the Father of West Point

== Notable members ==
- Atherton Thayer (1766–1798), Sheriff
- Ebenezer Thayer (1746–1809), Sheriff
- Thomas Thayer (1596–1665), Pilgrim
- Richard Thayer (1601–1664), Pilgrim
- Simeon Thayer (1737–1800), American Revolutionary War officer
- Sylvanus Thayer (1785–1872), United States Army general, Father of West Point
- Nathaniel Thayer, Jr. (1808–1883), financier, philanthropist, and one of the most generous citizens of Boston
  - Nathaniel Thayer, III (1851–1911), capitalist and pioneer railroad promoter
  - Bayard Thayer (1862–1916), millionaire sportsman, horticulturist
  - John Eliot Thayer (April 3, 1862 – July 29, 1933) ornithologist
- Eugene Van Rensselaer Thayer (1855–1907), financier and capitalist
  - Eugene Van Rensselaer Thayer, Jr. (1881–1937), banker and businessman
- Adin Thayer (1816–1890), New York politician
- Alexander Wheelock Thayer (1817–1897), American librarian, journalist, and biographer
- Andrew J. Thayer (1818–1873), United States Representative from Oregon
- William Wallace Thayer (1827–1899), Governor of Oregon and brother of Andrew J. Thayer
- James Bradley Thayer (1831–1902), American legal writer and educationist
- Amos Madden Thayer (1841–1905), United States federal judge
- Francis S. Thayer (1822–1880), New York politician
- William Roscoe Thayer (1859–1923), American historian
- Harry Irving Thayer (1869–1926), United States Representative from Massachusetts

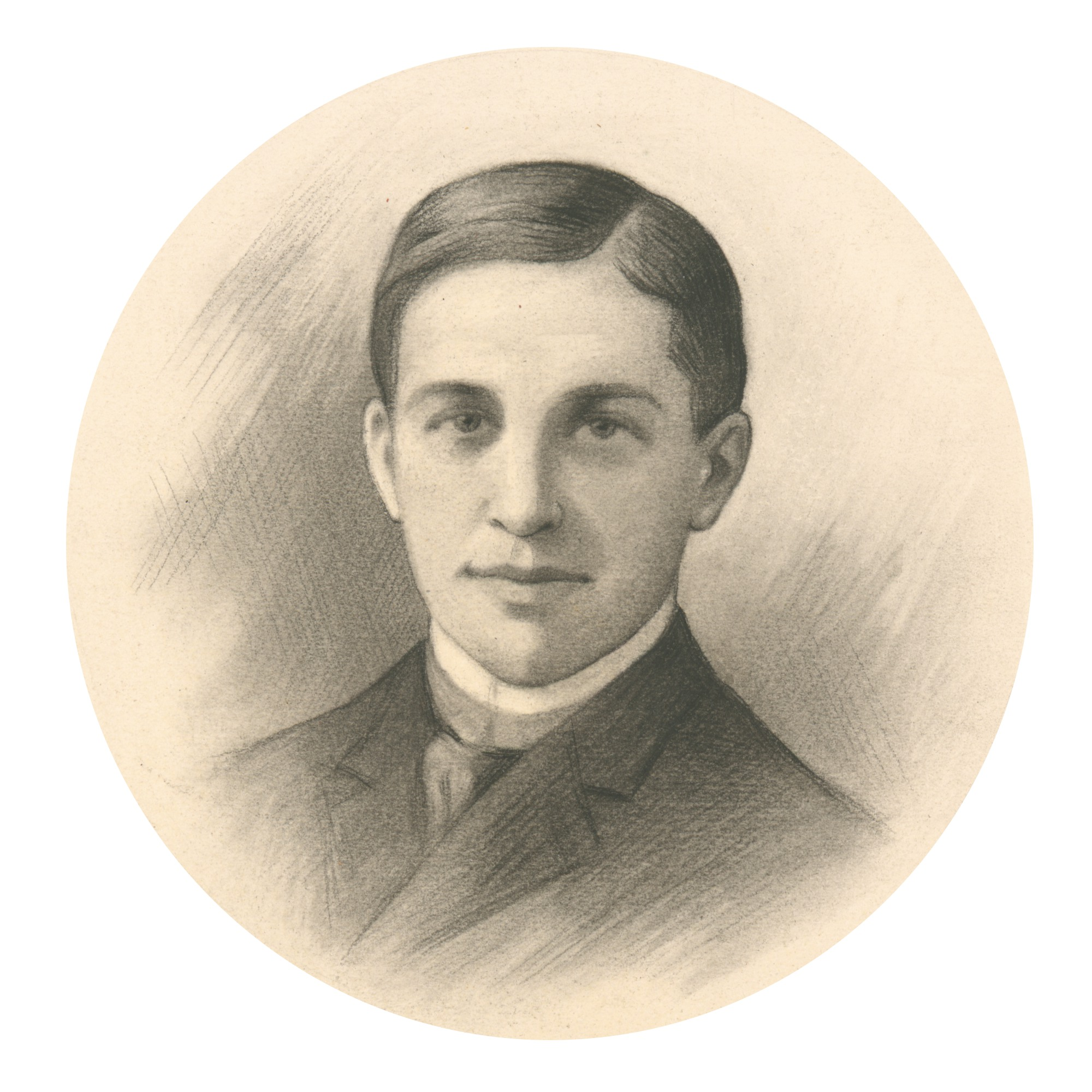
Ernest Thayer, American poet

- Ernest Thayer (1863–1940), American poet, author of "Casey at the Bat", and uncle of Scofield Thayer
- Scofield Thayer (1889–1982), American poet and publisher
- Eli Thayer (1819–1899), United States Representative from Massachusetts
  - John A. Thayer (1857–1917), United States Representative from Massachusetts
- John Milton Thayer (1820–1906), Governor of Nebraska, Governor of Wyoming, United States Senator, and Civil War general
- Samuel R. Thayer (1837–1909), United States Ambassador to the Netherlands
- John R. Thayer (1845–1916), United States Representative from Massachusetts
- Abbott Handerson Thayer (1849–1921), American painter, amateur naturalist, and teacher
- Webster Thayer (1857–1933), the judge at the trial of Sacco and Vanzetti
- William Greenough Thayer (1863–1934), American educator
- Sigourney Thayer (1896–1944), poet, theatrical producer, and aviator
- Robert H. Thayer (1901–1984), American lawyer, naval officer, and diplomat
- Edwin Pope Thayer (1864–1943), Secretary of the United States Senate from 1925 to 1933
- Martin Russell Thayer (1819–1906), United States Representative, great uncle of John Borland Thayer
- John Borland Thayer (1862–1912), American businessman who died on the RMS Titanic
  - Jack Thayer (1894–1945), his son, survivor of the Titanic sinking
- James B. Thayer (1922–2018), United States Brigadier General
  - Tommy Thayer (born 1960), lead guitarist for the rock band Kiss
- Tom Thayer (born 1961), retired American football player for the Chicago Bears and Miami Dolphins
