= Senator Thayer =

Senator may refer to:

- Damon Thayer (born 1967), Kentucky State Senate
- Ebeneezer Thayer (1746–1809), Massachusetts State Senate
- Francis S. Thayer (1822–1880), New York State Senate
- John Milton Thayer (1820–1906), U.S. Senator from Nebraska
- John R. Thayer (1845–1916), Massachusetts State Senate
- Lyman Wellington Thayer (1854–1919), Wisconsin State Senate
- Warren T. Thayer (1869–1956), New York State Senate
