= Bayard Thayer =

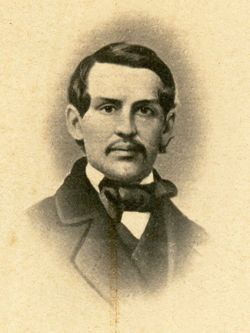
- Born: April 3, 1862; Boston, MA
- Died: November 29, 1916 (aged 54); Lancaster, MA
- Spouse: Ruth (Simpkins) Thayer (1864-1941)
- Parent(s): Nathaniel Thayer II & Corneli Patterson (Van Rensselaer) Thayer
- Family: John Eliot Thayer(twin)

Bayard Thayer (1862-1916) was a yachtsman and horticulturist, and member of the Thayer Family of Lancaster, Massachusetts.

== Early life ==
Born in Boston, Massachusetts on April 3, 1862, he was the grandson of Thayer, and also was the grandson of Rev. Dr. Nathaniel Thayer, Unitarian minister of the First Church of Christ in Lancaster and son of Nathaniel Thayer, a banker. He was named after his maternal grandmother Harriet Elizabeth (Bayard) Van Rensselaer. His twin brother was John Eliot Thayer the ornithologist.

== Boston townhouses ==
Bayard city homes were a part of the Thayer Family land. He lived at both 305 Commonwealth Ave, designed by Peabody & Stearns, and later at 32 Hereford, designed by McKim, Mead, & White, with his wife Ruth Thayer.

== Thayer estate ==
Thayer Estate, Lancaster, MA

Thayer Estate Stables

He built the Thayer estate in Lancaster, Massachusetts, in 1901 and designed by architect Guy Lowell and landscape by Herbert W.C. Browne.

It was built as a summer home to Thayer who was a horticulturalist, the mansion then passed through the hands of the Greek Orthodox and Catholic churches, was briefly a school for the blind, and ultimately became the famed Maharishi Ayurveda Health Center used by celebrities such as Elizabeth Taylor.It still stands today in Lancaster, and is presently unoccupied and up for sale.

Interior Photos

== Yachting ==
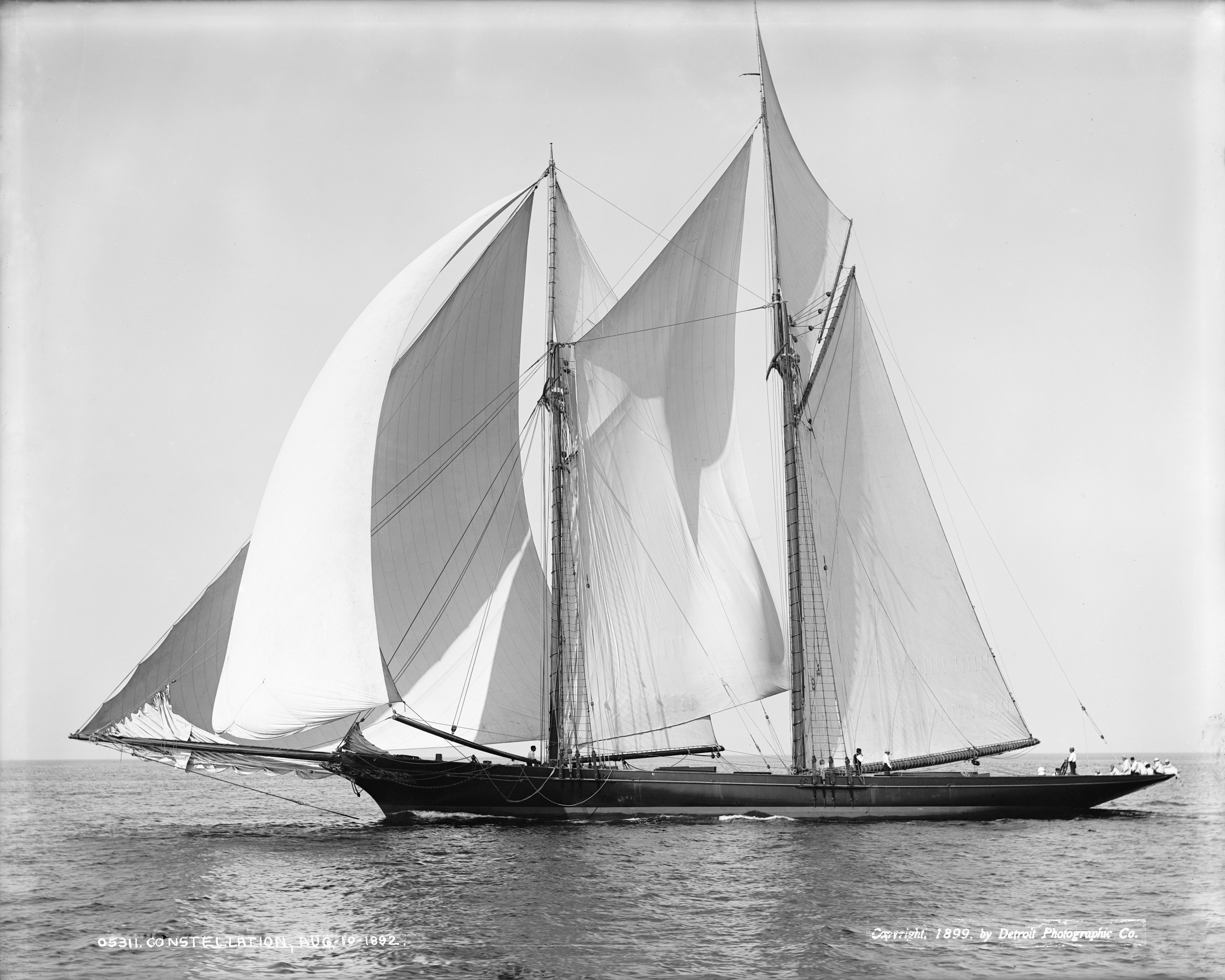
Constellation

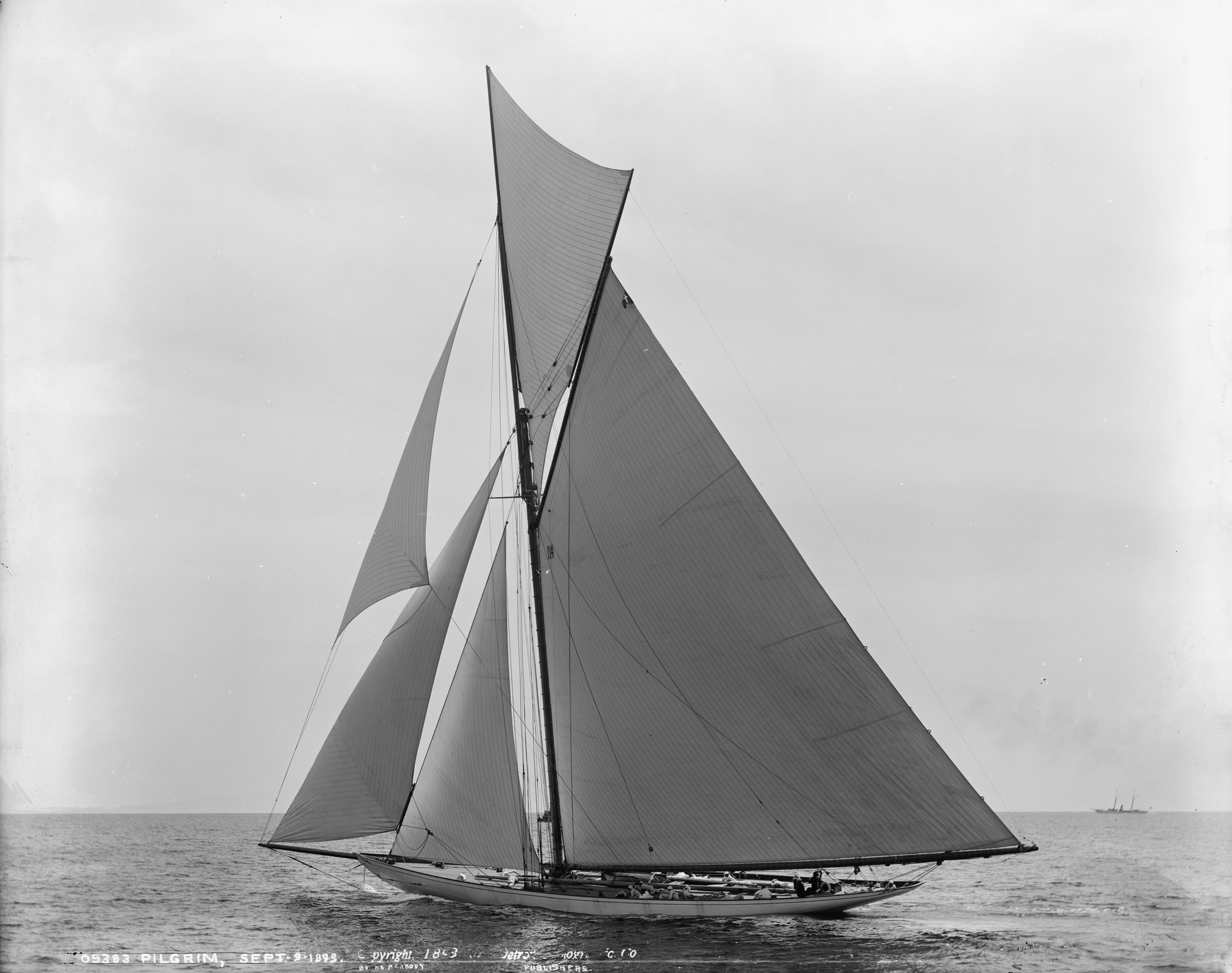
Pilgrim

Bayard Thayer was also a yachtsman. He would compete in many races after purchasing E.D. Morgan's steel hull schooner Constellation in 1892, and having the George Stewart designed the yacht Pilgrim built for him.
