= Benjamin Thayer House =

Historic house in Massachusetts, United States

- U.S. National Register of Historic Places
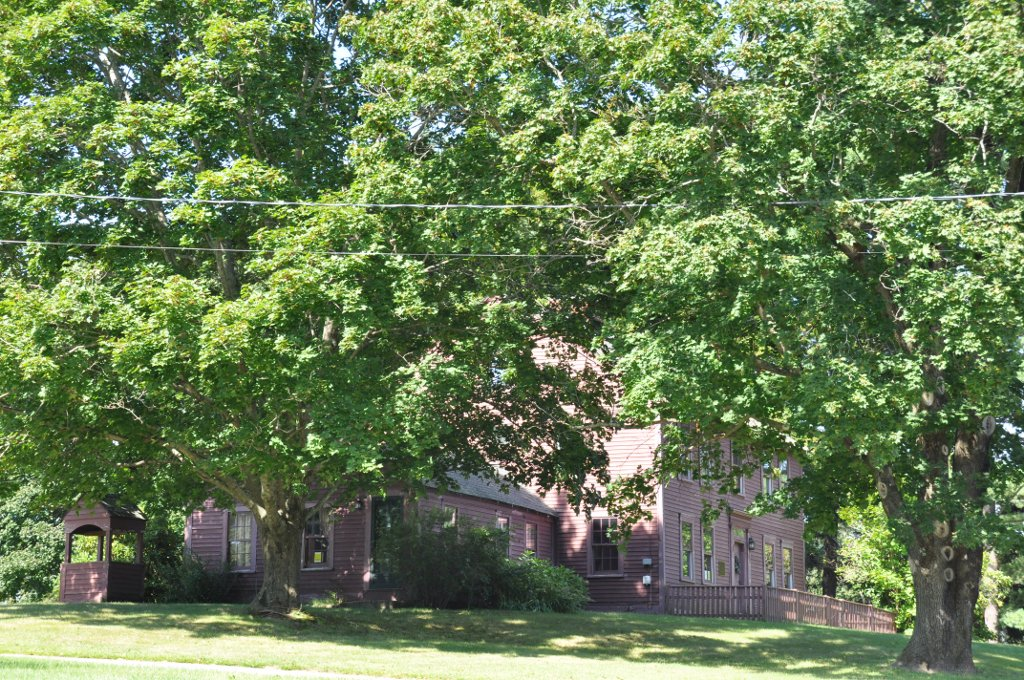

- Location within Massachusetts Location within the United States
- Location: 200 Farm St., Blackstone, Massachusetts
- Coordinates: 42°2′38″N 71°31′38″W
- Area: 9.5 acres (3.8 ha)
- Built: 1790
- Architectural style: Georgian, Federal
- NRHP reference No.: 09001174
- Added to NRHP: December 30, 2009

The Benjamin Thayer House is a historic house at 200 Farm Street in Blackstone, Massachusetts. Built around 1790, it is the best-preserved property associated with the Thayer family, who were prominent landowners and one of the first Pilgrim families. Benjamin Thayer and his descendants lived and farmed here until about 1920, when the property, much reduced in size, was sold out of the family. The house and its surrounding 9 acres (3.6 ha) of surviving farmland was listed on the National Register of Historic Places in 2009.

== Description and history ==
The Thayer House is located in a rural area of northeastern Blackstone, on the southwest side of Farm Street, historically one of the main roads joining Woonsocket, Rhode Island and Mendon, Massachusetts (of which Blackstone was a part until the 19th century). The house is set back from the road, the street lined by a low retaining wall, with period stepping stones leading to the front entrance. The house is a 2 1/2-story wood-frame structure, five bays wide, with a side-gable roof, large off-center chimney, clapboard siding, and a stone foundation. The main facade is symmetrical, with a center entrance, flanked by pilasters and topped by a transom window and entablature. A single-story gable-roofed wing extends to one side. The interior of the house has a typical Georgian center-chimney layout, with a vestibule area housing a winding staircase to the second floor, parlor chambers to its left and right, and a long kitchen in the rear with small rooms at either end. The interior retains a significant number of original fixtures and finishes, including doors and door hardware, wainscoting, and plaster.

The first Thayer to settle in Mendon's South Parish, which later became Blackstone, was Ferdinando Thayer, who probably arrived in the area in the 1670s. This house was built about 1790 by Benjamin Thayer, who purchased the land it stands on in that year. His farm of more than 100 acres (40 ha) was divided by his widow among his heirs, the property including the house going to their son-in-law, Alanson Adams. Adamses and Thayers owned the property throughout the 19th century, and it was finally sold out of the family in 1920, portions of the farmland having been progressively removed from the holding. Only two other families held the property during the 20th century.

== See also ==
- National Register of Historic Places listings in Worcester County, Massachusetts
