= Atherton Thayer =

Massachusetts farmer, military officer, town official

Norfolk County, Massachusetts Sheriff
- In office 1794–1798
- Preceded by: Ebenezer Thayer
- Succeeded by: Benjamin Clark Cutler

Personal details
- Born: February 9, 1766
- Died: July 2, 1798 (aged 32)
- Resting place: Braintree, Massachusetts

Atherton Thayer (1766-1798) was a Massachusetts farmer, military officer, town official, who served as the second sheriff of Norfolk County, Massachusetts from 1794 to 1798.

== Overview ==
He was appointed to fill the vacancy upon resignation of his half-brother, and he remained in the role until his death on July 4, 1798, at the age of 32.

Thayer was born in 1766 at Braintree in the Province of Massachusetts Bay, the 9th child of the Honorable Ebenezer Thayer Esq. (1721-1794) and Rebecca Miller of Milton, Massachusetts. His father served as a Selectman for 18 years and subsequently was a Representative to the Great and General Court for 17 years. He followed his fathers footsteps as a Selectman for Braintree and held the military rank of Captain.

His paternal ancestor, Thomas Thayer (1596-1665) had migrated to Massachusetts from Thornbury, Gloucestershire. The Thayer family prospered over the subsequent generations and went on to become known as one of the politically influential Boston Brahmin families.

His father, and his uncle (his namesake) were highly political, and both patriots. By 1759 they were both mentioned in the diary of John Adams. In 1765, his father was the recipient of the Braintree Instructions, which was co-signed by Adams and his father-in-law, the Rev. Samuel Niles. A year later Thayer was born into an influential household intent on securing independence from the realm by force. Thayer would have been accustomed to witnessing political discussions at his home. His father was a member of the Continental Congress and served as a Colonel during the revolutionary war and was elevated to the rank of Brigadier General 1st Division, Massachusetts Militia at the time of Shays' Rebellion. Thayer and his brothers served in the local militia. His fathers friend, John Adams, within ten years went on to become a key figure in the American Revolution, prior to being elected the second President of the United States in 1796. Thayer's aspirations in politics, albeit at a local level in Massachusetts would be curtailed by his untimely death in 1798 of apoplexy.

== Personal ==
His father was one of the largest land owners in Braintree, with 580 acres (230 ha). Elder brother Ebenezer received land adjoining the homestead on Elm St (proximity to Cedar St), however the ancestral home, together with 1 acre, and a part-share in a grist mill passed into the hands of Thayer in 1794.

Thayer married Hannah Sarah Jackson in Brookline, Massachusetts on May 21, 1795, a year into his role as sheriff. They had 3 children of which 2 reached adulthood. He died at the age of 32, with infant children and was buried in Braintree on July 4, 1798.

His children were orphaned upon the death of his wife in 1809, and subject to a guardianship dispute involving their stepfather Stephen Thayer. In adulthood, his daughter, Rebecca Miller Thayer legally changed her name, in honor of her deceased father to Rebecca Atherton Thayer in 1820. Four years later she married John Issac Brown.

His half brother, Ebenezer Thayer Jr. was the first sheriff of Norfolk County, and descended from his fathers first marriage to Susannah, the daughter of Rev. Samuel Niles, a co-signatory of the Braintree Instructions.

== Ancestry ==
A direct descendant of Major General Humphrey Atherton. His great grandmother was Isabella Atherton who married Nathaniel Wales. His grandmother, Rachel Wales married Captain Ebenezer Thayer (1692-1777). His father, Ebenezer Jr (1721-1794) married twice.
