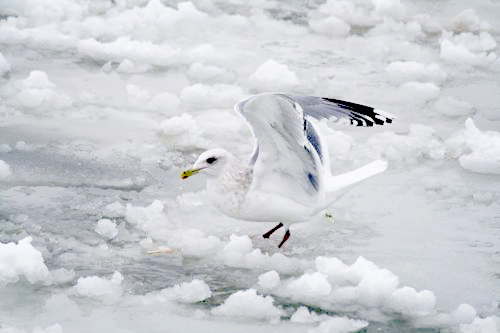

Scientific classification
- Kingdom: Animalia
- Phylum: Chordata
- Class: Aves
- Order: Charadriiformes
- Family: Laridae
- Genus: Larus
- Species: L. glaucoides
- Subspecies: L. g. thayeri

Trinomial name
- Larus glaucoides thayeri Brooks, WS, 1915

Synonyms
- Larus thayeri

= Thayer's gull =

Subspecies of bird

Thayer's gull (Larus glaucoides thayeri) is a subspecies of the Iceland gull. It is a large gull native to North America.

== Distribution ==
This gull breeds in the Arctic islands of Canada and winters primarily on the Pacific coast, from southern Alaska to the Gulf of California, though there are also wintering populations on the Great Lakes and the upper Mississippi River. The species has occurred as a vagrant to Japan, Denmark, and other parts of western Europe.

== Description ==
Somewhat intermediate between American herring gull and Iceland gull in habit and appearance and at times considered conspecific with either species, the adult Thayer's gull in nonbreeding plumage has a pale gray mantle, with obvious blackish wingtips, and extensive brown streaking on the head and neck. The head, neck, breast, belly, and underwings are primarily white, and the legs are pink. There is a red spot on the lower mandible, and the color of the iris is generally dark. In summer, the head and neck are white, with the bill turning bright yellow with a larger red spot on the lower mandible. Juvenile gulls are brown, with black bills, and black legs which quickly fade to adult pink. Thayer's Gull reaches a length of 56 to 64 cm (22 to 25 in), with a wingspan of 130 to 148 cm (51 to 58 in) and a weight of approximately 720 to 1,500 g (1.59 to 3.31 lb). Males average around 1,093 g (2.410 lb) and females, being slightly smaller, average 900 g (2.0 lb). Among standard measurements, the wing chord is 38.4 to 44.2 cm (15.1 to 17.4 in), the bill is 4.4 to 5.5 cm (1.7 to 2.2 in) and the tarsus is 5.2 to 6.9 cm (2.0 to 2.7 in).

== Behavior ==
During winter, it is found in small numbers among mixed flocks of large gulls, though it may gather in large numbers in certain locations. In summer, it is found on the tundra of high Arctic islands. These gulls will lay 3 bluish or greenish eggs in nests lined with grass, moss or lichens. Their voice consists of mostly mewing and squealing notes.

== Taxonomy ==
There is continuing debate about the taxonomic status of this species, and some authorities consider Thayer's gull to be the dark-mantled form of Iceland gull, with Kumlien's gull (variously treated as a subspecies of either Thayer's or Iceland gulls) as an intermediate example, forming a cline rather than separate species. The American Ornithologists' Union considered Thayer's gull a subspecies of American herring gull from 1917 until 1973, when they determined it was a separate species from herring gull.

After numerous papers had been written suggesting downgrading this species to a subspecies or even a morph of Iceland gull, the American Ornithologists' Union invalidated Thayer's gull as a full species in the 2017 annual supplement to the American Ornithologists' Union checklist. Thayer's gull is now considered a subspecies of Iceland Gull. The British Ornithologists' Union classified this species as a subspecies of Iceland gull in 1991. Along with the AOS, the BOU lumps the three (thayeri, kumlieni, and glaucoides) as forms of Iceland gull.

Both the common and species names honor ornithologist John Eliot Thayer, and so the first part of its name is pronounced "THAY-erz".
