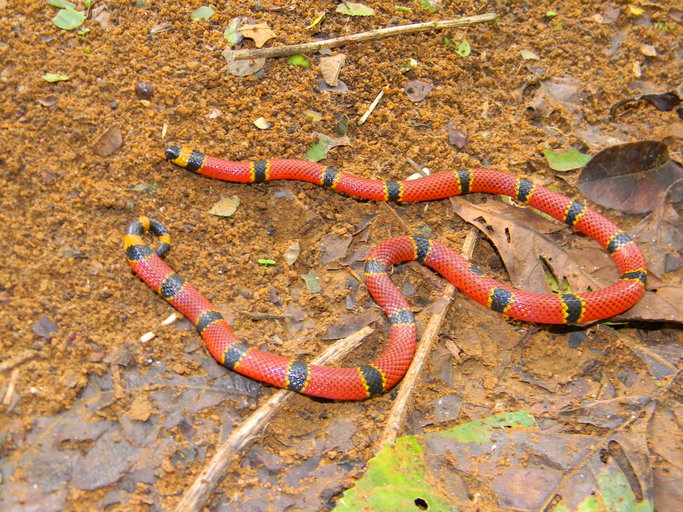

Conservation status
- Least Concern (IUCN 3.1)

Scientific classification
- Kingdom: Animalia
- Phylum: Chordata
- Class: Reptilia
- Order: Squamata
- Suborder: Serpentes
- Family: Elapidae
- Genus: Micrurus
- Species: M. browni

Binomial name
- Micrurus browni Schmidt & H.M. Smith, 1943
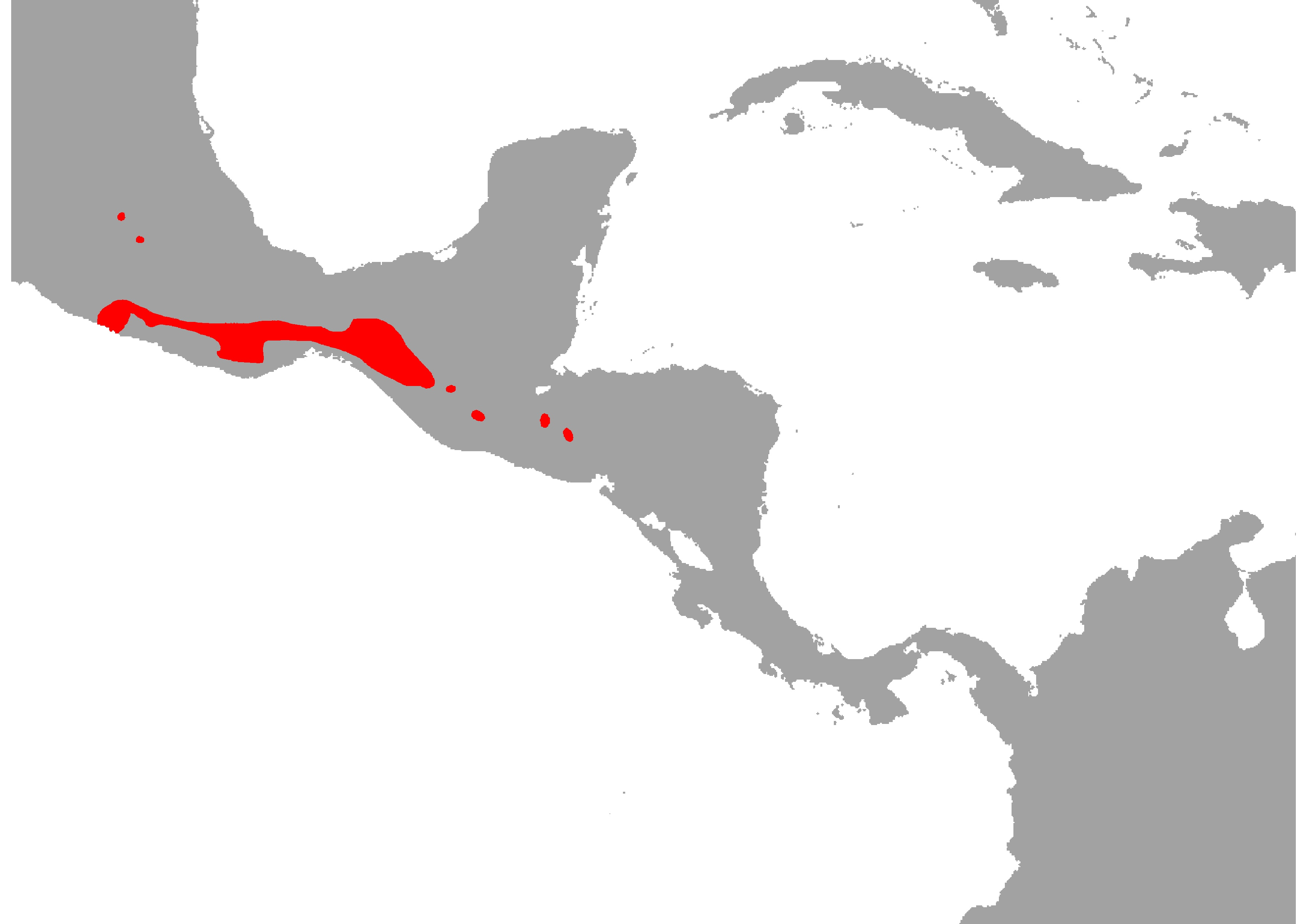

= Micrurus browni =

Species of snake

Micrurus browni, commonly known as Brown's coral snake, is a species of venomous snake in the family Elapidae. The species is native to Guatemala and southwestern Mexico. There are three recognized subspecies, including the nominate subspecies described here.

== Etymology ==
The specific name, browni, is in honor of American scientific collector Wilmot W. Brown Jr.

== Spanish common names ==
Common names for Micrurus browni in Spanish include serpiente-coralillo de Brown, coral, coral de Acapulco, coral de Antigua, coral (or coralillo) de canutos, and vibora de coral.

== Description ==
Brown's coral snake can grow to 100 cm (39 in) in total length (tail included), but it is usually 50 cm (20 in) to 70 cm (28 in). It has smooth dorsal scales, a rounded head, and the pupil of the eye is round. Its color pattern is three-colored: broad red rings, separated by 10–27 black rings, each black ring bordered by two narrow yellow rings. The snout is black. There is usually a yellow band, across the top of the head, halfway back.

== Geographic range ==
The geographic distribution of Micrurus browni is limited to Quintana Roo in southwestern Mexico, and western Guatemala, including Sacatepéquez. Previous reports for Honduras have been found to be incorrect.

== Habitat ==
Micrurus browni is mainly found in tropical deciduous forest, pine-oak forest, and cloud forest at elevations ranging from sea level up to 2,000 m (6,600 ft).

== Behavior ==
Although little is known about the behavior of Micrurus browni, like most other coral snakes it may be nocturnal, terrestrial and probably dwells in burrows, leaf litter, or under logs. While usually not aggressive, it will bite when molested or restrained.

== Diet ==
Micrurus browni preys on invertebrates, amphibians, small lizards, and other snakes.

== Reproduction ==
Like other members of the genus Micrurus, M. browni is oviparous and may lay a maximum of 15 eggs per clutch.

== Venom ==
Little is known about the effects of the venom of Micrurus browni. It may contain a neurotoxin, which can cause neuromuscular dysfunction, as is the case with the venom of other coral snakes.

== Subspecies ==
The following three subspecies of Micrurus browni are recognized as being valid.

- Micrurus browni browni Schmidt & H.M. Smith, 1943
- Micrurus browni importunus Roze, 1967
- Micrurus browni taylori Schmidt & H.M. Smith, 1943

The subspecific name, taylori, is in honor of American herpetologist Edward Harrison Taylor.
