= Pauline Revere Thayer =

American philanthropist (1862–1934)

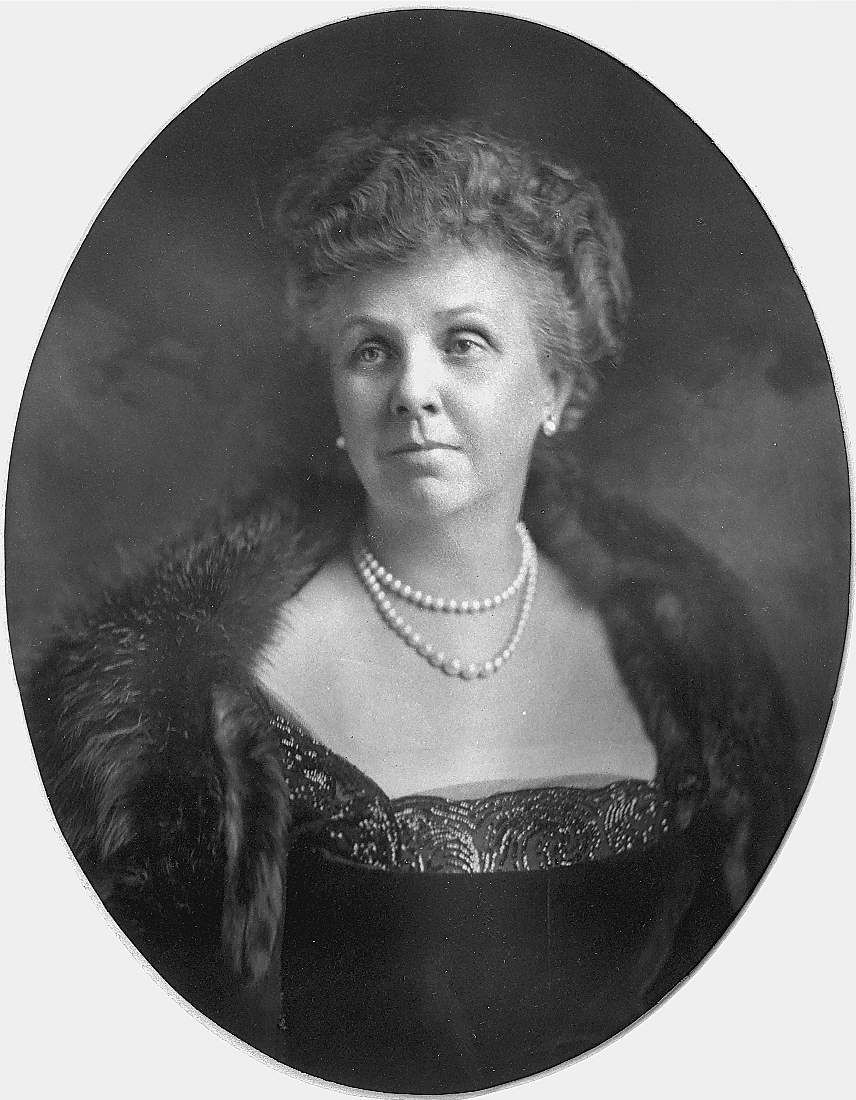
- Born: 1862; Quincy, Massachusetts, U.S.
- Died: September 29, 1934 (aged 71–72); Lancaster, Massachusetts, U.S.
- Known for: Founder of the Chilton Club
- Spouse: Nathaniel Thayer III (m. 1887)
- Relatives: Paul Revere

Pauline Revere Thayer (1862–1934) worked to improve immigrant conditions in Massachusetts and the US; represented Massachusetts in Republican party activities; and founded the Chilton Club in Boston in 1910. Born in Quincy, Massachusetts, in 1862 to Paul Joseph Revere, she was a direct descendant of Paul Revere, and in that capacity performed civic and honorary duties in his memory. She married businessman Nathaniel Thayer III in 1887. Throughout her life, she pursued charitable endeavors. In 1896 she was treasurer of the Committee of Women of the Massachusetts Volunteer Aid Association, contributing to efforts benefitting American soldiers in the Spanish–American War. She also donated funds to the Massachusetts General Hospital. In 1910 she founded the private women's Chilton Club in Boston.

Around 1916, Woodrow Wilson appointed Thayer chairman of the Women's Committee of the Massachusetts Division, Council of National Defense. She was "looked upon as advisor and confidante" to Calvin Coolidge and Herbert Hoover. From ca.1921 through ca.1931, she was head of Immigration and Americanization in the Massachusetts Department of Education. Around 1929 she was appointed "vice-chairman of Governor Frank G. Allen's Committee on Unemployment. In 1921 she was part of a national committee appointed by Immigration Commissioner Walter W. Husband to review policy related to welfare of immigrants. Thayer represented Massachusetts as a delegate in the 1924 Republican National Convention and the 1928 Republican National Committee, with Louis K. Liggett. She died on September 29, 1934, in Lancaster, Massachusetts.
