= Center Village District =

Historic district in Massachusetts, United States

- U.S. National Register of Historic Places
- U.S. Historic district
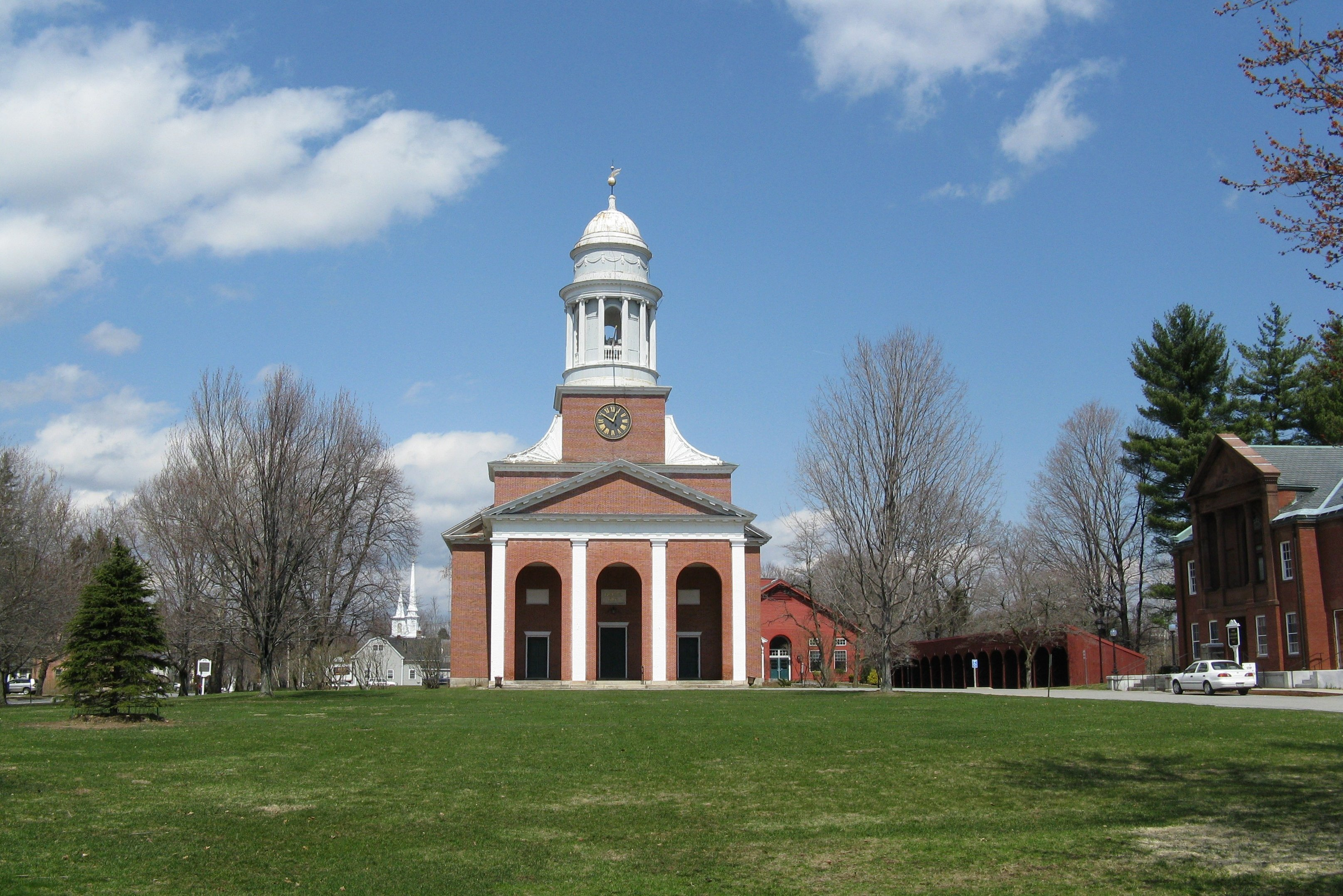
- First Church of Christ

- Location within Massachusetts Location within the United States
- Location: Main St., Lancaster, Massachusetts
- Coordinates: 42°27′26″N 71°40′19″W
- Area: 254 acres (103 ha)
- Built: 1750
- Architect: Longfellow, A.W.; Multiple
- Architectural style: Colonial Revival, Late Victorian, Federal
- NRHP reference No.: 77000198
- Added to NRHP: September 15, 1977

The Center Village District encompasses the historic village center of Lancaster, Massachusetts. Settled in 1643, it has few traces of its early history, but is now a well-kept rural town center with a predominantly residential and civic character. It includes the First Church of Christ, Lancaster, which is a U.S. National Historic Landmark, and was listed on the National Register of Historic Places in 1977.

== Description and history ==
The town of Lancaster, the oldest in Worcester County, was settled in 1643 as a trading post, and was incorporated in 1653. Its town center occupies a north-south ridge east and north of a bend in the Nashua River, which serves as the historic district boundary on those sides. The center is roughly linear in shape, extending along Main Street (Massachusetts Route 70) for about 0.8 miles (1.3 km) from its crossing of the river. Near the center of this area is the town common, which is laid out on the east side of Main Street, and is flanked on three sides by civic and religious buildings. The most prominent of these is the First Church of Christ, a masterpiece of neoclassical design by Charles Bulfinch that was completed in 1816. Adjacent to the church are a series of horse sheds. At the opposite end of the common is the town hall, a Colonial Revival work of Alexander Wadsworth Longfellow Jr. built in 1908. Between these on the east side of the common stand the Thayer Library, a Renaissance Revival building added in 1868, and the 1904 Classical Revival Center School.

Other public buildings are located in other portions of the district, which is now predominantly residential in character. Although no 17th-century buildings survive, there are a small number of 18th-century houses, and most of the others are from the 19th century. Almost all of these are of wood frame construction and 1-1/2 to 2-1/2 stories in height, giving the district a unifying character. Prominent among these is the Joseph Andrews House (1830), which has a large two-story Greek Revival temple front.

== See also ==
- National Register of Historic Places listings in Worcester County, Massachusetts
