= Grand Cayman thrush =

Conservation status
- Extinct (1940s) (IUCN 3.1)

Scientific classification
- Kingdom: Animalia
- Phylum: Chordata
- Class: Aves
- Order: Passeriformes
- Family: Turdidae
- Genus: Turdus
- Species: †T. ravidus

Binomial name
- †Turdus ravidus (Cory, 1886)

Synonyms
- Mimocichla ravida Cory, 1886

Species of bird

The Grand Cayman thrush (Turdus ravidus) is an extinct bird from the thrush family (Turdidae). It was endemic to the island of Grand Cayman in the Caribbean.

== Description ==
It was generally ashy grey with a white underbelly. Undertail coverts and the tips of the outer tail feathers were also coloured white. Exposed skin was red on the bill, feet, and around the eye. The wing length was 13.5 centimetres and the length of the tail was 11 centimetres. The bill reached a length of 2.4 centimetres and the legs were about 3.8 centimetres long.

== Habitat ==
Its habitat was in the north and north-east of Grand Cayman. It consisted of swamps and mangroves with poisonous manchineel trees (Hippomane mancinella) as well as of areas with knife-edged coral rocks and the climbing cactus (Epiphyllum hookeri).

== Extinction ==
Charles B. Cory described them as common in 1886 but shortly after its discovery, it became a favorite object for bird collectors. Twenty-one specimens were collected on four occasions in total. The first four specimens were taken in August 1886. Another three were killed in 1892 and one female was obtained in 1896. Finally, thirteen specimens were shot between April and July 1916 by bird collector W. W. Brown, Jr. Afterward this bird vanished and several surveys to find this species again failed, until zoologist C. Bernard Lewis observed one individual north of East End in the eastern of Grand Cayman in the summer of 1938. This was the last reliable report of a living Grand Cayman thrush. Causes of its extinction were most likely deforestation and the destruction of its habitat by hurricanes between 1932 and 1944. Stuffed specimens can be seen in the following museums: six in the Field Museum of Natural History in Chicago, one in the Academy of Natural Sciences in Philadelphia, two in the American Museum of Natural History in New York, one in the Natural History Museum of Berlin, seven in the Museum of Comparative Zoology, Harvard University, Cambridge, Massachusetts, one in the Natural History Museum in London, one in the National Museum of Natural History in Washington, D.C., and one in the Carnegie Museum of Natural History in Pittsburgh, Pennsylvania.
