= Chilton Club =

Social club in Boston

Coordinates: 42°21′6.26″N 71°4′40.52″W

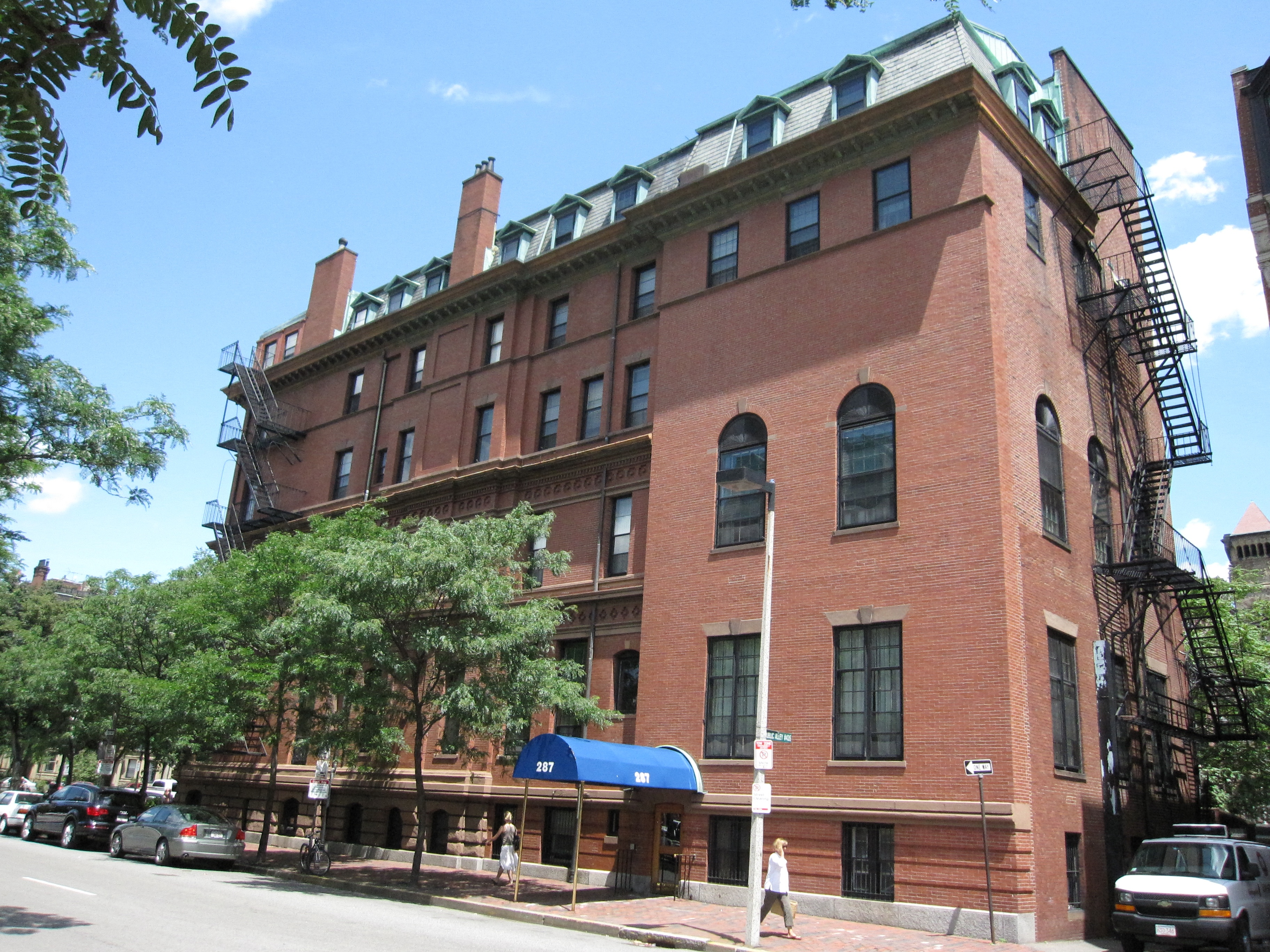
Chilton Club

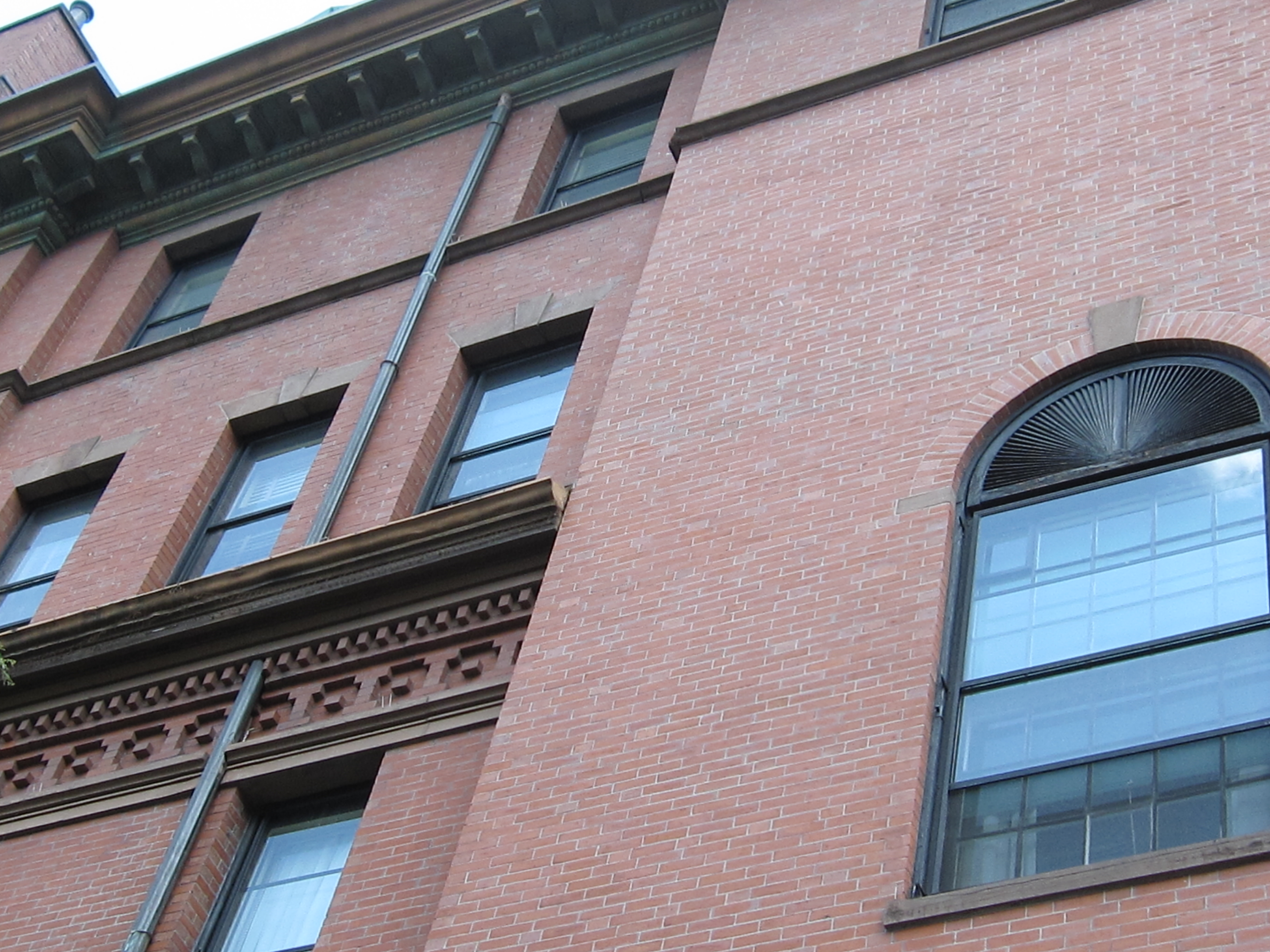
Chilton Club

The Chilton Club is a private social club established in 1910, in the Back Bay area of Boston, Massachusetts. Founded by Pauline Revere Thayer, the club was intended in part as a counterpoint to the Mayflower Club. The club was named after Mary Chilton because she had been the first woman to step out of the Mayflower.

The club has EIN 04-1174990 under the tax status 501(c)(7) Social and Recreation Clubs; in 2024 it claimed total revenue of $5,651,332 and total assets of $9,376,058. The related 152 Commonwealth Foundation Inc. has the following mission: "Is dedicated to making grants or loans to the Chilton Club for the purpose of maintaining, restoring or rebuilding the exterior of the historic buildings at 150-152 Commonwealth avenue, Boston, Massachusetts. The foundation's mission is to ensure continued public enjoyment of the property as part of Boston's Back Bay architectural district." It has EIN 82-2467536 as a 501(c)(3) Public Charity; in 2023 it claimed total revenue of $365,584 and total assets of $975,615.

The club occupies a large red brick building on Commonwealth Avenue, designed in 1870 by architect "Henry Richards of the firm of Ware and Van Brunt." (However, some claim the building was designed by architects Peabody and Stearns.) The building has been altered and expanded over the years.

"On May 18, 1910, the Chilton Club applied for (and subsequently received) permission to significantly remodel and expand the house, including removing the original third floor, with its mansard roof, and adding three additional floors, two of brick and the third "in roof." They also received permission to construct an addition at the rear, 38 feet by 18 feet 9 inches, five stories high above the basement, four of brick and one "in roof." The Club retained the firm of Richardson, Barott, and Richardson, and the work was overseen by F. L. W. Richardson, son of the noted architect Henry Hobson Richardson. The addition was completed in February 1911. ... On May 28, 1926, the Club acquired 150 Commonwealth, which had remained in the Baker Estate until the previous year. They remodeled the house, combining it with 152 Commonwealth."

Some early members included:

- Katherine Abbott
- Mrs. Rodolphe L. Agassiz
- Mrs. Isabel Weld Perkins Anderson (Mrs. Larz Anderson)
- Mrs. Nelson Bartlett
- Mrs. Henry Forbes Bigelow
- Helen C. Burnham
- Ellen Bullard
- Mrs. Harold J. Coolidge
- Mrs. Philip Dexter
- Marion H. Fenno
- Pauline Fenno
- Mrs. Henry S. Grew
- Mrs. Edward Burlingame Hill
- Mrs. Henry S. Hunnewell
- Mrs. John S. Lawrence
- Mrs. Lester Leland
- Mrs. Robert W. Lovett
- Mrs. E. Preble Motley
- Mrs. Henry Parkman
- Mrs. Richard S. Russell
- Mrs. Henry H. Sprague
- Pauline Revere Thayer
- Ruth Thayer
- Mrs. Bayard Warren
- Mrs. Edwin S. Webster
- Mrs. C. Minot Weld
- Mrs. Frederick S. Whitwell
- Mary E. Williams
- Mrs. Frederic Winthrop
- Eleonora Sears
