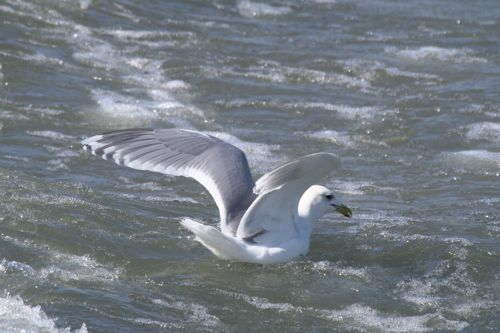

Scientific classification
- Kingdom: Animalia
- Phylum: Chordata
- Class: Aves
- Order: Charadriiformes
- Family: Laridae
- Genus: Larus
- Species: L. glaucoides
- Subspecies: L. g. kumlieni

Trinomial name
- Larus glaucoides kumlieni Brewster, 1883

= Kumlien's gull =

Subspecies of bird

Kumlien's gull (Larus glaucoides kumlieni) is a subspecies of the Iceland gull. It is a large gull which breeds in the Arctic regions of Canada. It is migratory, wintering from Labrador south to New England and west across the Great Lakes. The subspecies is named after the naturalist Ludwig Kumlien. It is a regular vagrant in small numbers to Britain and Ireland.

It has variably been considered a full species, a subspecies of Thayer's gull, a subspecies of Iceland gull, and a hybrid between the aforementioned species, all of which are considered subspecies of the Iceland gull as of 2017.

This gull was first described as a new species Larus kumlieni by William Brewster which at the time he named it "Lesser Glaucous-winged Gull" due to its resemblance to the larger west coast species, in 1883 based on a specimen obtained by Ludwig Kumlien from the Cumberland Sound during the Howgate Arctic Expedition. This taxon breeds colonially or singly on coasts and cliffs, making a nest lined with grass, moss or seaweed on the ground or cliff. Normally, two or three light brown eggs are laid.

The taxon is pale in all plumage, with a remarkably variable amount of pigment in the primaries. Individuals range from completely white-winged (indistinguishable from nominate L. glaucoides Iceland gull) to so dark in the wings as to be indistinguishable from Thayer's gull. Eye color is also variable, from pale yellow to dark brown. Such remarkable variation seems to lend credence to the belief that Kumlien's gull is in fact a hybrid swarm.

Kumlien's gulls average smaller overall and much smaller-billed than the very large glaucous gull and are usually smaller than herring gull. The taxon reaches adult plumage in four to five years. The call is a "laughing" cry like the herring gull's, but higher pitched.

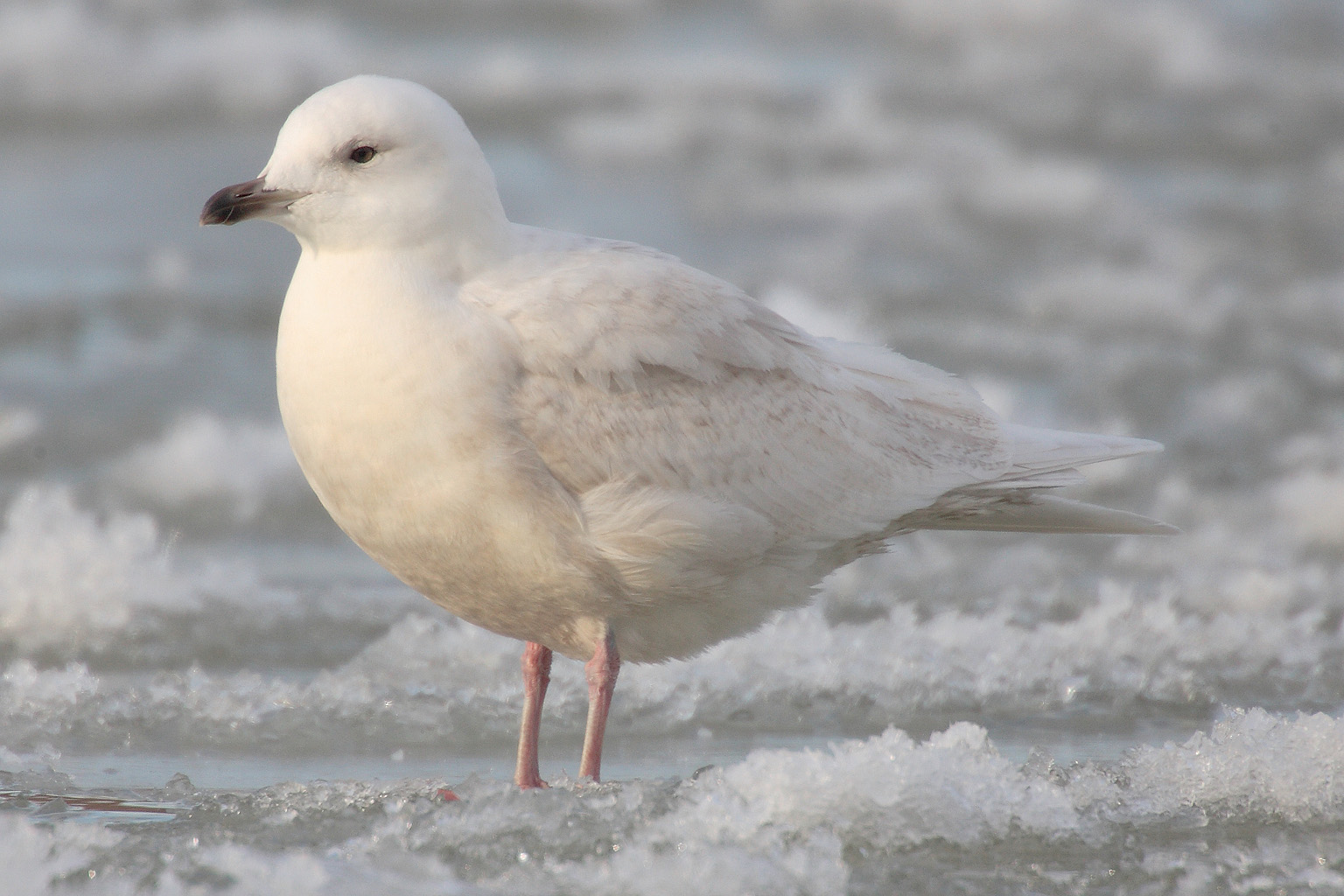
A pale-extreme first cycle Kumlien's gull photographed in Toronto, Ontario: Birds with white wingtips such as this may not be separable from nominate L. glaucoides.

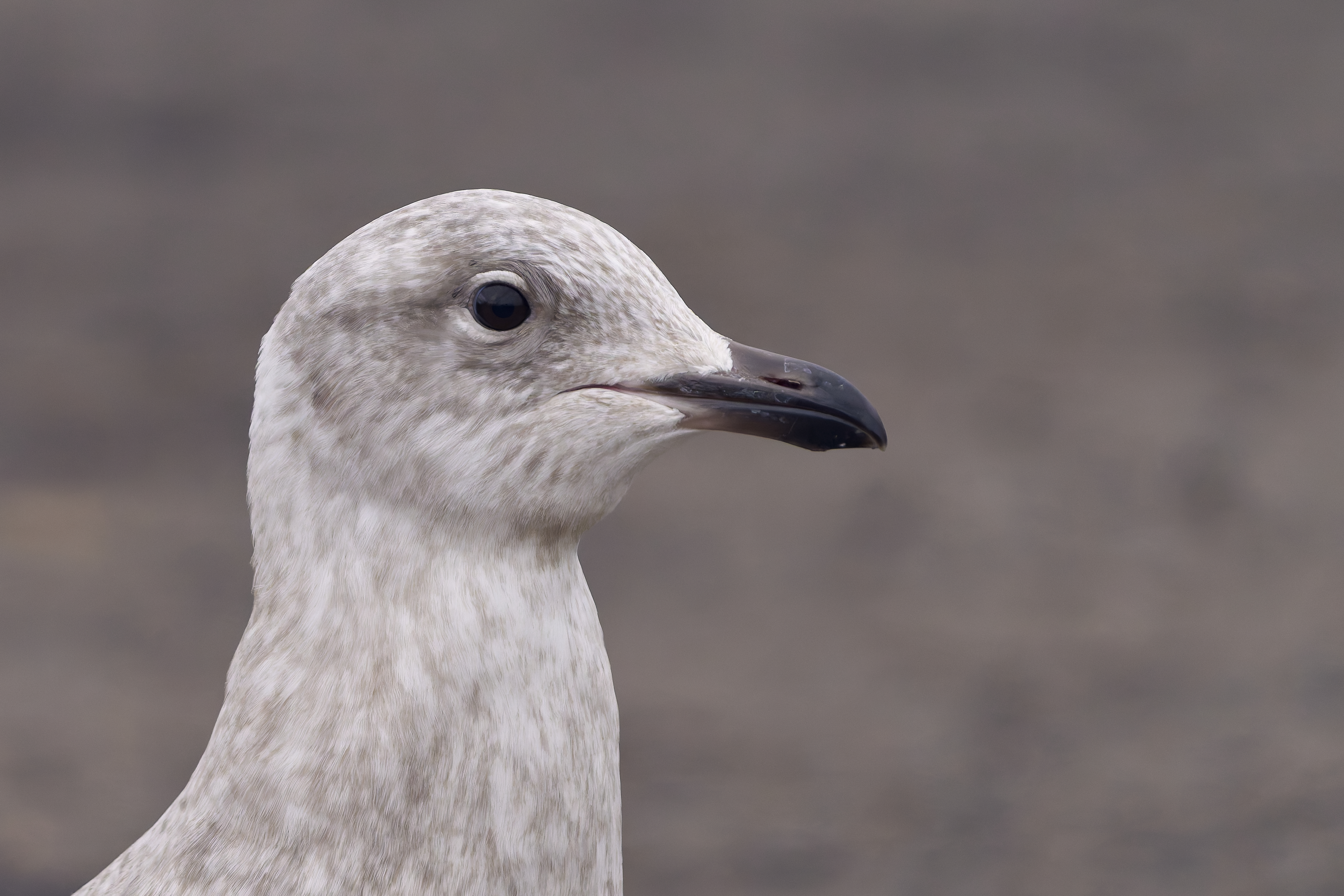
Close up of 1st winter individual

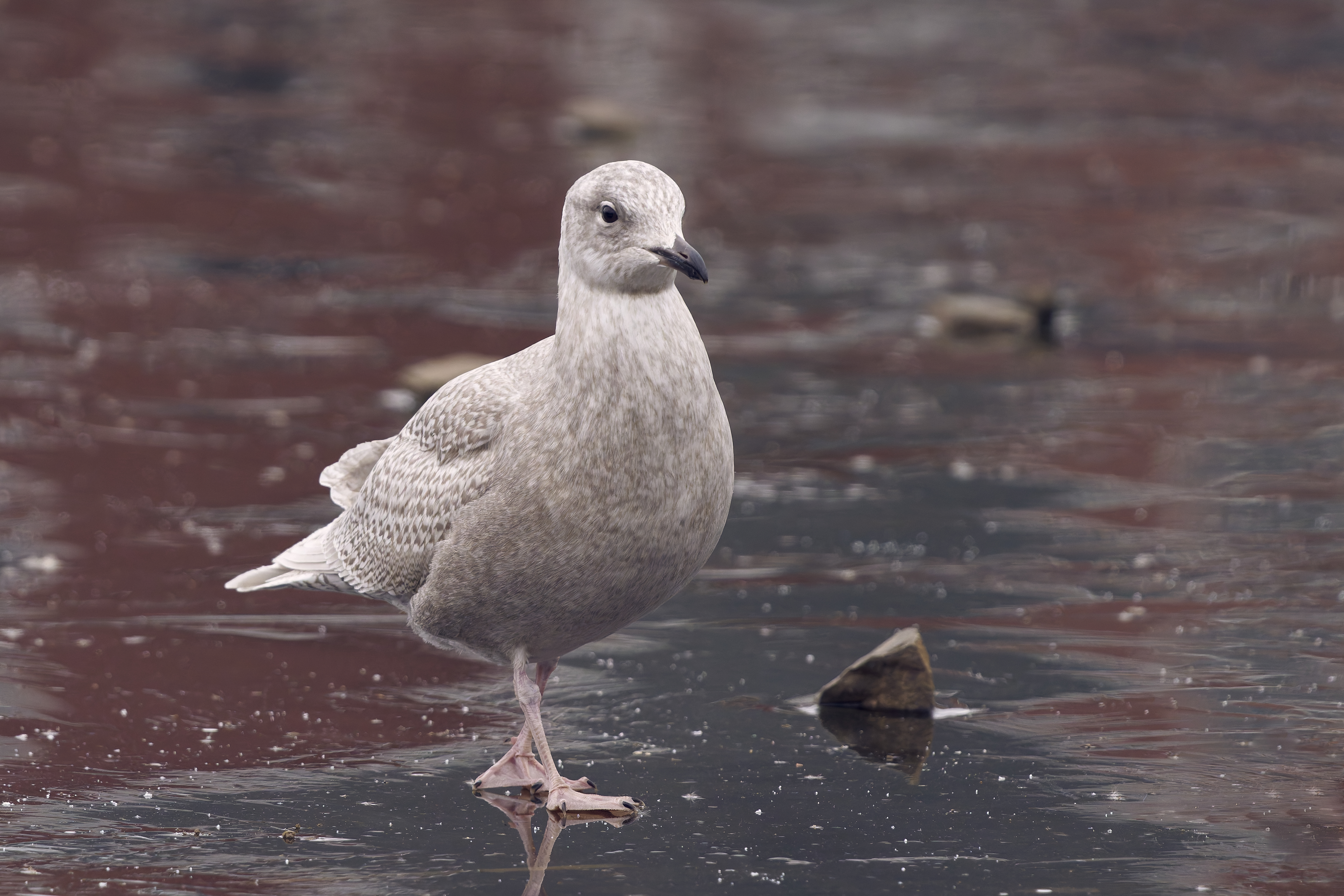
On a frozen pond

These are omnivores like most Larus gulls, and they scavenge and seek suitable small prey. These birds forage while flying, picking up food at or just below the water's surface, and feed while walking or swimming. Their scavenging habits lead them to frequent garbage dumps, sewage outlets, and places where fish are cleaned.
