= First Church of Christ, Unitarian =

Historic church in Massachusetts, United States

Coordinates: 42°27′19.6″N 71°40′23.0″W

- First Church in Lancaster, Unitarian Universalist
- U.S. National Register of Historic Places
- U.S. National Historic Landmark
- U.S. Historic district – Contributing property
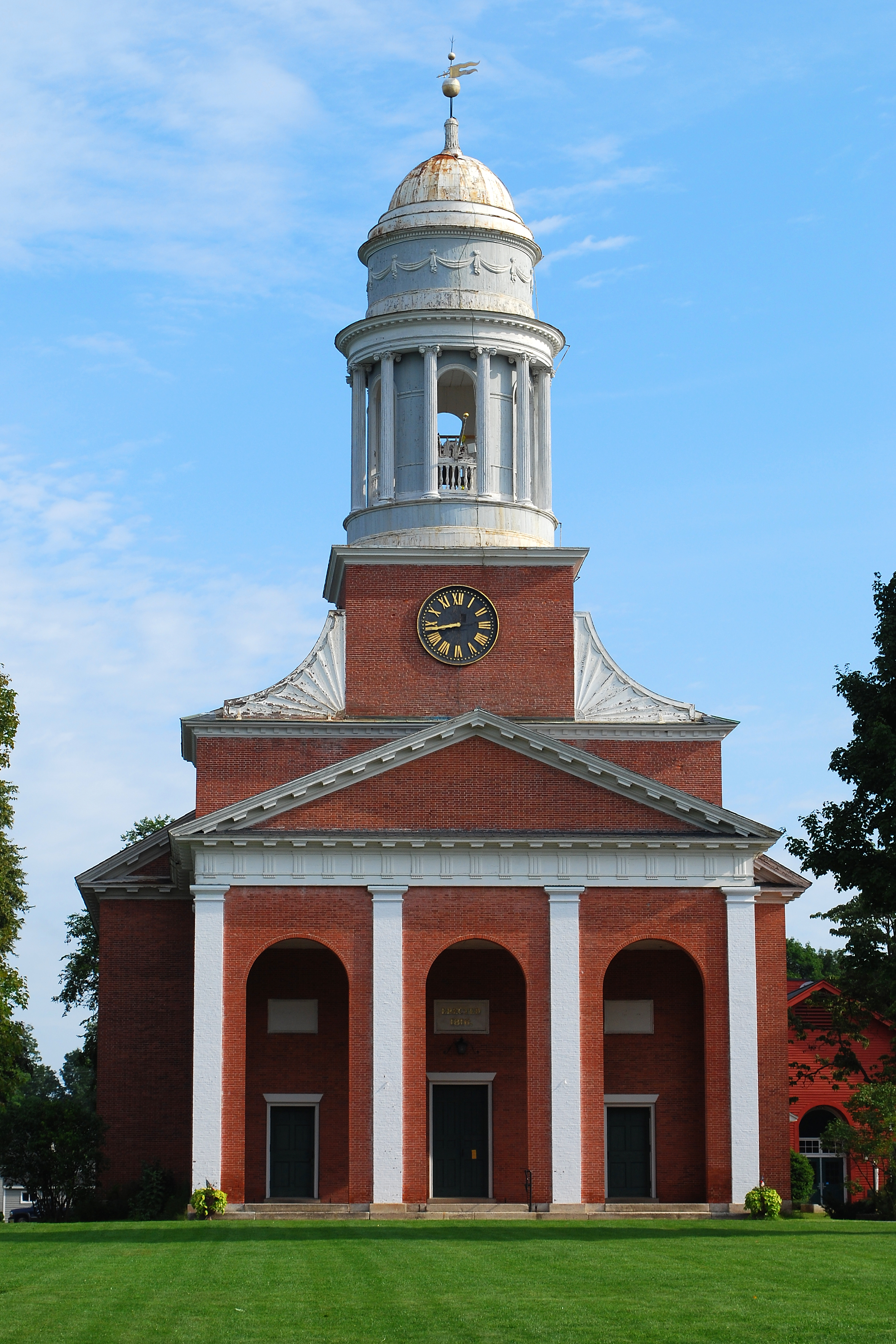
- First Church of Christ Unitarian: Its Fifth Meeting House designed by architect Charles Bulfinch, built 1815–1817.

- Location within Massachusetts Location within the United States
- Location: Lancaster, Massachusetts
- Area: 2 acres (0.81 ha)
- Built: 1816
- Architect: Charles Bulfinch
- Architectural style: Federal style
- Part of: Center Village District (ID77000198)
- NRHP reference No.: 70000897

Significant dates
- Added to NRHP: December 30, 1970
- Designated NHL: December 30, 1970
- Designated CP: September 15, 1977

The First Church of Christ, Unitarian, also known as First Church in Lancaster and colloquially as "the Bulfinch Meetinghouse", is a historic congregation with its meeting house located at 725 Main Street facing the Common in Lancaster, Massachusetts. The church's fifth meeting house, built in 1816, was designed by architect Charles Bulfinch, and was designated a National Historic Landmark in 1977, recognizing it as one of Bulfinch's finest works.

== History ==
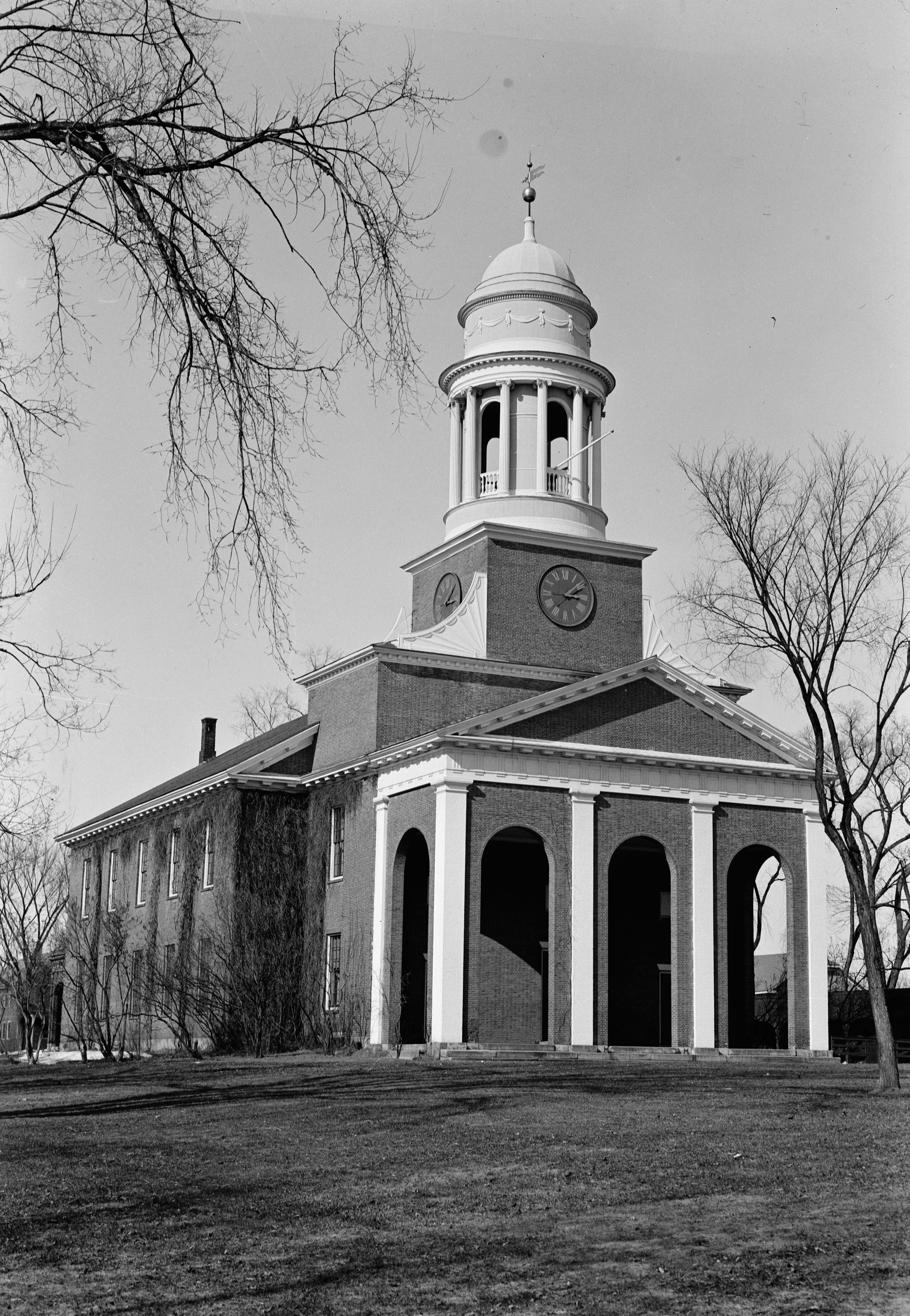

First Church of Christ was "gathered in 1653 by the Puritans of Massachusetts Bay Colony." The town of Lancaster also dates from 1653. The current meeting house was built in 1816 of local brick and slate when Nathaniel Thayer was minister.

On December 30, 1970, the meeting house was added to the National Register of Historic Places and designated a National Historic Landmark. Architectural historian G. E. Kidder Smith has called it "one of the great federal style churches in the country."

In May 2010, the Church began a restoration of the meeting house cupola and facade supported by contributions from the Bulfinch Fund, a secular organization dedicated to restoring Bulfinch's works. Formerly a Congregational church, it is now Unitarian Universalist. Rev. Wil Darcangelo, M.Div, currently serves as its 18th called minister.

== Architecture ==
The church is a rectangular structure with a projecting front section supporting a two-stage tower, and with an arcaded and pedimented portico at the very front. The portico consists of three high openings with round-arch tops, which frame three entry doors (the central one taller) behind. The arches are separated by pilasters, which rise to an entablature and a fully enclosed gable pediment. The pediment is lined by modillioned cornices, with plain brickwork in the tympanum. The sides of the portico are also arched and pilastered. The tower section, whose interior houses the vestibule area, rises the full width of the portico to the height of the gable peak, where there is a cornice line, above which rises the tower, flanked by carved wooden fan designs. The first stage of the tower is square, with clock faces adorning otherwise plain brick walls. Above a cornice is the second stage, a round section with a partially open belfry surrounded by twelve Ionic columns, which support an entablature and dentillated cornice. An attic section decorated with swag drapery rises above the belfry, and is topped by a round dome and weathervane.

== See also ==
- First Church of Christ (disambiguation)
- List of National Historic Landmarks in Massachusetts
- National Register of Historic Places listings in Worcester County, Massachusetts
