= Ebenezer Thayer =

American politician

Ebenezer Thayer, Jr.

Norfolk County, Massachusetts Sheriff
- In office 1793–1794
- Preceded by: New office
- Succeeded by: Atherton Thayer

Personal details
- Born: August 21, 1746 Braintree, Massachusetts
- Died: May 30, 1809 (aged 62)
- Spouse(s): Rachel Thayer, m. December 19, 1772
- Occupation: Farmer

Military service
- Allegiance: United States of America
- Branch/service: Massachusetts provincial militia
- Years of service: Militia
- Commands: Massachusetts provincial militia
- Battles/wars: American Revolutionary War

Ebenezer Thayer, Jr. (August 21, 1746 – May 30, 1809) was a Massachusetts farmer, military officer, town official, and politician who served in both branches of the Massachusetts legislature, as a member of the Massachusetts Governor's Council; and, from 1793 to 1794, as the first sheriff of Norfolk County, Massachusetts.

The Braintree Instructions, drafted by John Adams, were addressed to Thayer's father, Ebenezer Thayer, Esq., from his constituents in Braintree.

== Military service ==
During the American Revolutionary War Thayer was active in recruiting men in his home town and in leading them in the war.

== Family ==
His half-brother was Atherton Thayer.

Over a number of generations the Thayer family became known as a Boston Brahmin family and descended from early settlers and brothers Thomas Thayer (1596–1665) and Richard Thayer (1601–1664).
