= Wilmot W. Brown Jr. =

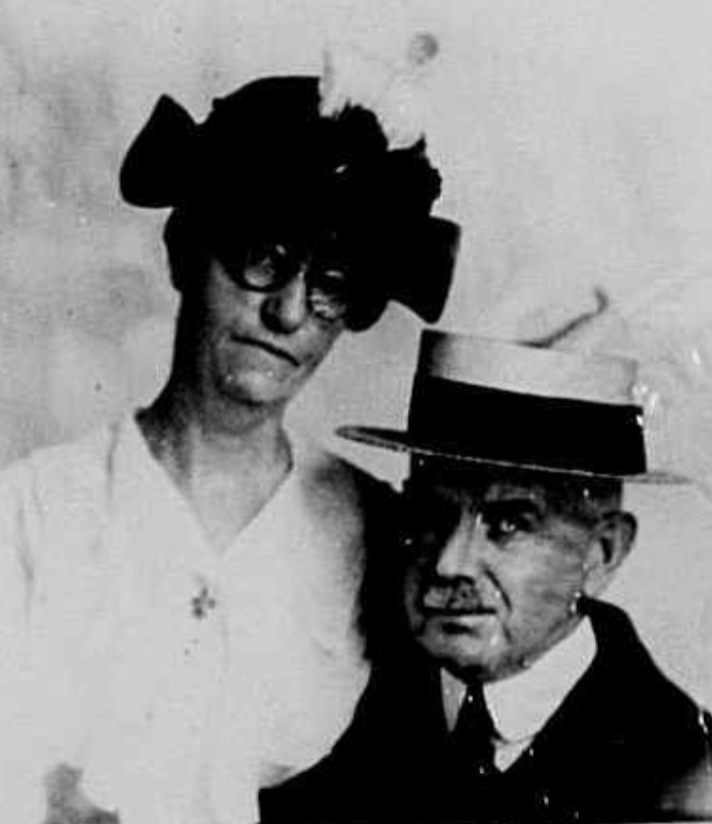
Wilmot W. Brown Jr. and Grace Wood (1921)

Wilmot Wood Brown Jr. (ca. 1878–1953) was a scientific collector who was active from 1890–1953. He worked extensively in the Neotropics, including the Caribbean, Panama, Colombia, as well as Mexico and the US states of Florida, Georgia, and Alabama. He collected over 18,000 bird specimens, but also several hundred mammal and reptile specimens. His professional relationship with Outram Bangs lasted thirty years, with Bangs sponsoring many of his trips.

He grew up in Somerville, Massachusetts, where he began collecting specimens of local bird species. In contemporary times, Clark has been criticized for his apathy towards bird conservation; he collected species known to be in decline. He was the last known collector of the Cuban oriole on Grand Cayman Island (though the bird still lives in Cuba) and the final collector of the extinct Grand Cayman thrush. Because rare birds were in high demand by collectors, Brown likely created bounties for local hunters to kill certain species and bring them to him, including the now-extinct imperial woodpecker.

He is the eponym for the timberline wren (Thryorchilus browni) and the snakes Micrurus browni and Mixcoatlus browni.
