= Nathaniel Thayer Jr. =

American financier and philanthropist

Nathaniel Thayer II
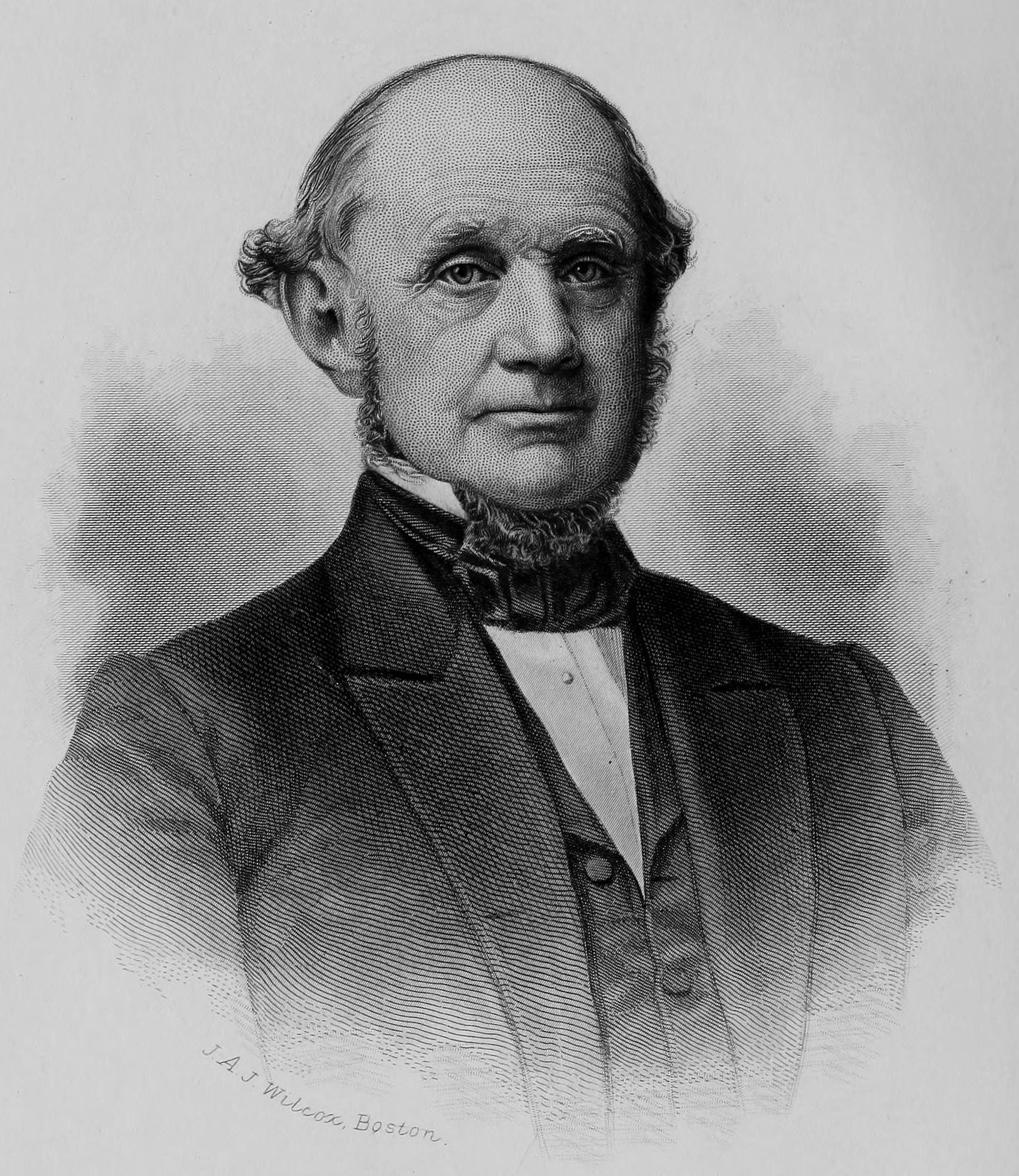
- Born: September 11, 1808; Lancaster, Massachusetts
- Died: March 7, 1883 (aged 74); Boston, Massachusetts
- Spouse: Cornelia Patterson Van Rensselaer
- Children: 7
- Parent(s): Nathaniel Thayer; Sarah Parker Toppan
- Relatives: Stephen Van Rensselaer IV (father-in-law)

Signature
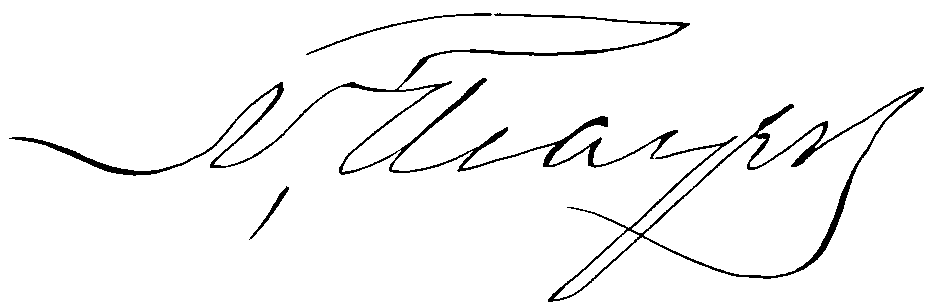

Nathaniel Thayer II (11 September 1808 in Lancaster, Massachusetts – 7 March 1883 in Boston) was an American financier, philanthropist, and the father of John Eliot Thayer II, an amateur ornithologist.

== Early life ==
He was the son of Nathaniel Thayer I (1769–1840), a Unitarian congregational minister of Lancaster, Massachusetts, and Sarah Parker Toppan, daughter of Christopher Toppan and Sarah Parker.

=== Banking ===
His brother John Eliot Thayer I had been operating a successful banking firm in Boston. When he needed more people, he asked Nathaniel Thayer II to be his business partner, now calling the firm John E. Thayer and Brother. The firm was active in the development of railroads in the western United States, several of which Thayer was a director. The firm was also involved with other enterprises such as manufacturing which required large amounts of capital. Thayer became senior director of the firm on the death of his brother in 1857. He gradually acquired a large fortune.

He was known as the “honest banker” because he sold money at the legal rate unlike most, for the time. In 1865 Nathaniel Thayer II retired, sold his business to his partners and lived primarily in The Homestead for “he preferred the woods and fields to the streets and crowds”. He then lived in Lancaster with his wife Cornelia Van Rensselaer Thayer until his death in 1883.

=== Philanthropy ===
He was a fellow of Harvard in 1868-1875, and one of its largest benefactors. He contributed to a commons hall, erected Thayer Hall in 1870 as a memorial of his father and brother, bore the expenses of Louis Agassiz's 1865-66 expedition to South America (known as the Thayer Expedition; which his son Stephen Van Rensselaer Thayer also joined as a research assistant), built a fire-proof herbarium at the botanic garden, and gave much in aid of poor students of the college. He was one of the most generous citizens of Boston.

== Personal life ==
He married Cornelia Paterson Van Rensselaer (1823–1897), daughter of Stephen Van Rensselaer IV, in 1846. Together, they had seven children:

- Stephen Van Rensselaer Thayer (1847–1871), who married Alice Robeson, a daughter of Andrew Robeson Jr.
- Cornelia Van Rensselaer Thayer (1849–1903), who married J. Hampden Robb (1846–1911) in 1868.
- Nathaniel Thayer III (1851–1911)
- Harriet Van Rensselaer Thayer (1853–1891)
- Eugene Van Rensselaer Thayer (1855–1907)
- Bayard Thayer (1862–1916), a yachtsman and horticulturalist who married Ruth Simpkins (1864–1941).
- John Eliot Thayer (1862–1933), an amateur ornithologist who married Evelyn Duncan Forbes.

Although Nathaniel Thayer II lived in Boston for many years, he always regarded himself as belonging to Lancaster. He is quoted as saying "Lancaster is my greatest monument."

=== Descendants ===
His granddaughter, Cornelia Van Rensselaer Thayer (b. 1881) married Danish Count Carl Moltke (1869–1935) in 1907.

The family lived in that house along with their other two houses, one in Boston and the other in Newport RI called The Edgemere.

=== Honors and memberships ===
Elected a member of the American Antiquarian Society in 1866.
