= Algonquin Club =

Private social club in Boston, Massachusetts

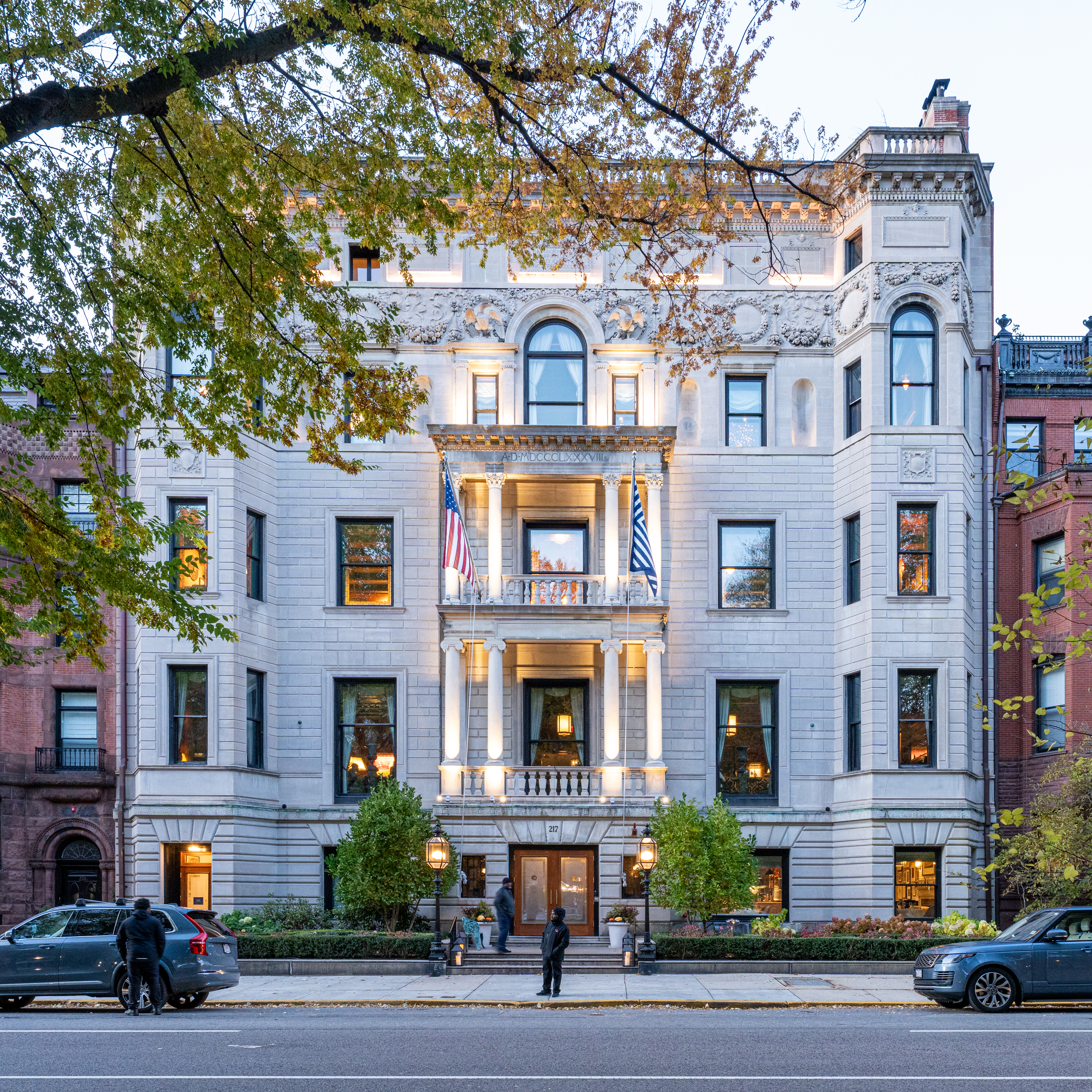
The Algonquin Club (2025) at 217 Commonwealth Avenue in Boston

The Algonquin Club of Boston, presently known as The 'Quin House, is a private social club in Boston, Massachusetts, founded in 1886. Originally a business-themed gentlemen's club, it is now open to men and women of all races, religions, and nationalities.

Algonquin Club of Boston Inc. has EIN 04-1021230 under tax status 501(c)(7) Social and Recreation Clubs; in 2024 it claimed total revenue of $47,410 and total assets of $1,499,740. The Algonquin Club Foundation Ltd. has EIN 46-0932957 as a 501(c)(3) Public Charity; in 2023 it claimed total revenue of $1,758 and total assets of $155,428.

== History ==
The Algonquin Club of Boston was founded by a group that included General Charles Taylor. Its clubhouse on Commonwealth Avenue was designed by McKim, Mead & White and completed in 1888, and was soon called "the finest and most perfectly appointed club-house in America" and more recently the "most grandiose" of Boston's clubs.

In October 2020, the club closed for renovations, including a new fitness facility and a roof deck, and re-opened as the 'Quin House in July 2021. It remained a private club. The 'Quin House maintains reciprocal relationships with more than 150 social clubs worldwide.

== See also ==
- List of gentlemen's clubs in the United States
