= Braintree Instructions =

1765 document in Massachusetts

The Braintree Instructions was a document sent on September 24, 1765, by the town meeting of Braintree, Massachusetts to the town's representative at the Massachusetts General Court, or legislature, which instructed the representative to oppose the Stamp Act 1765, a tax regime which had recently been adopted by the British Parliament in London. The document is significant because, following the Virginia Resolves, it was among the earliest in British America to officially reject the authority of Parliament over the colonies in North America. The instructions were written by John Adams, who would ten years later become a key figure in the American Revolution and ultimately be elected the second President of the United States in 1796.

== Background ==
The Stamp Act 1765 (short title Duties in American Colonies Act 1765; 5 Geo. 3. c. 12) required that many printed materials in the colonies be produced on stamped paper made in London and carrying an embossed revenue stamp. These printed materials were legal documents, magazines, newspapers and many other types of paper used throughout the colonies. The tax was to be paid in valid British currency, not in colonial paper money. The purpose of the tax was to help pay for troops stationed in North America after the British victory in the French and Indian War.

Negative reaction to the tax in British America was concerned not only with economic hardship imposed by it but also by constitutional issues of taxation without representation and enforcement by courts without juries. In May, 1765 in Virginia, the House of Burgesses passed a series of resolutions promoted by Patrick Henry which objected specifically to the imposition of tax without representation. In Massachusetts, opposition to the tax was strong in Boston. On June 6, 1765, the Massachusetts Lower House proposed a meeting for the 1st Tuesday of October in New York City:

That it is highly expedient there should be a Meeting as soon as may be, of Committees from the Houses of Representatives or Burgesses in the several Colonies on this Continent to consult together on the present Circumstances of the Colonies, and the difficulties to which they are and must be reduced by the operation of the late Acts of Parliament for levying Duties and Taxes on the Colonies, and to consider of a general and humble Address to his Majesty and the Parliament to implore Relief.

Opposition to the previously imposed Sugar Act in Boston was led in 1764 by Samuel Adams. In Braintree, a village south of Boston, Adams' cousin John Adams was a young lawyer who had become active in politics. In preparation for the planned meeting which would eventually be realized as the Stamp Act Congress, John Adams drafted instructions issued to the town's representative, Ebenezer Thayer, Esq., outlining opposition to the tax on several constitutional grounds. The Braintree Instructions were published in the Massachusetts Gazette on October 10, 1765, and four days later in the Boston Gazette. Eventually Adams' language was adopted by over forty other towns in Massachusetts, including portions which were used by Samuel Adams in the document drafted for Boston.

== Summary ==
Adams traveled from his home in the North Precinct of Braintree to the town hall located on the site of the present day First Congregational Church near the intersection of Washington and Elm Streets to discuss his draft of instructions with a committee of town residents. In his writing, Adams began by addressing the economic burden of the tax but proceeded to indict Parliament for violating major principles of English law that had existed for centuries under Magna Carta, which he referred to in English as the Great Charter. In the third and longest paragraph of the instructions, Adams wrote: "But the most grievous innovation of all, is the alarming extension of the power of courts of admiralty." Adams argued that the imposition of the tax to be enforced by judges without benefit of a jury trial was a severe violation of fundamental rights. The instructions were unanimously adopted by the committee.

== Full text ==
The following is the full text of the Braintree Instructions, adopted by town meeting in Braintree, Province of Massachusetts Bay, on September 24, 1765.

To Ebenezer Thayer, Esq.

Sir,—

In all the calamities which have ever befallen this country, we have never felt so great a concern, or such alarming apprehensions, as on this occasion. Such is our loyalty to the King, our veneration for both houses of Parliament, and our affection for all our fellow-subjects in Britain, that measures which discover any unkindness in that country towards us are the more sensibly and intimately felt. And we can no longer forbear complaining, that many of the measures of the late ministry, and some of the late acts of Parliament, have a tendency, in our apprehension, to divest us of our most essential rights and liberties. We shall confine ourselves, however, chiefly to the act of Parliament, commonly called the Stamp Act, by which a very burthensome, and, in our opinion, unconstitutional tax, is to be laid upon us all; and we subjected to numerous and enormous penalties, to be prosecuted, sued for, and recovered, at the option of an informer, in a court of admiralty, without a jury.

We have called this a burthensome tax, because the duties are so numerous and so high, and the embarrassments to business in this infant, sparsely settled country so great, that it would be totally impossible for the people to subsist under it, if we had no controversy at all about the right and authority of imposing it. Considering the present scarcity of money, we have reason to think, the execution of that act for a short space of time would drain the country of its cash, strip multitudes of all their property, and reduce them to absolute beggary. And what the consequence would be to the peace of the province, from so sudden a shock and such a convulsive change in the whole course of our business and subsistence, we tremble to consider. We further apprehend this tax to be unconstitutional. We have always understood it to be a grand and fundamental principle of the constitution, that no freeman should be subject to any tax to which he has not given his own consent, in person or by proxy. And the maxims of the law, as we have constantly received them, are to the same effect, that no freeman can be separated from his property but by his own act or fault. We take it clearly, therefore, to be inconsistent with the spirit of the common law, and of the essential fundamental principles of the British constitution, that we should be subject to any tax imposed by the British Parliament; because we are not represented in that assembly in any sense, unless it be by a fiction of law, as insensible in theory as it would be injurious in practice, if such a taxation should be grounded on it.

But the most grievous innovation of all, is the alarming extension of the power of courts of admiralty. In these courts, one judge presides alone! No juries have any concern there! The law and the fact are both to be decided by the same single judge, whose commission is only during pleasure, and with whom, as we are told, the most mischievous of all customs has become established, that of taking commissions on all condemnations; so that he is under a pecuniary temptation always against the subject. Now, if the wisdom of the mother country has thought the independency of the judges so essential to an impartial administration of justice, as to render them independent of every power on earth,—independent of the King, the Lords, the Commons, the people, nay, independent in hope and expectation of the heir-apparent, by continuing their commissions after a demise of the crown, what justice and impartiality are we, at three thousand miles distance from the fountain, to expect from such a judge of admiralty? We have all along thought the acts of trade in this respect a grievance; but the Stamp Act has opened a vast number of sources of new crimes, which may be committed by any man, and cannot but be committed by multitudes, and prodigious penalties are annexed, and all these are to be tried by such a judge of such a court! What can be wanting, after this, but a weak or wicked man for a judge, to render us the most sordid and forlorn of slaves?—we mean the slaves of a slave of the servants of a minister of state. We cannot help asserting, therefore, that this part of the act will make an essential change in the constitution of juries, and it is directly repugnant to the Great Charter itself; for, by that charter, “no amerciament shall be assessed, but by the oath of honest and lawful men of the vicinage;” and, “no freeman shall be taken, or imprisoned, or disseized of his freehold, or liberties of free customs, nor passed upon, nor condemned, but by lawful judgment of his peers, or by the law of the land.” So that this act will “make such a distinction, and create such a difference between” the subjects in Great Britain and those in America, as we could not have expected from the guardians of liberty in “both.”

As these, sir, are our sentiments of this act, we, the freeholders and other inhabitants, legally assembled for this purpose, must enjoin it upon you, to comply with no measures or proposals for countenancing the same, or assisting in the execution of it, but by all lawful means, consistent with our allegiance to the King, and relation to Great Britain, to oppose the execution of it, till we can hear the success of the cries and petitions of America for relief.

We further recommend the most clear and explicit assertion and vindication of our rights and liberties to be entered on the public records, that the world may know, in the present and all future generations, that we have a clear knowledge and a just sense of them, and, with submission to Divine Providence, that we never can be slaves.

Nor can we think it advisable to agree to any steps for the protection of stamped papers or stamp-officers. Good and wholesome laws we have already for the preservation of the peace; and we apprehend there is no further danger of tumult and disorder, to which we have a well-grounded aversion; and that any extraordinary and expensive exertions would tend to exasperate the people and endanger the public tranquillity, rather than the contrary. Indeed, we cannot too often inculcate upon you our desires, that all extraordinary grants and expensive measures may, upon all occasions, as much as possible, be avoided. The public money of this country is the toil and labor of the people, who are under many uncommon difficulties and distresses at this time, so that all reasonable frugality ought to be observed. And we would recommend particularly, the strictest care and the utmost firmness to prevent all unconstitutional draughts upon the public treasury.

Samuel Niles, John Adams, Norton Quincy, James Penniman, John Hayward.
