= Nathaniel Thayer =

American Congregationalist minister (1769–1840)

The Reverend Nathaniel Thayer
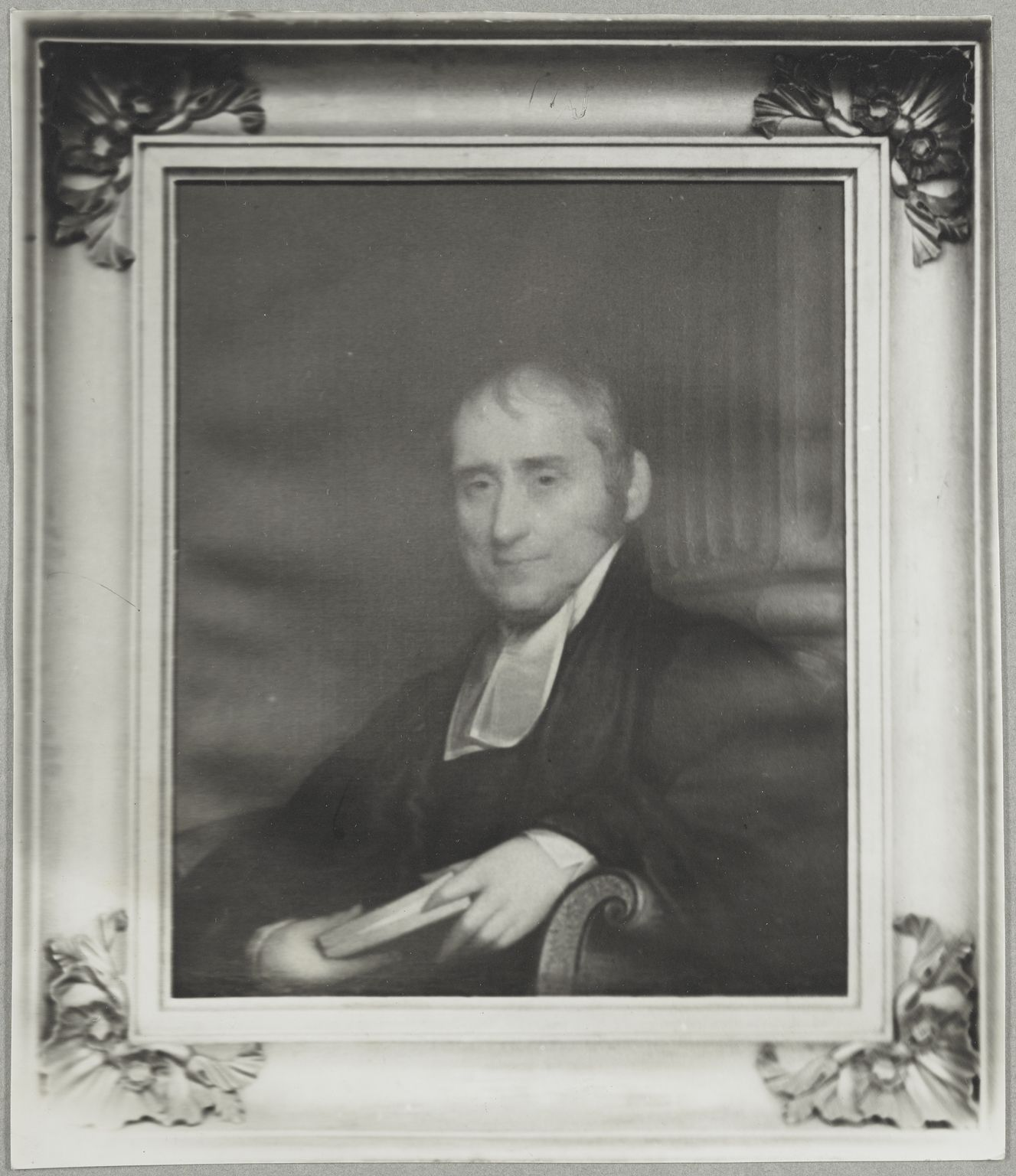
- portrait attributed to Gilbert Stuart
- Born: July 11, 1769; Hampton, New Hampshire, British America
- Died: June 23, 1840 (aged 70); Rochester, New York, U.S.
- Education: Harvard College
- Spouse: Sarah Parker Toppan (m. 1795)
- Children: 8, including Nathaniel
- Parents: Ebenezer Thayer; Martha Cotton Thayer

Nathaniel Thayer (July 11, 1769 – June 23, 1840) was a congregational Unitarian minister.

== Early life ==
Nathaniel Thayer was born in Hampton, New Hampshire to Ebenezer Thayer and Martha Olivia Cotton. His father was a pastor in Hampton for many years. His maternal grandfather was John Cotton of Newton, Massachusetts, who was the great-grandson of John Cotton.

== Career ==
Thayer graduated from Phillips Exeter Academy, then Harvard College in 1789 and was ordained junior pastor of a Congregational meeting house in Lancaster, Massachusetts on October 9, 1793. In 1789 the town of Lancaster gave him land on Main street, just south of the church, to build a permanent residence. There he built a twelve-room home. He received a Doctor of Divinity degree from Harvard in 1817. The Lancaster congregation's fifth meeting house designed by Charles Bulfinch in 1816, was built during his tenure.

Respected for his "tact and sagacity", Thayer's involvement was often sought to settle ecclesiastical disputes across the state of Massachusetts. As a result, in his 47 years as a minister, he served on more than 150 church councils, and he frequently drew up the decisions.

For a number of years, Thayer was involved in a dispute with James G. Carter, then-Deacon of Thayer's congregation and later a member of the Massachusetts House of Representatives, over the latter's refusal to return funds donated toward the establishment of an instructional academy that failed to materialise. Thayer publicly denounced Carter's actions and called on him to reimburse donors of the failed project. Carter, however, refused and was eventually removed from his position as the church's Deacon. Messerli (1965) argues that Carter's alienation of Thayer (and, by extension, most of the state's clergy) significantly contributed to his loss to Horace Mann in the 1837 election for the position of Secretary of the just-established Massachusetts Board of Education, the first state board of education in the United States.

== Personal life ==
On October 22, 1795, Thayer married Sarah Parker Toppan, daughter of Christopher Toppan and Sarah Parker, by whom he had eight children.

- Sarah "Sally" Toppan Thayer (1796–1831)
- Martha Thayer (b. 1798)
- Mary Ann Thayer (b. 1800)
- Nathaniel Thayer (1802) died of "fits" at 6 weeks
- John Elliott Thayer (1803–1857), who married Adele Granger (1819–1892), the daughter of U.S. Representative Francis Granger in 1855. After his early death, she married Robert Charles Winthrop (1809–1894).
- Christopher Toppan Thayer (b. 1805)
- Nathaniel Thayer, Jr. (1808–1883), who married Cornelia Patterson Van Rensselaer (1823–1897), daughter of Stephen Van Rensselaer IV.
- Abigail Thayer (1812–1834)

Thayer died June 30, 1840, in Rochester, New York at the age of 71, "while journeying for pleasure & improvement of his health, to the falls at Niagara on a trip for health reasons."
