= Benjamin W. Leigh =

American politician

Benjamin Watkins Leigh
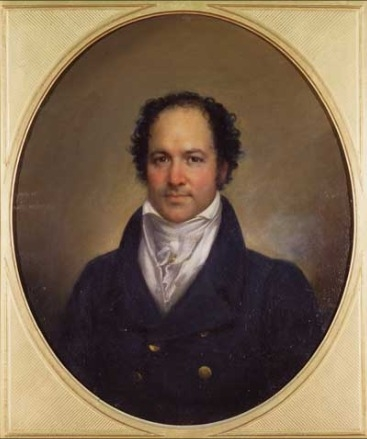

United States Senator from Virginia
- In office February 26, 1834 – July 4, 1836
- Preceded by: William C. Rives
- Succeeded by: Richard E. Parker

Member of the Virginia House of Delegates from Dinwiddie County
- In office 1811–1813

Personal details
- Born: June 18, 1781 Chesterfield County, Virginia
- Died: February 2, 1849 (aged 67) Richmond, Virginia
- Party: National Republican
- Spouse(s): Mary Selden Watkins (m. 1802; died 1813) Susan Colston (m. 1813, died) Julia Wickham (m. 1821; died 1849)
- Education: College of William & Mary
- Profession: Lawyer, politician

Benjamin Watkins Leigh (June 18, 1781 – February 2, 1849) was an American lawyer and politician from Richmond, Virginia. He served in the Virginia House of Delegates and represented Virginia in the United States Senate.

== Early and family life ==
Benjamin Watkins Leigh was born at "Gravel Hill", the glebe of Dale Parish in Chesterfield County on June 18, 1781, the son of the Reverend William Leigh (d. 1787) and Elizabeth (née Watkins) Leigh (d. 1799). He attended the College of William and Mary, studied law, and began practicing in Petersburg in 1802, as well as helped raise his younger brother William.

== Career ==
After representing Dinwiddie County in the Virginia House of Delegates 1811-13, Leigh moved to Richmond, where he rose rapidly in his chosen profession. He prepared the revised Code of Virginia in 1819, was a delegate to the Virginia Constitutional Convention of 1829-1830, a reporter of the Virginia Court of Appeals 1829-41, and was again elected to the Virginia legislature, representing Henrico County in the session of 1830-31. Leigh was appointed by the state legislature as a Whig to the United States Senate to fill the vacancy caused by the resignation of William Cabell Rives; he was reelected in 1835.

During Leigh's time in the Senate, the controversy over slavery reached new levels of intensity. The House of Representatives passed a "gag rule" tabling all anti-slavery petitions, and a similar measure died in the Senate, though that body approved an alternate method of ignoring such petitions. President Jackson called on the Congress to censor anti-slavery publications from the federal mails, a bill the Senate defeated 25-19. Leigh proposed a statewide boycott of pro-emancipation newspapers, writing that Virginians had the right "to suppress to the utmost of our power what we deem inflammatory, dangerous, mischievous."

Every State had expressed the disapproval of South Carolina's nullification and it was Leigh who was sent to urge South Carolina to desist from carrying matters to extremities. Leigh served until his resignation on July 4, 1836. Thereafter he resumed the practice of law in Richmond.

Benjamin Watkins Leigh was a founding member (1831) of the Virginia Historical Society and first chairman of its standing committee.

== Personal life ==
Leigh was married three times. His first marriage was on December 24, 1802, to Mary Selden Watkins (c. 1784–1813), a daughter of Thomas Watkins and Rebecca Cary (née Selden) Watkins.

After Mary's death in 1813, he married Susanna "Susan" Colston (b. 1792), a daughter of merchant Rawleigh Thomas Colston and Elizabeth (née Marshall) Colston (sister of Chief Justice John Marshall), on November 30, 1813. Before her death, they were the parents of two children:

- William B. Leigh (1814–1888), who married Gabriella "Ella" Wickham, a daughter of John Wickham, in 1850. After her death in 1851, he married Mary White Colston, a daughter of U.S. Representative Edward Colston and, his second wife, Sara Jane (née Brockenbrough) Colston, in 1854.
- Mary Susan Selden Leigh (1816–1900), who married Conway Robinson.

After his Susan's death, he married Julia Wickham (1801–1883), a daughter of John Wickham and Elizabeth Selden (née McClurg) Wickham, on November 24, 1821. Together, they were the parents of:

- Elizabeth Wickham Leigh (1824–1895), who married Charles Meriwether Fry, the President of the Bank of New York from 1876 to 1892.
- John Wickham Leigh (1824–1904), who married Camille Bowie, a daughter of Thomas Hamilton Bowie Jr., in 1841.
- Chapman Johnson Leigh (1828–1911), who married Annie C. Carter, a daughter of Hill Carter and Mary Braxton (née Randolph) Carter, in 1860.
- Julia Wickham Leigh (1828–1916), who married Dr. Thomas Randolph Harrison in 1849.
- Maj. Benjamin Watkins Leigh Jr. (18 January 1831 Richmond, Virginia – 3 July 1863 Battle of Gettysburg), who married Helen Leckie Jones, a daughter of James Y. Jones, on 18 April 1855. Their very handsome sons were: William Leigh (b. 1856), Benjamin Watkins Leigh III (known as Watkins, b. 1859), and Robert Leckie Leigh (b. June 1863). Their daughter Mary Leigh became the wife of T.C. Bailey Jr of Raleigh, but died early in the marriage leaving a daughter, Helen Bailey.
- Anne Carter Leigh (1832–1917), who married Charles Old Jr., a son of William Old.
- Virginia Leigh (1835–1866), who married Dr. Francis Peyre Porcher in 1855.
- Alice Leigh (1843–1913), who never married.

Leigh died in Richmond on February 2, 1849, and is buried in Shockoe Hill Cemetery.

=== Legacy ===
His home at Richmond, the Benjamin Watkins Leigh House, was listed on the National Register of Historic Places in 1969.

== Sources ==
- Dictionary of American Biography
- Dunn, Susan. Dominion of Memories: Jefferson, Madison, & the Decline of Virginia. Cambridge: Basic Books, 2007
- Hall, Cline Edwin. “The Political Life of Benjamin Watkins Leigh.” Master’s thesis, University of Richmond, 1959
- Macfarland, William H. An Address on the Life, Character, and Public Services of the Late Hon. Benjamin Watkins Leigh. Richmond: Macfarlane and Fergusson, 1851.
- Encyclopedia of Virginia Biography, Volume II

U.S. Senate
Preceded by William C. Rives	U.S. senator (Class 2) from Virginia; February 26, 1834 – July 4, 1836; Served alongside: John Tyler, Jr., William C. Rives	Succeeded by Richard E. Parker
