= James Bowen (railroad executive) =

American railroad executive (1808–1886)

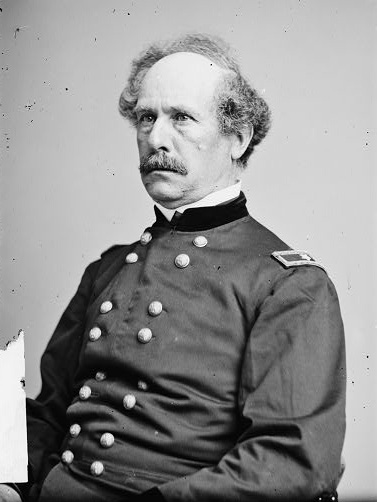
- Born: February 25, 1808; New York, New York
- Died: September 29, 1886 (aged 78); Hastings-on-Hudson, New York
- Military career
- Allegiance: (United States) United States; Union
- Branch: United States Army; Union Army
- Rank: Brigadier general
- Conflicts: American Civil War

James Bowen (February 25, 1808 – September 29, 1886) was the president of Erie Railroad who served as a Union Army general during the American Civil War.

== Biography ==
James Bowen was born in New York City on February 25, 1808. His father was a merchant of ample means, and the son was liberally educated. He was not trained to any profession or business calling, but he cultivated habits of business voluntarily and intuitively. He was a close and persistent student of public affairs, and among his intimate associates were Daniel Webster, Gen. James Watson Webb, William H. Seward, Philip Hone, Moses H. Grinnell, Charles A. Peabody (subsequently of national fame as a jurist, who is the only survivor of that notable coterie), and men of similar cast and bent of mind. Most of them were members of a then famous society known as the Hone Club. Its membership was not only exclusive but limited. Healey's celebrated painting of Webster belonged to this club, and a resolution was passed by the club that the painting should pass to the heirs of the last surviving member. James Bowen was that one, and the painting is now in the possession of Gen. Alexander S. Webb, of New York, to whom it was willed by him.

Early in life Mr. Bowen developed a taste for rural life, and he purchased an estate in Westchester County, which was ever after his home. Railroad affairs attracted his attention while the New York and Erie Railroad was in its earliest struggles, and it was at the request of James Watson Webb that he took a leading part in the direction of that company. He was elected a director in 1839; vice-president and treasurer, April 30, 1840, and president pro tern, May 27, 1841, and president in October, 1841.

Upon the passage of the act creating the Metropolitan Police of New York City in 1857, James Bowen was appointed by Governor King one of the first Board of Police Commissioners under that act, his associates in the Board being Simeon Draper, James W. Nye (afterward United States Senator), James S. T. Stranahan, and Jacob Chandler. Mr. Bowen was elected president of the Board, and had charge during the exciting and riotous days of Mayor Fernando Wood's organized but unsuccessful opposition to the replacing of his police force by the new one.

During the Civil War Mr. Bowen organized six regiments of volunteers. He ceased to be president of the Police' Board at the close of 1862. He was appointed general of the brigade composed chiefly of the six regiments he had enlisted. He went to New Orleans with his command, where he served one year, when he was appointed provost marshal of that department, which embraced Louisiana, Texas, Arkansas, Mississippi, and Alabama, as far as the United States Government had regained control over these States. Just before the war ended General Bowen was compelled by broken health to resign from the army. He returned home, and was soon appointed a Commissioner of Charity and Correction of New York City. While he was in office the Legislature increased the salary of these commissioners from §5,000 to $10,000 a year. General Bowen declared at a meeting of the Board that the increase was an outrage, and he resolutely refused to receive more than the former salary. The attitude he took in the matter resulted in the repeal of the law that authorized the increase. General Bowen served two terms as charity commissioner, and introduced the ambulance system in the hospital service. He greatly improved the standing and efficacy of Bellevue Hospital, by insisting that the best medical skill should be employed there, with the result that to-day a course in the Bellevue Hospital practical schooling in medicine and surgesis considered recommendation sufficient as to the capacity of any beginner in the professional practice of medical science.

=== Family ===
In 1842 James Bowen married Eliza Livingston. She died in 1872. In 1874 he married Josephine Oothout, daughter of John Oothout, then president of the Bank of New York. He survived her, and married Athenia Livingston, a cousin of his first wife. There were no children by either marriage.

General Bowen died September 29, 1886, at Hastings-on-Hudson, New York, where he owned a fine estate, his home being preeminently one of culture and refinement. He was a man of entirely domestic habits, of quiet temperament and fine literary taste. His widow married Judge Peabody, his old-time warm friend and associate.

== Work ==
=== Start of Erie Railroad presidency ===
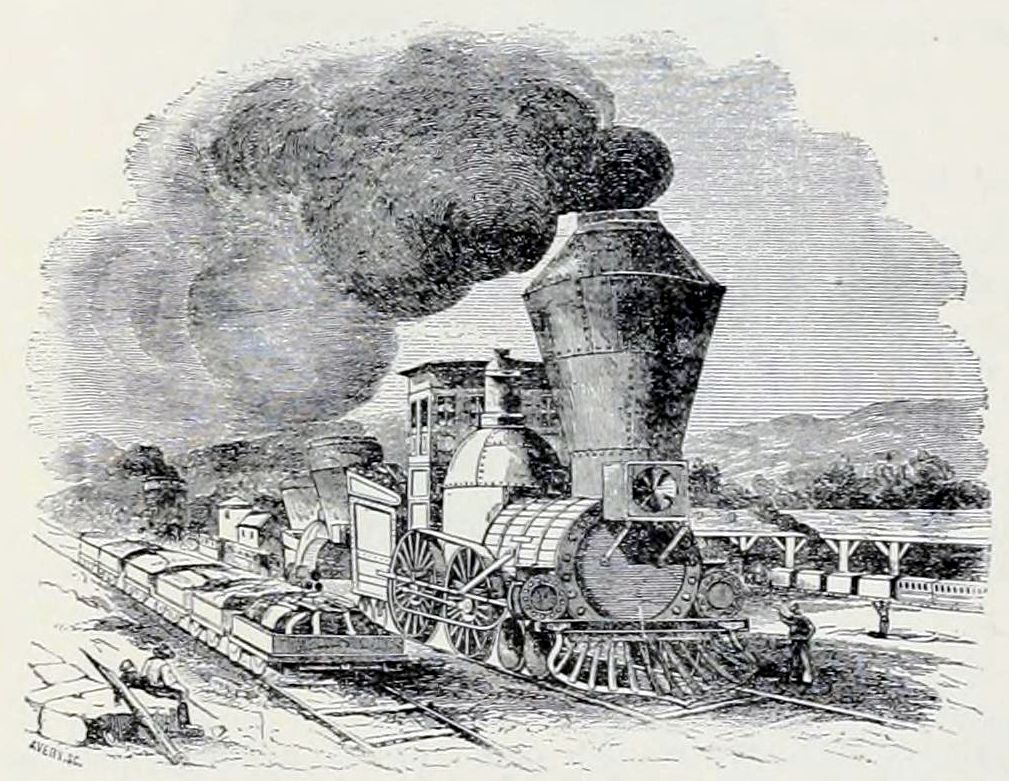
Erie Locomotive in 1840s.

James Bowen who was then Vice-President and Treasurer, was elected to succeed Eleazar Lord as President of the company, and he presided on the historic occasion when the first portion of the New York and Erie Railroad was opened for traffic, although it was through no direct effort of his that the work had progressed thus far. Others who had been striving and hoping for years for even this consummation of the long-laid plans had no active part in the event. Upon many such not even the courtesy of being an invited guest was bestowed.

Mr. Bowen was a native of New York City, a man of wealth, a member of the Union Club, and of the Kent Club, famous in that day, in which James Watson Webb, Moses H. Grinnell, Richard M. Blatchford, and similar spirits, were conspicuous. President Bowen was a leader in that coterie, and was especially an intimate of General Webb. The latter had supported the New York and Erie project in his paper, New York Courier and Enquirer, from the beginning, and it was as a friend of his that James Bowen entered the Directory of the company, and through his influence that Bowen was advanced to the Presidency.

So far as the public knew, the affairs of Erie were easy. Work was actively progressing all along the line. On the Eastern Division it had reached a stage so near completion, that it was only a matter of a few weeks when the track would be laid the entire distance between Piermont and Goshen and the railroad put in operation. In fact, a month after Bowen became president, a train was run between Piermont and Ramapo, a distance of twenty miles. Already the fact that, even with the railroad in operation on the Eastern Division, its Eastern terminus would still be nearly twenty-five miles from New York City, which distance was to be overcome by steamboat between the city and Piermont, began to excite much discussion, and the advantage that would accrue to the Company if it might have the terminus at or near New York became apparent to observant people, who gave the matter thought.

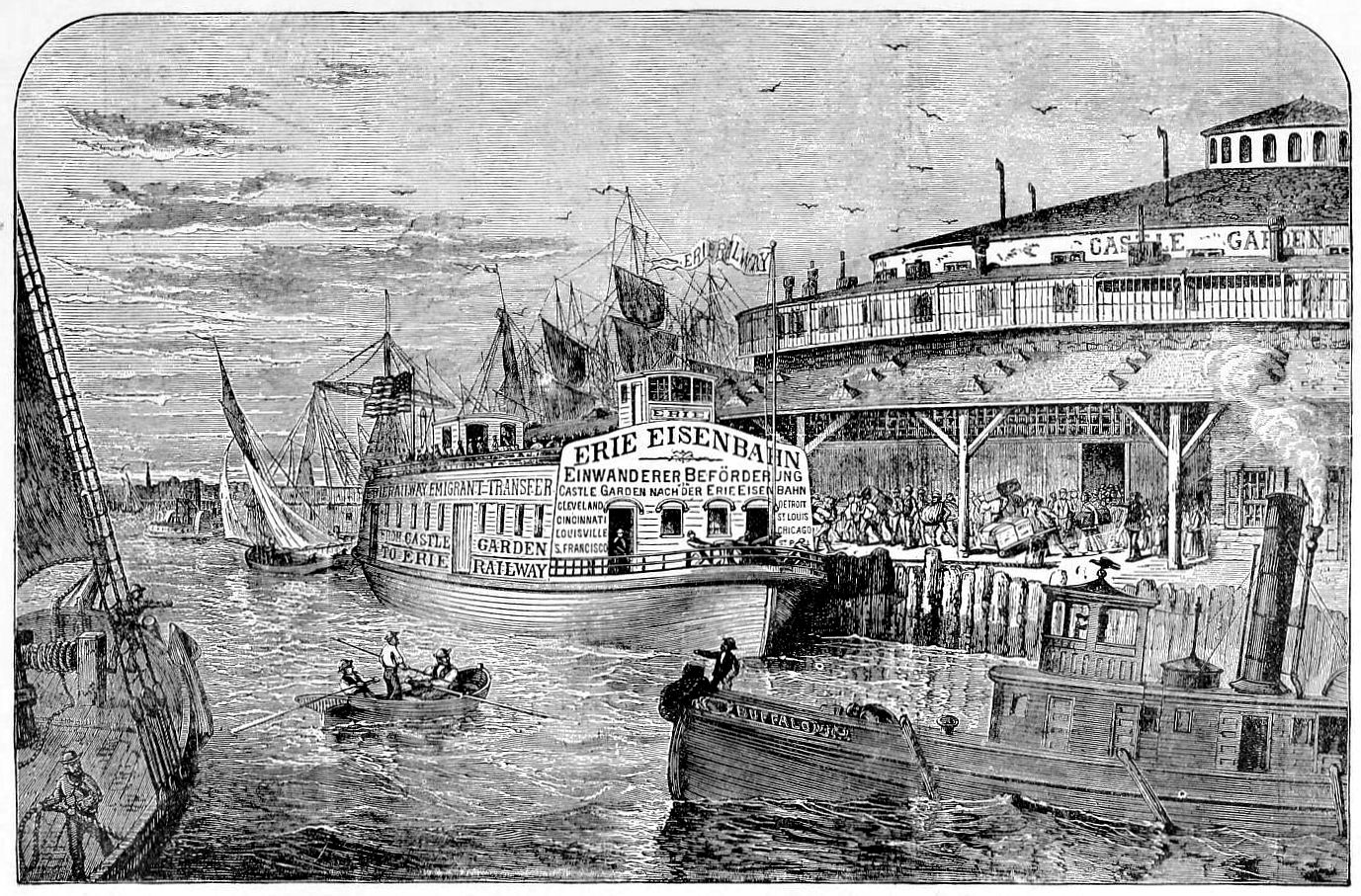
Castle Garden in New York City, where steamboats departed to the Erie Railroad in Piermont.

"A railroad that begins twenty-five miles away from the place it was chartered to bring into communication with some other place,"

the Hon. Francis Granger remarked in opposing an effort of the company to obtain public aid,

does not seem to be warranted in supposing that it is entitled to a confidence in its purposes that it would have if it could show that it would deposit its traffic where it protested it intended to deposit it.

The charter of the Company gave it the privilege of constructing its railroad from New York, or from a point near New York. The uniting of the seaboard with the lakes by a railroad which would attract traffic of the great West to New York was the one idea the projectors of this railroad dwelt upon in seeking the charter. So the fact that the road was to come no nearer the great center of the country's trade than twenty-five miles grew to be a question of much comment.

=== Golden opportunity thrown away ===
April 25, 1831, almost a year to a day before the corporation that became the New York and Erie Railroad Company was chartered, the New York and Harlem Railroad Company was granted letters of incorporation, with authority to construct a single or double track railway:

"...from any point on the north bounds of Twenty-third Street to any point on the Harlem River, between the east bounds of the Third Avenue and the west bounds of Eighth Avenue, with a branch to Hudson River, between 124th Street and the north bounds of 129th Street."

April 6, 1832, the charter was amended to authorize the company, with permission of the authorities of New York City, to extend its railroad "along the Fourth Avenue to Fourteenth Street." May 12, 1836, the company was authorized to unite with any railroad or canal company organized under the laws of New York State, for the purpose of constructing a railroad, at any point which the directors of the two companies might agree upon. Subsequent legislation empowered the company to extend its railroad to the City Hall. May 7, 1840, the company was authorized to extend its railroad from the Harlem River through the County of Westchester to a point of intersection with the proposed New York and Albany Railroad. The company was also authorized to build a drawbridge across the Harlem River.

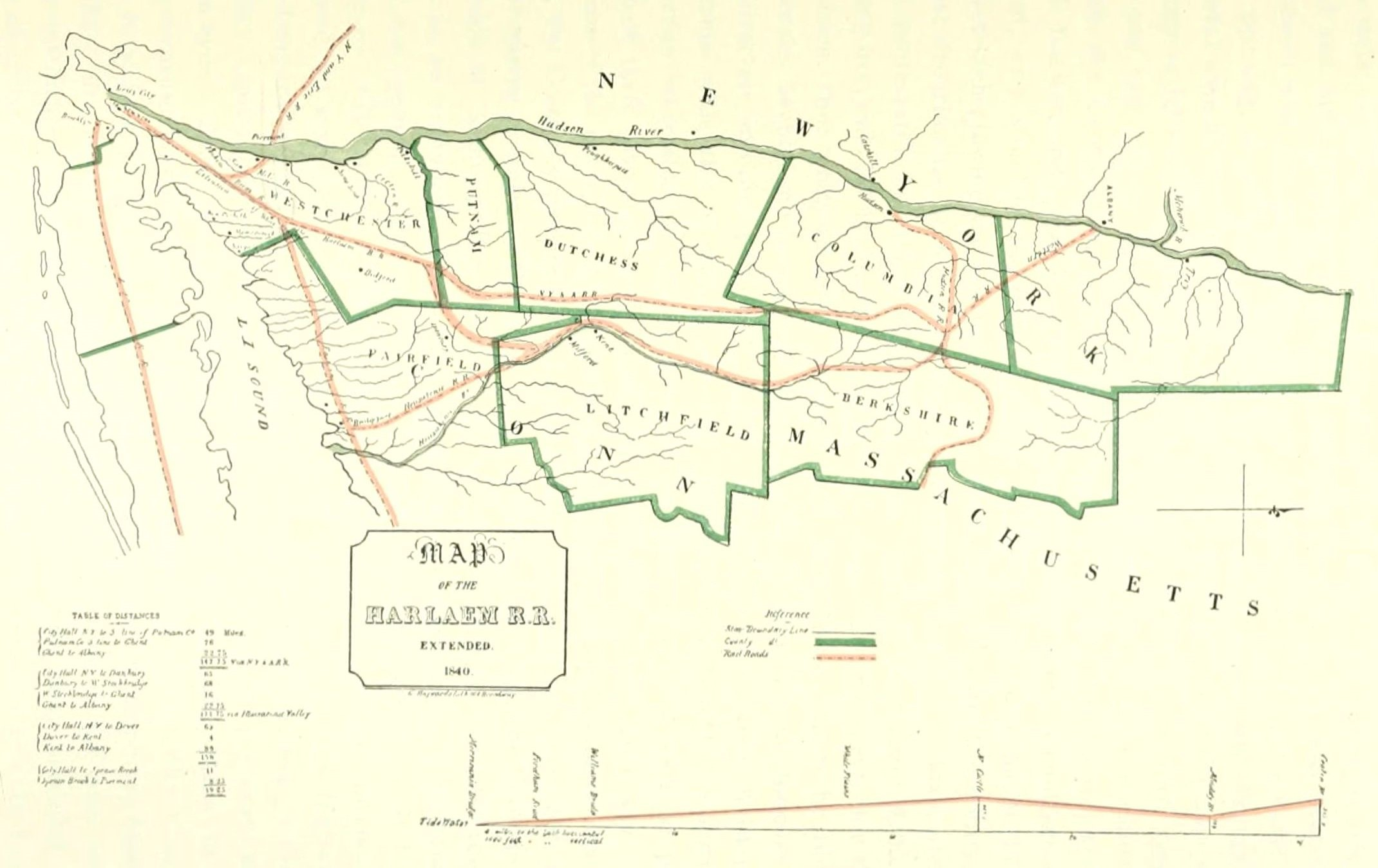
1840 Map of Harlem Railroad with the (failed) plan to connect the Erie Railroad. (see left-top corner)

At the session of the New York Legislature for 1841, the New York and Harlem Railroad Company was a petitioner for the aid of the State to the amount of $350,000, by the issue of State stock at six per cent, interest, payable in five years, to enable the company to continue its work; the railroad being then in operation from the City Hall in New York to Fordham, a distance of thirteen miles. To influence feeling in its favor the company laid particular stress on the fact that by this concession a communication by rail between New York and Albany would be greatly hastened. This petition was presented to the Legislature, January 26, and was referred to the Senate Committee on Railroads. The application was refused.

At this time work on the Erie was at the height of its activity. Eleazar Lord was President of the company. The President of the New York and Harlem Railroad was Samuel R. Brooks. He seems to have been a far-seeing man and a practical one. The New York and Albans - Railroad scheme was languishing, as were most of the railroad enterprises then, and President Brooks, failing to obtain aid from the State for his company, and seeing no immediate future for the New York and Albany Railroad that would benefit him, turned his attention to the Erie, a brief study of the scope of which project convinced him that not only its future greatness, but the salvation and enhancement of his own railroad, lay in a union of the two (as shown in the map).

There is no record to show how his idea was received by the Erie management. Eleazar Lord, in his scathing review of the Erie, published in 1855, makes no reference to the Erie-Harlem incident. The Offer was apparently not accepted, and with that a golden opportunity was thrown Away. This might have been the fatal mistake, that made possible all of Erie's subsequent woes - But for that mistake there would be no Vanderbilt Kingdom, and the History of Wall Street and of Railroads in this Country would have been entirely different. All of the Present Great Terminal possessions of the Vanderbilt System at Forty-second Street in New York City might have been Ernie's by a Nod of the Head and the Outlay of Less than $90,000.

=== Overall Erie Railroad operations ===
Bowen was appointed president at the close of May, 1841, and continued in that office till the annual election in October, 1842. During the first six months of that period, the affairs of the Company continued to be prosperous in all four divisions. The Eastern division, after a considerable delay for the arrival of iron, was opened to the public from Piermont to Goshen, in the month of September. The work under the contracts on the Susquehanna and Western divisions was rapidly advanced. That on the Delaware division was delayed by an injunction obtained by the Delaware and Hudson Canal Company.

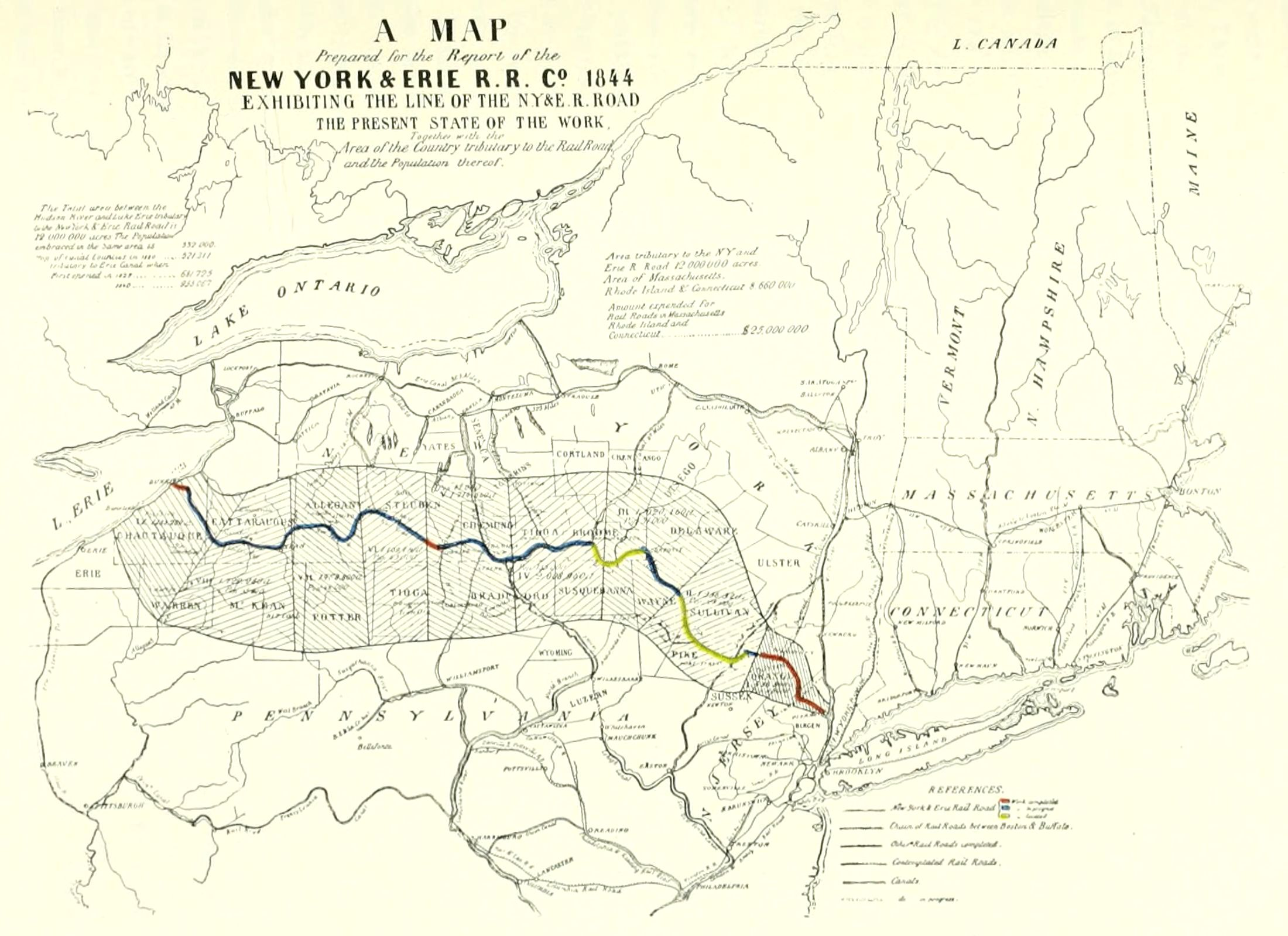
Map of New York & Erie Rail Road, 1844, showing the state of work.

Under the concurrent influence, however, of the political faction who were opposed to State Loans and to all public works, and of a depressed state of commercial affairs, the sale of the State ownership interest became increasingly difficult, and the price receded from ninety-two per cent, in June, to eighty-two, in December. To avoid so heavy a discount, and prevent a further decline by throwing it on the market, a large amount of it was hypothecated as security for temporary loans. At length, in the course of the winter, the price fell below the rates at which hypothecations had been made, and sales became necessary.

The result was a sacrifice of so large a sum (about $300,000) as suddenly to render the Company unable to pay the quarterly interest due on 1 April 1842. Their credit being thus destroyed, and their operations arrested, and there being a variety of claims which were liable to be prosecuted, the Company immediately placed its affairs in the hands of assignees, by whom its interests; were protected, and the Eastern division was kept in successful operation. An effort was made in the Legislature, at the session of 1842, to obtain a release of the State loan and authority to the company to issue bonds; but neither that nor any accommodation in respect to the accruing interest, was agreeable to the politicians at that time.

The liabilities of the company, to the extent of about $600,000, for work and materials West of Goshen, and chiefly on the Susquehanna and Western divisions, were unprovided for; and all operations were suspended, and continued so till 1845. Owing to the disappointment of the Central and Western counties, and the old leaven of outside political influence, a change of directors was desired, by which a large majority of the Board should be taken, not from the city as before, but from the interior counties. This was accordingly effected at the annual election in the autumn, 1843. The former directors, with one or two exceptions, declined a reelection. A new direction was chosen, and Mr. William Maxwell, of Chemung county, was appointed president.

== Publications ==
- New York and Erie Railroad Company, James Bowen (1841) Office of the New-York and Erie Rail-Road Company. New York, 13 September 1841.
- New York and Erie Railroad Company, James Bowen (1842) To the Stockholders of the New York and Erie Railroad Company.

Business positions
Preceded by Eleazer Lord	President of Erie Railroad; 1841–1843	Succeeded by William Maxwell
