= Edwin G. Merrill =

American banker

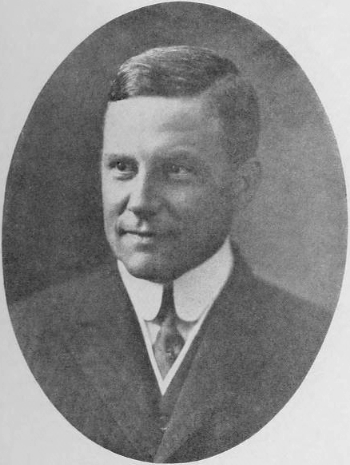

President of the Bank of New York
- In office 1922–1931
- Preceded by: Herbert L. Griggs
- Succeeded by: John C. Traphagen

Personal details
- Born: Edwin Godfrey Merrill; November 21, 1873 Bangor, Maine, US
- Died: January 16, 1950 (aged 76) Manhattan, New York, US
- Spouse: Adelaide Isabel Katte (m. 1902; died 1950)
- Children: 5
- Education: Philips Exeter Academy
- Alma mater: Harvard University
- Occupation: Banker

Edwin Godfrey Merrill (November 21, 1873 – January 16, 1950) was an American banker who served as President of the Bank of New York from 1922 to 1931.

== Early life ==
Merrill was born on November 21, 1873 at Bangor, Maine where his father and grandfather were bankers. He was a son of Isaac Hobbs Merrill (1846–1901) and Ada Frances (née Godfrey) Merrill (1846–1923). Among his surviving siblings were Fullerton Merrill and Ralph Winslow Merrill.

His paternal grandparents were Elias Merrill, who served in the U.S. Civil War, and Emma Augusta (née Hobbs) Merrill (a daughter of Isaac Hobbs). His maternal grandparents were Edwin Dudley Godfrey and Harriet Sophia (née Rice) Godfrey.

After attending Philips Exeter Academy in Exeter, New Hampshire, he attended Harvard University, where he graduated magna cum laude in 1895.

== Career ==
After a year traveling around Europe, he joined his father's firm, Merrill & Co., in Bangor in 1896. Two years later he moved to New York City, briefly working with Kountze Brothers, before joining Estabrook & Co. with whom he was affiliated until 1901 when he returned to Maine to become managing partner of the family firm. In 1903, he organized the Merrill Trust Company and, in 1905, he became president of the Veazie National Bank when it merged with Merrill Trust.

Returning to New York City in 1909, he joined Central Trust Company as a vice president before joining the Union Trust Company as president in 1910. When the two companies merged in 1918, he became vice president and vice chairman of the Central Union Trust Company. In 1920, he became president of the New York Life Insurance and Trust Company. In 1922 when it was consolidated into the Bank of New York, he was made president of the resulting Bank of New York and Trust Company. In 1931, he was elected chairman of the company and was succeeded as president by John C. Traphagen. When it merged with the Fifth Avenue Bank in 1948, he became honorary chairman of the board, serving in that role until his death in 1950.

== Personal life ==
On January 21, 1902 in Irvington-on-Hudson, New York, Merrill was married to Adelaide Isabel Katte (1876–1959), a daughter of British-born civil engineer Walter Katte and Elizabeth (née Britton) Katte. Together, they had a home in New York City and in Bedford Hills, New York, and were the parents of:

- Edwin Katte Merrill (1902–1963), who married Helen Phelps Stokes, the daughter of Isaac Newton Phelps Stokes and Edith Minturn Stokes in 1928. After his death in 1963, she married Donald Fairfax Bush Jr. in 1964.
- Dudley Merrill (1904–1988), who married Katherine Park, a daughter of Charles Francis Park Jr., in 1932.
- Adele Katte Merrill (1909–1983), who married Charlton Francis MacVeagh, a son of Ambassador Charles MacVeagh and brother to Lincoln MacVeagh, in 1929.
- Priscilla Godfrey Merrill (1915–1987), who married Dr. F. Rene Murad in 1936.
- Elizabeth Britton Merrill (1917–1993), who married her cousin, Edwin Britton Katte in 1936.

Merrill died in Manhattan at his home, 943 Lexington Avenue, on January 16, 1950.
