= J. Carter Bacot =

Chairman of the Board of the Bank of New York
- In office 1982–1998
- Preceded by: Elliott Averett
- Succeeded by: Thomas A. Renyi

President of the Bank of New York
- In office 1974–1982
- Preceded by: Elliott Averett
- Succeeded by: Peter Herrick

Personal details
- Born: John Carter Bacot; February 7, 1933
- Died: April 7, 2005 (aged 72) Montclair, New Jersey, U.S.
- Spouse: Shirley Schou
- Children: 2
- Education: Hamilton College; Cornell Law School
- Occupation: Businessman, lawyer

John Carter Bacot (/ˈbeɪkoʊ/; February 7, 1933 – April 7, 2005) was president of The Bank of New York for eight years and he was chairman and CEO for sixteen years. He remained on the Board of Directors until 2003.

== Early life ==
Bacot spent his early years in Utica, New York. After graduating from Hamilton College in 1955 and from Cornell Law School in 1958. He worked briefly for a Utica law firm.

== Career ==
Bacot joined The Bank of New York in 1960. He was named vice chair of the company in 1975 and president in 1979. Following the death of Elliott Averett, was the chairman and chief executive from 1982 until 1998 and remained on the board until 2003.

While Bacot was the chairman, the bank's assets increase from $11.5 billion to $60 billion. Also, the bank's net annual income increased from $58 million to $1.1 billion.

On April 7, 2005, The Bank of New York Company announced that Bacot had died earlier that day from cardiac arrest at his home in Montclair, New Jersey, at age 72. He had a forty-three-year career at The Bank of New York.

== Personal life ==
Bacot died on April 7, 2005, due to cardiac arrest. He is survived by his wife, Shirley Schou; two daughters, Susan Bacot and Betsy Bacot-Aigner; and two grandsons.
