= Charles G. Pease =

American physician and anti-smoking activist

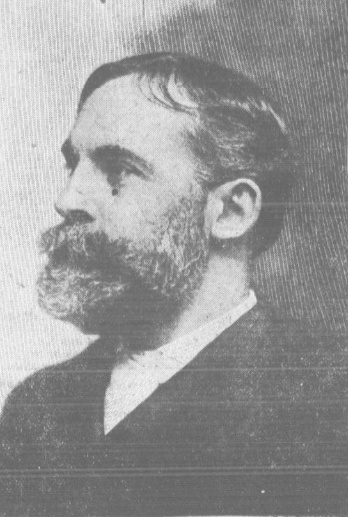
- Born: Charles Giffin Pease; 1854
- Died: 1941 (aged 86–87)
- Occupation: Dentist

Charles Giffin Pease (1854–1941) was an American physician, dentist and anti-smoking activist. He was founder and president of the Non-Smokers Protective League.

== Career ==
Pease practiced dentistry and medicine in New York City. He was best known as an anti-smoking and tobacco activist who was instrumental in bringing about legislation prohibiting smoking in elevated trains and subways. In 1910, he formed the Non-Smoking Protective League to promote legislation against smoking in "public and semi-public places". His anti-tobacco stance was based on ethical and religious principles. In 1911, he argued that unhealthful smoking odors and fumes violated constitutional rights.

Pease was a teetotaller and vegetarian. He campaigned against capital punishment, corsets, vaccination, meat, coffee, cocoa and sugary drinks and tea. On his 85th birthday he spoke out against the killing of animals for meat, commenting that "the dear chickens, how they scream and struggle in their effort to break away from the hands of the assassin. If it were right to kill chickens there would be no expression of fear on the part of the chicken". Pease was associated with the New York Vegetarian Society and was honorary guest at their thanksgiving dinner in 1940.

Pease and his wife resided at an apartment designed by Charles Buek on 72nd Street and Columbus Avenue. He also owned Sunset Lodge at Mamakating Park, New York.

== Christian Science ==
Pease was a former Christian Scientist. He resigned his membership from the First Church of Christ, Scientist stating that Christian Science was a "fabric of deceit, falsehood and dishonesty" and a "grave danger to the community". In 1905, he authored a book denouncing Christian Science as fraudulent and challenged its claims of healing.

== Selected publications ==
- Hints and Suggestions as Aids in the Care and Preservation of the Teeth. New York: Boericke, Runyon & Ernesty. 1895.
- Expose of Christian Science. New York: Restoration Publishing Company. 1905.
- The Smoking Rector. New York: Restoration Publishing Company. 1936.
