= Cornelius Heyer =

American banker and merchant (1773-1843)

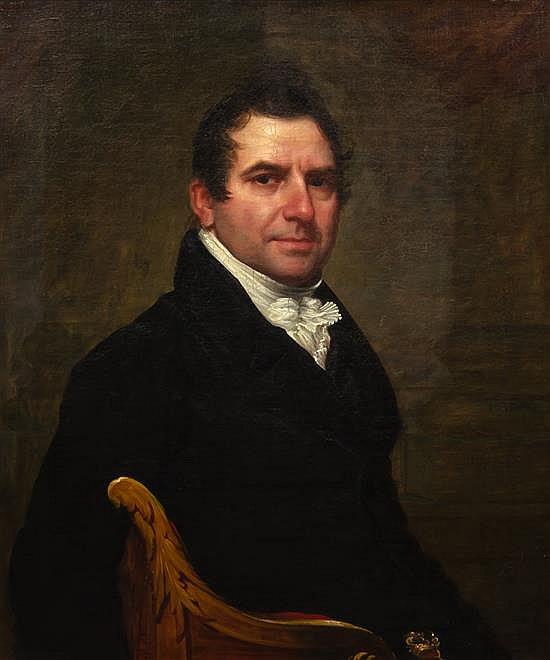
- Portrait of Heyer, by Samuel Lovett Waldo

President of the Bank of New York
- In office November 15, 1832 – January 5, 1843
- Preceded by: Charles Wilkes
- Succeeded by: John Oothout

Personal details
- Born: 1773 New York City, Province of New York, British America
- Died: January 5, 1843 (aged 69–70) New York City, New York, USA
- Spouse: Jane Kip (m. 1796; died 1843)
- Relations: Isaac Stoutenburgh (uncle)
- Children: 12
- Parent(s): William Heyer; Neeltje Stoutenburgh

Cornelius Heyer (1773 – January 5, 1843) was an American merchant and banker.

== Early life ==
He was a son of iron monger Col. William Heyer (1723–1800) and Neeltje (née Stoutenburgh) Heyer (1734–1801). Among his siblings was Isaac Heyer, the treasurer of Rutgers College, who married Jane Hendrick Suydam, and was a merchant with Suydam & Heyer.

His paternal grandparents were Walter Heyer and Jannetje Van Vorst. His maternal grandparents were Isaac Stoutenburgh and Anneke Dally. His maternal uncle was Col. Isaac Stoutenburgh, who fought in the Revolutionary War, and was a member of the New York Provincial Congress and the New York State Senate.

== Career ==
For many years, Heyer and his brother-in-law, Richard Duryée, were partners of a hardware store at 47 and 48 Walter Street, under the firm of Duryee & Heyer.

On May 12, 1825, he was elected Cashier of the Bank of New York. He served in that capacity until shortly after the resignation of Charles Wilkes, when he himself was elected President of the Bank of New York on November 15, 1832, a position he held until his death in 1843. He was also elected a director of the bank in 1832 (his brother Isaac had been a director since 1815).

He was elected a member of the Saint Nicholas Society of the City of New York on February 28, 1835.

== Personal life ==
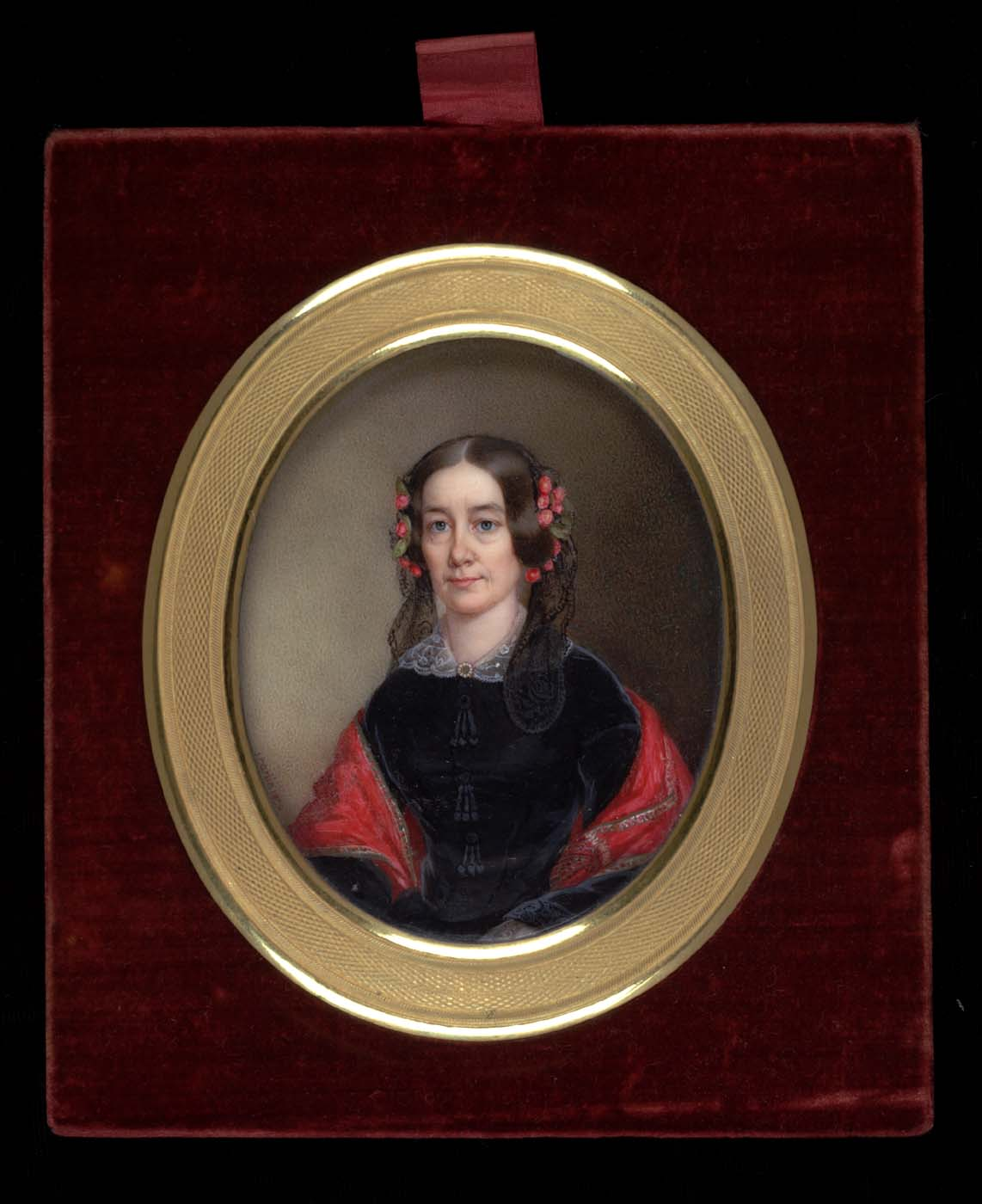
Portrait of his daughter, Mrs. James Suydam (née Charlotte Heyer), by John Carlin, 1859

On April 16, 1796, Heyer was married to Jane Kip (1775–1846), the only child of Anna (née Wentworth) Kip and Capt. Petrus Jacobus Kip, a sea captain whose ship and crew were lost at sea. Together, they were the parents of:

- William Henry Heyer (1797–1828), who died unmarried.
- Jane Eliza Heyer (1799–1877), who married Cornelius Rapalje Suydam, a son of James Suydam and Adrianna Rappelyea.
- Edward Peter Heyer (1800–1863), who married Louisa Harriet Fish, a daughter of Whitehead Fish, in 1822.
- Charlotte Emillia Heyer (1802–1888), who married James Suydam Jr., a son of James Suydam and Adrianna Rappelyea, in 1823.
- Henry Augustus Heyer (1804–1843), who died unmarried.
- Cornelius Heyer (1805–1853), who died unmarried.
- Anna Heyer (1807–1850), who married Edward S. Clark, a native of Albany, in 1831.
- Charles Heyer (1809–1846), who died unmarried.
- Ellen Heyer (1810–1881), who died unmarried.
- Mary Heyer (1812–1864), who married Asa Deming van Schaack, a son of Clarissa Deming and Cornelius Cruger van Schaack, in 1836.

Heyer died on January 5, 1843 and was interred at New York City Marble Cemetery.

=== Descendants ===
Through his son Edward, he was a grandfather of Whitehead Fish Heyer (1827–1874), who married Sarah Louise Tunis (a daughter of Caleb Camp Tunis and Rhoda (née Sands) Tunis.
