= Harriet Maxwell Converse =

American author of Scottish and Irish heritage

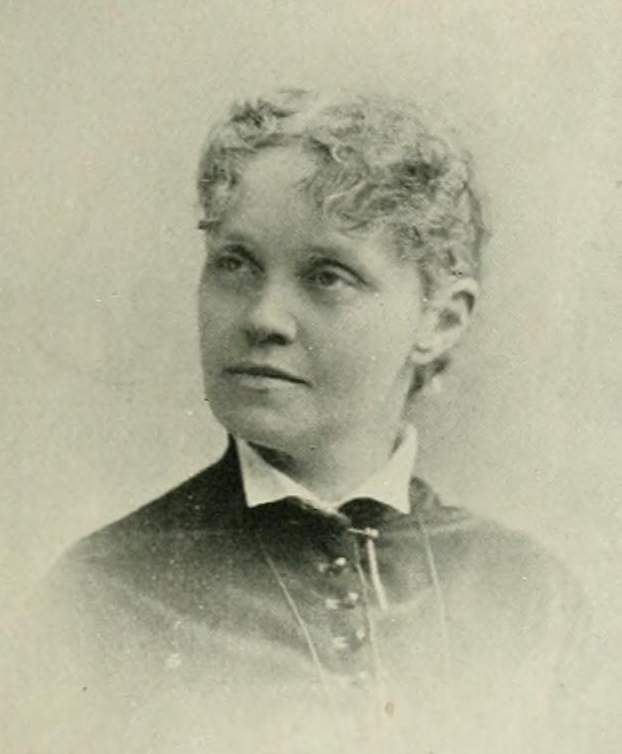
- Born: Harriet Arnot Maxwell; January 11, 1836; Elmira, New York
- Died: November 18, 1903 (aged 67)
- Writing career
- Genres: Folklore, poetry
- Notable work: Sheaves

Harriet Maxwell Converse (née, Harriet Arnot Maxwell; Seneca: Ya-ie-wa-noh, lit. 'she watches over us' or Gayaneshaoh;) (11 January 1836 - 18 November 1903) was an American author of Scottish and Irish heritage. She was a folklorist, poet, and historian of the Haudenosaunee; by the late 19th century, they were a loose confederacy of six nations in New York State and Canada.

She became an advocate for the rights of the Seneca and other Haudenosaunee peoples in New York state, helping them retain their lands and preserve their culture. In recognition of her contributions, the Seneca made her a member of the nation and gave her an honorary position as a Sachem or chief of the Six Nations.

With an appropriation in 1897 from the New York State Museum, Converse made extensive purchases of Haudenosaunee artifacts from private collectors and tribes to have them preserved by the state. She also donated a family collection that was a century old. She persuaded the Onondaga to transfer their collection of historic wampum belts of the Five Nations to the state museum for preservation.

== Early years ==
Harriet Arnot Maxwell was born in Elmira, New York, in 1836, daughter of Thomas Maxwell and Maria (Purdy) Maxwell. Her father had a concern for Native Americans in New York State and was active in politics; he was elected and served in office at the county, state and federal level, being elected as a Congressman. He later became vice-president of the Erie Railroad. Her mother was a woman of culture and education. Her paternal grandfather, Guy Maxwell, had been an Indian trader in Virginia and New York, moving to Elmira in the late 18th century after the United States achieved independence. Both men had been adopted by the Seneca to honor them. Her mother Maria died when Harriet was nine, and her father sent the girl to live with relatives in Milan, Ohio. There she attended public school.

== Career ==
Converse entered a larger public life after her second marriage. After she and her husband traveled, in the late 1860s they happened to meet Ely S. Parker in New York City. He was a Seneca who had become an engineer and served with General Ulysses S. Grant in the American Civil War. A Hoyaneh of the Seneca, Parker was highly influential in the Seneca Nation and in New York politics.

Harriet Converse became increasingly involved in learning about the Seneca, with Parker's help. She became inspired to defend the rights of the Haudenosaunee by aiding them politically with her wealth and support, and helped to preserve their culture.

In 1885 Converse was formally adopted by the Seneca Snipe Clan.

In 1883 she published her first volume of poems, Sheaves (New York City, 1883), which passed through several editions. She also wrote an ode The Ho-de-no-sau-nee: The Confederacy of the Iroquois (1884).

Converse was a productive writer of non-fiction, contributing to several magazines and newspapers. Among her works are the historical volumes, The Religious Festivals of the Iroquois Indians and Mythology and Folk Lore of the North American Indians. These have been criticized as being sentimental accounts.

In 1891 Converse was a member of a delegation to Albany, New York to oppose the Whipple Bill before the New York State Assembly; it was designed to force the distribution of communal land in allotments to individual heads of households, along the lines of the federal Dawes Act to extinguish Indian land claims. It was an action designed to assimilate the Haudenosaunee to subsistence farming in the European-American model and force a break-up of their reservations in the state. She helped achieve its defeat in committee. Converse had been invited by the Haudenosaunee to sit in their Six-Nation Council held in Albany. No white woman except Mary Jemison, who had been adopted and assimilated by the Seneca as a young woman after being taken captive in a raid, had ever been honored in this way.

After the bill was defeated, the Seneca National Council convened at Carrollton, in the Allegany Reservation. During this 1891 session, members moved to make Converse an official member of the Seneca Nation as an honor, naming her Ya-ie-wa-noh, after the wife of their notable chief Cornplanter. The motion was passed by the council. In 1892 the Onondaga Nation "raised her up" to the position of sachem, to take the place of one who had died, and she was considered an honorary chief of the Six Nations.

Among her most important work was Converse's purchases and donations to preserve Haudenosaunee artifacts; many are held today by the New York State Museum in Albany and the American Museum of Natural History in New York City. In 1897 she was given an appropriation to buy from private collectors and tribes; she also donated her family's collection, which had items that were a century old. She also persuaded the Onondaga to have the NY State Museum made the repository for their historic collection of wampum belts of the Five Nations.

In 1902 Converse publicized her opposition to a federal bill in both New York City and Washington, DC, and helped achieve its defeat. It would have required the Seneca to pay a crushing $200,000 to settle a claim by the Ogden Land Company, over an early 19th-century transaction.

== Personal life ==
Harriet Maxwell married George B. Clarke in Ohio, who was a part owner of the Congress Spring in Saratoga Springs, New York. He died relatively young. Inheriting his estate as well as from her father in 1864, who was vice-president of the Erie Railroad before his death, left her independently wealthy. In 1861 the widow Clarke had married again, to Franklin Buchanan Converse, whom she knew from childhood. He was a musician, inventor and writer. She had no children from either marriage. The couple traveled extensively for several years.
