= Charles M. Fry =

American banker (1822–1892)

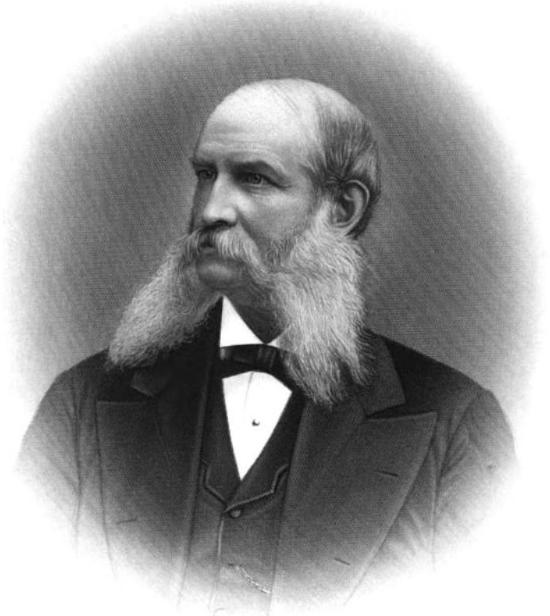

President of the Bank of New York
- In office 1876–1892
- Preceded by: Charles P. Leverich
- Succeeded by: Ebenezer S. Mason

Personal details
- Born: Charles Meriwether Fry; April 24, 1822 Madison County, Virginia
- Died: November 18, 1892 (aged 70) Manhattan, New York
- Spouse: Elizabeth Wickham Leigh (died 1892)
- Parent(s): Henry Belville Fry; Annie Clarke

Charles Meriwether Fry (April 24, 1822 – November 18, 1892) was an American banker.

== Early life ==
Fry was born in Madison County, Virginia, on April 24, 1822. He was the eldest son of Henry Belville Fry (1794–1836) and Annie (née Clarke) Fry. Among his siblings were Kitty Fry (who married W. D. Fry of Madison), Maria Elizabeth Fry (who married William Thomas Sparks). After his mother's death, his father married Lucy Clarke, and had three more daughters, Sarah A. Fry (who married R. S. Thomas, Clerk of Madison County), Mary E. Fry (who married Jerry Garnett), and Clara H. Fry (who married Absalom G. Garnett).

His paternal grandparents were Catherine "Kitty" (née Walker) Fry (a daughter of Thomas Walker of Castle Hill) and Joshua Fry (a son of the Rev. Henry Fry and grandson of Col. Joshua Fry, an adventurer and cartographer who collaborated with Thomas Jefferson's father, Peter Jefferson). His great-aunt, Clary Stubbs (née Walker) Hawes, was the mother of Richard Hawes, 2nd Confederate Governor of Kentucky and U.S. representative Albert Gallatin Hawes.

== Career ==
Fry moved to New York City in 1848. He was elected a director of the Bank of New York in 1874, the same year he was made vice-president of the bank. On January 18, 1876, he was elected to succeed Charles P. Leverich as President of the Bank of New York. In 1888, he wrote a letter to the editor of The New York Times, claiming that the Bank "does not hold one dollar of C. G. Francklyn's paper nor has it ever lost a dollar by Mr. Francklyn." He served in that capacity until his death in 1892 when he was succeeded by Ebenezer S. Mason.

== Personal life ==
Fry was married to Elizabeth Wickham Leigh (1824–1895), a daughter of U.S. senator Benjamin W. Leigh and, his third wife, Julia Wickham (a daughter of John Wickham). Her elder half-brother, William B. Leigh, married Mary White Colston (a daughter of U.S. representative Edward Colston). Through William, she was an aunt of artist William Robinson Leigh. (Note: Elizabeth's nephew, William Robinson Leigh, married Ethel Traphagen, the founder of the Traphagen School of Fashion in New York City. She was a daughter of New York State Senator William C. Traphagen and sister of John C. Traphagen, who was president of the Bank of New York from 1931 to 1948.)

He died at 279 Lexington Avenue, his home in Manhattan (a four-story brownstone designed by Charles Buek at a cost of $50,500), on November 18, 1892. He was buried at Shockoe Hill Cemetery in Richmond, Virginia.
