= Guy Maxwell =

Irish-American pioneer (1770–1814)

Guy Maxwell (Seneca adopted name, Ta-ce-wa.ya.se; 15 July 1770, Ireland - 23 Feb 1814) was an Irish-born American pioneer. He was the first Internal Revenue Officer of the Elmira, New York region. He served as sheriff of Tioga County, Pennsylvania. He was the father and founder of the Maxwell family.

== Early life ==
Guy Maxwell's father, Alexander Maxwell, and his mother, Jane McBrantuey, belonging to the Clan McPherson, left Glasgow, Scotland, in 1770, to come to this country. The ship was driven on the coast of Ireland by a storm. There, in the County Down, Guy Maxwell was born. Two years passed before the Maxwells at last reached America. They settled near Martinsburg, New York.

== Career ==
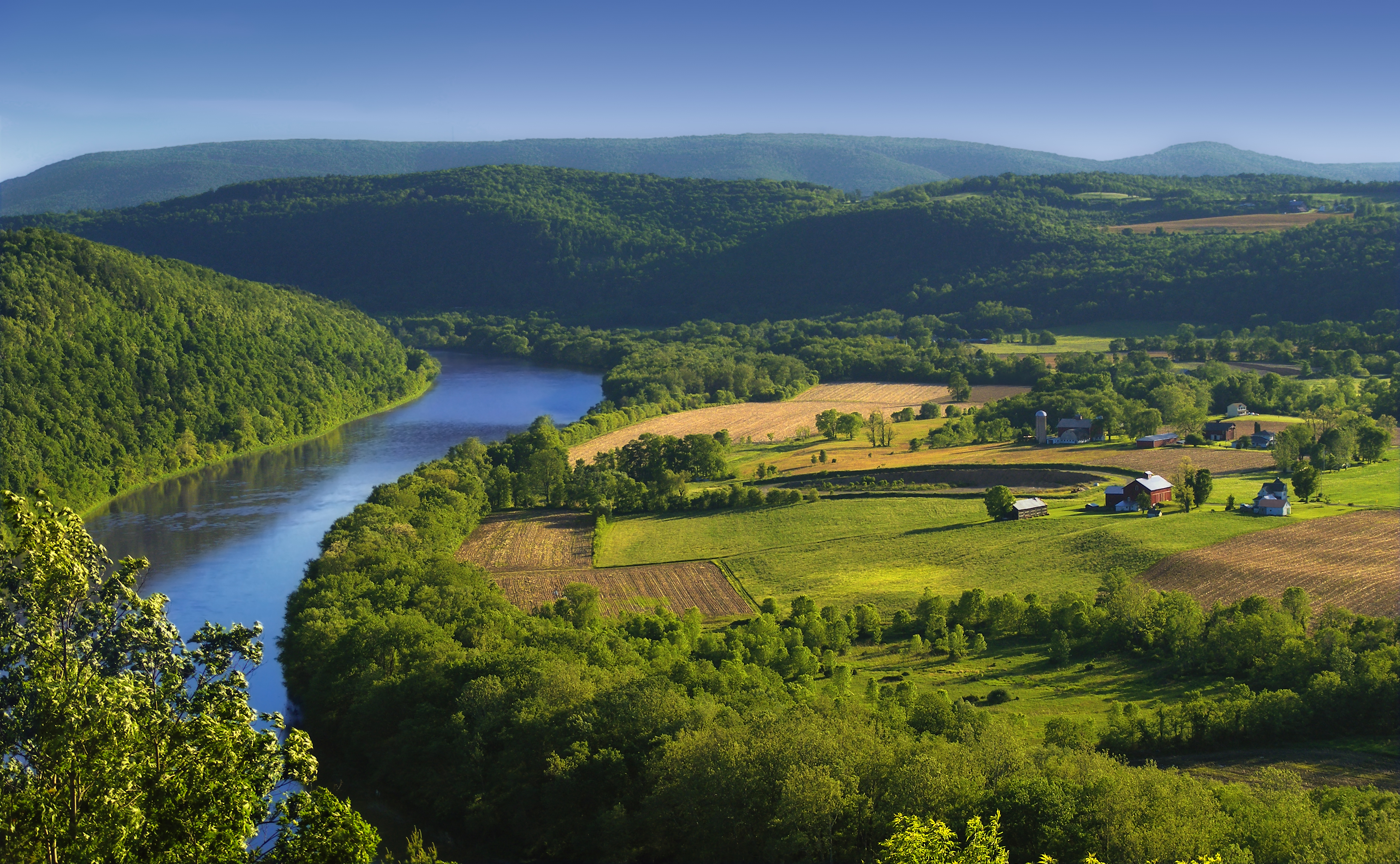
Susquehanna River in Bradford County, Pennsylvania.

Some years earlier, Matthias Hollenback had left Martinsburg for the Susquehanna Valley, settling at Wilkes-Barre, Pennsylvania. He was a banker, a farmer, a merchant, and a fighter who later became colonel in the American Revolutionary War. He became the biggest man of his time in Northern Pennsylvania and Southern New York. His operations extended up the Susquehanna and Chemung rivers, and at every "point" or trading post, all along the valley, he had a store. He opened up the country with his push and his accumulated capital. His was regarded as a heroic figure of that time and locality.

When Maxwell was about 18 years of age, Colonel Hollenback was in Martinsburg and they met. Hollenback was so pleased with Maxwell that he invited the young man to return with him to what is now Elmira, to take charge of the Hollenback enterprise there. Maxwell seized the opportunity, and went. It was the making of him and of the locality to which he emigrated. Two years later, he returned to Martinsburg and married a relative of Colonel Hollenback, taking her with him to Elmira. His family included sons William Maxwell and Thomas Maxwell, as well as Harriet Maxwell Converse, daughter of Thomas.

Maxwell acted as clerk for Timothy Pickering at Tioga Point, Pennsylvania, and transcribed a treaty for him. He had been at Tioga Point for several years and served as clerk in Hollenback's trading post. In connection with treaties of this region should be mentioned the adoption by the Iroquois of Maxwell and his descendants. Maxwell acted as secretary to Pickering at the Tioga Point council, and at Newtown Point (now Elmira). The Iroquois, especially Red Jacket, looked upon Maxwell with favor, and in 1792, he was formally adopted by the Senecas, and given a Seneca name, "Ta-ce-wa.ya.se", meaning "the honest trader".

Maxwell became the first Internal Revenue Officer of that region. He was also sheriff of Tioga County, Pennsylvania. He achieved local distinction in many other ways. In the War of 1812, the embargo brought disaster to many of his undertakings.

== Death ==
Maxwell died less than 44 years of age, in 1814.
