= William Leigh (judge) =

American judge

Judge William Leigh
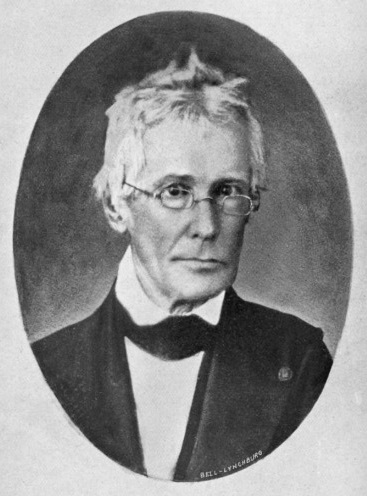

Court of Appeals of Virginia
- Appointed by: Virginia General Assembly

Personal details
- Born: May 1783
- Died: July 19, 1871
- Education: College of William and Mary
- Occupation: Justice

William Leigh (1783–1871) was a Virginia jurist, serving on the Halifax County Court, and later the General Court and finally the Circuit Court of Law and Chancery.

== Early and family life ==
Born in May 1783 in Chesterfield County, Virginia, to Rev. William Leigh (1748–1787) and Elizabeth Watkins Leigh (d. 1799, daughter of Benjamin Watkins, first clerk of the Chesterfield Court), Leigh was educated by his uncle Thomas Watkins (who succeeded at the Chesterfield County Clerk) and at the school of Rev. Needlar Robinson, before being sent to Petersburg, Virginia where he apprenticed with merchant Mr. Bell. His elder brother Benjamin Watkins Leigh had become an attorney practicing in Petersburg, so Leigh went to Williamsburg, Virginia for formal education, but was only able to afford one year at the College of William and Mary (in 1804) so he returned to Chesterfield County to assist his uncle and read law.

Leigh married Rebecca Selden Watkins (1786–1852) on December 15, 1807, and they had seven children. They moved to Halifax County, Virginia where Leigh built an estate, Leighwood.

== Career ==
Admitted to the bar in 1805, Leigh practiced law and served as a judge for the Halifax County Court. He represented Halifax, Charlotte, and Prince Edward Counties in the Virginia Constitutional Convention of 1829-1830. After voters adopted the new constitution, the General Assembly appointed Leigh a judge of the Virginia General Court (in 1831), and he continued in that post until the General Court was abolished in 1851. He was then appointed to the Circuit Superior Court of Law and Chancery and held that position until he retired.

He is also known as one of three executors of the will of U.S. Senator John Randolph of Roanoke, along with Bishop William Meade. Randolph's will freed his slaves, and was subject to decades of legal challenges before the executors finally bought land in Ohio, where the freed slaves, after some additional difficulties, were able to settle.

== Death and legacy ==
Leigh died at "Leighwood" in Halifax County July 19, 1871, and was buried at St. John's Episcopal Church in Halifax County. Some of his papers were acquired by the Library of Virginia in 1923.
