= William Maxwell (railroad executive) =

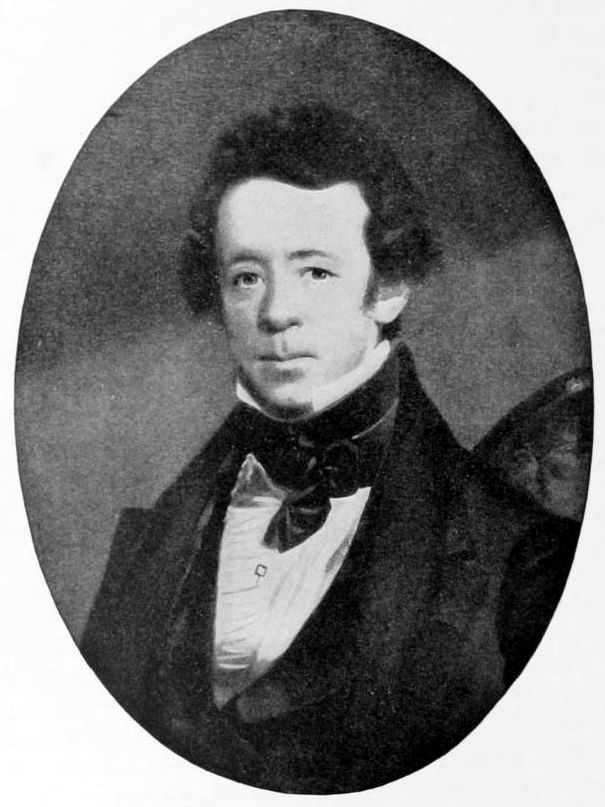
- Born: February 11, 1794; Athens, Pennsylvania
- Died: November 22, 1856 (aged 62); Elmira, New York
- Occupation: Railroad executive

William Maxwell (February 11, 1794 – November 22, 1856) was an American business executive and politician, president of Erie Railroad from 1842 to 1843.

== Biography ==
=== Early years and education ===
Guy Maxwell was the father and founder of the Maxwell family. He managed banks, dug canals, and was adopted as a chief into a tribe of the Seneca Indians.

William Maxwell, Guy Maxwell's third son, was born at Tioga Point, now Athens, Pennsylvania, February 11, 1794. His parents moved that year to Newtown Point, now Elmira. He was educated in local schools, and studied law in the office of Fletcher Mathews, a distinguished member of the bar at that time.

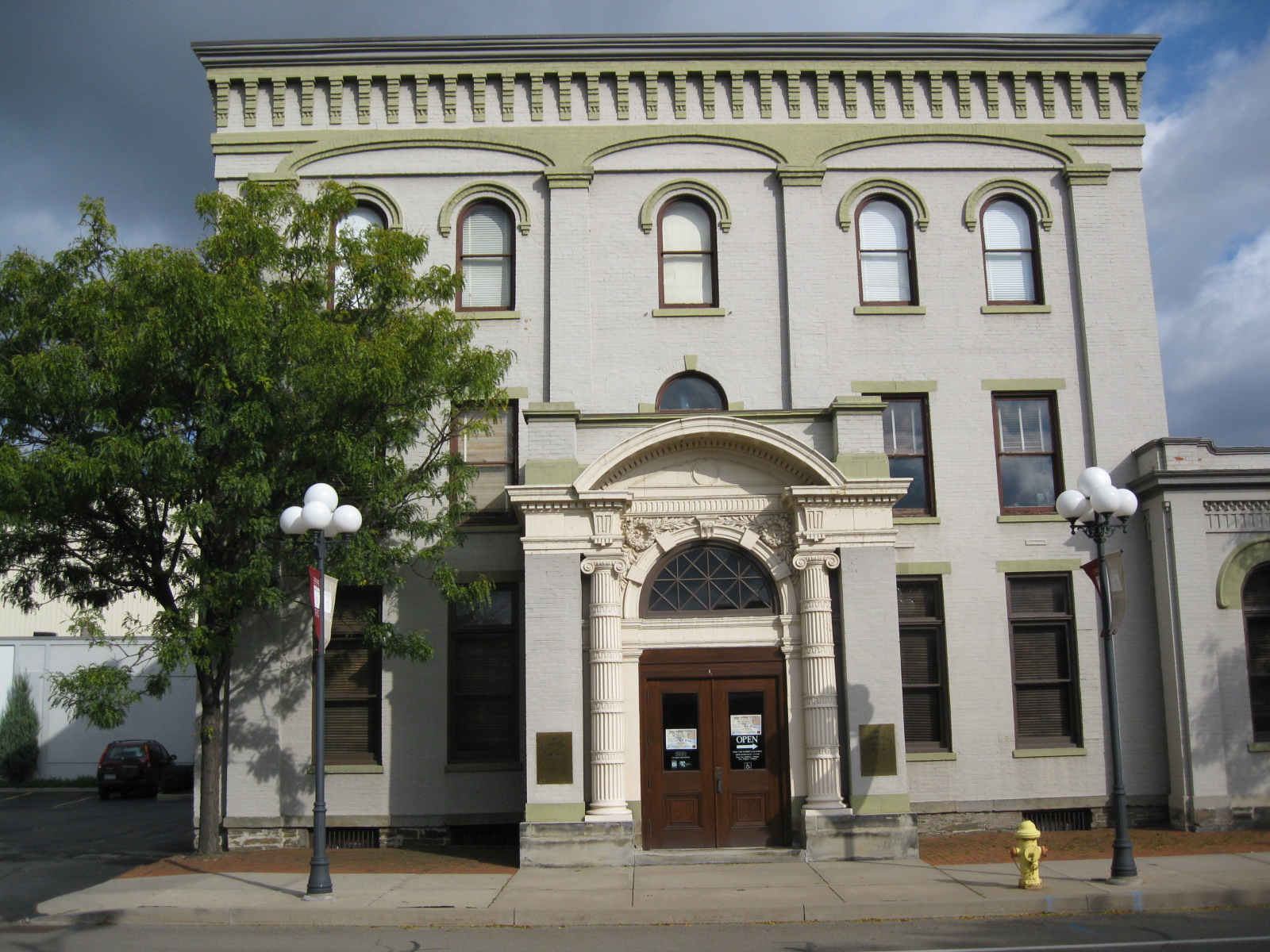
Chemung Canal Bank Building, chartered in July 1833.

=== District Attorney of Tioga County ===
In 1822 he was the District Attorney of Tioga County, of which Chemung County was then a part; in 1829 he was the surrogate of the county, and was a member of the Assembly in 1828 and in 1847. He was a delegate from the county to the State Constitutional Convention of 1846. He was always prominent in the public affairs of the town and county, and was connected with the formation of the Chemung Canal Bank, one of the earliest enterprises of the kind in the Southern Tier.

At one time most of the land in the Third and Seventh Wards of the city of Elmira, and reaching beyond for two or three miles toward Horseheads, stood in his name. He was a power in the Democratic party in those times in that region, and what he said became the order of things. It was largely through his push and influence that the Chemung Canal was constructed, and his enterprise and money helped on most of the railroad enterprises in Elmira.

=== New York and Erie Railroad ===
He early became interested in the project of the New York and Erie Railroad, and was an influential delegate to several of the conventions held to adopt measures looking to the furthering of the prospects of that undertaking.

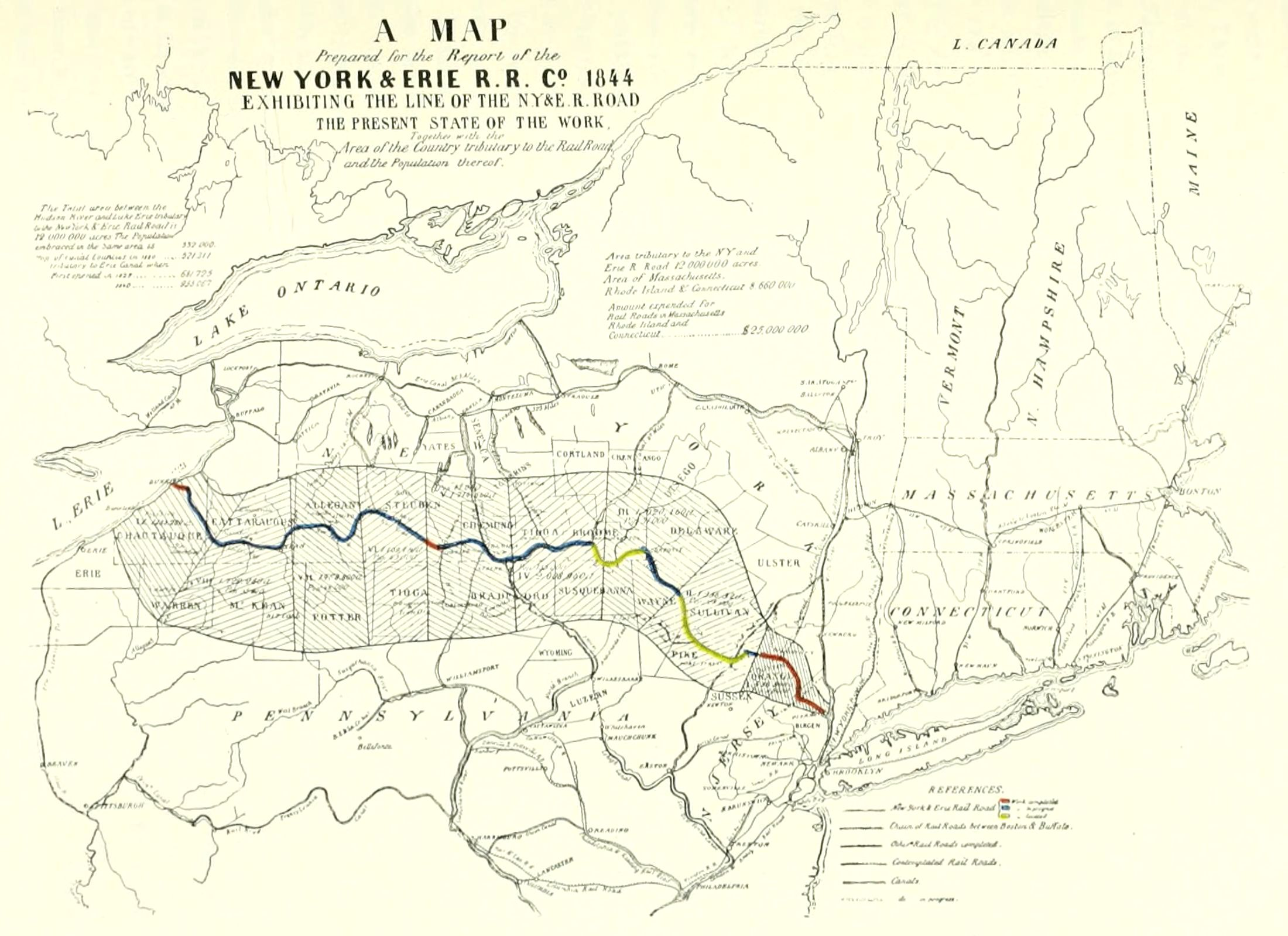
Map of New York & Erie Rail Road constructions, 1844

It was the part he took at a convention held at Owego in the spring of 1842 that brought him into the prominence in Erie affairs that resulted in his being made president in the fall of that year.

=== Family ===
He married Zerwiah Baldwin, September 15, 1814, a daughter of William and Azubah Baldwin, pioneers of the Chemung Valley. One son was born to Mr. Maxwell, but died in infancy. They adopted as their daughter a niece of Mrs. Maxwell, Azubah McQuhae. Mr. Maxwell died at Maxwell Park, Elmira, November 22, 1856. An old-timer at Elmira pays this tribute to William Maxwell:

I remember him ever since I can remember anything. He lived in one of the most beautiful spots in the valley, a big brick house, with a great lawn, and lots of trees, that must have belonged to the original forest there. He was very fond of children, and I have played for hours in and about his house. He was fitted by intellect and education to fill any position in the country, from President down.

Business positions
Preceded by James Bowen	President of Erie Railroad; 1842–1843	Succeeded by Horatio Allen
