= Thomas Maxwell =

American politician

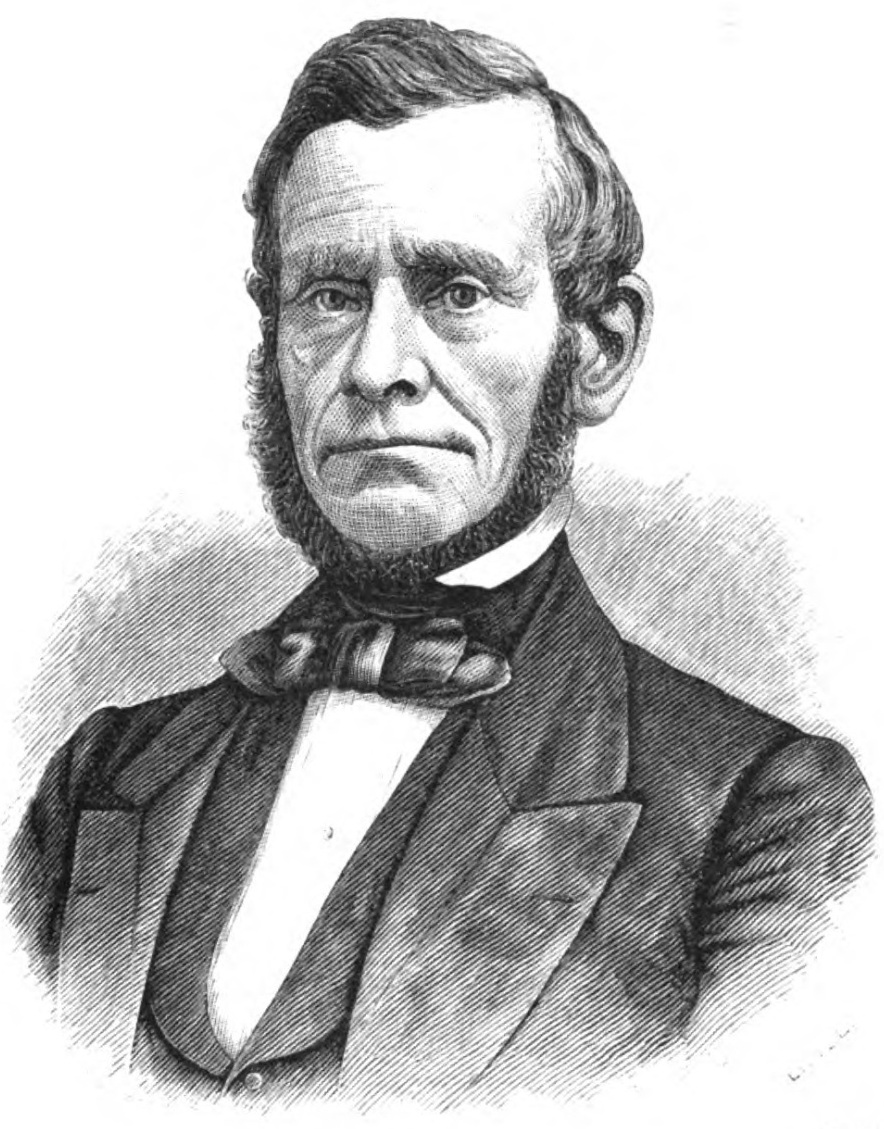

Member of the U.S. House of Representatives from New York's 25th district
- In office March 4, 1829 – March 3, 1831
- Preceded by: David Woodcock
- Succeeded by: Gamaliel H. Barstow

Personal details
- Born: February 16, 1792 Tioga Point, Bradford County, Pennsylvania, U.S.
- Died: November 4, 1864 (aged 72) Elmira, New York, U.S.
- Resting place: Woodlawn Cemetery
- Party: Jacksonian
- Parent: Guy Maxwell (father)

Thomas Maxwell (February 16, 1792 – November 4, 1864) was an attorney and politician, serving for one term from 1829 to 1831 as a U.S. representative from New York, as well as in county and state offices.

== Early life and education ==
Thomas Maxwell was born on February 16, 1792, at Tioga Point (now Athens), Bradford County, Pennsylvania. His father, Guy Maxwell, was an Indian trader and was adopted by the Seneca (Iroquois) in the same year. The senior Maxwell moved his family to Elmira (then Newtown Point), New York, in 1796. In 1804, he was adopted by the Seneca people, given the name He-je-no, meaning "the brave boy".

=== War of 1812 ===
During the War of 1812, Guy Maxwell was appointed quartermaster of a regiment of Cavalry attached to the brigade of General Vincent Mathews.

After the war he served as clerk of Tioga County, New York from 1819 to 1829.

=== Congress ===
Maxwell was elected as a Jacksonian to the Twenty-first Congress (March 4, 1829 – March 3, 1831). He served as chairman of the Committee on Accounts (Twenty-first Congress).

=== Later career ===
He engaged in the prosecution of pension claims.

He studied law and was admitted to practice in the court of common pleas of old Tioga County in 1832. He was editor of the Elmira Gazette from 1834 to 1836, and was appointed as US postmaster of Elmira, serving 1834–1839. Deputy clerk of Chemung County in 1836. Treasurer of Chemung County in 1836–1843. He was chosen as a vice president of the New York and Erie Railroad Co. in 1841. He served as commissioner of loans of United States deposit and of State funds in 1843.

About 1845 Maxwell moved his family to Geneva, New York, upon his appointment as deputy clerk of the State supreme court.

Later in life, Maxwell became an Iroquois agent, and made many notes on them, which were in his daughter's hands. Red Jacket had his portrait painted for Maxwell; they were warm friends. Eighty years after the formal adoption of Maxwell, his daughter Harriet (later known as Harriet Maxwell Converse) was formally adopted by the family of Red Jacket. She was given many mementos, such as a necklace made of 79 little silver brooches, which had been worn by Red Jacket; and also his Masonic pin.

=== Death ===
Maxwell died in Elmira on November 4, 1864, and was interred in Woodlawn Cemetery in Elmira.

U.S. House of Representatives
Preceded by David Woodcock	Member of the U.S. House of Representatives from New York's 25th congressional district 1829–1831	Succeeded by Gamaliel H. Barstow
