= Charles P. Leverich =

American banker (1809–1876)

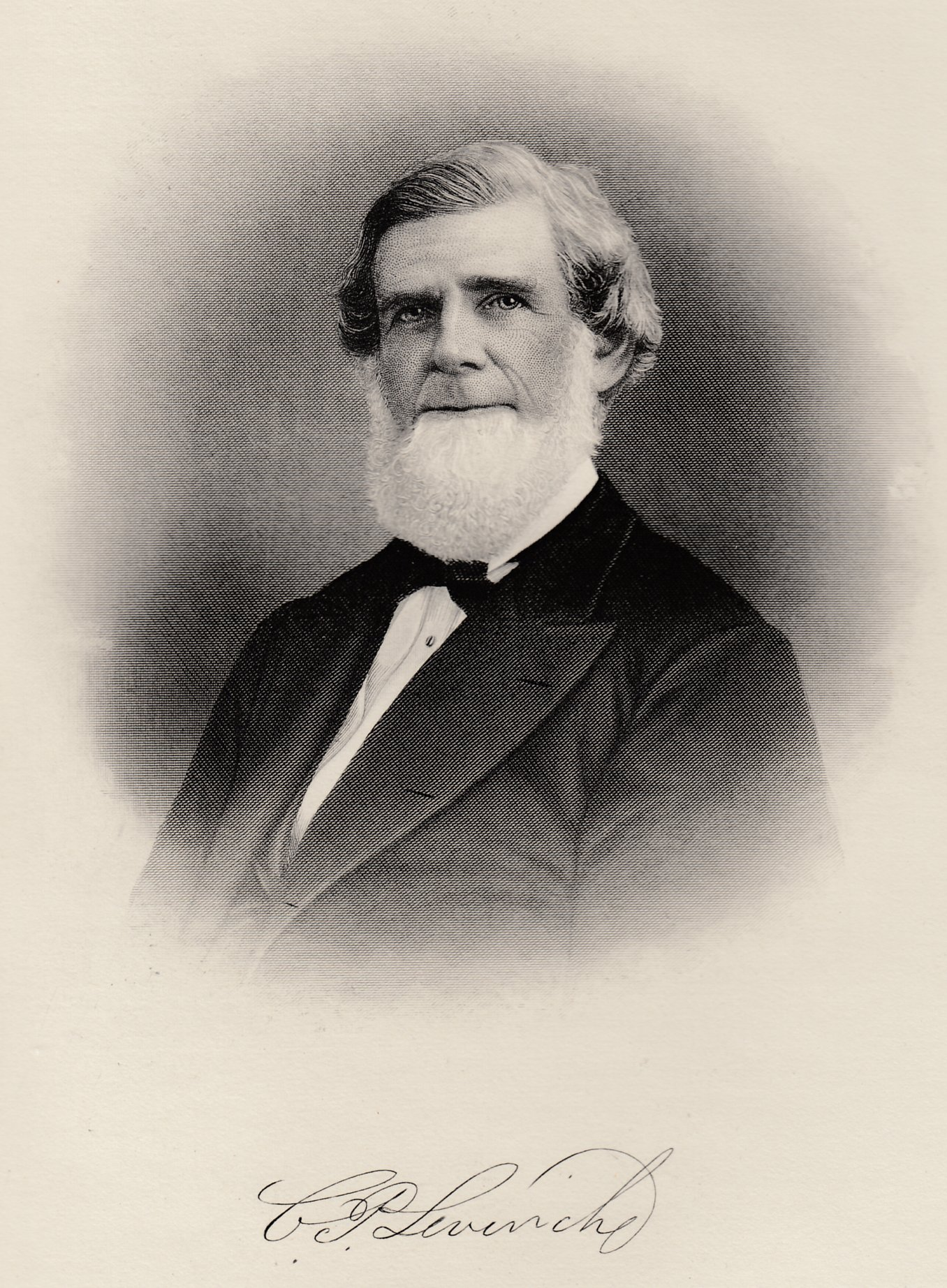

President of the Bank of New York
- In office 1863–1876
- Preceded by: Anthony P. Halsey
- Succeeded by: Charles M. Fry

Personal details
- Born: Charles Palmer Leverich; July 17, 1809 Elmhurst, Queens, New York
- Died: January 10, 1876 (aged 66) Union Place, New York
- Spouse: Matilda Duncan Gustine (m. 1839; died 1876)

Charles Palmer Leverich (July 17, 1809 – January 10, 1876) was an American banker.

== Early life ==
Leverich was born on July 17, 1809, in Newtown, Queens on L.I., N.Y. He had three brothers: Henry S. Leverich, James Harvey and Charles E. Leverich.

== Career ==
From 1834 onwards, he became a factor for Stephen Duncan, the wealthiest cotton and sugar planter in the Antebellum South. He also served as a factor to the Minor and Connor families. Additionally, he was a factor to planters William Newton Mercer, Levin Marshall, William St. John Elliot, Francis Surget and his son Francis Surget Jr., Sam Davis, William T. Palfrey, Mary Porter and John Julius Pringle. He operated under the name of 'Charles P. Leverich & Co.', with a Southern office in New Orleans, Louisiana.

He joined the board of directors of the Bank of New York in 1840. He went on to serve as its Vice-president in 1853 and its President from 1863 to 1876. In this capacity, he helped raise US$50,000,000 for the Union army during the American Civil War of 1861-1865.

== Personal life ==
Both he and his brother Henry married nieces of Stephen Duncan's. His wife, Matilda Duncan Gustine (1816–1896), was a daughter of James Gustine of Natchez, Mississippi. They married in Philadelphia on September 17, 1839, and had at least four children, including:

- Charles Duncan Leverich (1840–1925), who married Julia L. Riker, a daughter of John Lawrence Riker, in 1863. After her death in 1866, he married Frances "Fannie" Floyd-Jones, a daughter of William Floyd-Jones, in 1870.
- Sarah Eliza Leverich (1843–1851), who died young.
- James Henry Leverich (1849–1888), who married Mary Eleanor Wilmot in 1876.
- Matilda Rose Leverich (1852–1911), who married Dr. Theodore Dwight Bradford.
- William Edward Leverich (1857–1858), who died young.

He died at his home in Union Place on January 10, 1876.
