= Matthew Clarkson =

American politician and colonial soldier (1758-1825)

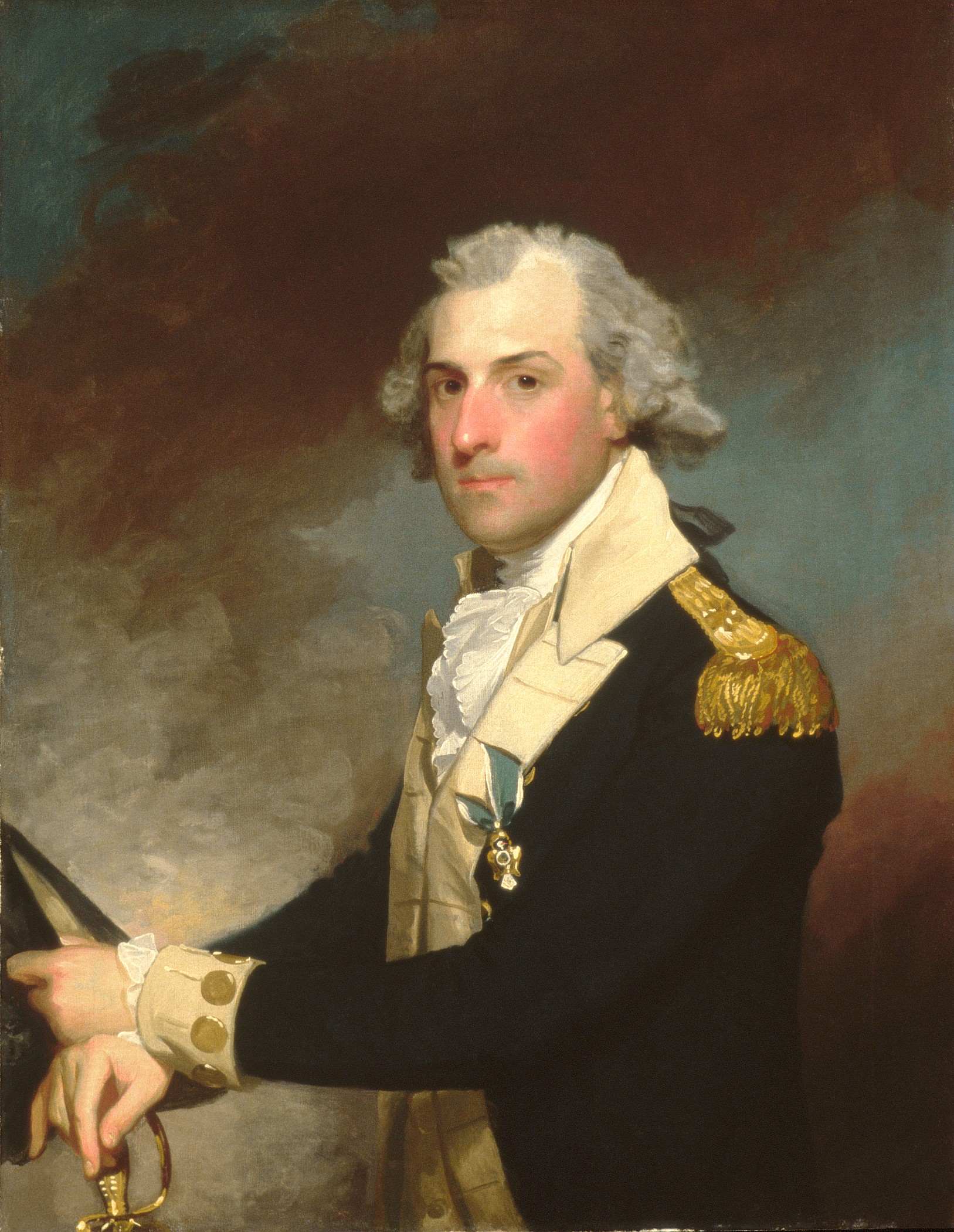
- Portrait of Clarkson by Gilbert Stuart (ca. 1794)

7th President of the Bank of New York
- In office 1804–1825
- Preceded by: Herman LeRoy
- Succeeded by: Charles Wilkes

Member of the New York State Senate for the Southern District
- In office July 1, 1793 – June 30, 1795
- Preceded by: Philip Van Cortlandt
- Succeeded by: Philip Livingston

Member of the New York State Assembly for New York County
- In office July 1, 1789 – June 30, 1790

Personal details
- Born: October 17, 1758 New York City, Province of New York, British America
- Died: April 25, 1825 (aged 66) New York City, New York, U.S.
- Party: Federalist
- Spouses: Mary Rutherfurd (m. 1785; died 1786) Sally Cornell (m. 1792; died 1803)
- Relations: John Clarkson Jay (grandson)
- Children: 8
- Parent(s): David Clarkson; Elisabeth French Clarkson

Military service
- Allegiance: United States of America; New York
- Branch/service: (New York (state)) New York State Militia
- Rank: Brigadier general
- Battles/wars: Revolutionary War: • Battle of Long Island • Battles of Saratoga

Matthew Clarkson (October 17, 1758 – April 25, 1825) was a colonial soldier and politician. Clarkson Street in Greenwich Village and the town of Clarkson in Western New York were both named after him.

== Early life ==
Clarkson was born on October 17, 1758, at his father's residence on Whitehall Street in New York City in the Province of New York in what was then British America. He was the son of David Clarkson (1726–1782) and Elisabeth (née French) Clarkson (1724–1808). His brother, Thomas Streatfeild Clarkson, was the grandfather of Thomas S. Clarkson, the namesake of Clarkson University.

Clarkson was the great-grandson of Matthew Clarkson, who emigrated to New York and served as a patent official in the 1690s. His father, Clarkson's great-great grandfather, was Rev. David Clarkson (1622–1686), the English born Puritan clergyman whose sermons included "The Doctrine of Justification is Dangerously Corrupted by the Roman Church." Through his mother, he was descended from Phillip French, the 27th Mayor of New York City.

== Career ==
At the age of 17, he entered the Army to serve in the Revolutionary War, first on Long Island, subsequently under Benedict Arnold. He was at Saratoga and, later, on the staff of General Benjamin Lincoln, was present at the surrender of Burgoyne, at Savannah (1779) and at the defense of Charleston (1780). He was also present at the surrender of Cornwallis.

After the war, Clarkson was commissioned brigadier general of militia of Kings and Queens Counties in June 1786 and Major General of the Southern District of New York in March 1798. For a time, he was engaged in merchant business with John Vanderbilt under the company Vanderbilt & Clarkson. The firm was later closed and he worked with his brother at the firm S. & L. Clarkson & Co.

=== Political service ===
When the war ended, Lincoln became Secretary of War and Clarkson became his assistant. He served as a Federalist member of the 13th New York State Legislature in the New York State Assembly for one term from 1789 to 1790, where he introduced a bill for the gradual abolition of slavery in the State.

As a Regent of the University of the State of New York he was presented at the court of French King Louis XVI. From 1791 to 1792, he served as U.S. Marshal. In 1793, he was elected to fill the vacancy, in place of Philip Van Cortlandt, as State Senator in the 17th New York State Legislature representing the Southern District, which consisted of Kings, New York, Queens, Richmond, Suffolk and Westchester counties. He served until 1795 after being reelected to the 18th Legislature, and resigning before he completed his full four year term. He was also a member of the commission to build a new prison 1796-1797 and President of the New York (City) Hospital (1799).

In 1802, Clarkson was the Federalist Party candidate for U.S. Senator from New York but was defeated by DeWitt Clinton. He was President of the Bank of New York from 1804, succeeding Herman LeRoy, and serving until his death in 1825. He was succeeded by Charles Wilkes.

== Philanthropy ==
Clarkson was one of the first trustees of New York's earliest savings bank established to serve laborers and the poor, The Bank for Savings in the City of New-York. His son-in-law Peter Augustus Jay was one of the bank's founders.

== Personal life ==
Coat of Arms of Matthew Clarkson

On May 24, 1785, Clarkson was married to Mary Rutherfurd (1761–1786), the daughter of Walter Rutherfurd and Catherine (née Alexander) Rutherfurd and the sister of U.S. Senator John Rutherfurd. Through her mother, she was the niece of William Alexander, Lord Stirling, and the granddaughter of James Alexander and Mary Alexander Provoost. Before her death in 1786, they were the parents of one child together:

- Mary Rutherfurd Clarkson (1786–1838), who married her cousin Peter Augustus Jay (1776–1843), the eldest son of Chief Justice John Jay and Sarah Van Brugh (née Livingston) Jay, in 1807.

His second marriage was on February 14, 1792, to Sally Cornell (1762–1803), the daughter of Samuel Cornell (1731–1781) and Susan (née Mabson) Cornell (1732–1778). Among Sally's siblings were Hannah Cornell (wife of Herman LeRoy) and Elizabeth Cornell (wife of William Bayard Jr.). Together they had eight children, including:

- Elizabeth Clarkson (1793–1820), who died unmarried.
- Catherine Rutherfurd Clarkson (1794–1861), who married Jonathan Goodhue, son of U.S. Senator Benjamin Goodhue.
- David Clarkson (1795–1867), who was President of the New York Stock Exchange, from 1837 to 1851, who married his cousin, Elizabeth Streatfield Clarkson, in 1822.
- Matthew Clarkson, Jr. (1796–1883), who married Catherine Elizabeth Clarkson in 1821.
- William Bayard Clarkson (1798–1875), who married Adelaide Margaret Livingston (1806–1885), daughter of Robert L. Livingston and granddaughter of Chancellor Robert R. Livingston, in 1826.
- Susan Maria Clarkson (1800–1823), who married James Ferguson de Peyster, brother of Frederic de Peyster, in 1822.
- Sarah Cornell Clarkson (1802–1849), who married Rev. William Richmond in 1826.

=== Legacy ===
On April 2, 1819, the town of Clarkson was established by the New York State Legislature and named in honor of General Clarkson. Although there is no evidence that he ever lived in Western New York, he reportedly owned a sizable amount of land there, and he gave 100 acres (405,000 m²) to the town, the rest of his interest was placed in trust for his children.

=== Descendants ===
Through his eldest daughter Mary, he was the grandfather of: John Clarkson Jay (1808–1891), a physician and noted conchologist, Catherine Helena Jay (1815–1889), who married Henry Augustus DuBois (1808–1884), in 1835. Anna Maria Jay (1819–1902), who married Henry Evelyn Pierrepont (1808–1888), in 1841, and Susan Matilda Jay (1827–1910), who married another of his grandchildren, Matthew Clarkson (1823–1913), the son of David Clarkson, in 1852.
