= John Oothout =

American banker (1789-1858)

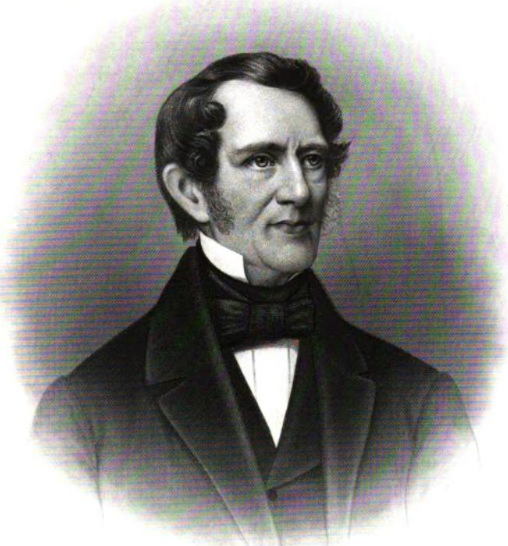

President of the Bank of New York
- In office 1843–1858
- Preceded by: Cornelius Heyer
- Succeeded by: Anthony P. Halsey

Personal details
- Born: 12 January 1789 New York City
- Died: 28 January 1858 (aged 69) New York City
- Spouse: Maria Josephine Youle (m. 1818; died 1858)
- Children: 8
- Parent(s): John Oothout; Magdalena van der Water

John Oothout (January 12, 1789 – January 28, 1858) was an American banker.

== Early life ==
Oothout was born in New York City on January 12, 1789. He was a son of John Oothout (1739–1804) and Magdalena (née van der Water) Oothout (1754–1826), a daughter of William van der Water. His father was an alderman of New York City and co-founder of the Bank of New York.

His paternal grandparents were Jan Oothout and Catalyntje (née Van Deusen) Oothouth. His aunt, Elizabeth Oothout, was the wife of John Tobias Ten Broeck (a grandson of Albany mayor Dirck Wesselse Ten Broeck).

== Career ==
He was educated in the office of Robert Lenox, "one of the most prominent merchants of that time." After the death of his father in 1804, he left Lenox's office and in 1823 became treasurer of the Chambers Street (later Bleecker Street) Savings Bank, serving until 1843.

He was elected a director of the Bank of New York in 1819. Upon the death of Cornelius Heyer, he was elected president of the Bank of New York in 1843, a position he held until his death in 1858. He was succeeded by Anthony P. Halsey.

== Personal life ==
On May 27, 1818, Oothout was married to Maria Josephine Youle (1796–1870), a daughter of Dr. Joseph Youle of New York. Together, they were the parents of:

- John Oothout (1819–1838), who died unmarried.
- Jane Oothout (1821–1839), who died unmarried.
- William Oothout (1823–1899), who was an iron and steel importer who married Jane Elizabeth Morgan, daughter of George Morgan and Pauline-Amélie (née Drouillard) Morgan, in 1855.
- Maria Josephine Oothout (1824–1877), who married James Bowen, president of Erie Railroad, in 1875.
- Henry Oothout (1826–1882), a merchant who married Josephine Julia d'Antoine Lentilion in 1850. After her death in 1869, he married C. Elizabeth Williams, a daughter of Charles Williams of Stamford, Connecticut, in 1876.
- Bleecker Oothout (1831–1863), who died unmarried.
- Edward Oothout (1834–1903), a broker who married Julia Caroline Drake, a daughter of William Henry Drake and Julia Scott (née Austin) Drake, in 1860.
- Eliza Oothout (1837–1915), who married wool merchant Louis Philippe Siebert in 1866.

Oothout died in New York City on January 28, 1858.
