= Charles Wilkes (banker) =

American banker (1764-1833)

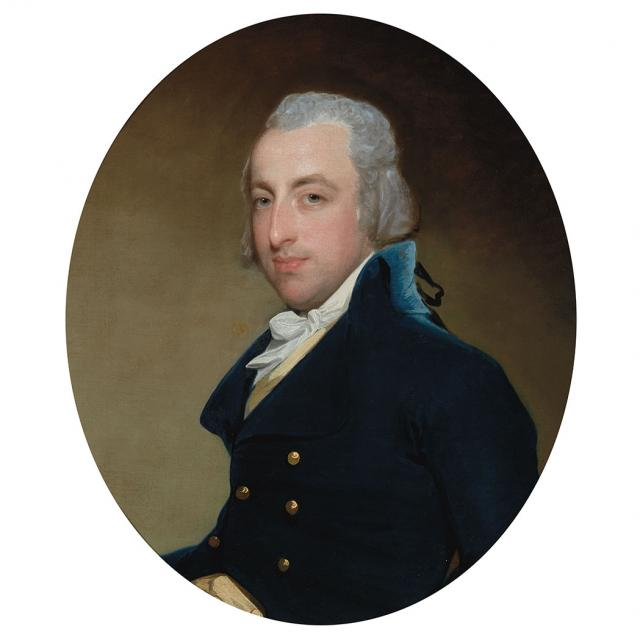
- Portrait of Wilkes, by Gilbert Stuart, c. 1794

President of the Bank of New York
- In office 1825–1832
- Preceded by: Matthew Clarkson
- Succeeded by: Cornelius Heyer

Personal details
- Born: 30 August 1764 London, England
- Died: 28 August 1833 (aged 68) New York City, New York, USA
- Spouse: Janet Shaw (m. 1787; died 1833)
- Relations: John Wilkes (uncle); Mary Hayley (aunt); Charles Wilkes (nephew)
- Children: 4
- Parent(s): Israel Wilkes III; Elizabeth de Ponthieu

Charles Wilkes (30 August 1764 – 28 August 1833) was a British born American banker.

== Early life ==
Wilkes was the son of Israel Wilkes III (1722–1805) and Elizabeth de Ponthieu (1726–1802). His siblings were John de Ponthieu Wilkes (who married Mary Seton, sister of Saint Elizabeth Ann Seton) and Frances Wilkes (who married Lewis Simond in New York in 1809). His father was a member of the firm De Ponthieu and Wilkes, together with Josias, Henry and John de Ponthieu.

His paternal grandparents were distiller Israel Wilkes Jr. and Sarah (née Heaton) Wilkes. His uncle was the John Wilkes, the radical journalist who served as MP for Aylesbury and Middlesex, High Sheriff of Buckinghamshire, Sheriff of London, and Lord Mayor of London. Through his brother John, he was uncle to Admiral Charles Wilkes and Eliza Wilkes (wife of John Vernon Henry). His aunt was Mary Wilkes Hayley (wife of George Hayley, an MP and merchant who served as President of Lloyd's of London). His maternal grandfather was the Huguenot merchant Josias de Ponthieu (son of Charles de Ponthieu, a refugee officer from Saintonge, and Marguerite de La Rochefoucauld). Through his uncle Henry de Ponthieu, he was a first cousin of John de Ponthieu, MP for Helston and Westbury.

== Career ==
He emigrated from England to America in c. 1782, reportedly "in company with John Jacob Astor on his return from a visit to Europe". Two years after arriving in the United States, he was among the organizers, amongst Alexander Hamilton, of the Bank of New York, in 1784, serving as its first teller. He succeeded William Seton as Cashier of the Bank in 1794. He served as Cashier in the New York branch of the Bank of the United States. Upon the resignation of General Matthew Clarkson, he was elected president of the Bank of New York in 1825, a position he held until 1832.

Wilkes was a trustee of the New York Society Library from 1793 to 1794 and, again, from 1798 to 1824. He was also the first treasurer of the New-York Historical Society, serving from 1805 to 1818.

== Personal life ==
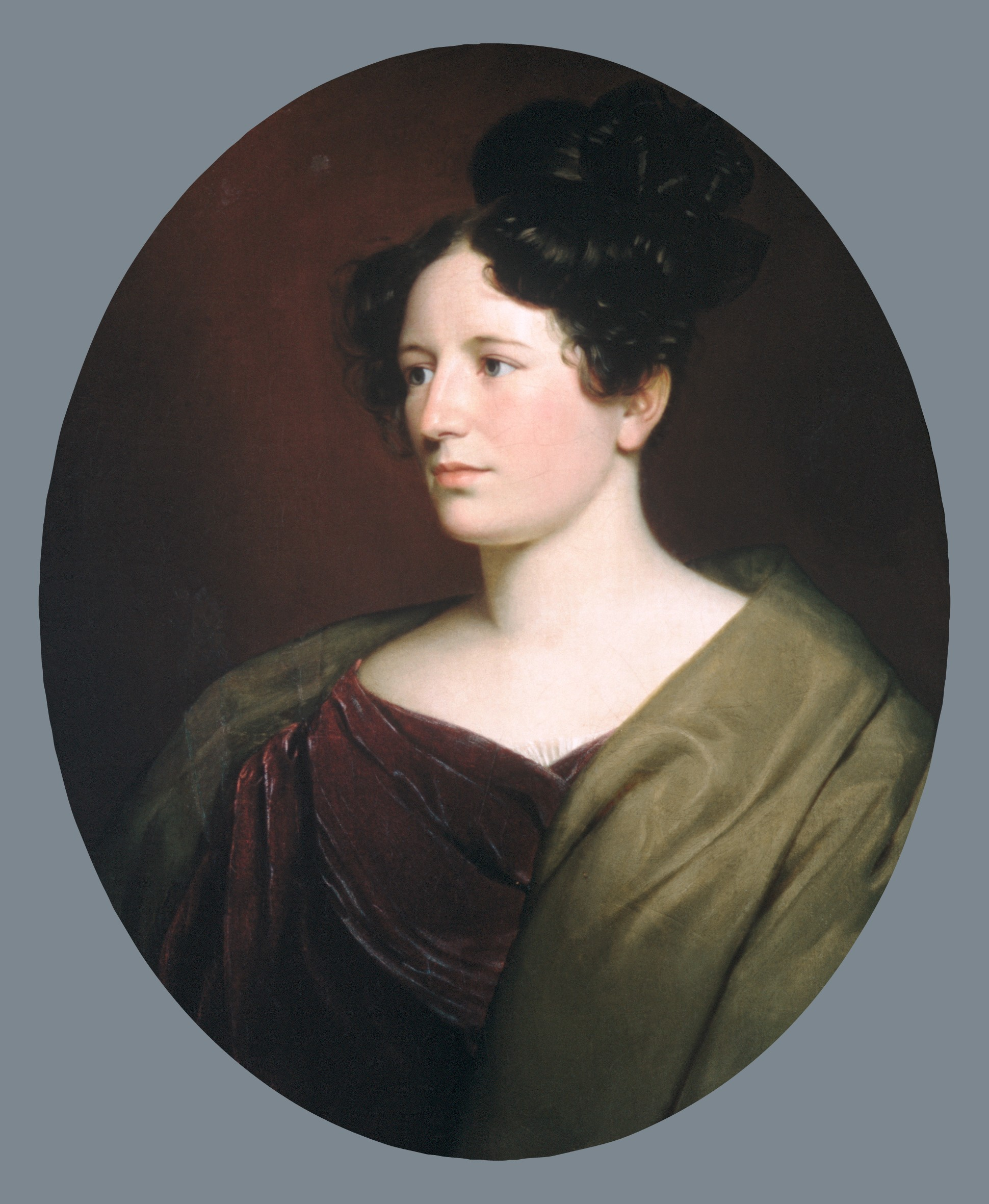
Portrait of his daughter Frances Colden, by Charles C. Ingham, 1830

In 1787 Wilkes was married to Janet Shaw (1762–1851), the daughter of David Shaw, Esq., a Scotch gentleman. Wilkes and his wife were friends of James Fenimore Cooper. Together, they were the parents of:

- Charlotte Wilkes (1791–1850), who married, as his second wife, Francis Jeffrey, Lord Jeffrey, MP for Perth Burghs, Malton, and Edinburgh, in 1813. (Note: Francis Jeffrey (1773–1850), who became Lord Advocate in 1830, was the nephew of Scottish merchant Patrick Jeffrey, (c. 1748–1812), who had married Charlotte's wealthy great-aunt, Mary Wilkes Hayley (1728–1808), as her third husband, in Boston in 1786.)
- Frances Wilkes (1796–1877), who married David Cadwallader Colden, only son of Mayor and U.S. Representative Cadwallader David Colden and Maria (née Provoost) Colden.
- Ann Wilkes (1800–1890), who never married.
- Dr. George Wilkes (1801–1876), who married Harriet King, a daughter of U.S. Representative James Gore King and Sarah Rogers (née Gracie) King, in 1836.

Wilkes died on 1833 and was buried at Trinity Church Cemetery.
