= Herbert L. Griggs =

American banker

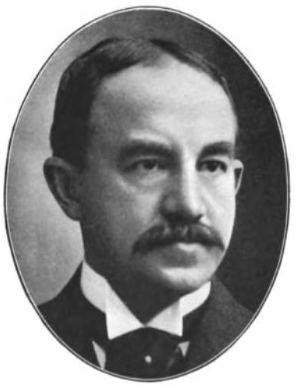
- Photograph of Griggs, c. 1904

President of the Bank of New York
- In office 1901–1922
- Preceded by: Ebenezer S. Mason
- Succeeded by: Edwin G. Merrill

Personal details
- Born: Herbert Lebau Griggs; March 28, 1855 Boston, Massachusetts
- Died: September 19, 1944 (aged 89) Mountain View House, Whitefield, New Hampshire
- Spouse: Emily F. Thompson (m. 1889; died 1938)
- Children: Arthur Kingsland Griggs
- Parent(s): Benjamin Franklin Griggs; Catherine Frances Gill
- Education: The English High School

Herbert Lebau Griggs (March 28, 1855 – September 19, 1944) was an American banker who served as President of the Bank of New York.

== Early life ==
Griggs was born on March 28, 1855 at Boston, Massachusetts (though some sources say Newton, Massachusetts). He was a son of Catherine Frances (née Gill) Griggs (1827–1908) and Benjamin Franklin Griggs, a hay and grain dealer in Boston. His sister, Bertha Williams Griggs, was the wife of George Devereaux Silsbee (a grandson of Massachusetts Representative Nathaniel Silsbee Jr.).

His paternal grandparents were John Griggs and Sarah Davies (née Williams) Griggs and his maternal grandparents were Thomas Gill and Catherine (née Lebeaux) Gill. Through his grandfather, he was a direct descendant of Thomas Griggs, who emigrated to Boston from England in 1638. His maternal uncle, William Fearing Gill, one of the first biographers of Edgar Allan Poe, was married to Edith Olivia Gwynne (a sister of Alice Claypoole Gwynne, wife of Cornelius Vanderbilt II).

Griggs attended the English High School in Boston, graduating in 1869.

== Career ==
In 1869, at the age of fifteen, Griggs joined Kidder, Peabody & Company as an apprentice. The Boston firm had been founded in 1865 by Henry P. Kidder, Francis H. Peabody, and Oliver W. Peabody. In 1877, he was transferred to the New York branch and, in 1886, he was made a partner. After fifteen years as a partner of the firm, he accepted a partnership with Baring, Magoun & Company, successors to the New York office of Kidder, Peabody & Co., founded by Tom Baring and George C. Magoun. Following the death of Ebenezer S. Mason in 1900, he was elected President of the Bank of New York in 1901. During his twenty-one years as president, the bank's capital, profits and total deposits tripled. He orchestrated the merger with the New York Life Insurance and Trust Company into the Bank of New York and Trust Company. Upon the completion of the merger in 1922, he became chairman of the board and was succeeded as president by Edwin G. Merrill. Griggs served as board chairman until his retirement in 1925.

Griggs also served as a board member of the Eagle Fire Insurance Company of America, the Phoenix Indemnity Company, the Sun Indemnity Company and was a trustee of the Atlantic Mutual Company.

== Personal life ==
In 1889, he married Emily F. Thompson (1864–1938), the daughter of New York banker Joseph Thompson. In New York, they lived at 375 Park Avenue and then 1 East 86th Street. Together, they were the parents of a son:

- Arthur Kingsland Griggs (1891–1934), a translator, writer and literary critic who lived, and died, in France.

His wife, who volunteered in France during World War I and was awarded the Legion of Honour, died in Paris in 1938. He returned to the United States at the outset of World War II, setting up residence at the Savoy-Plaza Hotel in New York and summering at Mountain View House in the White Mountains of New Hampshire, where he died on September 19, 1944.
