= Anthony P. Halsey =

American banker (1794-1863)

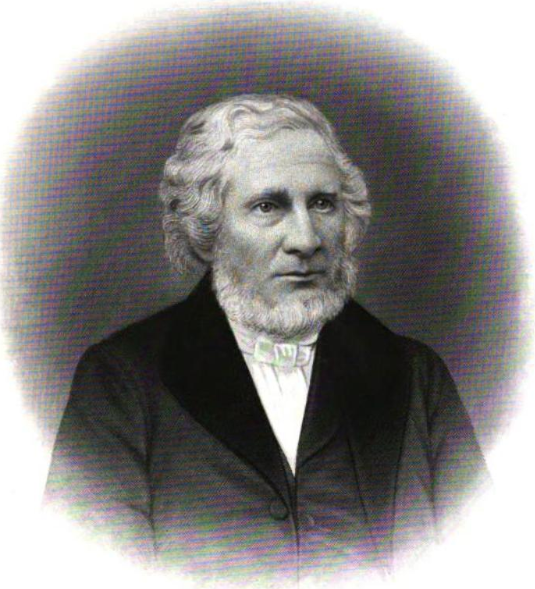

President of the Bank of New York
- In office 1858–1863
- Preceded by: John Oothout
- Succeeded by: Charles P. Leverich

Personal details
- Born: Anthony Post Halsey; August 30, 1794 Manhattan, New York
- Died: August 26, 1863 (aged 68) Orange, New Jersey
- Spouse: Irene Winifred Wetmore (m. 1820; died 1863)
- Children: 9
- Parent(s): Jabez Halsey; Euphemia Brouwer

Anthony Post Halsey (August 30, 1794 – August 26, 1863) was an American banker.

== Early life ==
Halsey was born on August 30, 1794, at Liberty Street in New York City. He was a son of Jabez Halsey (1762–1820), who served in the New York Militia during the War of 1812, and Euphemia "Effie" (née Brouwer) Halsey (1759–1846). His elder brother, James, died at sea in 1795.

His grandfather, Sylvanus Halsey, served in the Revolutionary War as did his uncle, James Halsey. The family settled in Southampton, New York.

== Career ==
Halsey began his business education in the counting-room of Messrs. Isaac Moses & Co., before deciding to focus on banking.

He first joined the Bank of New York as a clerk, then teller, cashier from 1832 to 1856 and became vice-president in 1856. Following the death of John Oothout in 1858, Halsey was elected to succeed him as President of the Bank of New York. He served as president until he "resigned the office of president of the bank on account of failing health. His resignation was accepted on the 14th, and Charles P. Leverich was elected to fill the vacancy." After 47 years with the bank, Halsey died on August 26, 1863.

== Personal life ==
On March 23, 1820, Halsey was married to Irene Winifred Wetmore (1800–1882), the daughter of Noah Wetmore and Winifred (née Smith) Wetmore. Through her brother Apollos, she was aunt to New York State Senator Henry C. Wetmore. Together, they were the parents of:

- James Wetmore Halsey (1821–1886), who married Agnes McClure in 1844. After her death in 1867, he married Annie Dennett, a daughter of George Dennett, in 1876.
- Cornelia Brouwer Halsey (1823–1870), who died unmarried.
- Seton Halsey (1826–1888), a farmer who married Frances Eliza Dean in 1854.
- Mary Wetmore Halsey (b. 1827), who married jeweler James Adams Dwight Jr., a grandson of Jonathan Edwards Dwight (himself a brother of Yale president Timothy Dwight IV, both grandsons of theologian Jonathan Edwards), in 1849.
- Henry Martin Halsey (1829–1829), who died young.
- Noah Wetmore Halsey (1830–1834), who died young.
- Euphemia Halsey (1833–1877), who married Joseph Wales, a son of Nathaniel Wales, in 1857.
- Elizabeth Halsey (1836–1836), who died young.
- Anna Halsey (b. 1838), who died unmarried.

He was "prominent in the development of the public-school system" of New York City and served as an elder of the Pearl Street Presbyterian Church and the Central Presbyterian Church in New York City.

Halsey died on August 26, 1863, in Orange, New Jersey. He was buried at Green-Wood Cemetery in Brooklyn.

=== Descendants ===
Through his son James, he was a grandfather of Anthony Post Halsey II (1845–1910), a merchant who moved to California and married Emma Eugenia Vail (sister of Theodore Newton Vail and niece of John Alonzo Quinby, the 13th Mayor of San Jose, California, and Brig.-Gen. Isaac Ferdinand Quinby).
