= Astor Row =

Houses in Manhattan, New York

Coordinates: 40°48′36″N 73°56′29″W

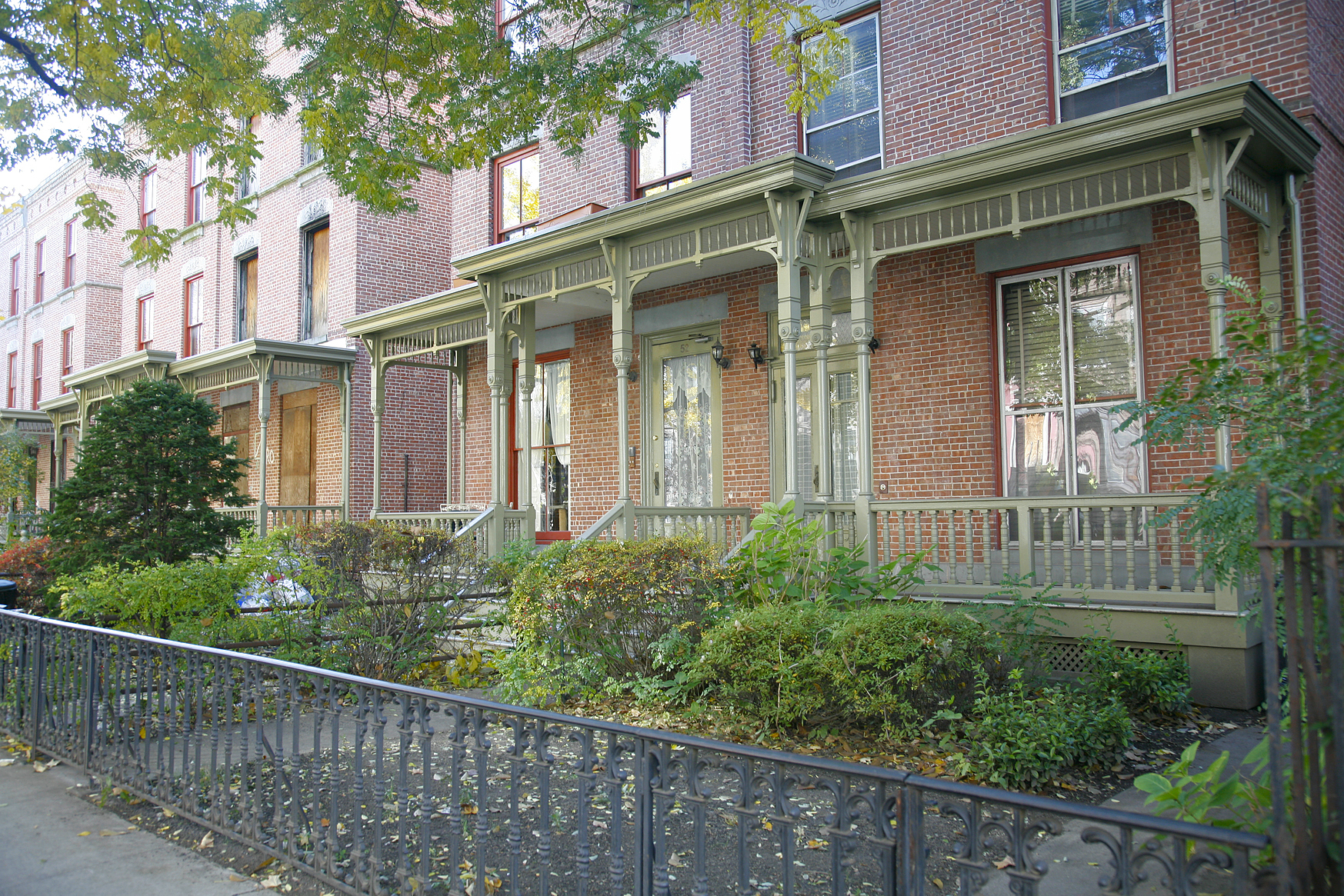
Astor Row (2007)

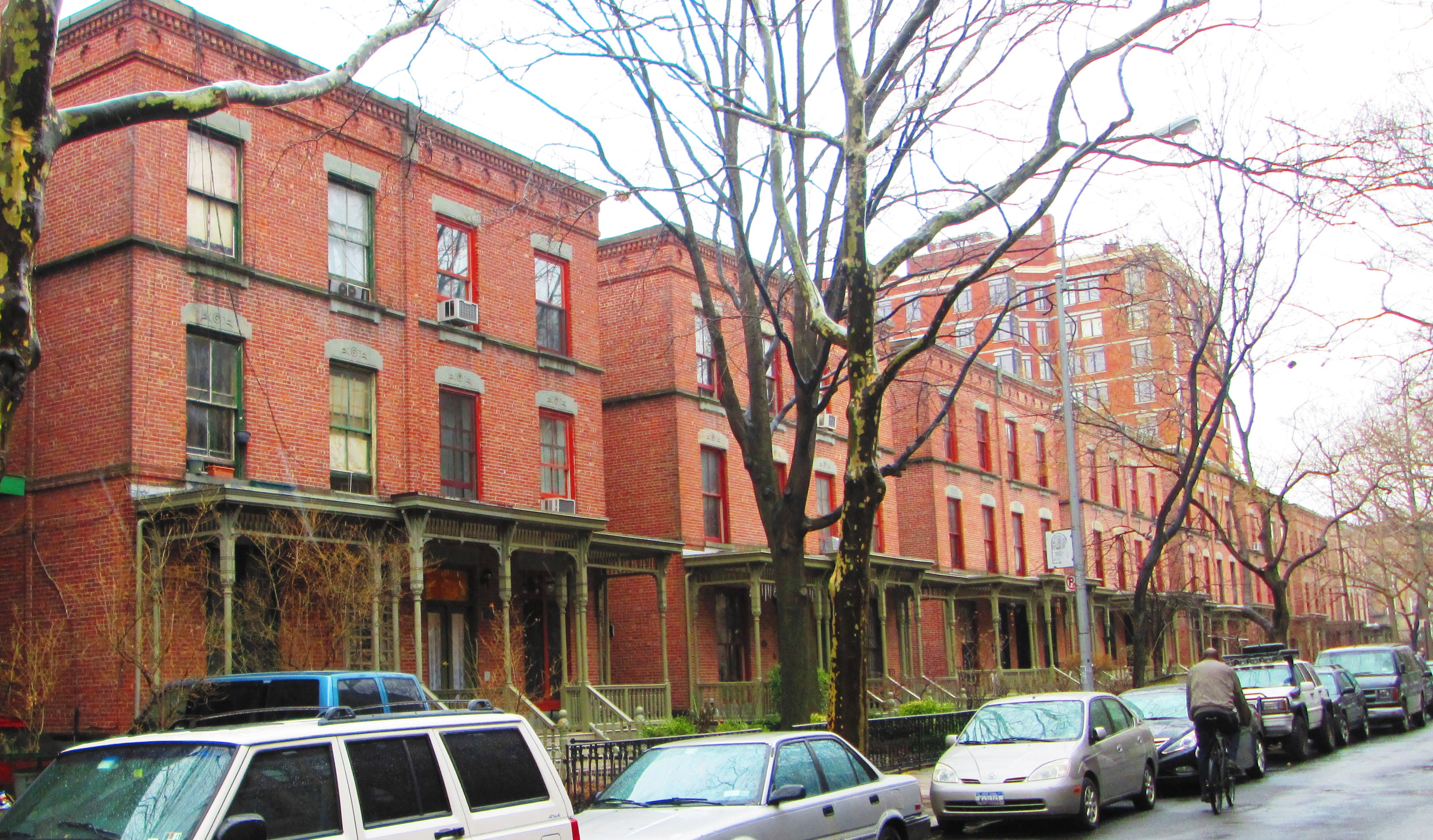
The western end of the Row (2014)

Astor Row is a group of 28 row houses on the south side of West 130th Street, between Fifth and Lenox Avenues in the Harlem neighborhood of Manhattan, New York City, which were among the first speculative townhouses built in the area. Designed by Charles Buek, the houses were built between 1880 and 1883. John Jacob Astor's grandson, William Backhouse Astor, Jr., was the driving force behind the development.

The design of the three-story brick, single-family houses is unusual, in that they are set back from the street. All have front and side yards – an oddity in Manhattan – as well as wooden porches. The first group of houses, numbers 8 through 22, comprises freestanding pairs, while the remainder, numbers 24 through 60, are connected together at the rear.

The Astor Row houses were designated New York City Landmarks on August 11, 1981. The houses are also on the New York State Register of Historic Places.

== History ==
The houses were built between 1880 and 1883 in three phases, on land John Jacob Astor had purchased in 1844 for $10,000. When William Backhouse Astor Jr. died, the houses were divided among his grandchildren: Mary, James, and Sarah Van Alen. Ownership stayed in the Astor family until 1911, when the westernmost 10 houses were sold to real estate investor Max Marx, who partially traded them for an apartment building in Washington Heights. The new owners, the Brown Realty Company, defaulted on their mortgage, and the houses passed to the New York Savings Bank.

In 1920, the houses were described by a reporter for The New York Times as "one of the most attractive and exclusive home centers" in Harlem, presenting "a picture of domestic tranquility and comfort which few other blocks in the city possess."

The Astor Row townhouses rented originally for $1,100 per year and were so popular that for years there was a waiting list for them. The townhouses were occupied originally by whites, but in 1920, 20 of the 28 houses – the 10 owned by New York Savings Bank, plus 10 still owned by the Astors – were purchased by James Cruikshank, a real estate operator and leased to black tenants.

Generally, the houses were not well maintained, and the porches were gradually lost. In 1978, the second edition of the AIA Guide to New York City described the row as having "restrained beauty which has been tarnished by years of economic distress." In 1981, New York City designated the entire row as landmarks, and money was raised to restore their facades, and improve their plumbing, heating systems, and electrical lines where needed. The group overseeing and financing the work included the New York Landmarks Conservancy, New York City Landmarks Preservation Commission (LPC), the Vincent Astor Foundation, Manhattan Community Board 10, the Abyssinian Development Corporation, the Commonwealth Fund, the New York City Department of Housing Preservation and Development, and several local banks. In 1992, Ella Fitzgerald performed at a benefit at Radio City Music Hall to raise money for the restoration. By the end of the 1990s, the porches and other decorative elements had been restored to almost all the buildings on the block. In August 2009, The New York Times would write "the block is at the center of an intense but, as yet, unfinished revival of the surrounding streets in Central Harlem." The restoration of the row was overseen by Roberta Washington and Li/Saltzman. In late 2021, the house at 28 West 130th Street was demolished following several years of degradation, years after the LPC had sued the house's owner to force her to repair the house.

== In popular culture ==
In his novel Home to Harlem (1928), Claude McKay described Astor Row as "the block beautiful."

== See also ==
- List of New York City Designated Landmarks in Manhattan above 110th Street

== Bibliography ==
- Adams, Michael Henry (2002). Harlem: Lost and Found. Monacelli. p. 103.
- Gill, Brendan (November 2, 1992). "The Sky Line: On Astor Row". The New Yorker. p. 51.
- "Past & Present On Astor Row in Harlem, Two Restorations Stand As Reminders Of What Once Was". Newsday. October 8, 1992. p. 77.
