= 1802 United States Senate special election in New York =

The 1802 United States Senate special election in New York was held on February 9, 1802, by the New York State Legislature to elect a U.S. senator (Class 3) to represent the State of New York in the United States Senate.

== Background ==
John Armstrong had been re-elected in January 1801 to a full term (1801–1807), but resigned on February 5, 1802. At the last state election, George Clinton had been elected Governor again, serving now his seventh term, and his Democratic-Republican Party had won a large majority to the Assembly which could outvote the small Federalist Senate majority in a joint ballot. Aaron Burr accused the Clintons later to have hatched a scheme to seat DeWitt Clinton, the governor's nephew, in the U.S. Senate. Burr affirmed that Thomas Tillotson, a brother-in-law of Chancellor Robert R. Livingston like Armstrong, was appointed Secretary of State of New York in 1801 as part of a deal which required Tillotson to procure Armstrong's resignation.

At the State election in April 1801, the Democratic-Republican Party won a large majority in the Assembly, and half of the 12 State Senate seats up for renewal. The 25th New York State Legislature met from January 26 to April 5, 1802, at Albany, New York.

== Candidates ==
State Senator DeWitt Clinton ran as the candidate of the Democratic-Republican Party.

Ex-State Senator (1794–1795) Matthew Clarkson was the Federalist candidate.

== Result ==
Clarkson was nominated by the Senate, Clinton by the Assembly. The Legislature then proceeded to a joint ballot, and Clinton was elected. This was the first time that a joint ballot was necessary to choose between the nominees of different majorities in the houses of the Legislature.

1802 United States Senator special election result
| Office | House | Democratic-Republican | | Federalist | |
|---|---|---|---|---|---|
| U.S. Senator | State Senate (44 members) | DeWitt Clinton | 16 | Matthew Clarkson | 19 |
| | State Assembly (107 members) | DeWitt Clinton | 68 | Matthew Clarkson | 28 |
| | Joint ballot (151 members) | DeWitt Clinton | 82 | Matthew Clarkson | 45 |

== Aftermath ==
Clinton took his seat on February 23, 1802, but resigned on November 4, 1803, and Armstrong was appointed by Governor Clinton to re-take his former seat. In February 1804, a special election was held by the State Legislature to fill both seats in the U.S. Senate and, either due to a mistake or to give Armstrong two more years to serve, Armstrong was then elected to the Class 1 seat (term 1803–1809), and John Smith to the Class 3 seat (term 1801–1807) on which Clinton and Armstrong had sat. Armstrong set a record that still stands after more than 200 years, presenting four different credentials to take a seat in the U.S. Senate within as many years, being three times elected and once appointed. Armstrong resigned his seat again on June 30, 1804, after his appointment as U.S. Minister to France.

== Sources ==
- The New York Civil List compiled in 1858 (see: pg. 63 for U.S. Senators; pg. 118 for State Senators 1801–02; page 175 for Members of Assembly 1801–02)
- Members of the 7th United States Congress
- Members of the 8th United States Congress
- History of Political Parties in the State of New-York by Jabez Delano Hammond (pages 183f)
- Election result at Tufts University Library project "A New Nation Votes"
