= List of presidents of the Bank of New York =

Presidents of the Bank of New York

The following is a list of presidents of Bank of New York from inception in 1784 until its 2007 merger with Mellon Financial.

== History ==
The Walton Mansion housed the Bank of New York from 1784 to 1787.

The Bank of New York was formed following a June 1784 meeting at a coffee house on St. George's Square. The bank operated without a charter for seven years. The bank opened on June 9, 1784, with Alexander McDougall as the first president and William Seton as Cashier. Its first offices were in the old Walton Mansion in New York City. In 1787, it moved to a site on Hanover Square that the New York Cotton Exchange later moved into.

The bank provided the United States government its first loan in 1789. The loan was orchestrated by Alexander Hamilton, then Secretary of the Treasury, and it paid the salaries of United States Congress members and President George Washington. The Bank of New York was the first company to be traded on the New York Stock Exchange when it first opened in 1792. In 1796, the bank moved to a location at the corner of Wall Street and William Street, which would later become 48 Wall Street.

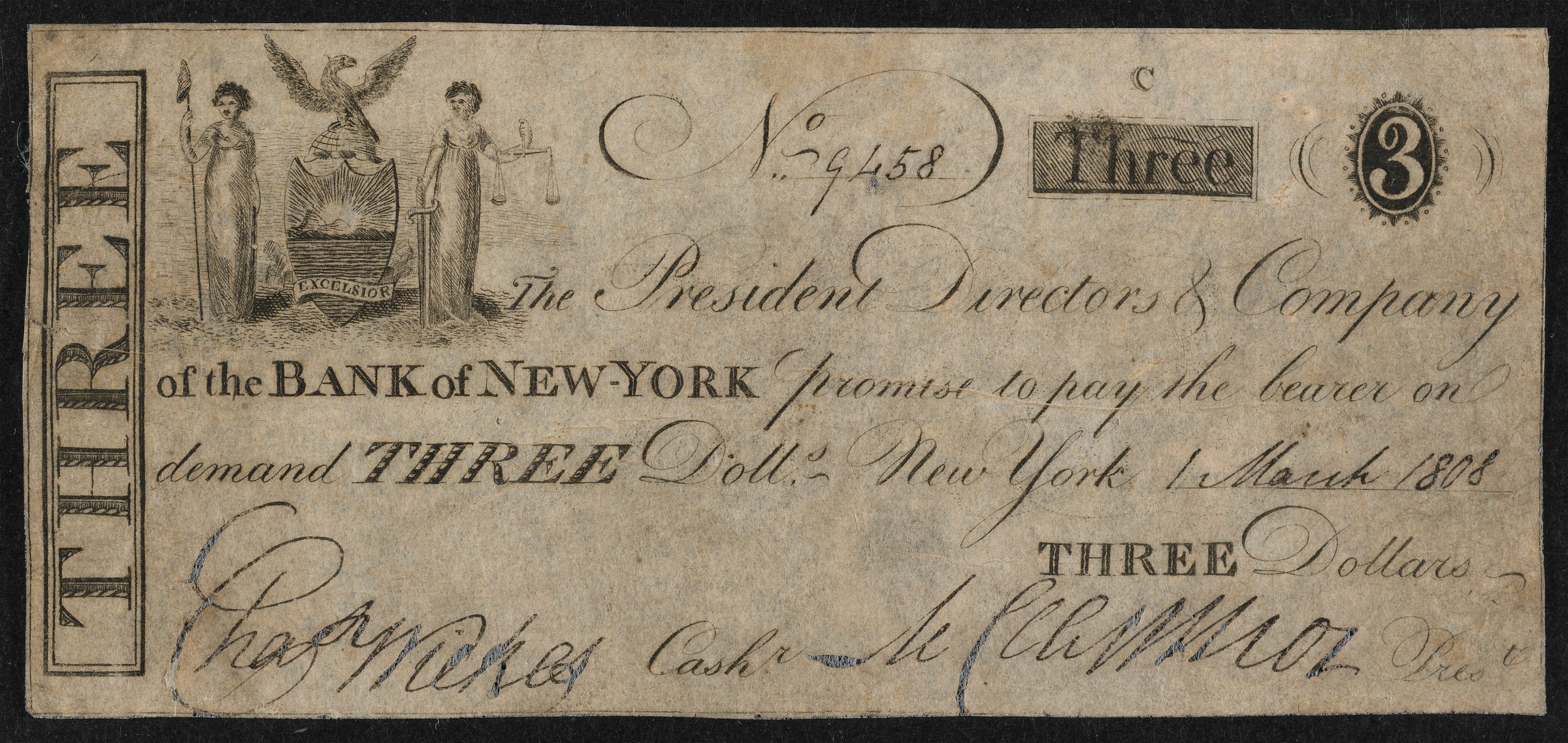
1808 Bank of New York 3 dollar banknote

In 1969, the Bank of New York Company was established as a holding company with the Bank of New York as the largest operating unit of Company. Elliott Averett, who joined the bank in 1940, was elected president of the bank in 1968, became chief executive officer in 1973 and chairman of both the bank and the holding company in 1974. J. Carter Bacot was appointed president of the bank in 1974 and president of the holding company five years later. In January 1982, Bacot became chief executive officer and chairman following the death of Averett. Bacot continued to hold his other posts of president of the holding company and president and chief executive officer of the bank.

== Presidents ==
#	Photo	Name	Term start	Term end	Ref
1		Alexander McDougall	1784	1785	
2		Jeremiah Wadsworth	1785	1786	
3		Isaac Roosevelt	1786	1791	
4		Gulian Verplanck†	1791	1799	
5		Nicholas Gouverneur†	1799	1802	
6		Herman LeRoy	1802	1804	
7		Matthew Clarkson†	1804	1825	
8		Charles Wilkes	1825	1832	
9		Cornelius Heyer†	1832	1843	
10		John Oothout†	1843	1858	
11		Anthony P. Halsey†	1858	1863	
12		Charles P. Leverich†	1863	1876	
13		Charles M. Fry	1876	1892	
14		Ebenezer S. Mason†	1892	1900	
15		Herbert L. Griggs	1901	1922	
16		Edwin G. Merrill	1922	1931	
17		John C. Traphagen	1931	1948	
18		Albert C. Simmonds Jr.	1948	1957	
19		Donald M. Elliman	1957	1961	
20		Samuel H. Woolley	1962	1968	
21		Elliott Averett	1968	1974	
22		J. Carter Bacot	1974	1982	
23		Peter Herrick	1982	1992	
24		Thomas A. Renyi	1992	2007	

†	Died in office

== Chairman of the Board of Trustees ==
#	Photo	Name	Term start	Term end	Ref
		John C. Traphagen	1948	1957	
		Albert C. Simmonds Jr.	1957	1963	
		Charles M. Bliss	1963	1968	
		Samuel H. Woolley	1969	1974	
		Elliott Averett†	1974	1982	
		J. Carter Bacot	1982	1998	
		Thomas A. Renyi	1998	2007	

†	Died in office
