= Charles Buek =

Charles Buek (died June 27, 1931) was a developer and architect in New York City in the late 19th and early 20th centuries. He worked mostly on the east side of Manhattan, in the years between 1880 and 1914. Buek was known primarily for the large, elaborate private homes and apartments he designed for wealthy clients.

He started his career in the firm of Duggin & Crossman in 1870. When this firm dissolved, Buek established his own office as Charles Buek & Co., with Charles Duggin as his partner. Much of their work centered on the east side of Manhattan, on Lexington and Madison Avenues, from the 1830s to the 1870s. Later they produced some buildings In the West 72nd Street area. Among his surviving projects are 20 East 69th Street, 829 Madison Avenue, and Astor Row.

Buek's clients included George Moore, Charles Dana, Charles M. Fry and John A. Stewart.
