= Walter Katte =

Civil engineer

Colonel Walter Katte (November 14, 1830 – March 4, 1917) was a British-born American civil engineer. Katte led design and construction of Eads Bridge at St. Louis, Park Avenue Viaduct, and construction of the Weehawken Tunnel in New Jersey. He was Chief Engineer of the New York Central Railroad company, a founding member of the Western Society of Engineers and one of the early members and director of the American Society of Civil Engineers. Katte was also responsible for the construction of railroad stations on Harlem Line: Melrose, Morrisania, Tremont and Fordham station. Katte was a Colonel of Engineers in the Union Army during the Civil War. The New York Times called Katte a "famous engineer".

== Life and career ==
Katte was born in London, England on November 14, 1830, and graduated from King's College London. He immigrated to the United States in 1849. Katte served as Chief Engineer of the New York Elevated Railroad Company (1877-1886), and then as Chief Engineer of the New York Central Railroad company from 1886 to 1898 until his retirement.
