= Tom Renyi =

Tom Renyi (born 1947) is the former chairman and chief executive officer (CEO) of the Bank of New York Company, a position he held since 1997. He is also the former executive chairman of The Bank of New York Mellon Corporation, following BNY and Mellon's merger on July 1, 2007.

== Background ==
Renyi graduated from Rutgers University with a BA in business administration in 1968 and an MBA from the Rutgers Graduate School of Management in 1969. He also served as a first lieutenant of military intelligence with the US Army in Vietnam.

For years Renyi has been considered by his peers as a distinguished leader in the financial services industry. He serves on the board of executives at the New York Stock Exchange and the board of directors of Public Service Enterprise Group Incorporated and the New York Clearing House. Renyi has successfully directed The Bank of New York's transformation from a traditional commercial bank to a global leader in securities servicing. In 1989, he headed the transition team responsible for integrating the Irving Trust Company into The Bank of New York, the largest merger in the United States banking industry at the time. Since becoming chief executive officer in 1997, Renyi has accelerated the banks strategic evolution through 54 acquisitions, including RBS Trust in 1999 and Pershing LLC in 2003.

== During the Bank of New York Scandal ==
On September 22, 1999, Renyi testified before United States House of Representatives and United States Senate hearings, conducted in 1999 and 2000, amidst the Bank of New York scandal, during which billions of dollars from Russia were laundered through the Bank, which has long been considered one of the most respected financial pillars of America. Renyi admitted that allowing the suspect accounts "to remain open and active without sufficient questioning was a lapse on the part of the bank."
