= Gobel =

Gobel is a surname. Persons with this name include:

- David Gobel (born 1952), American author and entrepreneur
- George Gobel (1919–1991), American comedian
- James Gobel born 1972), American contemporary visual artist, painting
- Jason Gobel (born 1970), American guitarist and engineer
- Jean-Baptiste-Joseph Gobel (1727–1794), French Roman Catholic cleric and politician of the Revolution
- Jean-Paul Gobel (born 1943), French cleric, diplomat of the Holy See
- Konrad Gobel (1498–1557), German metal craftsman
- Mathieu Gobel (born 1980), French sprint canoer
- Rachmad Gobel (born 1962), Indonesian businessman and politician

== See also ==
- Göbel, a surname
- Goebel, a surname
- Goble, a surname
