= Göpel =

Göpel or Goepel is a surname of Germanic origin, which stems from the ancient Germanic personal name Godebald composed of the elements gōd "good" or god "god" + bald "bold brave". Persons with this name include:

== Göpel ==
- Adolph Göpel (1812–1847), German mathematician
- Barbara Göpel (1922–2017), German art historian
- Erhard Göpel (1906–1966), German art historian and high level Nazi agent
- Maja Göpel (born 1976), German political economist, transformation researcher, and sustainability scientist

== Goepel ==
- Lutz Goepel (1942–2026), German politician
- Steve Goepel (born 1949), American football player and coach

== See also ==
- Göbel, a surname
- Gobel, a surname
- Goebel, a surname
