= Traum von Monte Carlo =

1943 painting by Max Beckmann

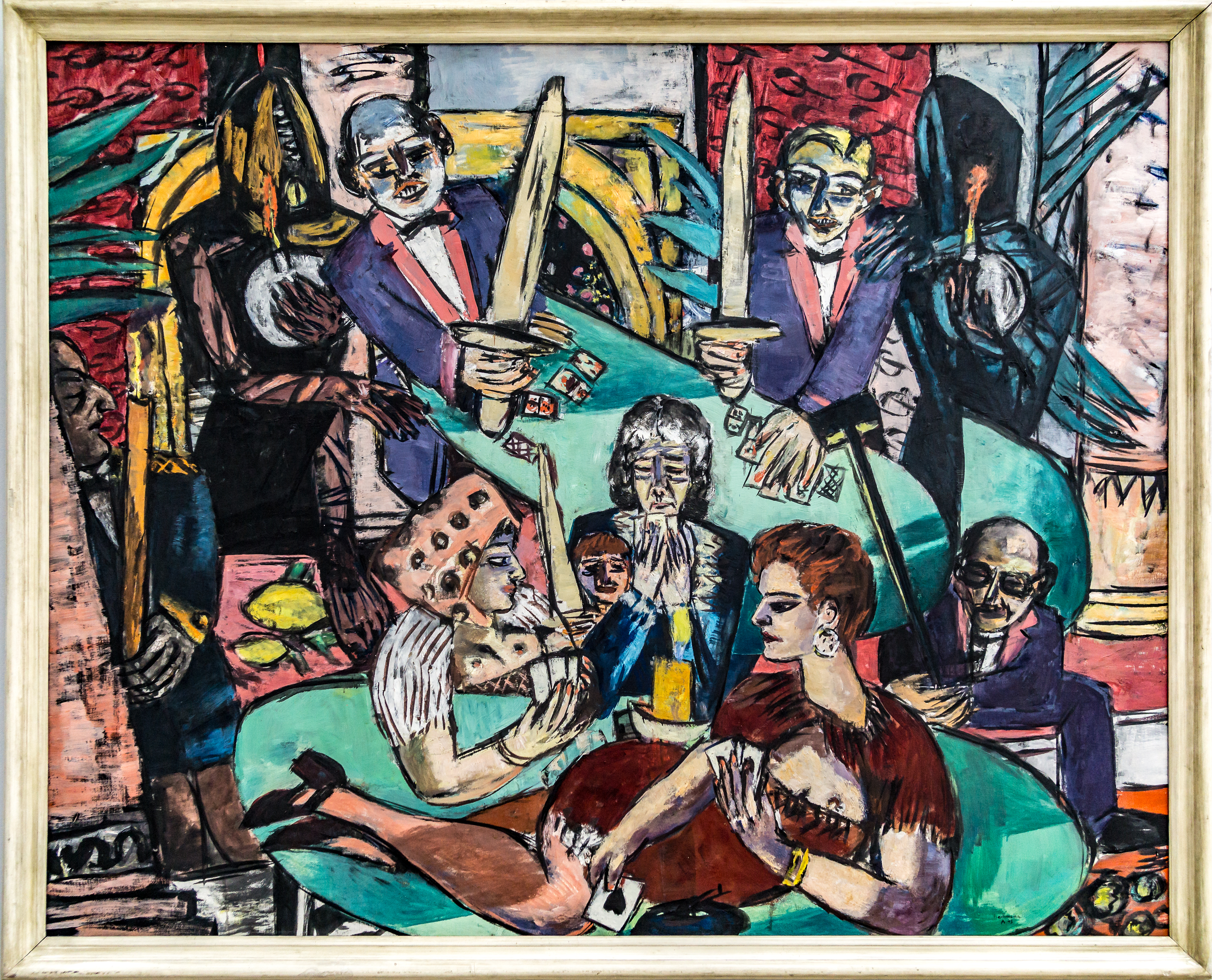
- Artist: Max Beckmann
- Year: 1939–1943
- Medium: Oil on canvas
- Dimensions: 160 cm (63 in) × 200 cm (79 in)
- Location: Staatsgalerie Stuttgart, Stuttgart
- Accession: Inv. no. 2497

Traum von Monte Carlo ([tʁaʊ̯m fon ˌmon.teˈkar.lo], 'Dream of Monte Carlo') is an oil painting on canvas by the German artist Max Beckmann, created between 1939 and 1943 during his exile in Amsterdam. The work portrays a surreal and symbolically charged casino scene inspired by Beckmann’s visit to the Casino de Monte-Carlo in 1939. Within a theatrical composition filled with croupiers, masked figures, and gamblers, the painting merges themes of chance, temptation, death, and moral corruption.

Painted in a period marked by Beckmann's displacement following the Nazi campaign against Degenerate art, the work reflects both the artist's inner exile and the surrounding political violence of World War II. Scholars have interpreted the painting as an allegory of vanitas, a reflection on human desire and mortality, and a coded commentary on the mechanisms of power and complicity under the Nazi regime.

Since 1956, the painting has been part of the collection of the Staatsgalerie Stuttgart, where it is regarded as one of Beckmann’s most complex and allegorical works from his Amsterdam period.

== Description ==
The composition of the painting presents a dense interior, resembling a casino scene filled with symbolic tension and moral ambiguity.

In the foreground, three women of different ages are depicted: a young woman in a red dress gazes toward the horizon, accompanied by an older woman dressed in black and a middle-aged figure whose face is partially turned aside. Behind them stand three croupiers, handling sword-like objects on the gaming table, creating a ritualistic sense of movement that combines the atmosphere of gambling and violence. In the background, two masked figures advance toward the table, holding spherical, flaming objects that scholars interpret as bombs or metaphors for impending destruction.

The color palette is dominated by deep red, black, and ochre tones, with strong contours and compressed spatial depth characteristic of Beckmann’s late style.

According to Susanne Kienlechner, the figures embody the decline of European civilization in the early years of the Second World War, in which "Beckmann’s casino becomes a metaphor for the moral corruption of society under existential threat".

While the composition draws inspiration from the real Casino de Monte-Carlo, which Beckmann visited in 1939, the painting transforms that setting into a chaotic and allegorical vision of judgment and moral collapse, rather than a depiction of leisure.

== Background ==
In 1933 Max Beckmann was dismissed from his teaching position at the Städelschule in Frankfurt, he initially moved to Berlin with his wife. In 1937, following the Nazi campaign against so-called Degenerate art, he went into exile in Amsterdam. Cut off from the German art world and living under the growing shadow of the Second World War, Beckmann produced some of his most complex and symbolic paintings during this period.

Between 1939 and 1943, he worked on Traum von Monte Carlo, inspired by his visit to the Casino de Monte-Carlo shortly before the outbreak of war. Although the subject appears at first to be a glamorous gambling scene, Beckmann reimagined it as a moral allegory, a reflection on decadence, mortality, and the collapse of European civilization under totalitarianism.

Scholars such as Stephan Reimertz and Susanne Kienlechner interpret the painting as part of Beckmann’s broader artistic response to persecution and exile. Created amid censorship, war, and personal uncertainty, the work marks a turning point in his artistic development, from realist observer to allegorical visionary.

== Provenance ==
After its completion in 1943, Traum von Monte Carlo remained in Max Beckmann's possession during his exile in Amsterdam.

Following the end of the Second World War, the painting was included in postwar retrospectives of Beckmann’s work and eventually sold to a Helmuth Lütjens, a German art dealer, in 1945. In 1956, it was acquired by the Staatsgalerie Stuttgart, where it has remained ever since as part of the museum’s permanent collection.

The work has been exhibited in numerous Beckmann retrospectives in Germany and abroad, often representing the artist’s late allegorical period.

== Identification of the figures ==
The woman lying at the gaming table in the foreground has been interpreted in the literature as a depiction of Hildegard Melms, known as "Naïla". She was a former lover of Beckmann and one of his muses, whom he portrayed several times, including in 1923. According to art historian Dietrich Schubert, her resemblance in Traum von Monte Carlo is "somewhat exaggerated or caricatured, transformed into a worldly bar-lioness".

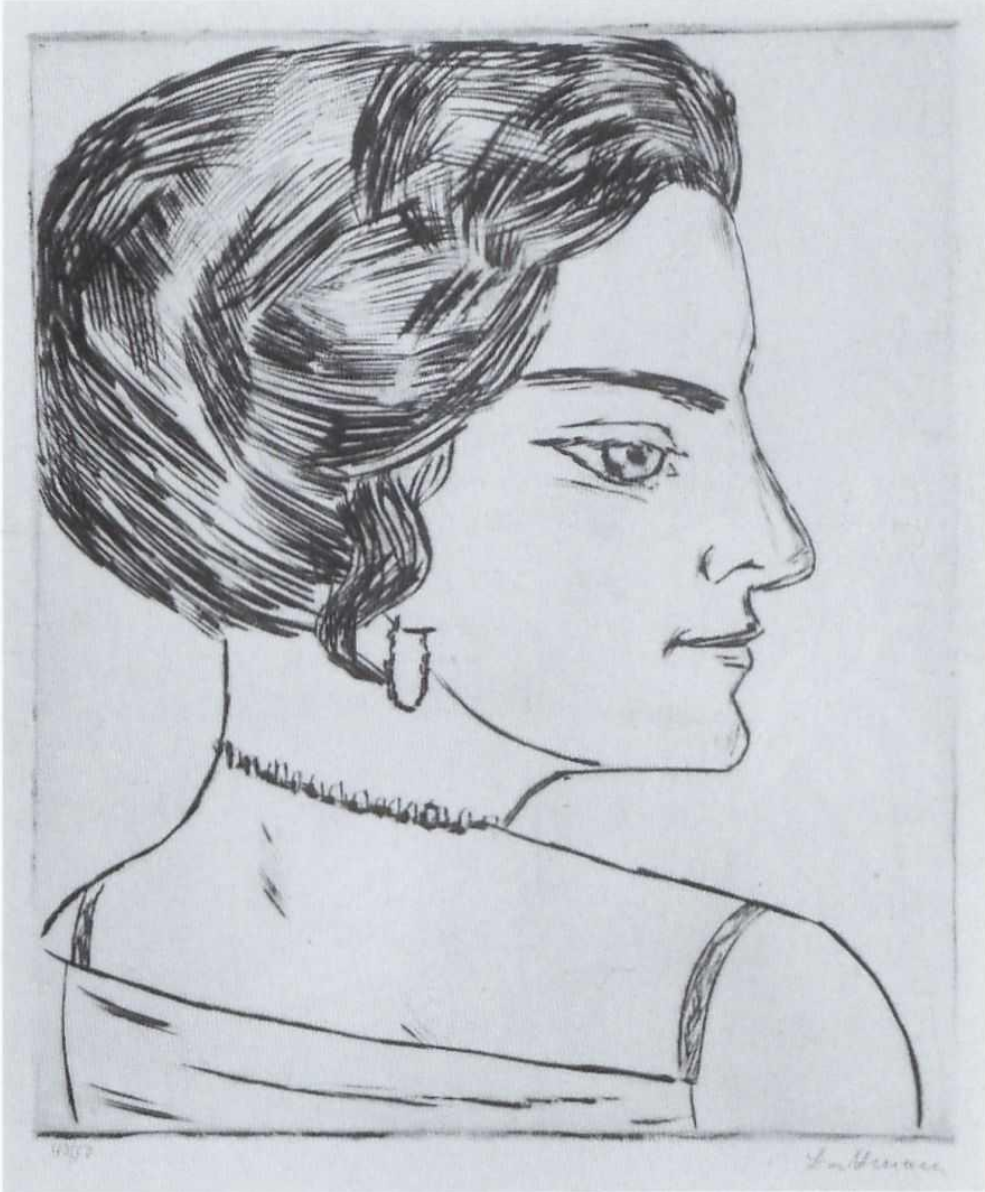
Naïla (Etching from 1923)

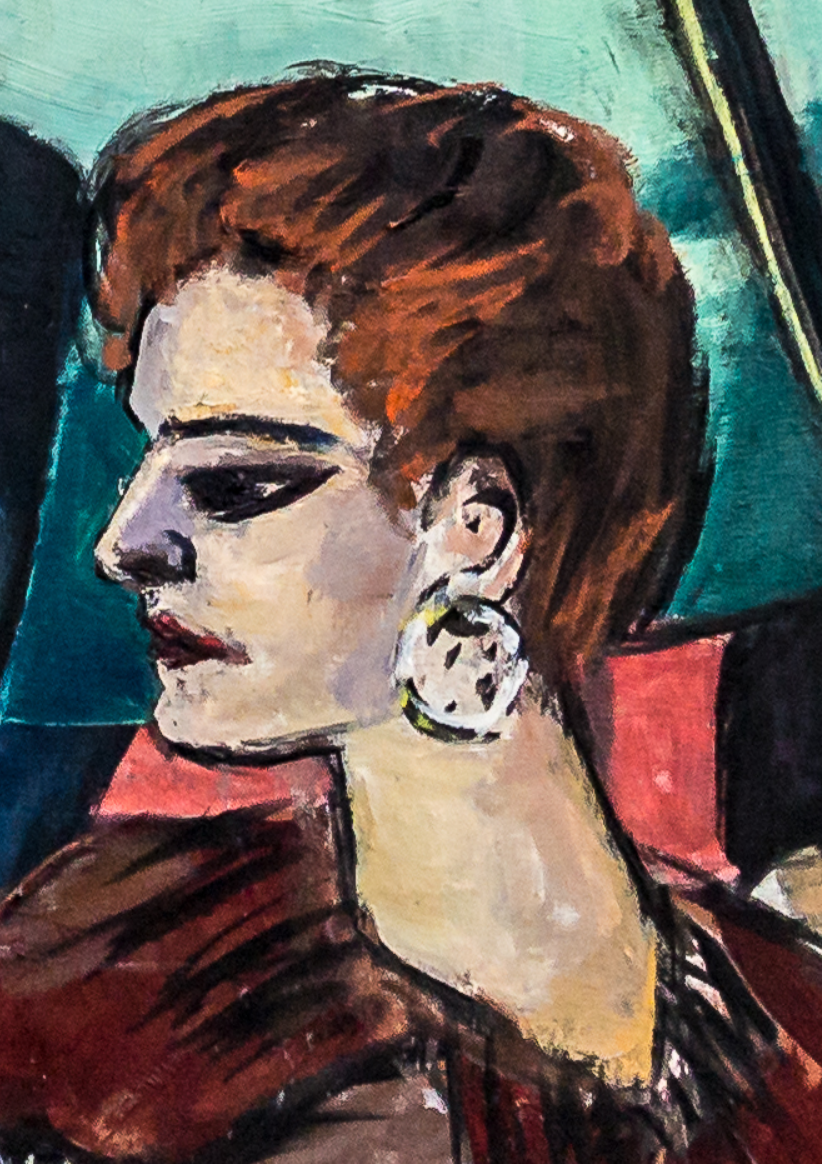
Head of the woman in red

Beckmann’s biographer Stephan Reimertz saw in the elderly woman Béatrice Ephrussi de Rothschild. From this central figure emanates, in his words, "a certain loneliness"; one might imagine her leaving her villa in Cap Ferrat "to gamble away a fortune". She was indeed a frequent visitor to the Monte Carlo casino.

Art historian Christian Lenz instead identifies the elderly lady as Ida Concordia Minna Tube, Beckmann’s former mother-in-law. Beckmann valued "her generosity of mind and humanity", and for him she was a kind of seer, one who could see through reality.

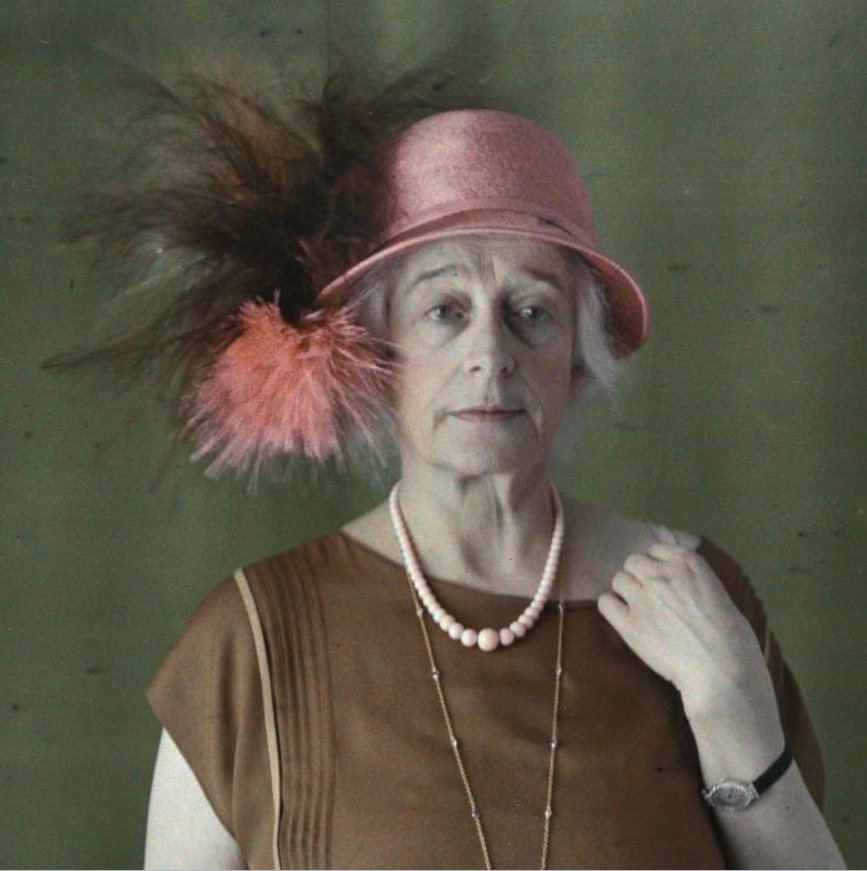
Béatrice Ephrussi de Rothschild (Photo from 1923)

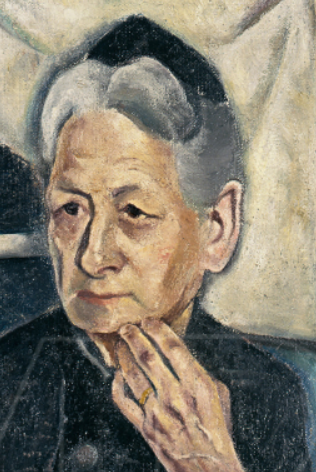
Ida Concordia Minna Tube (Beckmann 1919)

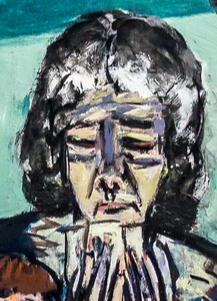
Head of the elderly woman in the center
(detail)

Art historians Christian Fuhrmeister, Susanne Kienlechner and Jonathan Petropoulos identify the left croupier as Erhard Göpel.

According to art historian Eugen Blume, Beckmann was fully aware of Göpel's ambivalent role; he is said to have held a mirror up to the art dealer, who had made a "Faustian pact with the devil".

His colleague Christian Lenz strongly disagreed with Blume's interpretation.

No scholarly consensus has emerged regarding the nature of Beckmann's relationship with Göpel. After Beckmann's death, Göpel became the leading expert on his work and, together with his wife Barbara Göpel, compiled the artist's catalogue raisonné.

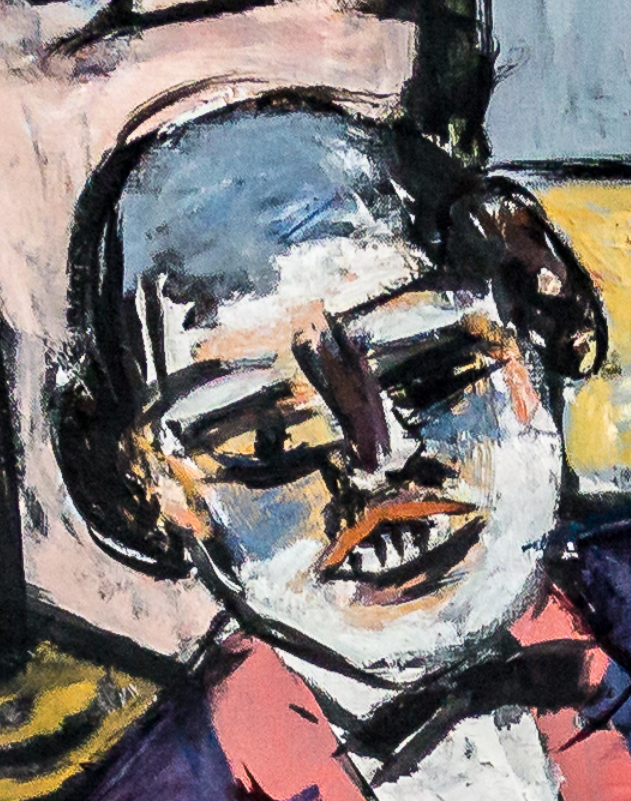
Head of the right croupier (detail)

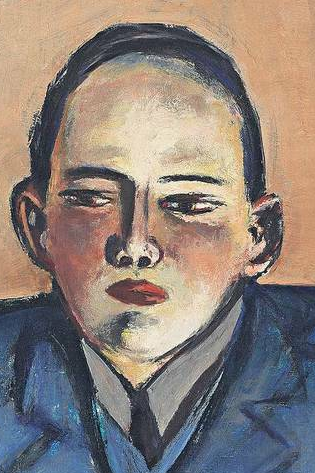
Erhard Göpel (Beckmann, 1944)

The right-hand croupier has been identified by Fuhrmeister, Kienlechner and Petropoulos as Bruno Lohse, an art historian involved in the Nazi art looting in France through the Einsatzstab Reichsleiter Rosenberg. The red patches on his hands were interpreted by Kienlechner as symbols of bloody deeds. Though Beckmann likely never met Lohse personally, Kienlechner argues that the painter probably knew of him through Frieda von Kaulbach-Schytte, the mother of Beckmann's wife Quappi, who had close ties to the art dealer Maria Almas-Dietrich, a collaborator of Lohse and confidant of Hitler.

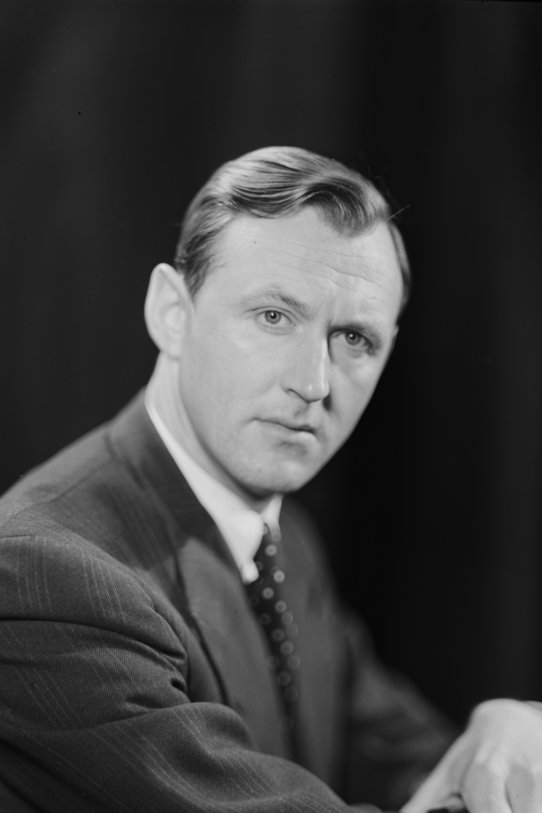
Art thief Bruno Lohse (Photo from the 1940s)

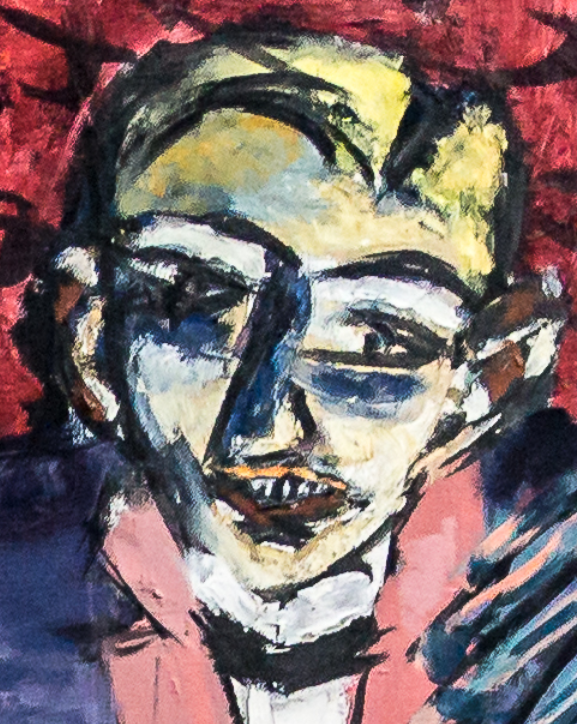
Head of the right croupier
(detail)

The crouching croupier is believed by filmmakers Hugo Macgregor and Claire Guillon to represent Pierre Bonny.

Bonny, a policeman and member of the French Carlingue (Gestapo), was a notorious torturer who assisted Lohse in seizing the Schloss Collection.

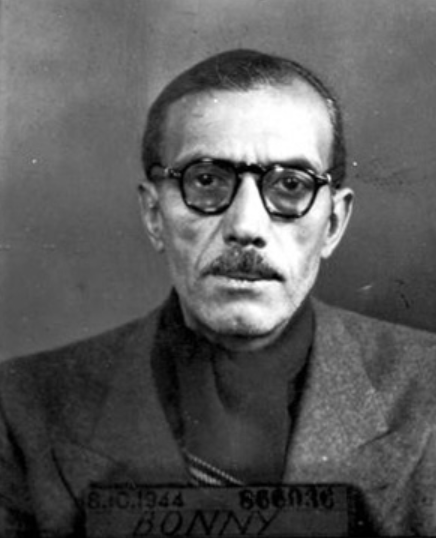
Pierre Bonny Policeman and Robber (Photo from 1944)

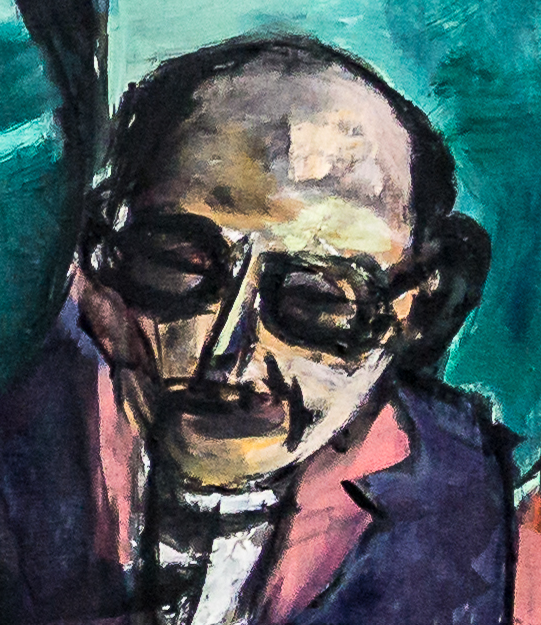
Head of the crouching croupier
(detail)

The man holding the burning candle at the far left has been consistently identified as Rudolf von Simolin, an industrialist, art collector and lover of literature and pleasure. He owned about fifteen Beckmann works, alongside paintings by Paul Cézanne, Vincent van Gogh, Edvard Munch, Eugène Delacroix, Ferdinand Hodler, Max Liebermann and others. Before his exile, Beckmann was a frequent guest at Schloss Seeseiten on Lake Starnberg, which Simolin had made his residence in 1922. The patron, who suffered from poliomyelitis, remained skeptical of National Socialism.

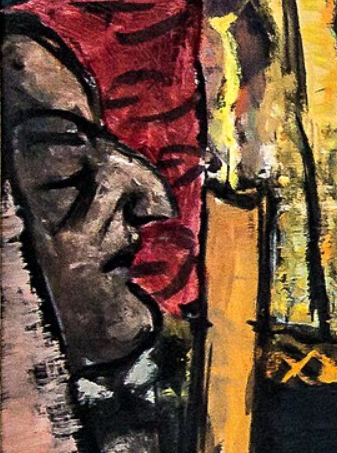
Head of the officer on the left (detail)

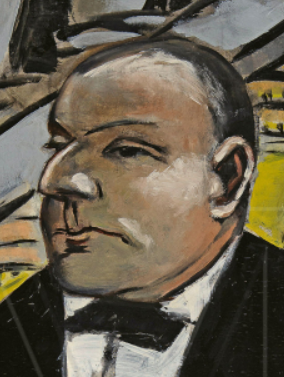
Patron Rudolf von Simolin (Beckmann, 1931)

Fuhrmeister and Kienlechner identify the two masked figures as Dutch resistance fighters Willem Arondeus and Gerrit van der Veen, who, together with others, carried out the attack on the Amsterdam population registry on 27 March 1943, one day before Beckmann completed Traum von Monte Carlo.

This interpretation directly links the painting to the Dutch resistance movement. Although Beckmann knew several individuals associated with the resistance, he kept aloof from political activity during his exile. "Politics" Beckmann wrote to Stephan Lackner on 19 January 1938, "is a subaltern matter".

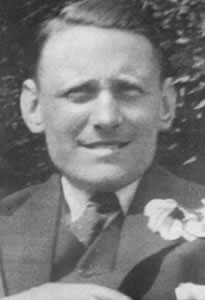
Willem Arondeus

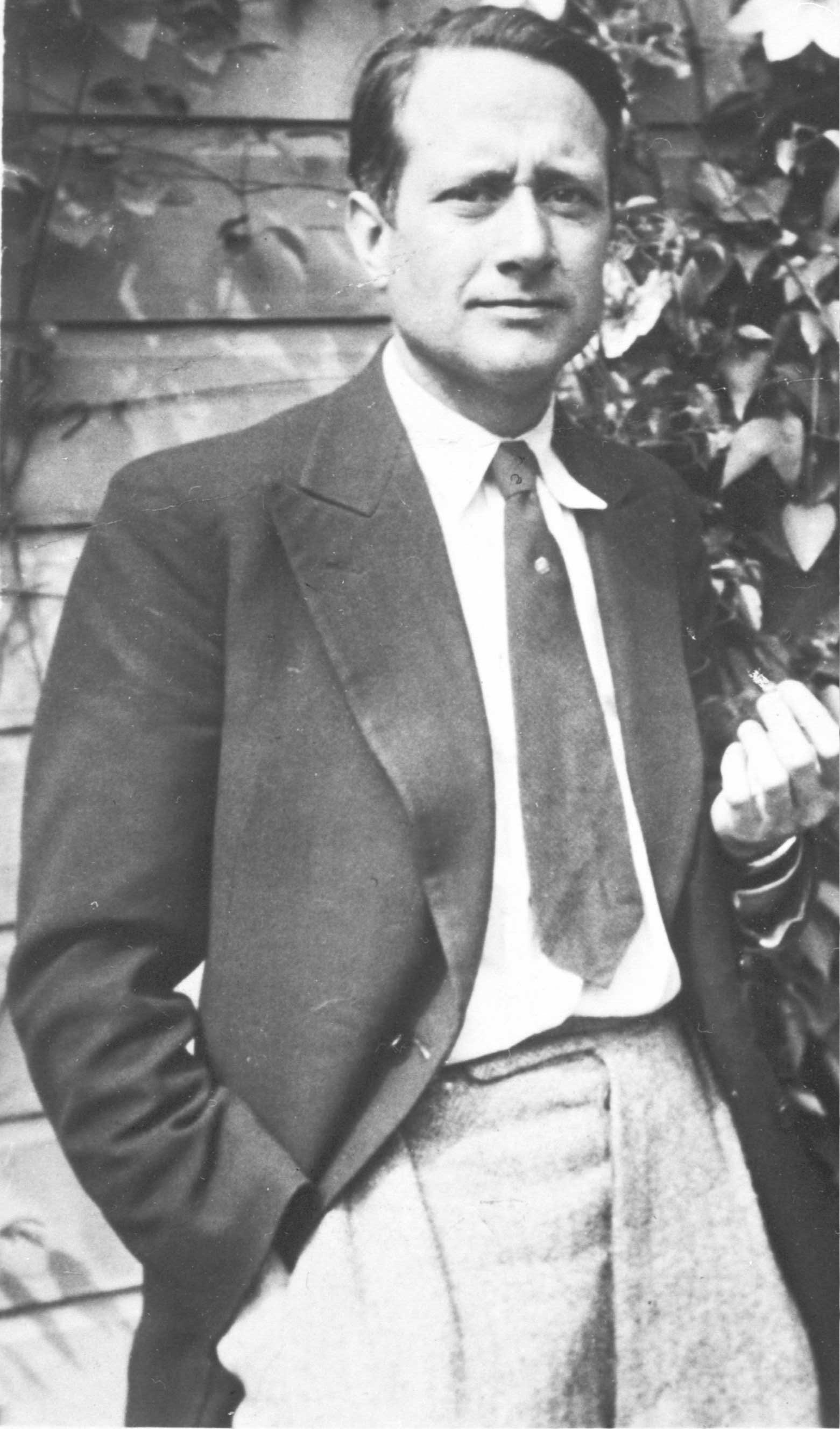
Gerrit van der Veen

== Bibliography ==
- Cirigliano II, Michael (27 September 2016). "Artists in Exile: Paul Hindemith and Max Beckmann - The Metropolitan Museum of Art".
- Kallir Research Institute (2025). "Max Beckmann - Biography | Kallir Research Institute".
- Kienlechner, Susanne (2021). "Max Beckmann (1884–1950): Traum von Monte Carlo, 1943. Eine Analyse im Hinblick auf die zeitgeschichtlichen Ereignisse" (PDF). ART-Dok: Publikationsplattform Kunstgeschichte (in German). Heidelberg University Library. doi:10.11588/artdok.000076091 (inactive 16 December 2025).
- Reimertz, Stephan (2003). Max Beckmann. Biographie (in German). Munich: Luchterhand. p. 326. "During a visit to Cap Martin and the Casino de Monte-Carlo in April 1939, Beckmann sketched gamblers and croupiers on hotel stationery, later transforming the scene into one of his most complex allegories."
- Fuhrmeister, Christian; Kienlechner, Susanne (2011). Christian Fuhrmeister (ed.). Max Beckmann und der Widerstand in den Niederlanden [Max Beckmann – von Angesicht zu Angesicht] (PDF) (in German). et al. Leipzig: Hatje Cantz. pp. 339–358. "The authors connect Beckmann's Amsterdam paintings, including Traum von Monte Carlo, to his sense of moral resistance and coded political commentary against the brutality of the Nazi regime, noting how symbols of chance and violence mirror contemporary fears under occupation."
