= Göbl =

Göbl or Goebl is a German surname. Notable people with the surname include:

- Hanns Goebl (1901–1986), German sculptor
- Margret Göbl (1938–2013), German pair skater
- Otto Göbl (1936–2009), German bobsledder

== See also ==
- Goble (disambiguation)
