= Butter-churn tower =

Two-part defensive tower

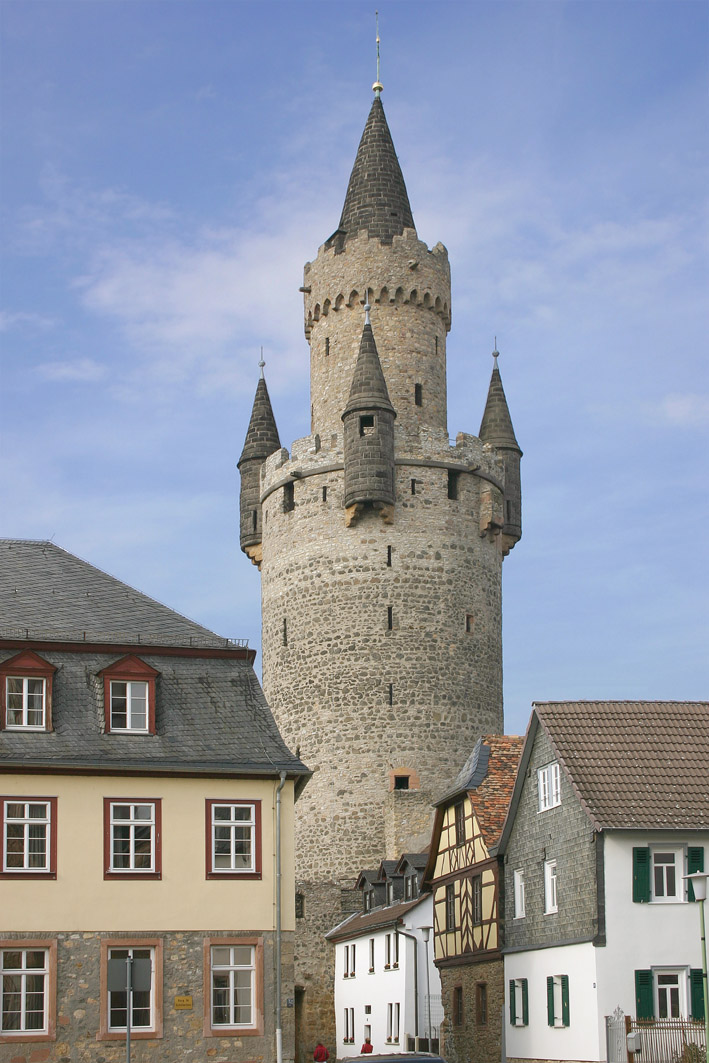
The Adolf Tower in Friedberg in butter-churn style with its bartizans

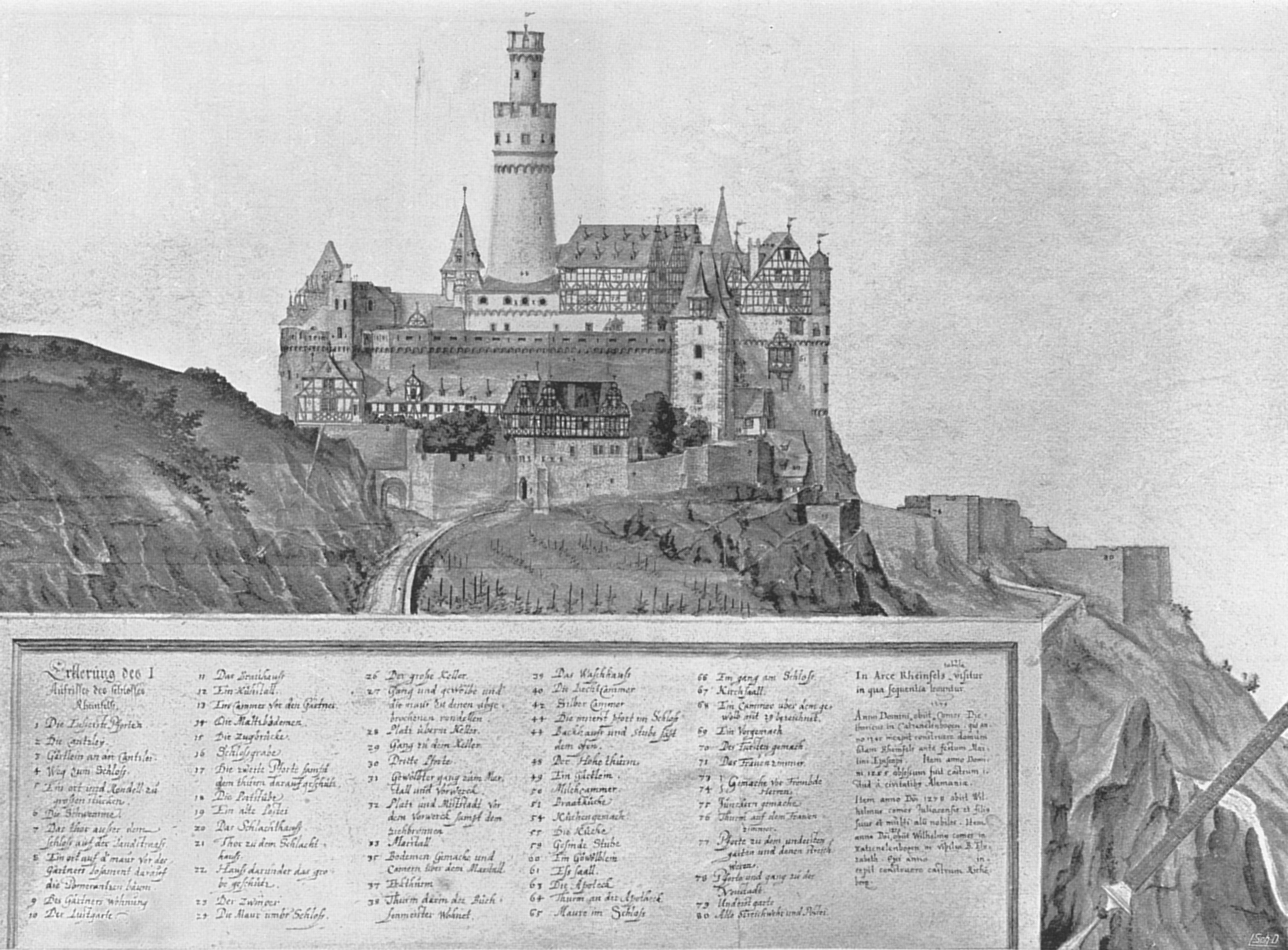
The highest butter-churn tower - the bergfried at Rheinfels Castle, 1607

A butter-churn tower (German: Butterfassturm) is a two-part defensive tower in which the upper section has a smaller width than the lower section.

This design provides a ledge or fighting platform about half-way up that acts as a chemin de ronde whilst the narrower tower that rises from this platform acts as a raised observation point. The two sections of the tower are usually cylindrical, but in rarer cases butter-churn towers may have a square plan. Its name derives from its shape which is similar to that of an upright butter churn: a cylindrical container with a shorter, narrower top section.

The design appeared in the 14th century, being especially employed for the bergfriede of castles in Europe, but also for wall towers or watch towers on city walls. Its fighting or defensive value was not much greater than ordinary defensive towers, but it offered better observation over a greater distance. The construction of butter-churn towers may have been more symbolic than strategic.

In the late Middle Ages many butter-churn towers were erected in the Middle Rhine-South Hesse-Taunus region. Examples include those in Bad Homburg (the White Tower), Friedberg (the Adolfsturm), Idstein (the Witches' Tower and the bergfried of Idstein Castle) and Oberwesel (the "Oxen Tower"). The Marksburg above Braubach am Rhein had a square bergfried to which was added a small butter-churn turret in 1468. This burned down in 1705 and was replaced in 1905.

One of the tallest towers is the 56 metres (184 ft) high Round Tower, the symbol of the town of Andernach, which dates to 1453 and has an unusual variation: an octagonal upper turret with a stone gable roof. The highest bergfried of a hill castle with a butter-churn top (1370) was that of Rheinfels Castle above Sankt Goar am Rhein which was 54 metres (177 ft) high at the intermediate platform, but was destroyed in 1797. The third-highest surviving bergfried in Germany is at the Osterburg near Weida in Thuringia; it is 53 metres (174 ft) high and also designed as a butter-churn tower. It is also one of the oldest surviving bergfrieds, dating to 1193. It measures 24 metres (79 ft) to the platform and has an octagonal, stone conical roof dating to the 15th century.

== Literature ==
- Horst Wolfgang Böhme, Reinhard Friedrich, Barbara Schock-Werner (eds.): Wörterbuch der Burgen, Schlösser und Festungen. Reclam-Verlag, Stuttgart, 2004; ISBN 3-15-010547-1, pp. 103−105.
- Otto Piper, Burgenkunde. Weltbild-Verlag, Augsburg, 1994; ISBN 3-89350-554-7, p. 217.
