= WRSE =

Defunct student radio station at Elmhurst University in Illinois

- Elmhurst, Illinois; United States
- Broadcast area: DuPage County, Illinois
- Frequency: 88.7 MHz
- Branding: WRSE-FM, Elmhurst

Programming
- Affiliations: Intercollegiate Broadcasting System

Ownership
- Owner: Elmhurst University; (Board of Trustees)

History
- First air date: 1962
- Last air date: 2026
- Former call signs: WRSE-FM (1962–2001)
- Call sign meaning: Wired Radio Station Elmhurst, reflecting early years as a carrier-current station

Technical information
- Licensing authority: FCC
- Facility ID: 4299
- Class: A
- ERP: 320 watts
- HAAT: 29 meters (95 ft)
- Transmitter coordinates: 41°53′46.00″N 87°56′45.00″W

Links
- Public license information: Public file; LMS

WRSE (88.7 FM) was a student-run college radio station at Elmhurst University in Elmhurst, Illinois, a western suburb of Chicago. It began as a carrier-current service in 1947 and signed on as an FM station in 1962. Elmhurst University surrendered its license in May 2026, and the FCC cancelled the license and deleted the call sign on May 26.

== History ==
WRSE began broadcasting during Elmhurst's 1947 Homecoming as a carrier-current service that was heard in campus dormitories. The FCC granted a construction permit in 1962 for a 10-watt noncommercial station at 88.7 MHz, and WRSE-FM began broadcasting on December 7, 1962.

After two years of planning and renovations, WRSE opened a modernized main studio in the basement of the Frick Center in August 2012. The project added a new soundboard and phone system and digitized the station's music collection; at the time, WRSE transmitted with 320 watts.

Elmhurst University surrendered WRSE's broadcast license in May 2026. The FCC cancelled the license and deleted the call sign on May 26.
