= Göbel =

Göbel is a surname of Germanic origin. Persons with this name include:

- Barbara Göbel (born 1943), German swimmer
- Bert Göbel (born 1963), German swimmer
- Christoph Göbel (born 1989), German footballer
- Frans Göbel (born 1959), Dutch rower
- Heinrich Göbel (1818–1893), German inventor
- Karl Göbel (1900–1945), German General during World War II
- Kristoffer Göbel (born 1978), Swedish vocalist
- Just Göbel (1891–1984), Dutch footballer
- Patrick Göbel (born 1993), German footballer
- Peter Göbel (born 1941), German skater
- Tim Göbel (born 1982), German sprinter

== See also ==
- Gobel, a surname
- Goebel, a surname
- Göpel, a surname
