= Ronald Goetz =

American theologian and writer

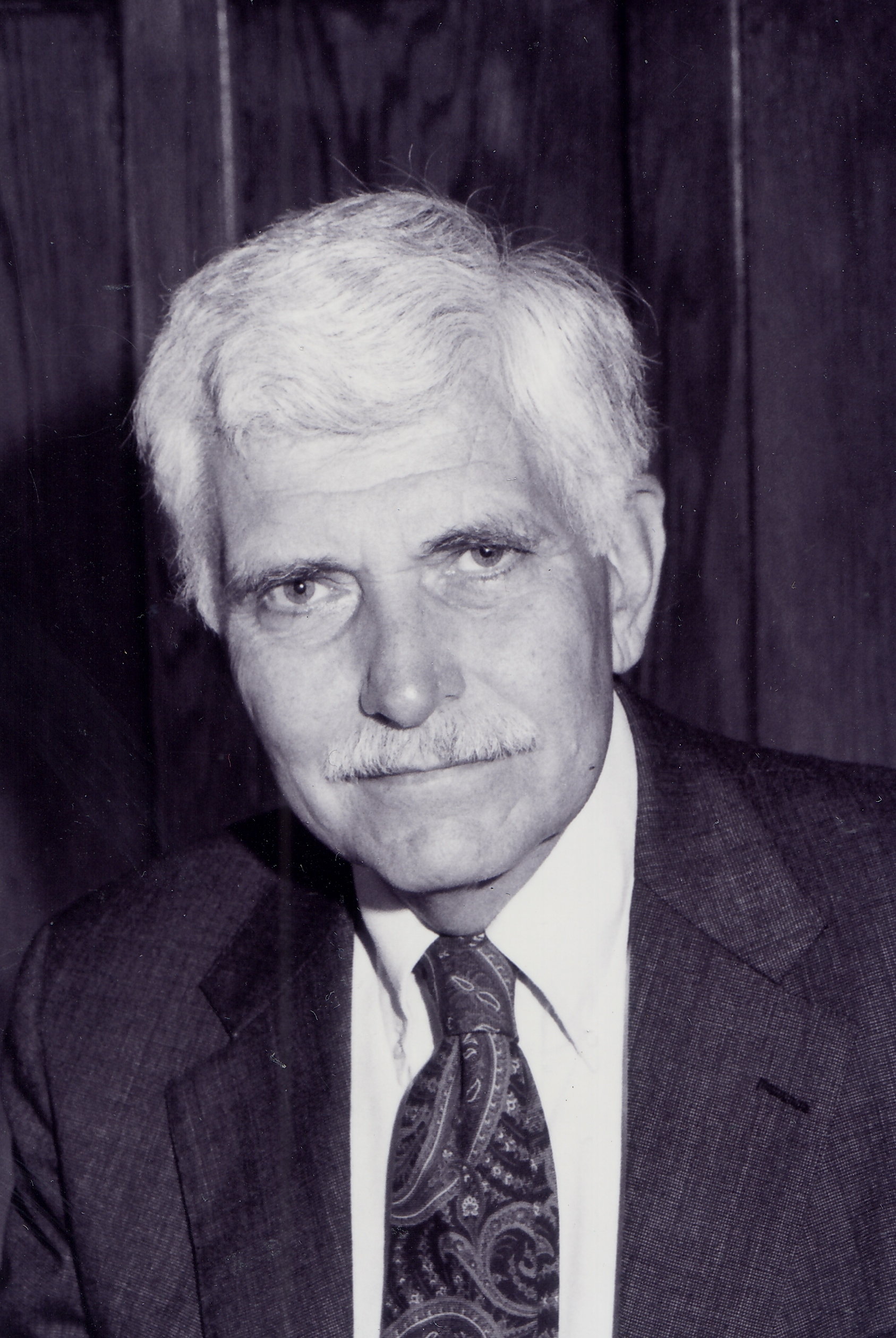
- Born: 1933; Chicago, Illinois, U.S.
- Died: 2006 (aged 72–73)
- Education: Harvard Divinity School; Northwestern University

Ronald Goetz (1933–2006) was a theologian, professor, pastor, and author who held the Niebuhr Distinguished Chair in Christian Theology and Ethics at Elmhurst College from 1986 until 1999.

== Background and education ==
Goetz was born and raised in Chicago, Illinois. He earned his B.S. from Northwestern University (1955), his B.D. from Harvard Divinity School (1958), and his M.A. and Ph.D. from Northwestern University (1962, 1966).

== Career ==
Goetz served as pastor of Rosetta Baptist Church, Little York, Illinois from 1957 to 1958. After completing his M.A., he served as pastor of Evanston Mennonite Church, Evanston, Illinois from 1960 to 1963. In 1966 he received his Ph.D. and in 1963 he joined the faculty of Elmhurst College in Elmhurst, Illinois. From 1969 until his retirement, Goetz was Editor-at-Large of the Christian Century to which he was a frequent contributor. In 1983 he was named Staley Distinguished Christian Scholar at Goshen College in Goshen, Indiana. In 1986, he was elevated to the Niebuhr Distinguished Chair of Theology and Ethics at Elmhurst College, a position he held until his retirement in 1999. Upon his retirement, a Festschrift was written in his honor. Goetz served as president of the Karl Barth Society of North America and of the American Theological Society.

== Work and thought ==
Goetz's academic work focused primarily on the Christian doctrine of the atonement. Beginning in 1975 and continuing over more than two decades, he published articles and delivered lectures questioning key elements of traditional atonement theories while developing his own counterproposal. Goetz believed that the three historic theories of the atonement — the Ransom (Christus Victor), Substitutionary, and Moral Influence theories — are no longer sustainable, in part because they were formulated against the background of an obsolete, pre-Darwinian anthropology. Each of these theories, as well as their modern corollaries, assumes in some sense that primordial human sin disrupted and disfigured an originally peaceful and perfectly ordered creation, and that human sin is therefore responsible for introducing suffering, death, and evil into God's world. In this view, the need for atonement between God and humanity (an act of reparation that leads to or effects reconciliation) arises solely due to human sin. Goetz argued that the findings of modern science as well recent breakthroughs in theological and biblical scholarship discredit such ideas as well as any atonement theories that presuppose them. Instead, Goetz proposed that God created the world as it is, imperfect, impermanent and incomplete, with all its suffering and violence, as an integral component in the realization of God's eschatological purpose for creation. Goetz's atonement theory therefore emphasized not just human responsibility, but ultimate divine responsibility for the present shape of the world, including its sin, death, suffering and evil. The need for atonement between God and humans, then, arises not just on the human side—because of sin—but also on God's side, because of what God has permitted human beings and creation to endure in pursuing God's purpose. Goetz's theory, in a sharp departure from traditional and contemporary theories, posits that the atonement effected in the life and death of the Son of God is bilateral or reciprocal. Jesus Christ makes atonement (on humanity's side) for sin; he makes atonement (on God's side) for the unmerited suffering of the world.
