= Round Tower, Andernach =

Defensive tower in Andernach, Germany

Coordinates: 50°26′27″N 7°23′46″E

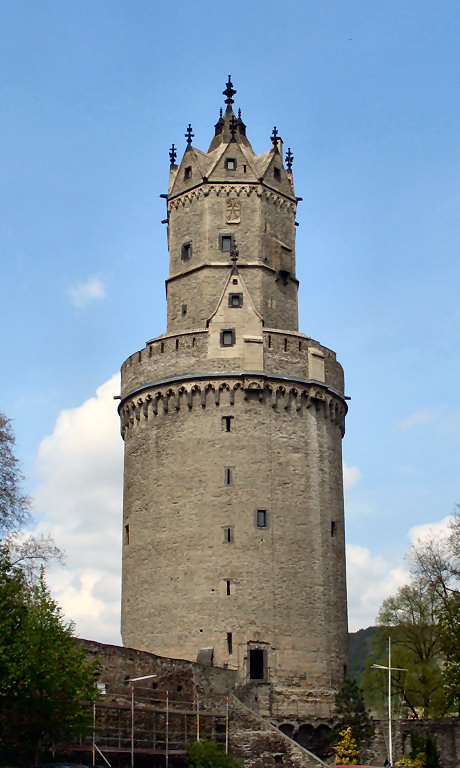
The Round Tower in Andernach from the south-southeast, 2005

The Round Tower (German: Runder Turm) is a large defensive tower in Andernach, Germany, the town's keep and schauinsland (literally "look into the country"). The castle and the town walls were called that because they provided a far look into the surrounding country to see enemy troops approaching in time. It dates to the 15th century, and was a former watch tower in the town fortifications at the northwest corner of the medieval town wall.

== History ==
The tower was built under the direction of the town council of Andernach in the period before 1440 (round lower section, first mention in the construction records) and from 1448 to 1453 (octagonal upper section) as a fortified watch tower within the town fortifications and known as the Rondentorne. It was probably erected on the site of the northwest corner tower of the Roman castellum or another, smaller, earlier structure. The builder in charge of the second phase of construction was municipal master builder, Philipp Preudemann (Philips Preudeman). Whether he also acted as the architect is not known. Over the course of its history, the name of the tower varied from ronder thurn in the 17th century, Runder Thurmin the 18th/19th century and then Runder Turm thereafter. Master carpenter Johann was responsible for all the woodwork, including the installation and removal of the treadwheel operated cranes; Master Engel (Enggel) was the local smith. All the ropes and cables came from the workshop of Klaus von Mendig (Claise van Mendich) and Christian von Düsseldorf (Kirstgain van Duysseldorp). Other masters named were Heinrich Schönbel (Henrich Schoinboil), Arnold von Lieser (Arnolden van Leser) and Johann Meyener. Even one name of the otherwise unnamed journeymen, workers, servants and assistants has been recorded: "In derselven wochen hait geoppert Peter Attenderngin 3 dage, y den dag 6 schillinge, macht 1 mark 6 schillinge." ("In the same week (the week 3–8 September 1453) Peter Attendernchen had worked for 3 days as an odd-job man, each day for 6 shillings, which makes 1 mark, 6 shillings").

The outside tower walls used to be plastered and coloured with a whitish to dark yellowish (ochre) paint to underline the architectonic structure. Rests of the plaster and paint could be found until the mid-19th century. According to recent findings, the cylindrical substructure may have been started well before 1440, i.e. as early as 1412 to 1415 (according to Dr Manfred Huiskes). There are indications of this in the detailed master builder's accounts of this period, which have been handed down, about lively building activity on a new tower of an unnamed position. After that, the round substructure that gave the tower its name could have stood for 30 years without an extension. A roof repair on the tower in 1442 after storm damage indicates a very advanced or finished tower and thus an earlier start of construction before 1440, in addition to the differences in the design of the friezes and embrasures of the substructure to the superstructure as well as the lack of stonemason's marks there. Only rectangular embrasures were used in the substructure, while so-called keyhole embrasures were also used in the top. After some work in 1446, the tower was further built in 1448 with the octagonal tower. For this purpose, a construction double gantry crane was moved onto the finished tower base and used until 1452. In 1453, the last year of construction, a Göpelwerk at the foot of the tower transported the last materials upwards. With the laying of the tuff slabs of the roof, the main work was completed (around 15 November 1453).

The mighty defence tower was certainly intended as a municipal and civic counterpart to the erzbischöfliche kurkölnische Burg in the southeast, a clear symbol of renewed civic consciousness, also in view of the citizens' uprisings against the elector from 1357 to 1367. This was underlined by its position in the western city wall 50 metres north of the former Kölnpforte, through which the respective elector was only allowed to enter the city according to protocol. Despite a strained financial situation, the funds were raised by the citizenry, i.e. not only by the ruling class, but by a large number of the citizens, deliberately without a contribution from the reigning Cologne Archbishop Dietrich II of Moers. Because of the political and financial pressure the archbishop was under (including the mortgaging of the city, Soester Fehde 1444-1449 and others), the timing was favourable in this power vacuum.

Its enormous height of 56 metres, which allowed a wide view of the Rhine valley, and the presence of a turmer (tower piper), especially in the 15th, 16th and 17th centuries, ensured that the tower was constantly on guard. In addition to guarding and fire watch duties, the turmer also "blew" (reported) incoming ships for Rhine customs duty. A preserved council record from 24 August 1515 shows how the new tower guard named Blasius was introduced into office. In addition to the right to live with his mother, two wagons of firewood and the clothing of a town servant, he received a Goldflorin salary per year. He had to carry the tower key with him at all times. Several hook rifles, field snakes were placed on the upper floors or on the battlements, and other defensive material (oil, pitch, stones, powder) was stored in the rooms. During this time, the chamber in the base (dungeon, "deustere kamer") functioned as a prison. The most famous inmate was the nobleman Gerlach Hausmann von Namedy in 1509, the most powerful man in the town at the end of the 15th century, Schöffe from 1477 to 1509 and mayor several times, who was always elected for only one year at that time.

Its role as a defence tower became clear in the Truchsessian or Cologne War of 1583-1589 against the Elector Gebhard of Waldburg-Trauchburg, Truchsess of Waldburg, who had converted to Protestantism, and whose troops tried in vain to enter the city fighting on the Catholic side through the Cologne Gate.

In the night of 30 April to 1 May 1689, the tower withstood an attempted blast by the retreating French troops of Ludwig XIV, thus demonstrating its stability. What remained was an excavation on the western field side of the tower about 1.20 m deep and the size of a small car. In the following period, parts of the tower slowly deteriorated, pieces of the wall broke out of the parapet of the battlements. Around the middle of the 19th century, the tower was also to be demolished in the course of major wall demolitions, to which the "Kölner Pforte" (Cologne Gate) and the "Kirchspforte" (Church Gate) and "Schafspforte" (Sheep Gate) fell victim, but this was prevented.

In 1880, major renovation work was carried out, and the old city coats of arms made of tuff were replaced with new ones, although they were inserted vertically instead of at an angle and unpainted. On 17 August 1922, the youth hostel, previously housed in the keep of the town castle from 1911 to 1922, was established in the Round Tower.

On 11 March 1945, during the last days of the Second World War, the stone helmet was damaged by shelling, but further damage was averted. It was not until 1952 that the damage was repaired. Instead of the flagpole, a cross flower made of Mendig basalt, weighing twenty hundredweights, was placed on top of the helmet, as it was possibly also used as a roof attachment in 1453; the cross flowers on the eight gables and four dormers were also renewed.

In 2003, the large tower, as a place of remembrance of the town and its history, received a very extensive renovation for its 550th anniversary (including parapet and floor covering of the battlement, battlement house, outer masonry) and now appears in new splendour. On the occasion of the anniversary, a special exhibition "550 Years of the Round Tower" was held in the City Museum from 18 May to 7 December 2003, and a booklet in glossy print on the subject was published.

In July 2010, Hall 1 (boys' hall, lowest floor in the octagonal tower) of the former youth hostel was refurbished as a youth hostel museum room.

== Literature ==
- Peter Adams: Kurzgefaßte Geschichte der Stadt Andernach. Andernach, 1955.
- Werner Bornheim gen. Schilling: Stadt und Stadtmauer am Mittelrhein. In: Die kleine Stadt: Gestaltung der rheinischen Klein- und Mittelstädte. Rheinischer Verein für Denkmalpflege und Landschaftsschutz, Neuß, 1960
- Paul Clemen (ed.): Die Kunstdenkmäler der Rheinprovinz - Kreis Mayen. 1. Halbband, Düsseldorf, 1941, 171 f.
- Georg Dehio: Handbuch der Deutschen Kunstdenkmäler (Rheinland-Pfalz und Saarland). Deutscher Kunstverlag, Munich, 1972
- Franz-Josef Heyen (ed.): 2000 Jahre Andernach. Geschichte einer rheinischen Stadt. Stadtverwaltung Andernach, 1988 (publ. on the 2,000th anniversary, no ISBN), 1994 (2nd rev. edn.)
- Victor Hugo: Le Rhin. Lettres à un ami. XIII. Paris, 1842
- Manfred Huiskes: Andernach im Mittelalter: Von den Anfängen bis zum Ende des 14. Jahrhunderts. L. Rohrscheid, Bonn, 1980; ISBN 3-7928-0441-7
- Hans Hunder: Andernach. Darstellungen zur Geschichte der Stadt. Stadtverwaltung Andernach, 1986
- Hans-Jürgen Krüger: Inventar des Archivs der Stadt Andernach. Bd. 7 – Rechnungen, Koblenz, 1986, pp. 387–408
- Barbara Lechler: Der Runde Turm. In: Tore und Türme. Stadtmuseum Andernach 1984, Heft 2, pp. 21–23
- Klaus Schäfer (ed.): 550 Jahre Runder Turm. Begleitheft zur Sonderausstellung im Stadtmuseum Andernach vom 18. Mai bis 7. Dezember 2003 (= Andernacher Beiträge 18), Andernach, 2003; ISBN 3-9807996-1-1
- Ottheinz Schindler, Manfred Huiskes: Andernach (Innenstadt) In: Rheinische Kunststätten. Heft 8, 2nd edn., Cologne, 1979, pp. 21 f.; ISBN 3-88094-277-3
