= Goebel =

Goebel is a surname. Notable people with the surname include:

- Brad Goebel (born 1969), professional American football player
- Ed Goebel (1898–1959), Major League Baseball player
- Evandro Goebel (born 1986), Brazilian footballer
- Florian Goebel (1972–2008), German astrophysicist
- Günter Goebel (1917–1993), German officer during World War II
- Joey Goebel (born 1980), American author
- Justus Goebel (1860–1919), American politician
- Karl Ritter von Goebel (1855–1932), German botanist
- Louis S. Goebel (1839–1915), New York politician
- Paul G. Goebel (1901–1988), American football player
- Peter Goebel, president of Elmhurst College
- Reinhard Goebel (born 1952), German conductor and violinist
- Timothy Goebel (born 1980), American figure skater
- Walther F. Goebel (1899—1993), American immunologist
- William Goebel (1856–1900), 34th Governor of Kentucky; assassinated

== See also ==
- Goebel Brewing Company, a brewing company in Detroit, Michigan from 1873–1964
- Goebel Soccer Complex, a sports facility in Evansville, Indiana
- Göbel, a surname
