= Elmhurst University =

Christian university in Elmhurst, Illinois, US

- Former names: Elmhurst Academy (1871–1919); Elmhurst Junior College (1919–1924); Elmhurst College (1924–2020)
- Motto: "In Lumine Tuo Videbimus Lumen" (Latin)
- Motto in English: "In Thy Light We Shall See Light"
- Type: Private university
- Established: 1871; 155 years ago
- Religious affiliation: United Church of Christ
- Endowment: $193.6 million (2025)
- President: Troy D. VanAken
- Students: 3,460
- Location: Elmhurst, Illinois, U.S. 41°53′46″N 87°56′46″W
- Campus: Suburban, 48 acres (0.19 km^{2})
- Colors: Blue & white
- Nickname: Bluejays
- Sporting affiliations: NCAA Division III – CCIW
- Mascot: Victor E. Bluejay
- Website: www.elmhurst.edu

Elmhurst University is a private university in Elmhurst, Illinois, United States. It has a tradition of service-oriented learning and an affiliation with the United Church of Christ. The university changed its name from Elmhurst College on July 1, 2020.

== History ==
=== From proseminary to university ===
In 1871, Jennie and Thomas Barbour Bryan gave land in Elmhurst to the German Evangelical Synod of the Northwest. This land was given for the purpose of establishing a school to prepare young men for the theological seminary and to train teachers for parochial schools, and was named the Elmhurst Proseminary. The first students, who were all male, studied Latin, Greek, English, German, music, history, geography, mathematics, science, and religion. All classes were taught in German. It wasn't until 1917 that the catalog was published in English. In 1919, the name was changed to the Elmhurst Academy and Junior College, and the expanded curriculum included courses in public speaking, physical education, economics, psychology, and the history of education. In 1924, the school was renamed Elmhurst College and became a four-year college for men. The college seal was designed in the 1920s by Robert Leonhardt, first registrar of the college, who also served as coach of the football team. Women first enrolled in 1930, and four years later, the college was accredited. The college began its graduate programs in 1998, and in 2012 the School for Professional Studies (SPS) was established to offer a wide range of online programs, including undergraduate degrees, graduate degrees and certificate programs. On June 15, 2019, the Elmhurst College Board of Trustees approved a name change to Elmhurst University, which took place July 1, 2020.

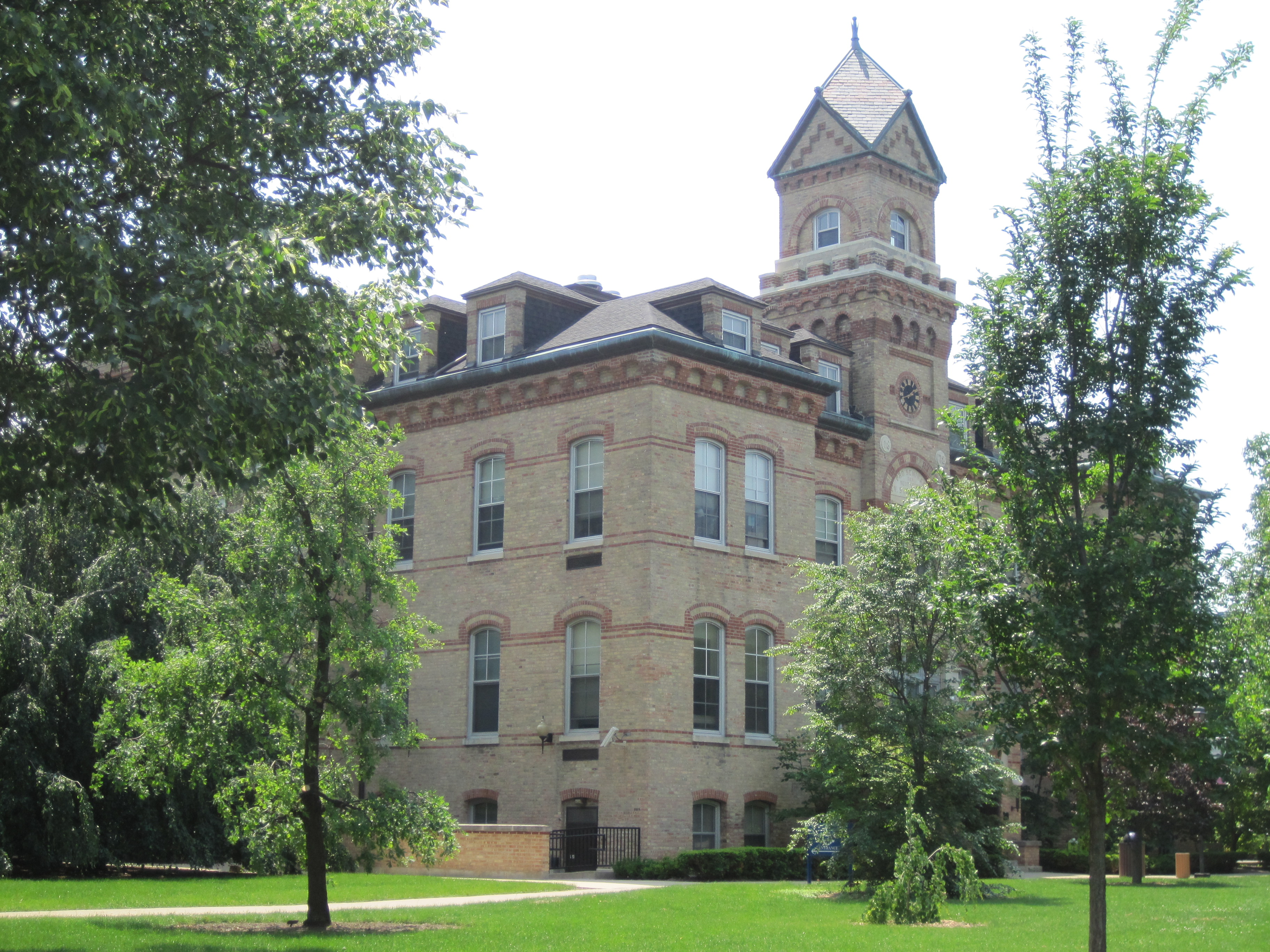
The Old Main building at Elmhurst University

The campus is 48 acres (19.4 ha) in Elmhurst, Illinois, a Chicago suburb. It is a certified Level 2 Arboretum and a member of Tree Campus USA, with more than 950 different species from around the globe.

=== Academic buildings and facilities ===
- The Frick Center houses lounges, a dining hall, E.C. Grille, Frick Center Café, the Game Room, the Spirit Shop (where university apparel and memorabilia is sold), the Central Printing and Mail Room, conference rooms, the university radio station WRSE-FM (88.7mHz) as well as The Niebuhr Center for Engagement and Reflection, whose stated mission is to provide engaging experiences and meaningful reflection for the community to cultivate a sense of purpose in life. The offices of the Student Government Association, Union Board, the Elms Yearbook, Student Affairs and Student Activities are also in the Frick Center. Built in 1964 and formerly known as the College Union Building, it was renamed in 1994 to honor the university's eleventh president, Dr. Ivan E. Frick and his wife Ruth Hudson Frick. The Frick Center also houses the Blume Board Room, named in honor of former board of trustees member and graduate Allen C. Blume (1955) and his wife Phyllis, as well as the Brune Patio, named in honor of graduate and benefactor Joan Brune (1951) as a gift to the university from her husband, graduate and benefactor Lester H. Brune (1948).
- The Barbara A. Kieft Accelerator ArtSpace houses a 750,000-volt Cockcroft-Walton particle accelerator. Originally built by Dr. Sam Allison, professor of physics at University of Chicago, it was moved to Elmhurst in the late 1960s and became operational in 1973. The accelerator was deactivated when the building began its new life as an art exhibition space in 2004.
- The A.C. Buehler Library, named in honor of the former president of the Victor Comptometer Corporation and board of trustees member, is home to over 237,000 volumes and a highly regarded collection of Chicago Imagists art. It opened in 1971 and was renovated in 1993 and again in 2002, due to a donation from the estate of graduate Gladys (1940) and Ray Robinson. The library now has almost a hundred computers for general use and thousands of audio-visual materials. The library is also home for the Learning Center (tutoring and study skills assistance for students), the Center for Professional Excellence, which provides career guidance, resume assistance, internships, networking, mentoring and job shadowing opportunities for all students, as well as the Rudolf G. Schade Archives and Special Collections and the Honors Program student lounge.
- Daniels Hall, renamed in 2008 in honor of former Speaker of the Illinois House of Representatives and current Elmhurst University faculty member Lee A. Daniels, is home to the computer laboratories, the departments of Mathematics, Computer Science and Information Systems, World Languages, Literatures & Cultures, Intercultural Studies, and Geography and Geosciences. It opened in 1988 as the Computer Science and Technology Center. Daniels Hall is also home to the Graduate Admission office, as well as general classrooms, the Gretsch Recording Studio.
- Constructed in 1911 as a dormitory and named for the fourth president, Daniel Irion, Irion Hall now houses the Music department. The building's 120-seat Buik Recital Hall (named in honor of The Buik family, including former board of trustees member Donald W. Buik and his wife Betty, as well as the John J. Roche family) is used for concerts, recitals and lectures. Buik was renovated in 2013 due to a donation from graduate and benefactor Lori Julian (2008). Irion Hall housed the college's first official library from 1912 to 1922. The building was fully renovated in 1979 and has its own recording studio as well as a choir room, rehearsal hall, percussion room, listening room, two music classrooms, extensive music libraries and individual practice rooms.
- Kranz Forum is the site of a statue of Reinhold Niebuhr, a preeminent 20th-century theologian and 1910 graduate of the Elmhurst Proseminary, and the former site of Kranz Hall, constructed in 1873 and the first building on campus. The Niebuhr statue was sculpted by Robert Berks and has Niebuhr's Serenity Prayer etched on it in two places. Kranz Hall was razed in 1981, and Kranz Forum dedicated in 1982. The plaque noting the location of Kranz Hall is mounted on a base built with stone blocks salvaged from the original building.
- Memorial Hall houses the Deicke Center for Nursing Education. Formerly Memorial Library, the building was named in honor of the 900 young men of the Evangelical Synod who lost their lives in World War I. The original dedication plaques for those lost are still located in the main lobby, which remains as it was when the building opened in 1922. Memorial Library was renovated for its current use and renamed Memorial Hall when Buehler Library opened in 1971. In 2014, the Nursing Simulation Laboratory moved out of Memorial Hall and into its new facility at Elmhurst Memorial Hospital in a collaboration between the two institutions.
- Built in 1878 as a dormitory, Old Main (also known as Hauptgebaude) is the oldest building on campus. It houses the departments of Art, Urban Studies, History, Religious Studies, Sociology & Criminal Justice, and Political Science, as well as art studios (including individual spaces for student artists) and general classrooms. Old Main is listed on the National Register of Historic Places. It was renovated in 1920 after a major fire, and again in 1976 and 1995. At one time or another, Old Main housed the science labs, the college cafeteria, a pipe organ, and a Fumatorium (smoking room) where students in the early 1900s smoked, talked and played chess. Along with Irion Hall, Old Main even served as the university library (in an unofficial capacity) before Memorial Library was built.
- Mill Theater was acquired by the university in the early 1960s. Before becoming the primary theatrical space for the college, the single story building functioned as the molding mill for the Hammerschmidt lumber operations. (Legend has it that David Payne, Theater Technical Director who died in an accident in 1968, haunts the theater and Scene Shop.) The theater itself is a thrust space with seating for 180. With the donations from alumni, improvements were made in 2010 which included a new lighting system, sound system, ventilation, and stage. The summer of 2012 saw a renovation of the lobby, doubling its size, and included the addition of a new box office, public restrooms and renovated theater seating, due to alumna Meredith Wallenberg Morrison's (1972) donation through The Wollenberg Foundation. A "black box" style theater like those found in many cities and towns, Mill Theater gives students hands-on experience with all aspects of theater operations, including the opportunity to direct as well as have their own original stage plays workshopped and possibly premiered.
- The Science Center, dedicated in 1966 and renamed the Arthur J. Schaible Science Center in 1994 in honor of an accomplished graduate (1929) and benefactor, houses the Biology, Chemistry & Biochemistry, Psychology, and Physics departments, as well as general classrooms and 120-seat lecture room Illinois Hall. It also houses the Bates Observatory, which has a 14" computer-controlled Schmidt–Cassegrain telescope and is named in honor of benefactors Alben F. Bates, an Elmhurst attorney, and board of trustees member Joy P. Rasin. Renovation was completed on the physics labs in 2014, the two main biology labs were renovated in 2015, and in 2016, two chemistry labs were renovated.
- Goebel Hall, which opened in 1928 as the university gymnasium, was renovated in 1978 and again in 1989, when it was converted into an administration building and renamed in honor of the university's third president, Peter Goebel. Offices for Academic Affairs, Advising, Student Financial Services, and Registration and Records can be found there. The lower-level houses the Football locker rooms and offices.
- The Physical Education Center opened in 1983, and was renamed R.A. Faganel Hall in 2000 in honor of graduate Robert A. Faganel (1952). Faganel Hall houses the Kinesiology Department, athletic coaching offices, two basketball courts (competition and practice), two racquetball courts, a dance studio, training rooms, equipment rooms and team locker rooms. The Tyrrell Fitness Center was added on the west side of the building in 2001 and provides weight training and physical fitness facilities for students, faculty and staff. The center is named in honor of former board of trustees chairperson and graduate Tom Tyrrell (1967) and his wife Diane Tyrrell, who donated the funds for its construction.
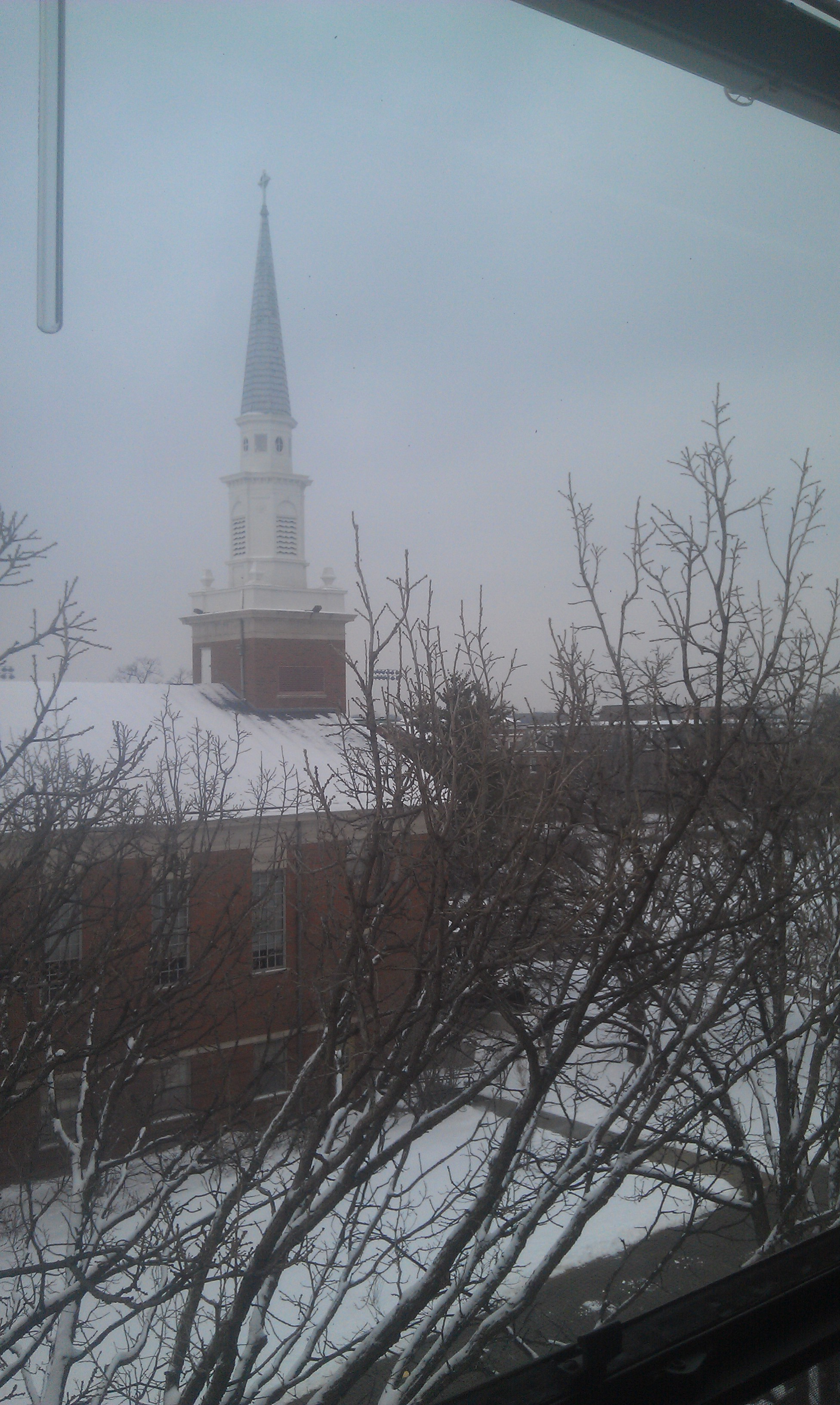
  Chapel, from Stanger Hall
- Hammerschmidt Memorial Chapel, dedicated in 1959 and named in honor of benefactor Louis Hammerschmidt and family, serves as both a place of worship and for public lectures, musical events and other assemblies. The building served as a temporary library in 1993 when the A.C. Buehler library was being renovated, then underwent its own renovation and reopened 1994. It houses the English and Philosophy departments as well as general classrooms. The chapel has two pipe organs, a Moller Opus on the stage in the main auditorium and a smaller pipe organ in the Prayer Chapel. The main auditorium seats about 1,000.
- Lehmann Hall opened in 1951 as a senior men's dormitory, and is named after the university's seventh president, Timothy Lehmann. In 1982, it was remodeled and houses the Office of the President as well as Communication and Public Affairs, Development and Alumni Relations, Office of Campus Security, and academic departments Communication Arts and Sciences, Economics, and Business.
- Jean Koplin Memorial Hall (formerly Circle Hall, dedicated in 2004) houses the Admission Office, as well as the Speech Clinic, the Communication Sciences & Disorders department, the Education department, and general classrooms.
- The Lester Brune Tennis Courts, built in 2003, are named in honor of graduate and benefactor Lester H. Brune (1948) as a gift to the university from his wife, graduate and benefactor Joan Brune (1951).

=== Social justice history ===
In 1943–44, Elmhurst University admitted four new students from California—American citizens of Japanese descent, or Nisei—at a time when more than 110,000 people of Japanese descent had been sent to 10 government "relocation centers" in desolate regions of the American West. Elmhurst was one of a number of colleges and universities that attempted to right the wrong of the relocation camps by opening its doors to Japanese-American students during World War II. (The U.S. government agreed that the Nisei could enroll in participating schools, provided that they passed an FBI background check.) The Student Refugee Committee, a new campus organization, and President Timothy Lehmann paved the way for the students to enroll—over the vocal opposition of a small group of local residents, including members of the American Legion. The Elmhurst Press ran a front-page editorial with the headline, "No Room For Jap Students in this Town". However, support for the Nisei on campus was "practically 100 percent", President Lehmann noted at the time.

In the summer of 1966, the university brought Dr. Martin Luther King Jr. to the podium of Hammerschmidt Memorial Chapel during Dr. King's historic, yearlong effort to racially desegregate city and suburban neighborhoods in the Chicago area. The university later established an annual Martin Luther King Jr. Guestship, which examines issues and ideas related to Dr. King's work.

The university has fourteen Social Action and Service Groups for students to join, among them Habitat for Humanity, Best Buddies, Active Minds, the Global Poverty Club, Relay For Life, Autism Speaks, Students Assisting Animal Shelters, the Greenjays (sustainability club), Alpha Phi Omega and others.

In 2011, the university decided to include an optional question about prospective students’ sexual orientation and gender identity in its admission application in order to better serve all Elmhurst University students.

== Academics ==
Elmhurst University offers bachelor's degrees and master's degrees. Approximately 3,350 full-time and part-time students are enrolled in its 26 undergraduate academic departments, 15 certificate programs, and 17 master's programs, including an MBA. There are also 15 preprofessional programs, and accelerated Degree Completion Programs designed primarily for working adults. The college offers 63 majors and allows students the flexibility to create their own. The Elmhurst University Integrated Curriculum (EUIC) requires each student to take several courses from the Areas of Knowledge curriculum and the Skill and Value Development subjects, but there is a wide variety of classes that can be used to fulfill these requirements. The average class has 17 students, although lower class sizes exist primarily in courses tailored to fine arts majors. Traditional general educational classes range between 25 and 35 students per class. The student to faculty ratio is 13 to 1. Its most popular undergraduate majors, based on number out of 736 graduates in 2022, were:

- Psychology (83)
- Registered Nursing/Registered Nurse (56)
- Biology/Biological Sciences (42)
- Business Administration, Management and Operations (33)
- Teacher Education (33)
- Communication Sciences and Disorders (29)
- Business Administration and Management (27)

The university has a 4-1-4 academic calendar (four month fall term, optional one month January term (J-term), and four month spring term) as well as two summer school sessions.

The EUabroad program offers students short- and long-term opportunities to study in foreign countries, including bilateral foreign exchange programs with educational institutions around the world.

The Elmhurst Learning and Success Academy (ELSA) is a four-year program that offers a full-time, post-secondary educational experience to young adults with developmental disabilities.

Elmhurst Partners provides corporations and organizations with credit and non-credit workforce training and development as well as customized business consulting.

In the U.S. News & World Report's Best Colleges rankings for 2017, Elmhurst was ranked #4 in the Best Value Schools in the Midwest category, up from #9 last year.

== Student life ==
=== Athletics ===
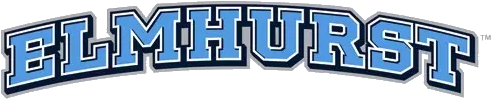
Elmhurst athletics wordmark

Elmhurst athletic teams are nicknamed the Bluejays. The university is a member of the Division III level of the National Collegiate Athletic Association (NCAA), primarily competing in the College Conference of Illinois and Wisconsin (CCIW) for most of their sports since the 1967–68 academic year; which they were a member on a previous stint from 1946–47 to 1959–60, while in women's bowling, a sport with a single NCAA championship open to members of all three NCAA divisions, the school had been a member of the Division II Mid-America Intercollegiate Athletics Association until after the 2018–19 season, but has since become a charter member of the Central Intercollegiate Bowling Conference (CIBC), a new Division III bowling league. The Bluejays previously competed in the Illinois Intercollegiate Athletic Conference (IIAC) from 1925–26 to 1940–41. Their previous nickname was the Pirates.

Elmhurst competes in 20 intercollegiate varsity sports: Men's sports include baseball, basketball, cross country, football, golf, lacrosse, soccer, tennis, track & field and wrestling; while women's sports include basketball, bowling, cross country, golf, lacrosse, soccer, softball, tennis, track & field and volleyball.

Langhorst Field is named in honor of the late Oliver M. Langhorst, multi-sport coach, athletic director and graduate (1930). Elmhurst University competes in only one club sport, men's rugby. The school has won two NCAA national championships, both in women's volleyball in 1983 and 1985.

=== Student organizations ===
Elmhurst University has over 100 non-athletic student-run organizations. The university's radio station is WRSE-FM and the student newspaper is The Leader. MiddleWestern Voice is the Elmhurst University student-run art, literature, and music journal. Elmhurst Esport's organization offers scholarships for 6 different Esport titles, and has a lively gaming club for all students. The student yearbook is The Elms. Both The Leader and MiddleWestern Voice have online and print editions. WRSE's 320 watt signal reaches most of DuPage County and parts of Cook County and Kane County, Illinois, about one million people. It is also streamed online.

=== Greek life and honor societies ===
Elmhurst University is home to six sororities and four fraternities. Elmhurst University also has active chapters of the male music organization Phi Mu Alpha Sinfonia and female music organization Sigma Alpha Iota. Fraternities and sororities do not have houses on or off campus. There are also 23 honor and recognition societies.

=== Traditions ===
The hash bell is a large hand bell rung at Elmhurst ceremonies as a reminder of the long history of the institution. This is the bell that kept the school on schedule in its early years, and generations of alumni have recalled fondly the loud clanging that woke students in the morning, assembled them for classes and activities, and then called them from their chores to dinner in the evening. One of the earliest Elmhurst catalogs declares: "Life in the institution is regulated entirely by the stroke of the bell." Why it came to be called "the hash bell" remains a mystery.

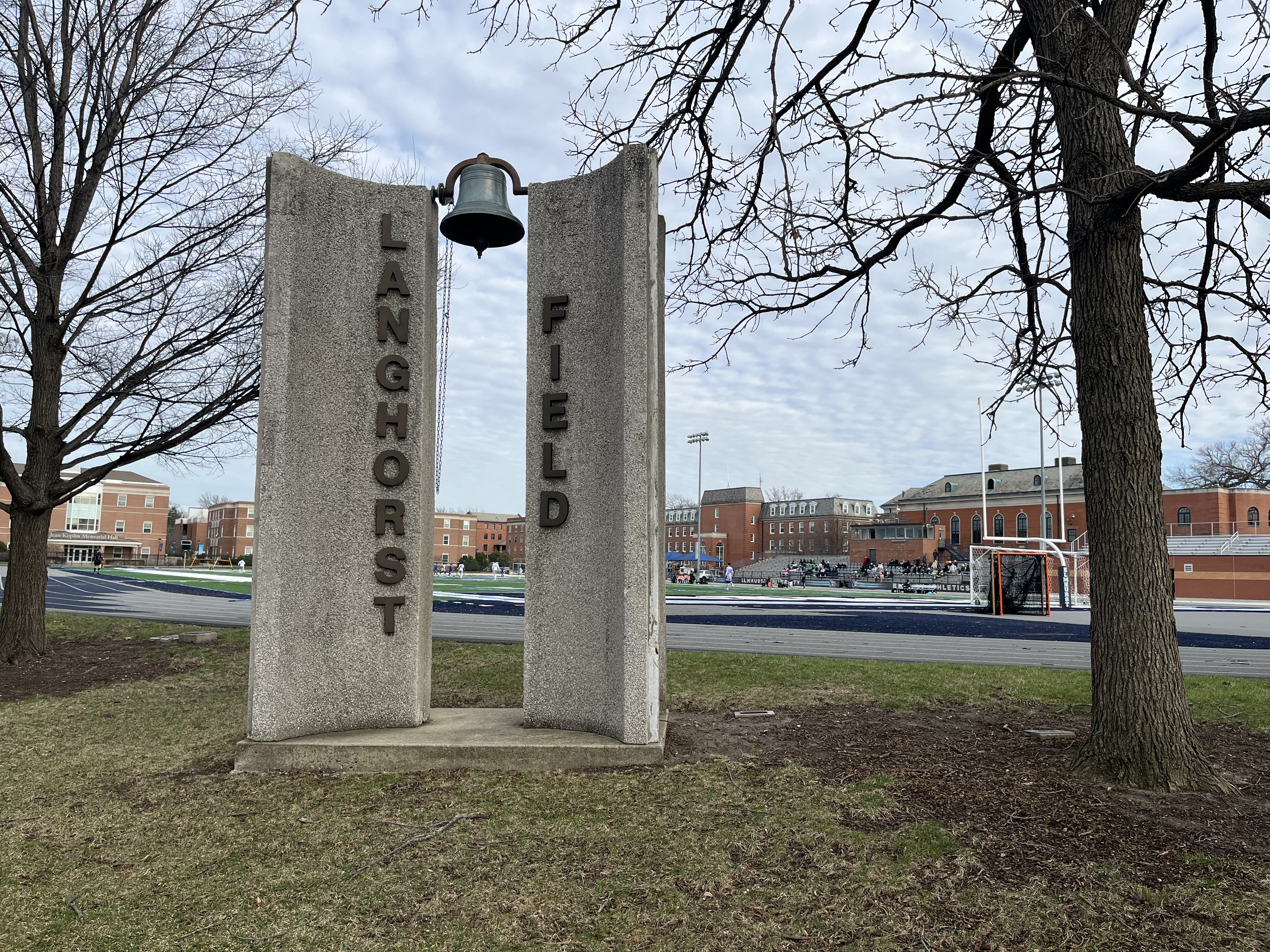
Victory Bell at Langhorst Field

The Victory Bell is a large bell located in the corner of Langhorst Field which is rung by every member of the football team after every home victory. The bell was originally located in the Old Main bell tower and moved to Langhorst Field in a new stone tower as a gift from the class of 1964.

A wood stage in the game room (located in the Bluejays' Roost in the lower level of the Frick Center) is where occasional open mic sessions for students are held, including poetry slams, improv comedy, literary readings, and musical performances, some of which are sometimes impromptu.

The Elmhurst University Jazz Festival is one of the oldest jazz festivals in the nation. It has brought hundreds of high school and college jazz bands from throughout the country and dozens of notable judges and performers such as Dizzy Gillespie, Doc Severinsen, Bobby Shew, Dee Dee Bridgewater, the Count Basie Orchestra, Maynard Ferguson, Clark Terry, Cannonball Adderley, Diane Schuur, Marian McPartland, Frank Mantooth and many others to the stage at Hammerschmidt Chapel.

Student, faculty and staff signatures and dates can be seen inside the clock tower in Old Main, some dating back to the founding years of the university's history. It has remained a rare occasion when students are allowed access, and it is a coveted prize to be able to add your own name.

The university was given the original nativity scene from the movie Home Alone, which is displayed each year during the holiday season.

== Notable persons ==
=== Faculty and staff ===
- Doug Beach – composer and director of the Elmhurst University Jazz Band
- Lee A. Daniels – former Speaker of the Illinois House of Representatives
- Ronald Goetz – theologian
- William Hirstein – philosophy professor
- Suellen Rocca – former curator of the college's art collection and director of exhibitions
