= Konrad Gobel =

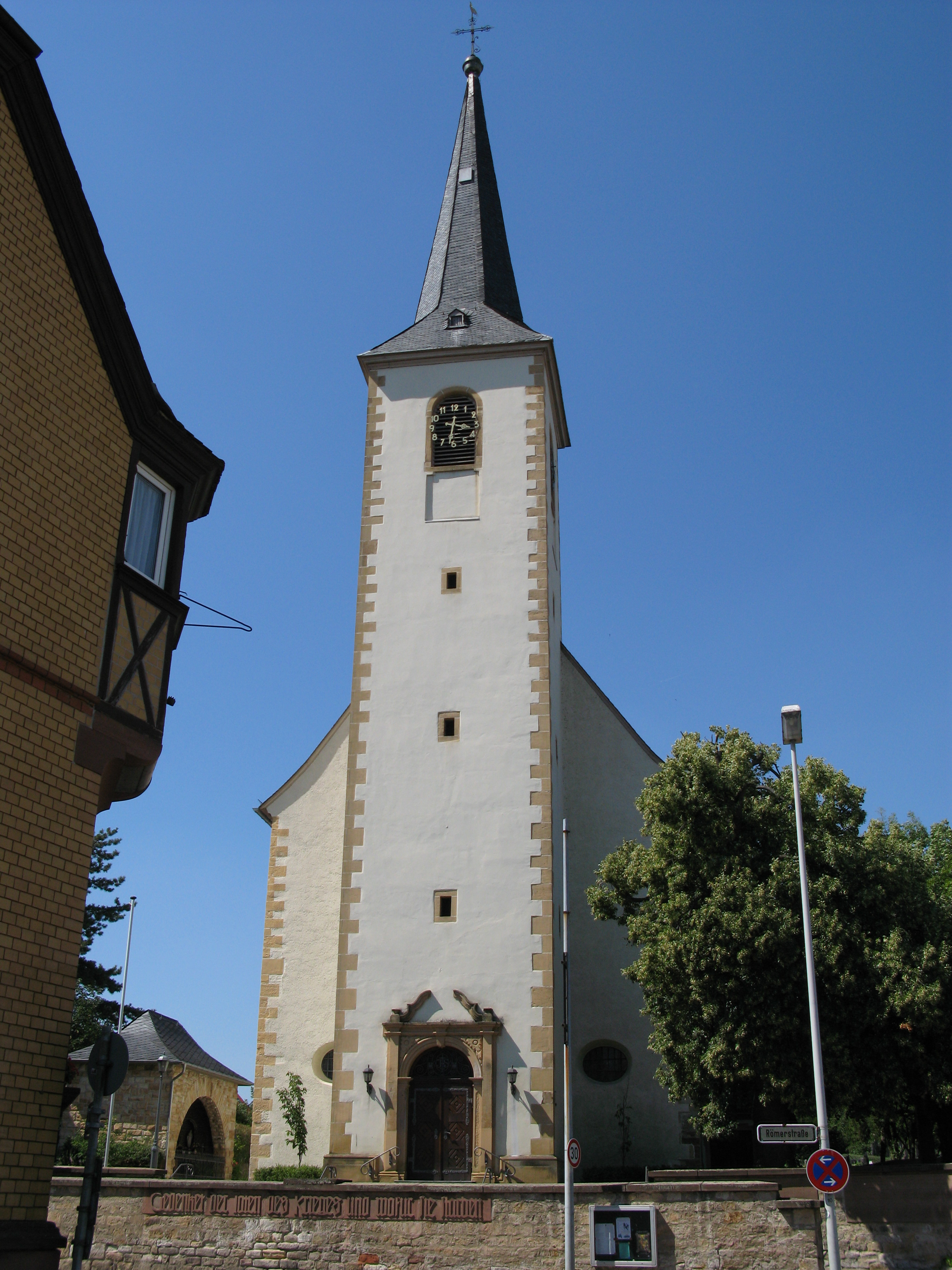
St. Laurentius in Ebersheim, Germany with a bell by Konrad Gobel

Konrad Gobel (c. 1498 – 1557) was a German master craftsman of bells and other metal castings during the sixteenth century.

== Life ==
Gobel was born in Frankfurt am Main around 1498. The son of Niklas Gobel, a metal potter (German: Kannengießer) and journeyman's master (German: Büchsenmeister) from Dinkelsbühl. During the 16th century, the arts and trades blossomed in Frankfurt and in 1528 Konrad Gobel became the leader of the journeyman's association of the town.

== Work ==
Gobel's workshop produced several unique bells for churches in the cities and towns around Frankfurt. These include two bells made in 1545 and 1546 for St. Stephen's Church in Mainz and the central bell made in 1557 for the parish church of St. Laurentius zu Ebersheim in Rheinhessen. His bells are distinguished by the attachment of medallions, ancient coins, and poured metal casts of cut stones. In 1545 Gobel created a small bronze plaque for the coffin of Prince-Elector Albrecht of Brandenburg, the Archbishop of Mainz. This plaque is today on display at the Museum of Decorative Arts, Berlin. He also created the magnificent chandeliers for the West Choir of the Mainz Cathedral, which today no longer exists.
