= James Gobel =

American contemporary artist (born 1972)

James Gobel (born 1972, in Portland, Oregon) is an American contemporary visual artist who makes paintings, often humorous, using non-traditional materials such as hand-cut felt, yarn, and embroidery thread to explore themes of queer identity.

== Education ==
James Gobel attended the University of Nevada, Las Vegas (UNLV), where he earned a Bachelor of Fine Arts (BFA) in 1996. Although attracted to the visual arts, he wasn't particularly interested in becoming an artist when he entered UNLV. Gobel's perspective changed after taking a class with the influential art and culture critic Dave Hickey. Gobel was impressed by the supportive atmosphere Hickey fostered for his young artists and the compelling visiting lecturers he invited, including Eleanor Antin, Peter Schjeldahl, Jim Shaw, and Jeffrey Vallance. Intrigued by the conceptual aspects of art and the practices discussed in class, Gobel sought to understand what had previously puzzled him about art. Later, he would say, "I found through art-making and experiencing art, I could view the world through this new perspective."

In 1999, Gobel received his Master of Fine Arts (MFA) from the University of California, Santa Barbara (UCSB). During this time, his work was featured at the UCSB College of Creative Studies Gallery. Shortly after completing his studies, he began exhibiting solo shows, including one at the Kravets/Wehby Gallery in New York City's Chelsea arts district.

== Artistic practice ==
No Room For Doubt (Featuring Maysha Mohamedi), 2011.Felt, yarn, acrylic and rhinestones on canvas, 108 x 60 inches

Gobel wanted to make art about things he was interested in, and found his subjects in gay magazines featuring big, heavy-set men called Bears. Describing the subject of Gobel’s paintings, artist/writer Nayland Blake puts it this way, “Gobel's project is utopian. He believes that chubby guys have been relegated to the margins of gay life. So he places them in marginal spaces: the rec room, the basement, the rest stop, the barn, the bar, the backwoods. He is trying to make visible something previously unseen: fat gay men acting normal—that is, not out of control, not jolly, not pathetic. One of the dilemmas is that fat, by its very presence on our bodies, is wildly significant. The men in these pictures recline like odalisques, flaunting their curves. They stare directly out of the picture at the camera, at us.” Understanding that his subject matter might not resonate with everyone, and wanting his paintings to reflect how he felt about his subjects—big and cuddly—Gobel employed brightly colored felt to create a visual appeal for all potential viewers.

=== Works ===
Included in the Hammer Projects, a solo 2000 showcase of Gobel’s humorous, tactile portraits celebrating the sensuality of plus-size men (bears) within queer culture, challenged the standard, monolithic media depictions of gay men—such as the hyper-muscular "Tom of Finland" ideal or the lean club kid—by subverting mainstream notions of physical beauty. In his assembled, mosaic-like compositions, he used highly tactile materials like hand-cut felt, yarn, fabric, and embroidery thread, bypassing traditional canvas and paint. He layered elements of Pop Art with structural nods to classical portraits by master painters such as Jean-Auguste-Dominique Ingres.

In his 2010 presentation, I Get What I Want and Always Get It Again!, at Marx & Zavattero in San Francisco, Gobel elevates his portly male subjects to "icon status," depicting them as rock stars in life-size felt, acrylic, and mixed-media artworks. . Through this exhibition, Gobel captures these figures flamboyantly performing on stage, complete with microphones, strobe lights, and glamorous attire. The titles of the pieces are drawn from lyrics of rock songs from his youth and can also be interpreted as humorous puns and metaphors concerning bear culture.

Exploring how different gay bodies have played a significant role in the history and fantasies of American culture, Gobel began researching the 1934 Best Actor Academy Award winner, Charles Laughton. Laughton, who was a burly closeted gay man hiding his true identity from the public, including his wife of 33 years, Elsa Lanchester. Gobel conducted extensive research examining Laughton's personal papers held in the UCLA Special Collections, traveled to Laughton's childhood home in Scarborough, England, and created The Charles Laughton Papers, 2020, a series of works on canvas which he executed in felt, embroidery thread, acrylic, flashe, and PVA. The work explores the ephemera surrounding the actor, such as an entire castle wall, which might suggest one of Laughton's movies or a window from Laughton's childhood home. Still, Gobel never creates a portrait or direct image of the actor, telling us who Laughton was; instead, he gives the viewer the contemplative space of art to consider the actor and man, Charles Laughton. Regarding this biographical approach Gobel says, "I have chosen not to represent his likeness or directly reference his performances, but rather attempt to create opportunities to collaborate or reveal biographical agencies most meaningful to the actor. It is important to note here that my subject’s seminal biography was titled “Charles Laughton: A Difficult Actor.” Known for temper tantrums and creative differences with many of his peers, Charles’ story is made of many layers."

In his 2026 exhibition Hellbent For at de Boer Gallery in Los Angeles, Gobel moves away from his figurative portraits of heavyset queer men to explore domestic aesthetics and coded visibility, channeling identity through space, memory, and personal objects, such as symbols of home and comfort. These include curling plumes of smoke, decorative items, wry pastoral references, and sentimental keepsakes or pets. This work also replaces his use of tactile mosaic felt with the flat surfaces of Flashe (extra-fine vinyl paint) and embroidery floss.

In 2000, Gobel's work was the subject of a solo show at the Hammer Museum in their Hammer Projects series.

In 2009, Gobel was awarded the San Francisco Bay Area's; Artadia Award.

=== Solo exhibitions ===
- 2002 James Gobel, Kravets/Wehby Gallery, New York, NY
- 2005 Ridicule is Nothing to Be Scared of, Kravets/Wehby, New York, NY
- 2007 I [heart] JCRT, Kravets/Wehby Gallery, New York, NY
- 2008 Bear Hunting, Marx & Zavattero, San Francisco, CA
- 2008 Happy Hour, Steve Turner Contemporary, Los Angeles, CA
- 2010 I Get What I Want, and Always Get It Again!, Marx & Zavattero, San Francisco, CA
- 2012 Fancy Wander Free, Steve Turner Contemporary, Los Angeles, CA 2012 Solo booth presentation, Houston Contemporary Art Fair, TX, Steve Turner Contemporary
- 2014 Brocrastination, Pool Art Gallery, Drury University, Springfield, MO
- 2015 Gift a Feast (two-person exhibition with Maysha Mohamedi) Pop up Exhibition at 96 Lafayette St., San Francisco, CA
- 2015 Awake in The Golden State (two-person exhibition with Sandy Rodriguez), Sonce Alexander Gallery, Los Angeles, CA
- 2016 James Gobel + Nicki Green (two person exhibition), 2 nd Floor Projects, San Francisco, CA
- 2020 i, Claudius, Et. al etc. Gallery, San Francisco, CA
- 2021 Shadrach, Mesach and Abedne’no She Betta Don’t, Bozomag Gallery, Los Angeles, CA
- 2024 The Charles Laughton Papers, Patricia Sweetow Gallery, Los Angeles, CA
- 2026 Hellbent For, de boer Gallery, Los Angeles, CA

=== Teaching ===
James Gobel has been a Professor of Painting and Drawing since 2005 and currently is the co-chair of the MFA in Fine Arts Program at California College of the Arts (CCA).
