= Peter Goebel =

Peter Goebel was the third president of Elmhurst College. He served in this capacity from 1880 to 1887. He was succeeded by Daniel Irion in 1887. Goebel Hall at Elmhurst College is named in his honor.

When Carl Frederick Kranz, a German minister and teacher, established the German Evangelical Proseminary in Elmhurst, Illinois. Its mission was "to maintain a culture in the wilderness, to provide an educated leadership for the developing communities, and to teach liberal arts within the context of the Christian faith." Its primary purpose was to train ministers and teachers for German Evangelical communities. The college presidents were referred to as Inspectors, and they performed much of the actual teaching, recordkeeping, and student oversight. All courses (including English) were taught in the German language. Under the second "Inspector", at least one scientific class (Laboratory Science) was added to the liberal-arts curriculum, but all teaching continued in the German language.

Johann Peter Goebel became the school's chief in 1880 when the second Inspector (Philip Frederick Meusch) died suddenly. Goebel's top priority was to rebuild the faculty, as three members had died or resigned shortly before he took office. Student activities grew significantly during his term of office, in spite of a faculty effort in 1884 to eliminate most student groups. He added another year to the school's curriculum, because of a general observation that incoming students seemed relatively unprepared for the rigorous college-level study. He suggested that teaching be conducted in English, but his suggestion was not adopted at that time.

Daniel Irion, who succeeded Goebel in 1887 as Inspector, was the institution's first American-born leader. He remained in the office until 1919.

The Proseminary was officially renamed the Elmhurst Academy and Junior College in 1919.
