= Walther F. Goebel =

Walther Frederick Goebel (December 24, 1899 – November 1, 1993) was an American immunologist and an organic chemist, a member of the National Academy of Sciences. Goebel was known for his research of polysaccharides.

== Awards and distinctions ==
- member of the National Academy of Sciences
- honorary degrees from Rockefeller University in 1978 and Middlebury College in 1959
