= Barbara Göpel =

German art historian

Barbara Göpel, née Barbara Malwine Auguste Sperling (24 February 1922, Arnsberg – 26 September 2017, Munich) was a German art historian.

== Life ==
Her father Hans Sperling was a lawyer and came from Berlin. Her mother Auguste Elisabeth was also from Berlin. In 1934, the Sperling family returned to Berlin.

Barbara worked in the Palais Beauharnais at the German embassy under Nazi Germany's ambassador to France Otto Abetz in Paris. In autumn 1943 Barbara met her future husband, Erhard Göpel, who, as the procurer of art objects for Hitler's Führermuseum Linz, was involved in looting art from Jewish art collections.

After the war, she worked in the secretariat of the weekly newspaper Die Zeit.

In 1950, she married the art historian Erhard Göpel. Together they worked on the catalog of Max Beckmann's paintings. After the death of her husband in 1966, she completed the catalog of the paintings in 1976 with the help of the Max Beckmann Society, which she co-founded in 1951.

In her will, she bequeathed a collection of works by Max Beckmann to the Staatliche Museen Berlin, including the works Self-Portrait in a Bar (1942) and Portrait of Erhard Göpel (1944) as well as 46 drawings and 52 prints.

In 2018, she donated a collection of Max Beckmann artworks to the Berlin State Museums, which caused a controversy because of her husband Erhard Göpel's involvement in looting artwork from Holocaust victims.

== Publications ==
- Leben und Meinungen des Malers Hans Purrmann, Limes Verl., Wiesbaden 1961
- Max Beckmann, zusammen mit Erhard Göpel, Kornfeld, Bern
