= Goble =

Goble is a surname. Notable people with the surname include:

- Aashka Goradia Goble (born 1985), Indian entrepreneur and former actress
- Brian Roy Goble (1957–2014), Canadian singer and musician
- Carole Goble (born 1961), professor of computer science
- Dorothy Goble (1827–1897), Australian politician
- Elaine Goble (born 1956), Canadian visual artist
- George H. Goble (1952–2026), American electrical engineer, inventor and Ig Nobel Prize winner
- Graeham Goble (born 1947), Australian singer-songwriter, founder of Little River Band
- Jonathan Goble (1827–1897), American Baptist minister and missionary in Japan
- Les Goble (1932–2019), American football player
- Paul Goble (writer and illustrator) (1933–2017), author and illustrator of children's books
- Paul A. Goble (born 1949), American analyst, writer and columnist
- Robert Goble (1903–1991), English harpsichord builder
- Sean Patrick Goble (born 1966), American serial killer
- Stanley Goble (1891–1948), Australian World War I ace, Royal Australian Air Force air vice marshal and Chief of the Air Staff
- Steve Goble (born 1960), English footballer
- Tony Goble (1943–2007), Welsh artist
- Warwick Goble (1862–1943), Victorian illustrator of children's books

== See also ==
- Gobles, Michigan, United States, a city
