= Maidstone Manor Farm =

Historic house in West Virginia, United States

- U.S. National Register of Historic Places
- U.S. Historic district
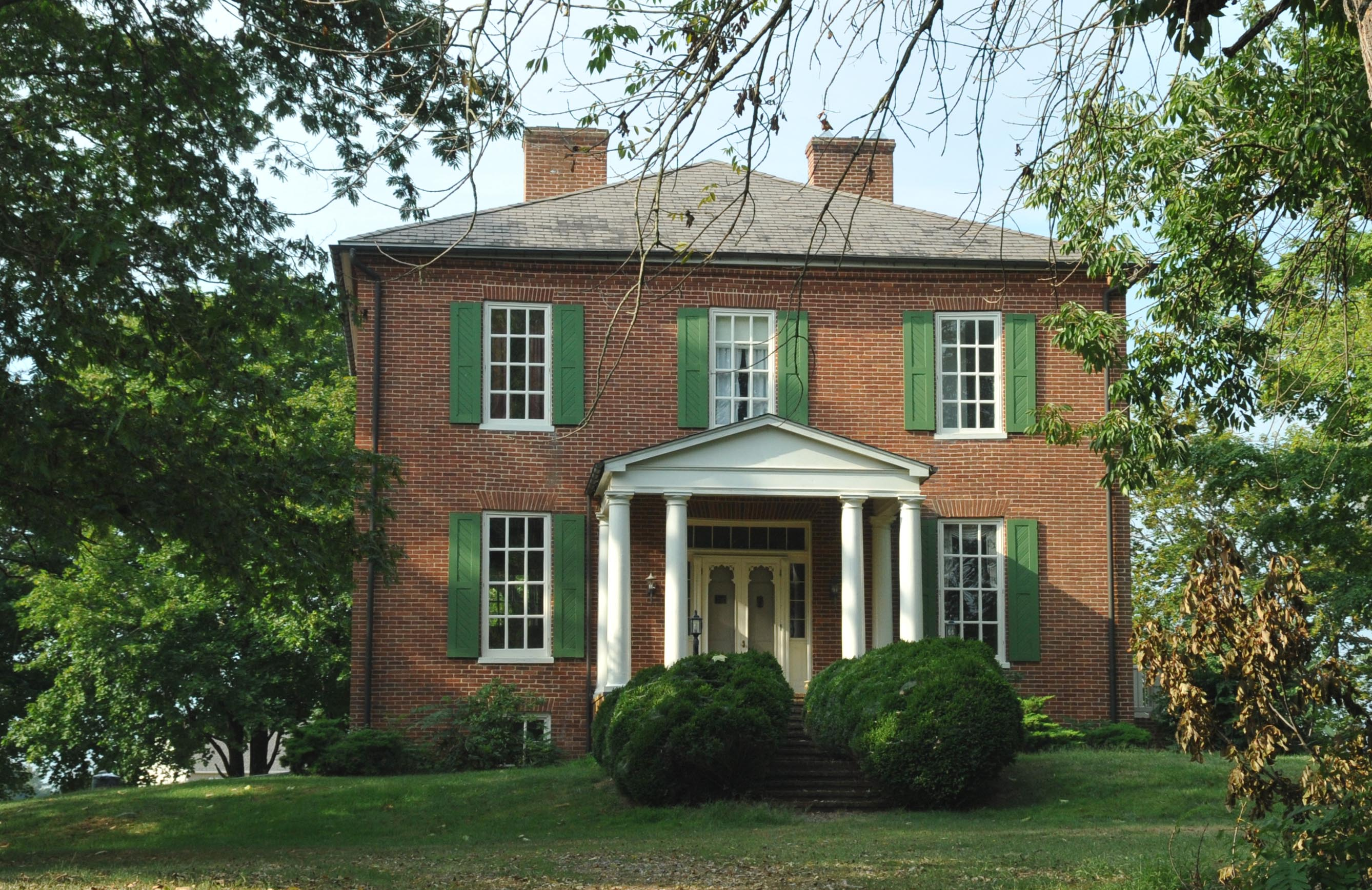

- Location within West Virginia Location within the United States
- Location: County Route 1/4, near Hedgesville, West Virginia
- Coordinates: 39°35′14″N 77°54′32″W
- Area: 267 acres (108 ha)
- Built: 1848
- Architect: Leigh, William
- MPS: Berkeley County MRA
- NRHP reference No.: 80004408
- Added to NRHP: December 10, 1980

Maidstone Manor Farm, also known as William R. Leigh House, is a national historic district located near Hedgesville, Berkeley County, West Virginia. It encompasses a historic farm with three contributing buildings and one contributing site, the site of a slave cabin. The plantation house is a two-story, square brick dwelling with a slate covered pyramidal roof. It is three bays wide and two bays deep and features a one bay entrance portico supported by paired Doric order columns. Also on the property are a barn and brick smokehouse. It was the birthplace of noted artist William Robinson Leigh (1866-1955), father of William Colston Leigh, Sr. (1901-1992).

It was listed on the National Register of Historic Places in 1980.
