= William C. Traphagen =

American lawyer and politician

Member of the New York State Senate
- In office January 1, 1886 – December 31, 1887
- Preceded by: J. Hampden Robb
- Succeeded by: Jacob A. Cantor

Personal details
- Born: William Conselyea Traphagen; November 29, 1837 Jersey City, New Jersey
- Died: October 26, 1894 (aged 56) Nyack, New York
- Party: Democrat
- Spouse: Caroline Ross Maxwell
- Relations: Henry Traphagen (brother)
- Children: John C. Traphagen
- Parent(s): Henry Mackaness Traphagen; Sarah Conselyea
- Education: Rutgers College

William Conselyea Traphagen (November 29, 1837 – October 26, 1894) was an American lawyer and politician.

== Early life ==
Traphagen was born in Jersey City, New Jersey on November 29, 1837. He was the son of Henry Mackaness Traphagen (1809–1884) and Sarah (née Conselyea) Traphagen. His brother, Henry Traphagen, was the 19th Mayor of Jersey City, and his sister, Pheobe Traphagen, married Dr. Beriah Andrew Watson. His father, a wealthy and prominent citizen of Jersey City and leader in many important civic movements.

His paternal grandparents were Neeltje (née Van Vorst) Traphagen (a daughter of wealthy early settler Cornelius Van Vorst (1728-1818), and great-aunt of Jersey City mayor Cornelius Van Vorst (1822-1906)) and Henry Traphagen (son of Henry Traphagen, who was a trustee of Rutgers College in 1782). His first American ancestor was Willem Jansen Traphagen of Lemgo, County of Lippe, Westphalia, who came to New Amsterdam in 1647. His maternal grandparents were William Conselyea and Phebe (née Duryea) Conselyea.

He was educated at Rutgers College, graduating in 1858.

== Career ==
Traphagen became an attorney and practiced law in New York City for several years, living at 14 East 63rd Street. A Democrat, he was elected to the New York State Senate to represent the 10th Senatorial District, New York City, in 1886, and serving one term in the 109th and 110th New York State Legislatures. While in the Senate, he was a member of the Committees on Commerce, Navigation, Insurance, Privileges and Elections, and Engrossed Bills.

After spending a number of years in Nyack, New York as a Summer resident, he became a permanent resident of Nyack in May 1893.

== Personal life ==
Traphagen was married to Caroline Ross Maxwell (1853–1936), a daughter of Caroline Ely (née Milligan) Maxwell and diplomat John Stevenson Maxwell (son of Hugh Maxwell, the New York County District Attorney and Collector of the Port of New York under Presidents Zachary Taylor and Millard Fillmore). Together, they were the parents of:

- Eleanor Van Vorst Traphagen (1875–1960), who married William Bisland Williams Jr., son of William Bisland Williams and Mary Mildred (née Gandy) Williams, in 1902.
- John Stevenson Maxwell Traphagen (1876–1883), who died young.
- Carrie Traphagen (1878–1880), who died young.
- Ethel Traphagen (1882–1963), founder of the Traphagen School of Fashion; she married William Robinson Leigh, son of William B. Leigh and Mary White (née Colston) Leigh, in 1921.
- John Conselyea Traphagen (1889–1979), who married Janet Voorhis, a daughter of Margaret (née McAdam) Voorhis and Augustus Marvin Voorhis, a president of the Nyack National Bank, in 1920. Her grandfather, William Voorhis, was a member of the New York State Assembly for Rockland County and served as Commodore of the Atlantic Yacht Club.
- Maxwell Eustace Traphagen (1890–1934), who married Sarah Neilson Stearns of Philadelphia.

Traphagen died of Bright's disease at his home in Nyack on October 26, 1894. After a funeral at his Nyack residence, he was buried at Cypress Hills Cemetery in Brooklyn, New York.

New York State Senate
| Preceded by J. Hampden Robb | New York State Senate; 10th District; 1886–1887 | Succeeded by Jacob A. Cantor |
