= New Orleans, Jackson and Great Northern =

Former railway between Mississippi and New Orleans

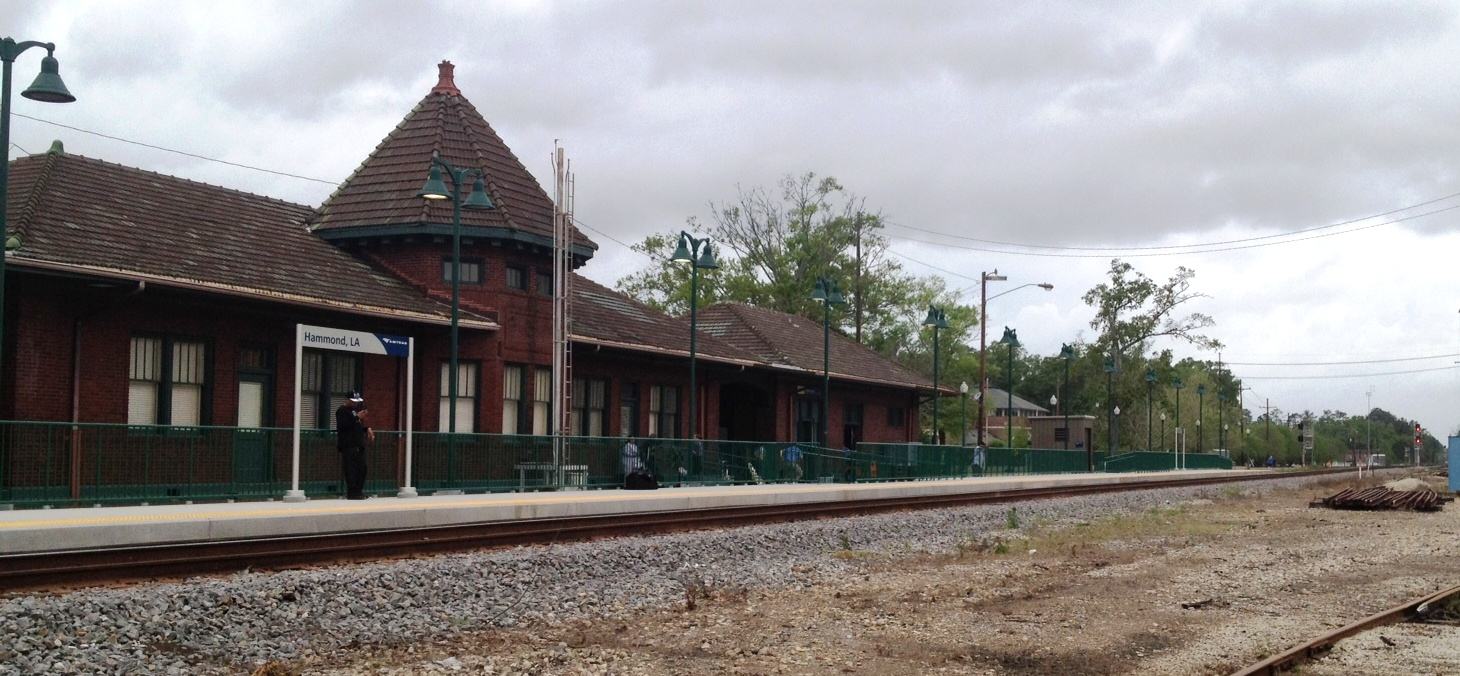
Amtrak station in Hammond, Louisiana, refurbished with a passenger platform along the original path of the New Orleans, Jackson and Great Northern

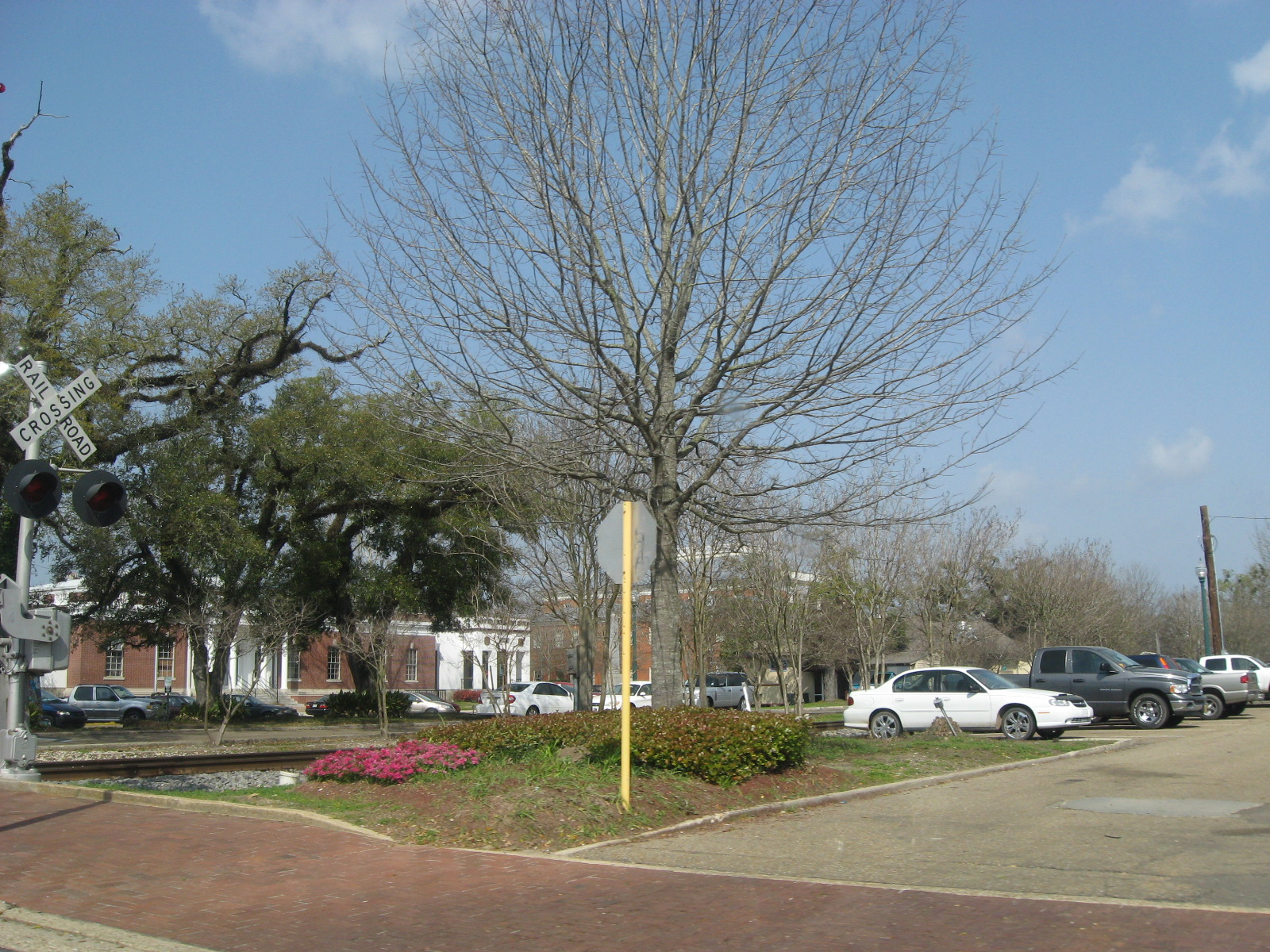
Part of the original route of the New Orleans, Jackson and Great Northern, still operational in the Canadian National Railway line at this railroad crossing in Hammond, Louisiana.

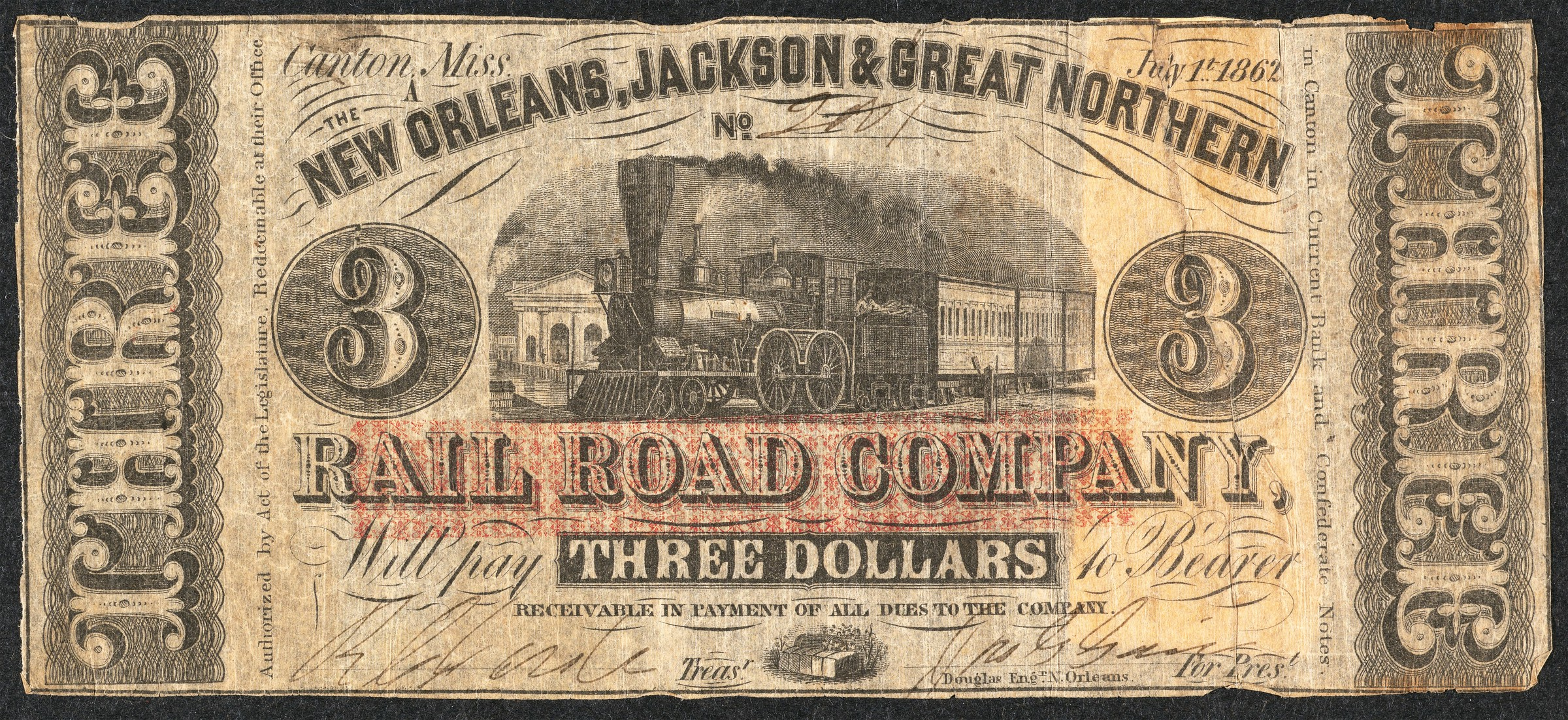
1862 3-dollar note issued by New Orleans Jackson & Great Northern Railroad Company (Mississippi).

The New Orleans, Jackson and Great Northern was a 206-mile (332 km) 5 ft (1,524 mm) gauge railway originally commissioned by the State of Illinois, with both Stephen Douglas and Abraham Lincoln being among its supporters in the 1851 Illinois Legislature. It connected Canton, Mississippi with New Orleans, and was completed just before the American Civil War, in which it served strategic interests, especially for the Confederacy. This was largely due to the efforts of its president, Henry Joseph Ranney, a Confederate officer during the period of 1861 to 1865, who had served as part of the original engineering corps for the Baltimore and Ohio Railroad. The New Orleans, Jackson, and Great Northern was largely in ruins by the end of the War. From 1866 to 1870, when a hostile takeover induced a change of leadership, the president of the New Orleans, Jackson and Great Northern was P. G. T. Beauregard (1818-1893), former Confederate States Army general under whose command the first shots had been fired on Fort Sumter and who during the war helped design the Confederate battle flag. James Robb (banker) was a director.

Restored as part of the Mississippi Central Railroad (1852-1874), the properties originally belonging to the New Orleans, Jackson and Great Northern were merged into the Illinois Central Railroad in 1878. In 1972, it became the Illinois Central Gulf Railroad, after merging with the Gulf, Mobile and Ohio Railroad.

In 1998 the Illinois Central Railroad merged into the Canadian National Railway system. The original rights-of-way for the New Orleans, Jackson and Great Northern not only serve the purpose of a major freight railway but also support Amtrak passenger service.
