= William Robinson Leigh =

American painter

William Robinson Leigh (September 23, 1866 – March 11, 1955) was an American artist and illustrator, who was known for his painted Western scenes.

== Early life ==
William Robinson Leigh was born on September 23, 1866, at Maidstone Manor Farm, Berkeley County, West Virginia. He was a son of naval officer William B. Leigh (1814–1888) and, his second wife, Mary White (née Colston) Leigh (1832–1918), who were first cousins. His father's first wife, Gabriella "Ella" Wickham (a daughter of John Wickham), died giving birth to their only child. Among his siblings were Benjamin Watkins Leigh, Edward Colston Leigh, Raleigh Thomas Colston Leigh, and Thomas Watkins Leigh.

His paternal grandparents were U.S. Senator Benjamin Watkins Leigh and, his second wife, Susanna (née Colston) Leigh. His aunt, Susan Leigh, was the wife of Conway Robinson. His maternal grandparents were U.S. Representative Edward Colston and, his second wife, Sara Jane (née Brockenbrough) Colston.

He entered the Maryland Institute for the Promotion of the Mechanic Arts (now known as Maryland Institute College of Art) at age 14, then attended the Royal Academy in Munich, winning four successive bronze medals at academy exhibitions beginning in 1884 and silver medals in 1891 and 1892. He spent twelve years abroad before returning to the United States.

== Career ==
In 1895 he returned to New York City, New York where he opened an art studio. He painted cycloramas and made illustrations for Scribner's and Collier's magazines, including the cover illustration of the August 4, 1904 Leslie's Weekly featuring a policeman "Piloting Children to Safety at a Crowded New York Crossing."

In 1906, Leigh traveled to the American West at the request of the Santa Fe Railroad to paint the Grand Canyon, while maintaining his studio in New York City. In 1926 he travelled to Africa at the invitation of Carl Akeley for the American Museum of Natural History, and from this experience wrote and illustrated Frontiers of Enchantment: An Artist's Adventures in Africa. In 1933, he wrote and illustrated The Western Pony. His adventures were chronicled in a number of popular magazines including Life, the Saturday Evening Post. He is known for painting the Grand Canyon and Yellowstone National Park, but his primary interest was the Hopi and Navajo Indians. In 1953 he was elected into the National Academy of Design as an Associate member and became a full Academician in 1955.

Leigh also made astrobiological art for the March 1908 issue of Cosmopolitan, with four full-page illustrations of an article written by H. G. Wells, "The Things that Live on Mars", which speculated about Martian life. Science fiction writer Edmond Hamilton, born October 1904, described looking and re-looking at the issue as a defining experience in his life. "I wasn't yet able to read it, to read the article, but those pictures!"

== Personal life ==
Leigh was twice married. He wed his first wife, nurse Anna Seng, in 1899, who was one of the original Gibson Girls. Before their divorce in c. 1903, they were the parents of:

- William Colston Leigh, Sr. (1901–1992), who married Helen M. Cady. They divorced and he married Ardis Neff in 1946.

In 1921, he married his second wife, Ethel Traphagen Leigh (1883–1963), the founder of the Traphagen School of Fashion in New York City. She was a daughter of New York State Senator William C. Traphagen and sister of John C. Traphagen, former president of the Bank of New York.

Leigh died on March 11, 1955 at his home, 200 West 57th Street (also known as the Rodin Studios) in Manhattan. After his death, Leigh's New York studio was given to the Gilcrease Museum in Tulsa, Oklahoma.

== Selected work ==
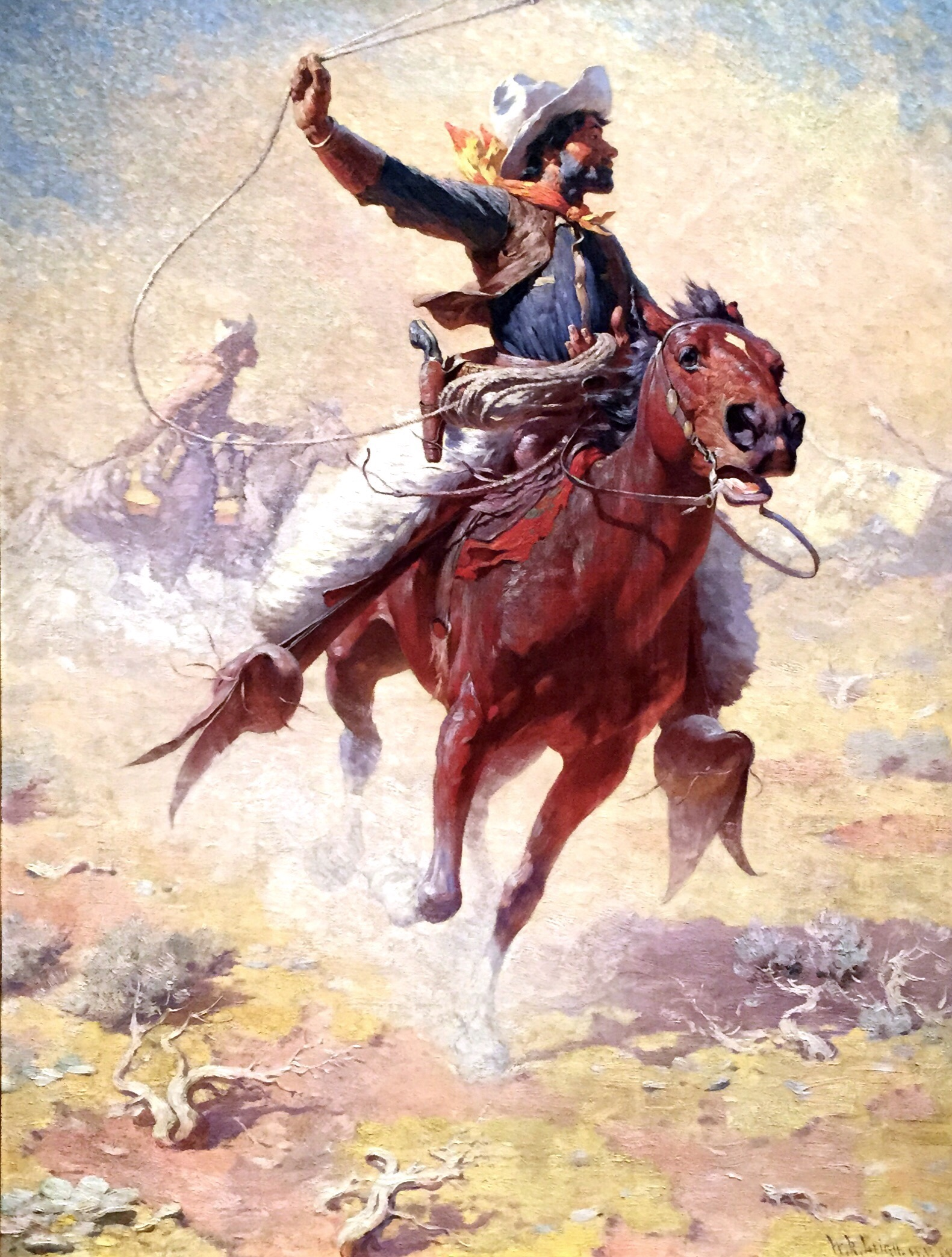
The Roping, 1914 oil on canvas, signed W. R. Leigh

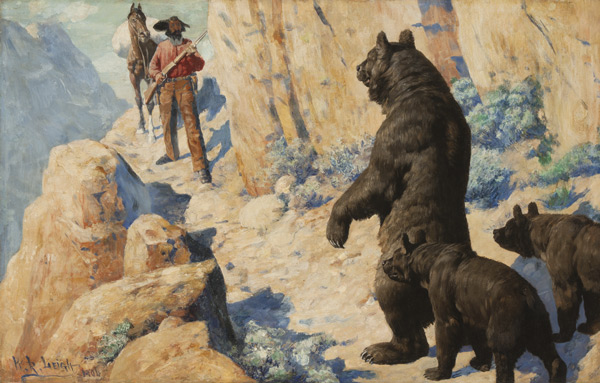
Bears in the Path (Surprise), 1904, Oil on canvas, Sid Richardson Museum, Fort Worth, Texas

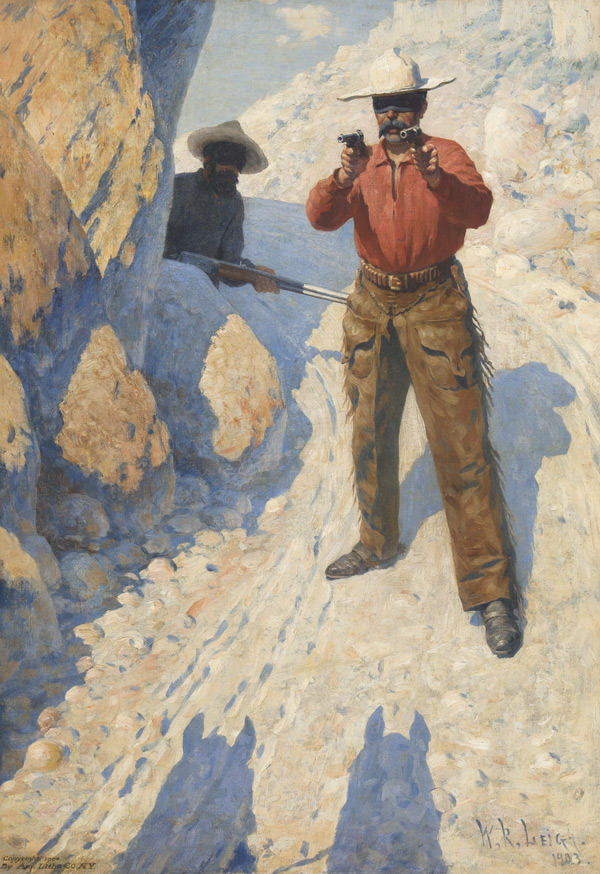
The Hold Up (The Ambush), 1903, Oil on canvas, Sid Richardson Museum, Fort Worth, Texas

== Bibliography ==
- Conzelman, Adrienne Ruger (2002). After the Hunt: The Art Collection of William B. Ruger. Stackpole Books. ISBN 9780811700375. OCLC 49936053.
- Cummins, D. Duane (1980). William Robinson Leigh: Western Artist. University of Oklahoma Press. ISBN 0806116285. OCLC 5940997.
- Leigh, William Robinson (1938). Frontiers of Enchantment: An Artist's Adventures in Africa. Simon and Schuster. OCLC 989645.
- Leigh, William Robinson, Autobiography, (MSS SC 171), L. Tom Perry Special Collections, Harold B. Lee Library, Brigham Young University.
