= Robb House (New York City) =

Building in Manhattan, New York

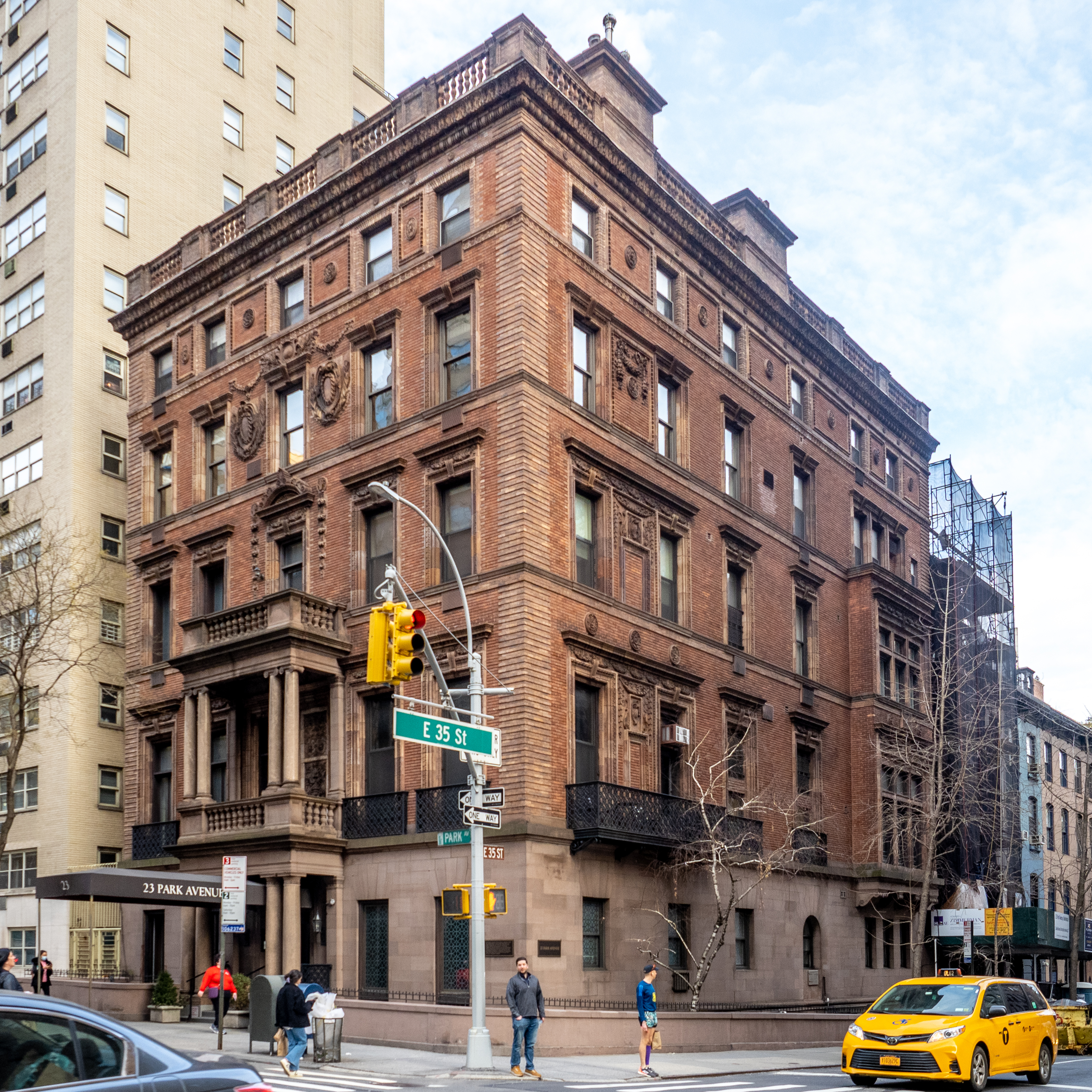
- The former townhouse and clubhouse in 2022, now a cooperative apartment building
- Interactive map of the Robb House area

General information
- Architectural style: Italian Renaissance Revival
- Location: 23 Park Avenue; New York City, US
- Coordinates: 40°44′52″N 73°58′50″W
- Year built: 1888–1892

Design and construction
- Architect: Stanford White
- Architecture firm: McKim, Mead & White

New York City Landmark
- Designated: November 17, 1998
- Reference no.: 2026

The Robb House, located at 23 Park Avenue on the corner of East 35th Street in the Murray Hill neighborhood of Manhattan, New York City is a townhouse built in 1888-92 and designed in the Italian Renaissance revival style by McKim, Mead & White, with Stanford White as the partner-in-charge.

== History ==
The townhouse was built as the residence of James Hampden Robb, a retired businessman and former state assemblyman and senator, and his wife Cornelia Van Rensselaer Robb. It was designed in the Italian Renaissance revival style by McKim, Mead & White, with Stanford White as the partner-in-charge; it was one of the earlier townhouses designed by White in that style. On its completion, architectural critic Russell Sturgis wrote that it was "the most dignified structure in all the quarter of town, not a palace, but a fit dwelling house for a first-rate citizen."

=== Subsequent owners ===
In 1923, the townhouse was bought by the Advertising Club of New York to be its clubhouse. The club was founded in 1896 as the Sphinx Club but by 1915 had changed its name to the current one. The conversion of the residential dwelling into a clubhouse was undertaken by F.T.H. Bacon as consulting engineer, and architect Fred F. French. After a fire in 1946 damaged the top three floors of the building, the club repaired and renovated it, and at the same time purchased the next-door row house at 103 East 35th Street (built in 1853) and joined it to the main building. In 1977, the club began to rent out space in the building to other clubs, and that same year it was sold to a developer who converted it into a cooperative apartment house. What had served the club as its library became the living room of the duplex apartment owned by Kenneth Jay Lane.

The building was designated a New York City landmark in 1998.

== See also ==
- List of New York City Designated Landmarks in Manhattan from 14th to 59th Streets
