= John C. Traphagen =

American banker

President of the Bank of New York
- In office 1931–1948
- Preceded by: Edwin G. Merrill
- Succeeded by: Albert C. Simmonds Jr.

Personal details
- Born: John Conselyea Traphagen; October 20, 1889 Nyack, New York
- Died: October 2, 1979 (aged 89) Bridgeport, Connecticut
- Spouse: Janet Voorhis (m. 1920; died 1975)
- Relations: Henry Traphagen (uncle)
- Children: Hugh Maxwell Traphagen
- Parent(s): William C. Traphagen; Caroline Ross Maxwell
- Education: New York University

John Conselyea Traphagen (October 20, 1889 – October 2, 1979) was an American banker.

== Early life ==
Traphagen was born in Nyack, New York on October 20, 1889 into a family long associated with politics and business. He was a son of Caroline Ross (née Maxwell) Traphagen (1853–1936) and William Conselyea Traphagen (1837–1894). Among his siblings were Eleanor Van Vorst Traphagen (wife of William Bisland Williams Jr.), Ethel Traphagen (founder of the Traphagen School of Fashion and wife of artist William Robinson Leigh), and Maxwell Eustace Traphagen (who married Sarah Neilson Stearns). His father was an attorney who was elected a member of the New York State Senate representing the 10th District, New York City.

His paternal grandparents were Henry Mackaness Traphagen and Sarah (née Conselyea) Traphagen. His father and uncle Henry Traphagen, the 19th Mayor of Jersey City, were great-grandsons of former Jersey City mayor Cornelius Van Vorst. His maternal grandparents were Caroline Ely (née Milligan) Maxwell and Minister John Stevenson Maxwell (son of Hugh Maxwell, the New York County District Attorney and Collector of the Port of New York under Presidents Zachary Taylor and Millard Fillmore).

He attended New York University School of Commerce. Hе was awarded an LL.D. degree from St. Lawrence University in 1934.

== Career ==
In 1905, he began his career with George C. White Jr. & Company, who were dealers in bonds. He served as vice president, and director, of the Seaboard National Bank and, successively by mergers, he became vice president of the Equitable Trust Company and vice president and director of the Chase National Bank.

In 1931 during the Great Depression, Traphagen became president of the Bank of New York, and successfully guided the institution through it with significantly increased deposits. He grew the bank's trust and investment department. Upon the election of Albert C. Simmonds Jr. as president in 1948, he became chairman of the bank, serving until his retirement in 1957. He was a director of the bank from 1931 until 1971.

Traphagen served as a director or trustee of many firms, including the Atlantic Mutual Insurance Company, the Prudential Insurance Company of Great Britain, the Skandia Insurance Company, Babcock & Wilcox, the Baltimore and Ohio Railroad and the International Nickel Company of Canada.

== Personal life ==
In 1920, Traphagen was married to Janet Voorhis (1892–1975), a daughter of Margaret (née McAdam) Voorhis and Augustus Marvin Voorhis, a president of the Nyack National Bank. Her grandfather, William Voorhis, was a member of the New York State Assembly for Rockland County and served as Commodore of the Atlantic Yacht Club. Together, they were the parents of:

- Hugh Maxwell Traphagen (1927–2010), who worked for Lamont–Doherty Earth Observatory.

He was a member of the Holland Society of New York, Pilgrims Society, Saint Andrew's Society of the State of New York and the Saint Nicholas Society of the City of New York. His was also a member of the Century Association, India House, Links Club, Union Club of the City of New York, American Yacht Club and the Rombout Hunt of Dutchess County.

Traphagen died at St. Vincent's Hospital in Bridgeport, Connecticut on October 2, 1979.
