= Is Mars Habitable? =

Book by Alfred Wallace

Is Mars Habitable? A Critical Examination of Professor Percival Lowell's Book "Mars and Its Canals," with an Alternative Explanation is a 1907 non-fiction book by British naturalist Alfred Russel Wallace (1823–1913). The work is a followup to his previous work, Man's Place in the Universe (1903), which initially explored the potential for extraterrestrial life. Is Mars Habitable? follows a similar theme, but is more of a reply and refutation of the book Mars and Its Canals (1906) by astronomer Percival Lowell. Lowell famously argued that an advanced, intelligent civilization engineered Martian canals on the surface of the planet, a now-discredited idea. Wallace's book evaluates Lowell's theory, eventually concluding that Mars "is not only uninhabited by intelligent beings such as Mr. Lowell postulates, but is absolutely uninhabitable", a conclusion Wallace had already reached in Man's Place in the Universe. Historian Charles H. Smith refers to Wallace's book as one of the first works in the field of astrobiology.

== See also ==
- "The Things that Live on Mars" (1908)

== Bibliography ==
- Milner, Richard (November 4, 2011). "A Wet Red World? The Search for Water on Mars Goes On". Astrobiology Magazine. Space.com. Retrieved August 26, 2023.
- Slotten, Ross A. (2004). The Heretic in Darwin's Court: The Life of Alfred Russel Wallace. Columbia University Press. ISBN 978-0-231-13010-3.
- Smith, Charles H. (2018). Is Mars Habitable? (S730: 1907). The Alfred Russel Wallace Page. Western Kentucky University. Retrieved August 26, 2023.
- Wallace, Alfred R. (1907). Is Mars Habitable? A Critical Examination of Professor Percival Lowell’s Book 'Mars and its Canals,' with an Alternative Explanation. Macmillan.
- Wallace, Alfred R. (January 27, 1908). "Letter to the Editor". The Daily News. no. 19303: 6f.
- "Is Not Convinced of Life on Mars". The New York Times. no. 18116: 3a-b. August 31, 1907.
