= Albert C. Simmonds Jr. =

American banker

President of the Bank of New York
- In office 1948–1957
- Preceded by: John C. Traphagen
- Succeeded by: Donald M. Elliman

Personal details
- Born: Albert Carleton Simmonds Jr. August 15, 1902 Simmesport, Louisiana
- Died: June 21, 1963 (aged 60) Presbyterian Hospital, Manhattan, New York
- Spouse: Mary Adelaide Harding (m. 1931; died 1963)
- Education: Bolton High School
- Alma mater: Vanderbilt University; Harvard University

Albert Carleton Simmonds Jr. (August 15, 1902 – June 21, 1963) was an American banker.

== Early life ==
Simmonds was born on June 21, 1963, at Simmesport in Avoyelles Parish, Louisiana. He was the eldest child of Albert Carleton Simmonds (1871–1930) and Nonie Adela (née Butler) Simmonds (1875–1963). His paternal grandparents were Henry Simmonds and Mary Eliza (née Reily) Simmonds. His maternal grandparents were Confederate soldier Thomas Callaham Butler and, his first wife, Jane (née Robinette) Butler.

After graduating from Bolton High School in Alexandria, Louisiana in 1917, Simmonds attended Vanderbilt University, graduating in 1922. He taught history for a year at the high school in Thomasville, Georgia before attending Harvard University, where he graduated with a Master of Business Administration in 1925.

== Career ==
After Harvard, Simmonds joined the Texas and Pacific Railway Company in New York City. In 1930, he joined the Bank of New York and after subsequent stints as assistant treasurer, assistant vice president and vice president, he was elected to succeed John C. Traphagen as President of the Bank of New York in 1948. In 1957, he became chief executive officer and chairman of the bank, serving until his death in 1963. In 1960 and 1961, he was president of the New York State Bankers Association.

Simmonds also served as a trustee, or director, of the Greenwich Savings Bank, the North American Reassurance Company, the Celotex Corporation, the American Casualty Insurance Company, North American Reinsurance Corporation, the Borden Company, the Valley Forge Life Insurance Company, and the Valley Forge Insurance Company.

== Personal life ==
On February 28, 1931, in Chicago, Illinois, Simmonds married Mary Adelaide Harding (1904–1994), a daughter of lawyer Victor M. Harding of Hubbard Woods, Illinois. They lived together at Indian Trail in Harrison, New York and were the parents of:

- Albert Carleton Simmonds III, who graduated from Yale University in 1959 and served as vice president of the Wyatt Company, an actuarial consulting company in Washington, D.C.; he married Barbara Smith.
- Diane Deblois Simmonds (1934–1934), who died in infancy.

Simmonds died at the Presbyterian Hospital in Manhattan on August 15, 1902, and was buried at Greenwood Union Cemetery in Rye, New York. After his death, his widow married insurance executive Duncan M. Findlay of Huntington, New York, in 1964. (Note: Duncan M. Findlay, was previously married, and divorced, from Eleanora H. Noyes, the daughter of real estate developer Charles F. Noyes who gifted her an interest in the Crown Building in Manhattan, before it was sold by Noyes and Joseph Durst in November 1950.)
