= J. Hampden Robb =

American merchant and politician

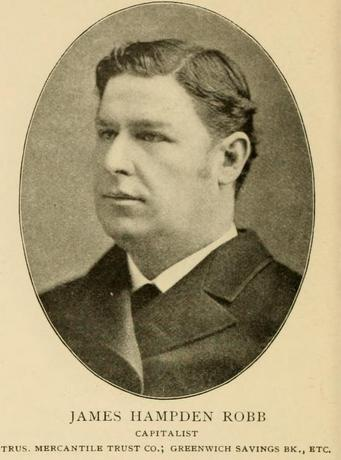

Member of the New York State Senate
- In office January 1, 1884 – December 31, 1885
- Preceded by: Robert Ray Hamilton
- Succeeded by: Walter Howe

Member of the New York State Assembly
- In office January 1, 1882 – December 31, 1882
- Preceded by: Joseph Koch
- Succeeded by: William C. Traphagen

Personal details
- Born: James Hampden Robb; October 27, 1846 Philadelphia, Pennsylvania
- Died: January 22, 1911 (aged 64) New York City, New York
- Party: Democrat
- Spouse: Cornelia Van Rensselaer Thayer (m. 1868; died 1903)
- Relations: Goodhue Livingston (son-in-law)
- Children: 4
- Parent(s): James Robb; Louisa Werninger
- Education: L'Institut Sillig; Churchill's Military School
- Alma mater: Harvard College

James Hampden Robb (October 27, 1846 – January 21, 1911) was an American merchant and politician from New York.

== Life ==
Robb was born in Philadelphia, Pennsylvania, on October 27, 1846. He was the son of James Robb, a New Orleans banker and avid art collector who later lived in Cheviot, Ohio, and Louisa (née Werninger) Robb (1808-1855). His mother was painted in Philadelphia in 1844 by Thomas Sully, and is currently held at The Historic New Orleans Collection. His father built the Burnside Mansion in New Orleans, nicknamed the Robb's Folly, in the Garden District, which later became one of the first buildings of the newly founded Newcomb College until it was demolished in 1954.

His father's prominent business in New Orleans attracted the attention of Queen Isabella II of Spain and, with her, he formed a partnership and purchased the Havana Gas Works in Cuba. While working with the Queen, his father brought one of his three sisters, Isabella, to Spain with him where she was presented at Court. She eventually married Eduardo Fernández, Marquis de San Román, a cousin of Queen Isabella II of Spain, in 1857, thereby becoming the Marchioness de San Roman. Eugénie de Montijo, Empress consort of the French attended the wedding which was held at the Tuileries Palace in Paris. Another sister, Charlotte Matilda Robb (1852–1902), married Dr. William Henry Pancoast (1834–1897), a surgeon in Philadelphia who was the son of Dr. Joseph Pancoast, and the other, Mary Robb (d. 1903), who married Joseph O. Miltenberger, a wealthy merchant from St. Louis, and later, Col. Henry Mapleson (1851–1927), and Englishman who was the son of James Henry Mapleson.

He attended L'Institut Sillig in Vevey, Churchill's Military School in Ossining, and Harvard University, graduating with the Class of 1866.

== Career ==
From 1866 until 1886, and following his graduation from Harvard, he became a banker and cotton broker in New York City.

Robb, a Democrat, was a member of the New York State Assembly (New York County, 11th D.) in the 105th New York State Legislature, serving from January 1 until December 31, 1882. While in the Assembly, he was chairman of the Committee on Banks and worked hard for the anti-usury laws. He was also a member of the New York State Senate (10th D.) in the 107th and 108th New York State Legislatures, serving from January 1, 1884, until December 31, 1885. While a member of the Senate, "he fought for the appropriation which made possible the State reservation of Niagara Falls." He later served as the treasurer of the original Niagara Falls State Park.

As someone interested in the preservation of the beauty of New York, he was appointed a New York City Parks Commissioner in 1887 by Mayor Abram Hewitt, serving from May 1888 to December 1890; and was President of the Board of Park Commissioners from May 1888 to May 1889. At the time, a newspaper wrote of him:

Only by eternal vigilance can the parks be maintained and developed as they ought to be, for there is never a time when some one is not trying to 'work' something to his own personal advantage and toe the detriment of the public. If he can't work it he makes a terrible hullaballoo and abuses the Commissioners. Mr. Robb has withstood all these jobs, big and little, and has endeavored to have the parks administered so that the people of New York can get the greatest possible enjoyment and benefit out of them.

An active member of the Democratic National Convention of 1884 and 1888, he put former New York Governor and the President Grover Cleveland's name forward in 1888, which led to Cleveland recapturing the Democratic nomination in the 1888 presidential election (of which Republican Benjamin Harrison eventually emerged victorious). In 1887, Cleveland offered Robb the position of Assistant Secretary of State, which Robb declined.

=== Later career ===
After retiring from politics in 1888, Robb focused on charitable causes, serving as the president of the Society for Reformation of Juvenile Delinquents which conducts the House of Refuge on Randall's Island. He also served as the secretary of the American Museum of Natural History and was vice president of the Union Club of the City of New York for many years. He was also a founder, and the first president, of the People's Symphony Society.

Beginning in 1895, he was a trustee of the Greenwich Savings Bank and served as one of the secretaries of the board in 1904. Also in 1895, he was a founder of the American Scenic and Historic Preservation Society. In 1900, he became a member of the Pennsylvania Society, serving as its president from 1905 to 1907, and was the first chairman of the committee on the William Penn Memorial.

== Personal life ==
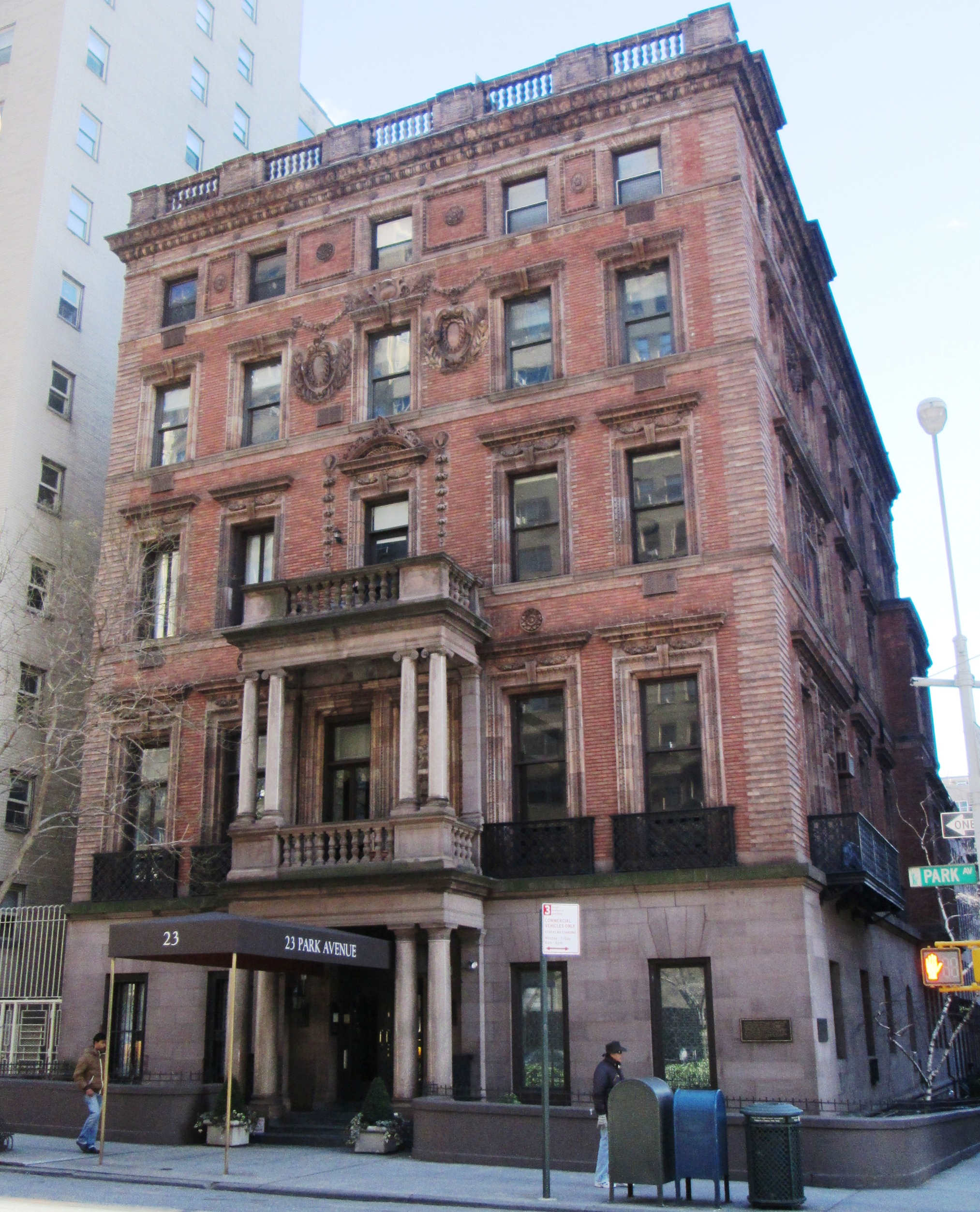
The Robb House, designed by Stanford White

In 1868, Robb was married to Cornelia Van Rensselaer Thayer (1849–1903). She was the daughter of Nathaniel Thayer, Jr. (1808–1883), a banker who built Harvard's Thayer Hall, and Cornelia Paterson (née Van Rensselaer) Thayer (1823–1897). She was the older sister of John Eliot Thayer (1862–1933), an amateur ornithologist, a granddaughter of Stephen Van Rensselaer IV and a great-granddaughter of New York Lt. Gov. Stephen Van Rensselaer III. Together, they were the parents of four children:

- Nathaniel Thayer Robb (b. 1870), who married Frances Beatrix Henderson (1875–1957), daughter of Charles R. Henderson and Jennie North, in 1895.
- Cornelia Van Rensselaer Robb (b. 1874)
- Louisa Robb (1877–1960), who married Goodhue Livingston (1867–1951), a prominent architect, in 1896.
- Harriet Bayard Robb (1881–1910), who died, unmarried, aged 29 at her father's home.

In 1892, he moved into a house built for him by Stanford White, at 23 Park Avenue. Afterwards, from 1924 to 1977, the house was the location of the Advertising Club. Robb also had a house at North East Harbor in Maine.

Robb died at his residence, 23 Park Avenue in New York City, from a complication of diseases.

=== Descendants ===
Through his son Nathaniel, he was the grandfather of Janet Henderson Robb (b. 1896); James Hampden Robb (b. 1898); and Cornelia Van Rensselaer Robb (b. 1904), who married Dr. Walther F. Goebel.

Through his daughter Louisa, he was the grandfather of Goodhue Livingston, Jr. (1897–1994), who married Joan Livingston Allen (1898–1964), the daughter of Frederick Hobbes Allen in 1919. They divorced in 1931 and in 1932 he married Lorna Mackay (1911–1986). They divorced in the 1950s and he married Ruth Monsch Gordon. They also divorced and, in 1966, he married Dorothy Michelson-Stevens-Bitter-Dick (d. 1994), the widow of William Dixon Stevens and the daughter of Albert A. Michelson. He was also the grandfather of Cornelia Thayer Livingston (1903–1975), who married Frederic Cromwell Jr. (1900–1973) in 1927.

New York State Assembly
Preceded by Robert Ray Hamilton	New York State Assembly; New York County, 11th District; 1882	Succeeded by Walter Howe
New York State Senate
Preceded by Joseph Koch	New York State Senate; 9th District; 1884–1885	Succeeded by William C. Traphagen
