= List of Baltimore and Ohio Railroad civil engineers 1827 to 1857 =

This is a partial list of the civil engineers who were either directly or indirectly associated with the Baltimore and Ohio Railroad during its initial construction from Baltimore, Maryland in 1828 to Sandy Hook, Maryland, in 1834; Cumberland in 1842; the Ohio River at Moundsville, Virginia, in 1852; Wheeling, Virginia, in 1853; and Parkersburg, Virginia in 1857, ending in the "Great Railway Celebrations of 1857."

== List ==
=== Early promoters ===
- Ward, Minus. Ward, an early civil engineering promoter from Columbia, South Carolina, had several inventions for steam engines. Ward claimed he invented placing iron rails on stone lintels in 1825. However, Joseph von Baader is credited for this invention. Ward published an analysis of how the new steam engine technology could be implemented on the railroad.

=== Board of Engineers (1828–1829) ===
This railroad organized the Board with Phillip Thomas, president of the new railroad, and composed of the following engineers and participants:

- Brown, George (1787–1859) provided economic analysis of various construction methods
- Knight, Jonathan (1787–1858), civil engineer

Knight was a civil engineer who worked on the National Road, Chesapeake and Ohio Canal and as a member of the U.S. House of Representatives for Pennsylvania's 20th congressional district from 1855 to 1857.

- Long, Stephen Harriman (1784–1864), Col., United States Army Corps of Topographical Engineers.

Long was a member of the railroad's special commission that traveled to England in 1828 to study British railroads. Long was also in charge of the line's location between Parr's Ridge at the head of the Patapsco River and what was then Wheeling, Virginia.

- McNeill, William Gibbs (1801–1853), Captain, United States Army Corps of Topographical Engineers.

McNeil was a member of the railroad's special commission that traveled to England in 1828 to study British railroads. McNeil was also in charge of the line's location between Baltimore and Ellicott's Mills and up to the valley of the Patapsco to Parr's Range.

- Whistler, George Washington (1800–1849), Lieut. United States Army Corps of Topographical Engineers.

Whistler was the engineer in charge of building the first railroad station in the nation at Ellicott's Mills, Maryland.

==== Topographical engineers ====
These individuals were responsible for managing surveys and field operations.

- Cook, William Perrine (1801–1865) Lieut. United States Army Corps of Topographical Engineers. Under the direction of Captain McNeil, Cook was one of the topographical engineers working on locating the line thru the Patapsco River valley from 1828 thru 1829.
- Dillahunty, John Neal (1800–1844) Lieut., United States Army Corps of Topographical Engineers. Under the direction of Captain McNeil, Dillahunty was one of the topographical engineers working on locating the line thru the Patapsco River valley from 1828 thru 1829.
- Hazzard, Richard Edward (1804–1831) Lieut., United States Army Corps of Topographical Engineers. Under the direction of Captain McNeil, Hazzard was one of the topographical engineers working on locating the line thru the Patapsco River valley from 1828 thru 1829.

Other engineers working on locating the line were:

- Barney, Charles R., Barney produced most right-of-way drawings for the main stem from Baltimore to the Monocacy River.
- Barney, Joshua (1800–1867) Lieut., United States Army Corps of Topographical Engineers.
- Fessenden, John M. (1804–1883) Lieut., United States Army Corps of Topographical Engineers.
- Guion, Walter Burling (1808–1846). Guion attended West Point as part of the Class of 1828 but did not graduate. Guion was expelled for his role in the "egg nog" riot in 1826.
- Gwynn, Walter (1802–1882) Lieut., United States Army Corps of Topographical Engineers. Gwynn was a railroad engineer and railroad president before the Civil War, Florida Comptroller in 1863, and a civil engineer after the Civil War.
- Harrison, Fredrick Jr. (1802–1889) Harrison attended West Point as part of the Class of 1823 but did not graduate.
- Howard, William (1793–1834) was an American topographical engineer who was one of the first to work for the railroad.

Long and McNeil led two teams of engineers to locate the road, while Howard led the third.

- Thompson, William Beverhout (1805–1867) Lieut., United States Army Corps of Topographical Engineers.
- Trimble, Issac Ridgeway (1802–1888) Lieut., United States Army Corps of Topographical Engineers. Trimble was a United States Army officer, a civil engineer, a prominent railroad construction superintendent and executive, and a Confederate general in the American Civil War.
- Wernwag, Louis (1769–1843) Wernwag was a bridge builder in the United States in the early 19th century. The 1828 engineering board recommendations included Wernwag's practices for wooden bridge construction. Wernwag also constructed bridges on the Potomac and Monocacy rivers.

Consulting engineers

- Hartley, Jesse (1780–1860) was a prominent British civil engineer best known as the Engineer and Superintendent of Liverpool’s dock estate from 1824 until 1860. Hartley consulted with the railroad's Board of Directors on the construction of the railroad.
- Knight, Isaac (1785–1855). In 1828, Knight consulted with the railroad on developing a machine to move earth. In 1835, he applied for the job of Chief Engineer of the Long Island railroad, which went to another B&O alumnus, William Gibbs McNeil.

=== Chief Engineer Knight (1829–1842) ===
Jonathan Knight was the first chief engineer for the railroad. He was assisted by the following individuals:

- Fairfax, Wilson M. C. Fairfax was originally hired by the Chesapeake and Ohio Canal but eventually resigned to assist Chief Engineer Knight in making surveys and necessary levelling between Point of Rocks and Harpers Ferry.
- Petit, J. M., Petit ran the leveling effort for Baltimore to Ellicott Mills segment.
- Pollack, William, Pollack was the superintendent of rail construction between Baltimore and Ellicott Mills.
- Randolph, James Lingan (1817–1888) Randolph worked on the construction of the railroad from Harper's Ferry to Cumberland, Maryland. He later worked on the Cumberland to Wheeling extension, first as a resident engineer in 1839 and later as a division engineer, directing work along Tygart's Valley and the Monongahela Rivers. With the disbanding of the entire Engineer's Corps, Randolph left the road.
- Ranney, Henry Joseph (1807–1865). Ranney worked on the final location (center line and curvature details) of the line over Parr's Ridge, which required a system of inclined planes to cross. Ranney then finished the line location to Ballinger Creek, near Frederick, Maryland.

Ranney was a prominent railroad construction executive, president of the New Orleans, Jackson, and Great Northern railway (1861 – 1865), and a Confederate officer from Kentucky in the American Civil War.

- Smith, Ralph S. Smith assisted Chief Engineer Knight in making surveys and necessary levelling between Point of Rocks and Harpers Ferry.
- Stabler, James P., was the engineer in charge of building the horse tramway from Baltimore to Ellicott's Mills, which was finished in May of 1829. Stabler did this while Wever was active with the Chancellor of Maryland on resolving the Chesapeake and Ohio canal controversy on the Potomac River.
- Steele, J. D., Steele was responsible for the final location (center line and curvature details) of the line between Ellicott's Mills and the forks of the Patapsco.

Assisted by

- Alderson, Benjamin A.
- Dunbar, George T.
- Shriver, Joseph
- Smith, John W.

=== Chief Engineer Latrobe (1842–1864) ===
Benjamin Henry Latrobe II (1806–1878), Assistant Engineer 1830-1842, Chief Engineer 1842-1854, compiled a 150-page report that examined in a detailed manner the options for the B&O to expand to the Ohio River. He supervised these civil engineers and architects.

- Charles Key Bruce (1816–1875), Resident engineer for the road construction between Harper's Ferry and Cumberland, Maryland, from 1839 to 1847.
- Neilson,James Crawford, (1816–1900)
- Fink, Albert, (1827–1897)
- Niernsee, John Rudolph, (1814–1885).

==== Board of Engineers (1850) ====
In 1850, the railroad and the city of Wheeling, Virginia (now in West Virginia), were at odds over the route into the city. Virginia passed legislation requiring a board of three engineers to determine the most favorable and practical route to Wheeling.

- Mahan, Dennis Hart (1802–1871). Mahan, a civil engineer and professor at the United States Military Academy at West Point from 1824 to 1871, was one of the Board's engineers.
- McRae, John (1809–1891) of Charleston, South Carolina. McRae was one of the Board's engineers.
- Clark, Meriwether Lewis (1809–1881) was an architect, civil engineer, and politician. He was also a military officer in the Mexican–American War and the American Civil War. Clark was one of the Board's engineers.
- Alexander, John Henry (1812–1867) was a civil engineer and Western Maryland coal entrepreneur who produced a report on a recommended route into Wheeling for the Board of Engineers to consider.
- Ellet, Charles Jr. (1810–1862) was an American civil engineer who designed and supervised the construction of the Wheeling Suspension Bridge, the longest suspension bridge in the world, from 1849 to 1851 who also produced a report on a recommended route into Wheeling for the Board of Engineers to consider.

== See also ==
- List of people associated with rail transport
- List of civil engineers
- List of U.S. military railroad civil engineers in the American Civil War
