= James Robb (banker) =

American banker

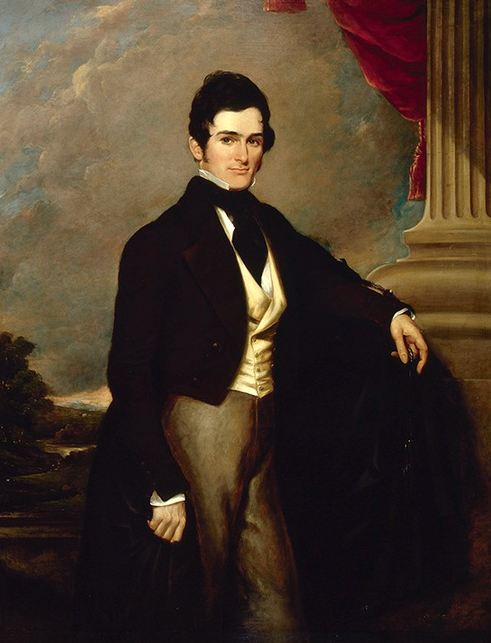
- James Robb by George Healy

Member of the Louisiana Senate from the Orleans Parish district

Personal details
- Born: April 2, 1814 Brownville, Fayette County, Pennsylvania
- Died: July 30, 1881 (aged 67) Cincinnati, Ohio
- Party: Whig
- Spouse: Louisa Werninger
- Occupation: Banker, Financier
- Known for: James Robb Bank, NOPSI, New Orleans, Jackson, and Great Northern Railroad

James Robb was born in Brownsville, Fayette County, Pennsylvania on April 4, 1814, to Samuel Robb and Mary Meetkerke, daughter of William Meetkerke and Nancy Irwin. His father drowned when James was only five. He left home in January 1827, at the age of 13, and traveled by foot to Wheeling then part of Virginia, where he was hired as a messenger boy at a local bank, and was then promoted to cashier. He married Louisa Werninger in 1835 and began looking for commercial prospects in other American cities, and moved to New Orleans in 1837 where he opened a brokerage office and resided on St. Charles Avenue. He resurrected the failing New Orleans Gas Light and Banking Company, organized with Maria Christina Queen of Spain, The Spanish Gas Light Company in Havanna, Cuba, and was the driving force behind New Orleans, Jackson, and Great Northern. He became of member of the Louisiana State Senate.

He built the Robb Mansion, which became known as Robb's Folly, now Burnside Mansion, in the Garden District. He was an early member of The Boston Club, and close friends with Thomas Slidell and Judah Benjamin.

He was the father of James Hampden Robb.
