= Frederick Lincoln Stoddard =

American artist (1861–1940)

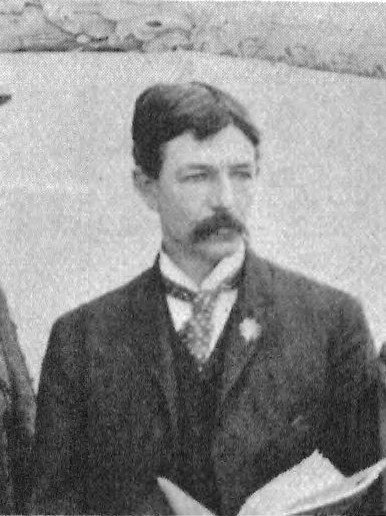
- Stoddard, c. 1904
- Born: 7 March 1861; Coaticook, Quebec, Canada
- Died: 24 February 1940 (aged 78); Gloucester, Massachusetts, U.S.
- Known for: Painting

Frederick Lincoln Stoddard (March 7, 1861 - February 24, 1940) was an artist known for his stained glass, paintings and murals, with notable pieces designed as public works in Missouri, New York, and Massachusetts. He also produced magazine covers in the late 19th and early 20th century. Stoddard's style and work shows the influence of French painter Pierre Puvis de Chavannes (1824–1898).

== Biography ==
Born in Coaticook, Quebec, Canada, he attended college at North Missouri State Normal School in Kirksville, Missouri, and later St. Louis School of Fine Arts, where he studied art. He started out working with stained glass but switched to murals after spending five years in Paris. In France, he studied under or was influenced by William-Adolphe Bouguereau, Gabriel Ferrier, Jean-Paul Laurens, and Jean-Joseph Benjamin-Constant. Stoddard was active at the Paris Salon and exhibited his work. He returned to the US in the 1890s and became an art instructor at the St. Louis School of Fine Arts, where he taught design, applied art, and watercolor painting from 1894 to 1905.

In 1896, he was commissioned to paint murals for St. Louis City Hall and local high schools. He was awarded a silver medal for his work at the Louisiana Purchase Exposition in 1904, and was active as the chairman of art education for the exposition. A mural that he submitted for a tympanum, titled "The School of Sappho", was placed over the entrance of the Liberal Arts Building at the fair. He moved to New York in 1906 and was an active mural painter for various schools, such as the Hebrew Technical School for Girls and the Eastern District High School. He was also a member of the Salmagundi Club. In 1922, he moved to Gloucester, Massachusetts, where he would spend the last 17 years of his life. In Gloucester, he lived with his wife Henrietta Ravet, where he was president of the Gloucester Society of Artists and secretary of the North Shore Artists' Association. The Sawyer Free Library features his art work. He died in Gloucester in 1940.

== Selected works ==
- Praise Angel (1890) Monticello Seminary, Godfrey, IL
- Cherub 1 with inscription "And with the morn those angel faces smile" (1902), Richardson family tomb, Bellefontaine Cemetery, St. Louis, MO
- Cherub 2 with inscription "Which we have loved long since and lost awhile" (1902), Richardson family tomb, Bellefontaine Cemetery, St. Louis, MO
- Founding of St. Louis (1902), Murals in Mayor's Office, City Hall St. Louis, MO
- School of Sappho (1902)
- Womanhood (1908), Hebrew Technical School for Girls, New York City.
- The Birth and Development of Education (1915-1916), oil on canvas. Eastern District High School, Brooklyn
- Education as the Actuating Force in Patriotism (1922), oil on canvas. Eastern District High School, Brooklyn

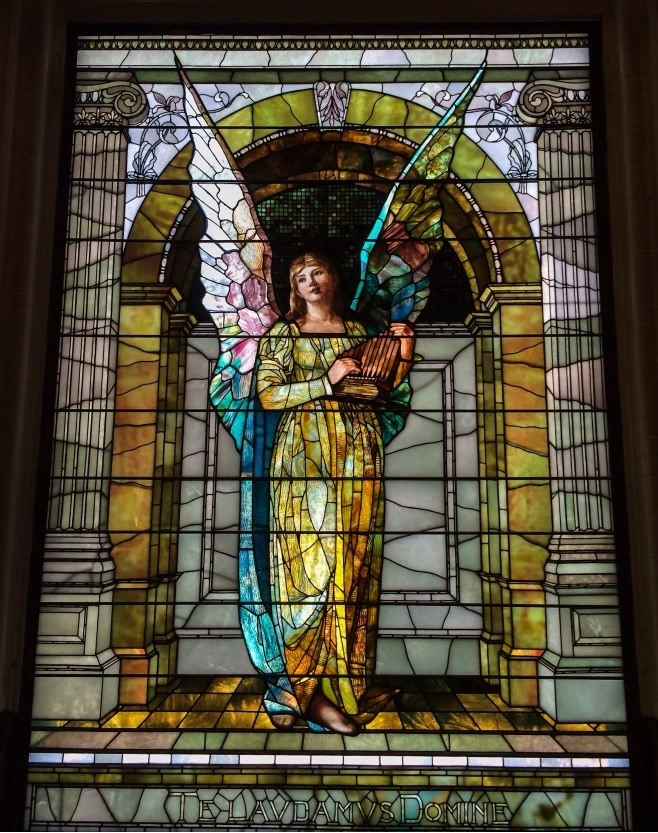
Praise Angel (1890), window at Monticello Seminary

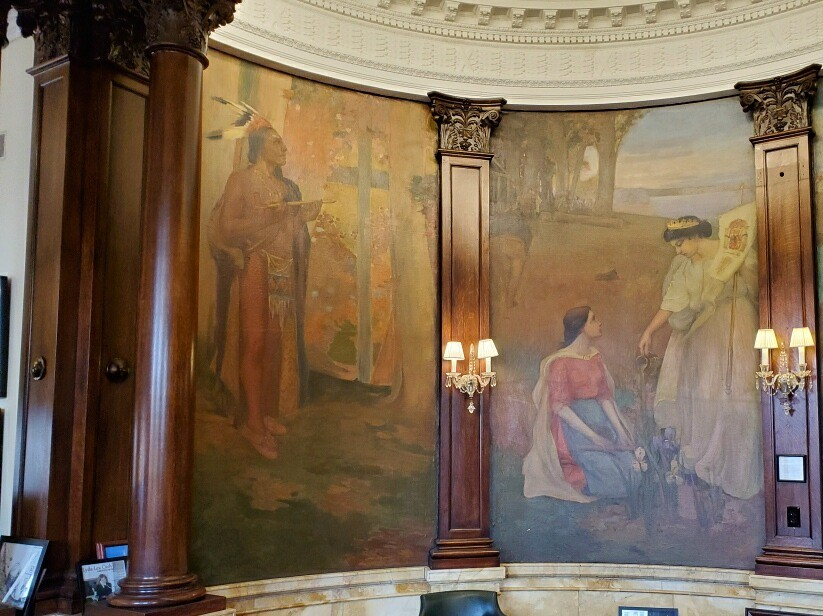
Founding of St. Louis (1902), Mayor's Office of City Hall, St. Louis, MO

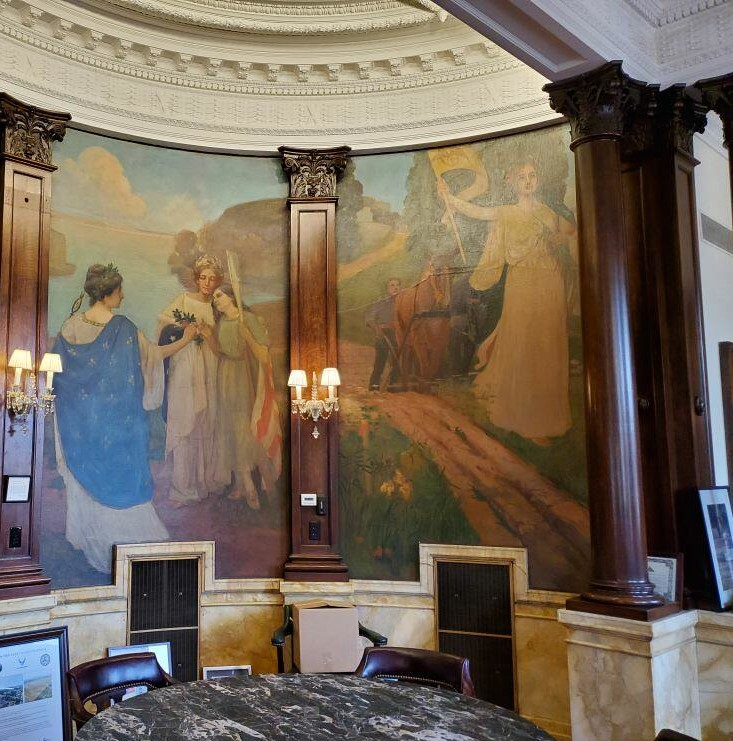
Founding of St. Louis (1902), Mayor's Office of City Hall, St. Louis, MO

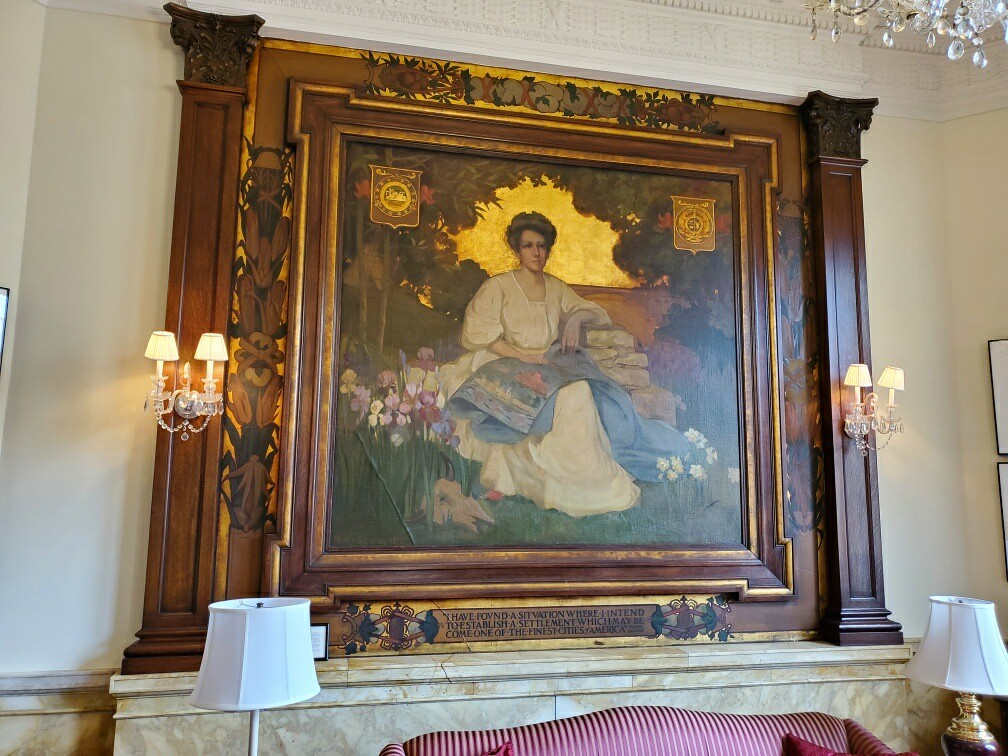
Portrait of Barbara Blackman O'Neil (1902), Mayor's Office of City Hall, St. Louis, MO

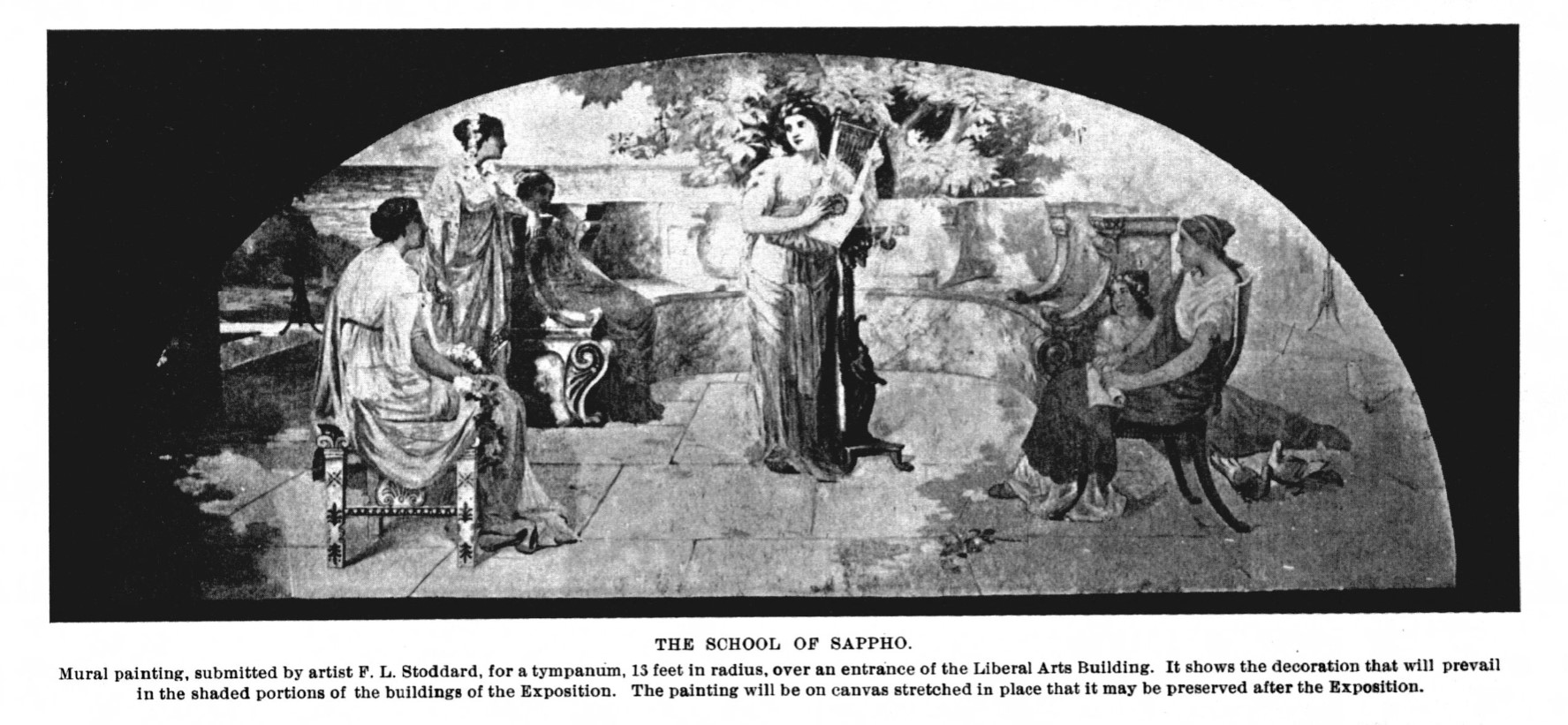
School of Sappho oil painting for the 1904 World's Fair

== See also ==
- "The Things that Live on Mars"
- Frank Reaugh

== Bibliography ==
- Bulletin of the Municipal Art Society. No. 4. Oct. 1915.
- World's Fair Bulletin Volume 3, number 11 (1902)
- Cohen, Michele (2002). Art to Educate: A History of Public Art in the New York City Public Schools, 1890-1976. (PhD thesis). City University of New York.
- "Decoration of City High Schools". International Studio 56 (XLIII). August 1915.
- Obituary. (March 1940). Current Biography. Biography Reference Bank. H. W. Wilson Company. Retrieved August 22, 2023.
- Power, Dawn (2022). "Frederick Lincoln Stoddard". Personal website. Collection of primary, archival source documents about the artist.
