= William Colston Leigh Sr. =

- Born: August 7, 1901; New York City
- Died: July 19, 1992 (aged 90); Tampa, Florida
- Known for: establishing the Leigh Bureau, a major speakers' agency
- Spouse(s): Helen M. Cady div. Ardis Neff 20 August 1946–July 19, 1992
- Children: William Colston Leigh Jr.
- Parent(s): Anna (née Seng) and William Robinson Leigh
- Relatives: distant cousins, also descended from Ferdinando Leigh: Claiborne Pell; Lindy Boggs

William Colston Leigh Sr. (August 7, 1901 – July 19, 1992) was an American founder of one of the world's leading speakers' agencies, the W. Colston Leigh Bureau.

== Biography ==
He was the son of painter William R. Leigh, born at New York City, and was raised in Portsmouth, Virginia. Prior to establishing the W. Colston Leigh Bureau in 1929, he tried his hand at a number of different roles, including scrap sorter, night watchman and tango teacher. Prior to coming to New York City, he was offered a college baseball scholarship in Georgia – an offer he turned down in order to make an unsuccessful attempt to break into opera as a singer.

After trying a number of occupations, he started the W. Colston Leigh Bureau in 1929, which still operates in Somerville, New Jersey. Among its notable clients were Kurt Adler, Eleanor Roosevelt, Edward R. Murrow, Clement Attlee, William L. Shirer, Jim Thorpe, Art Buchwald, Will Durant, Indira Gandhi, and James A. Michener.

After an unsuccessful marriage to Helen M. Cady, he married Ardis Neff on August 20, 1946. He has a son, William Colston Leigh Jr. He died in 1992 in Tampa, Florida.
